= Cerro de las Mitras =

Mountain in Nuevo León, Mexico

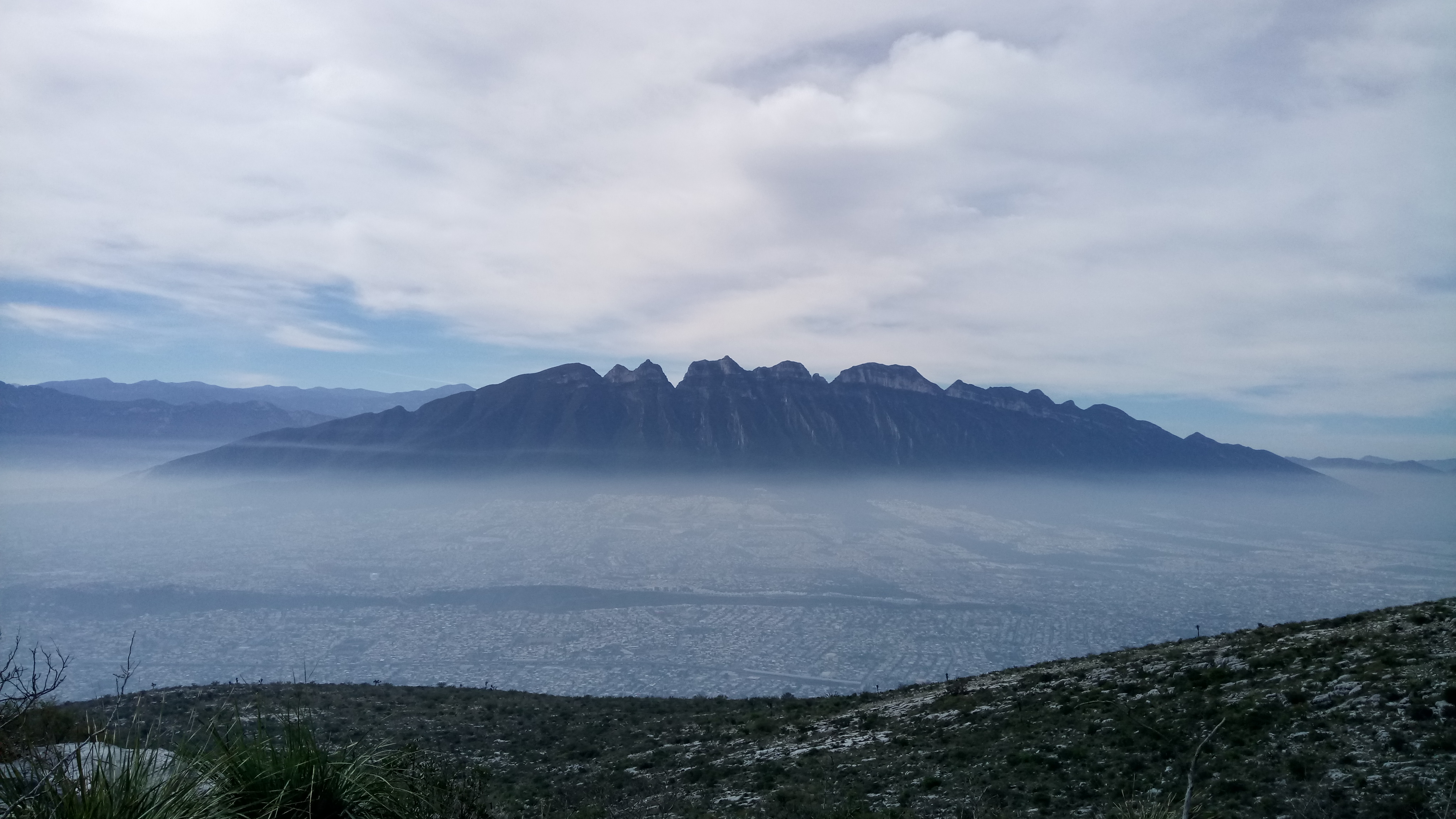
- Cerro de las Mitras from Cerro del Topo Chico

Highest point
- Elevation: 2,060 m

Naming
- English translation: Mitres' Mount
- Language of name: Spanish

Geography
- Location: Nuevo León, Mexico

The Cerro de las Mitras (Spanish for “Miters' Hill”), is a mountain and a protected area in the Monterrey, San Pedro Garza García, Santa Catarina and García municipalities; state of Nuevo León, Mexico. The mountain is part of the Sierra Madre Oriental, the summit reaches 2,060 MASL, and has 1,400 meters of prominence, the topographic isolation is about 14.48 km. The ridge is about 21 km long stretching east to west. The name comes from the resemblance of the peaks in the ridge with a bishop's mitre.

The Cerro de las Mitras is a popular hiking destination despite its difficulty. Several quarries dedicated to the extraction of limestone to produce concrete operate in the mountain despite its protected area designation.

== Gallery ==
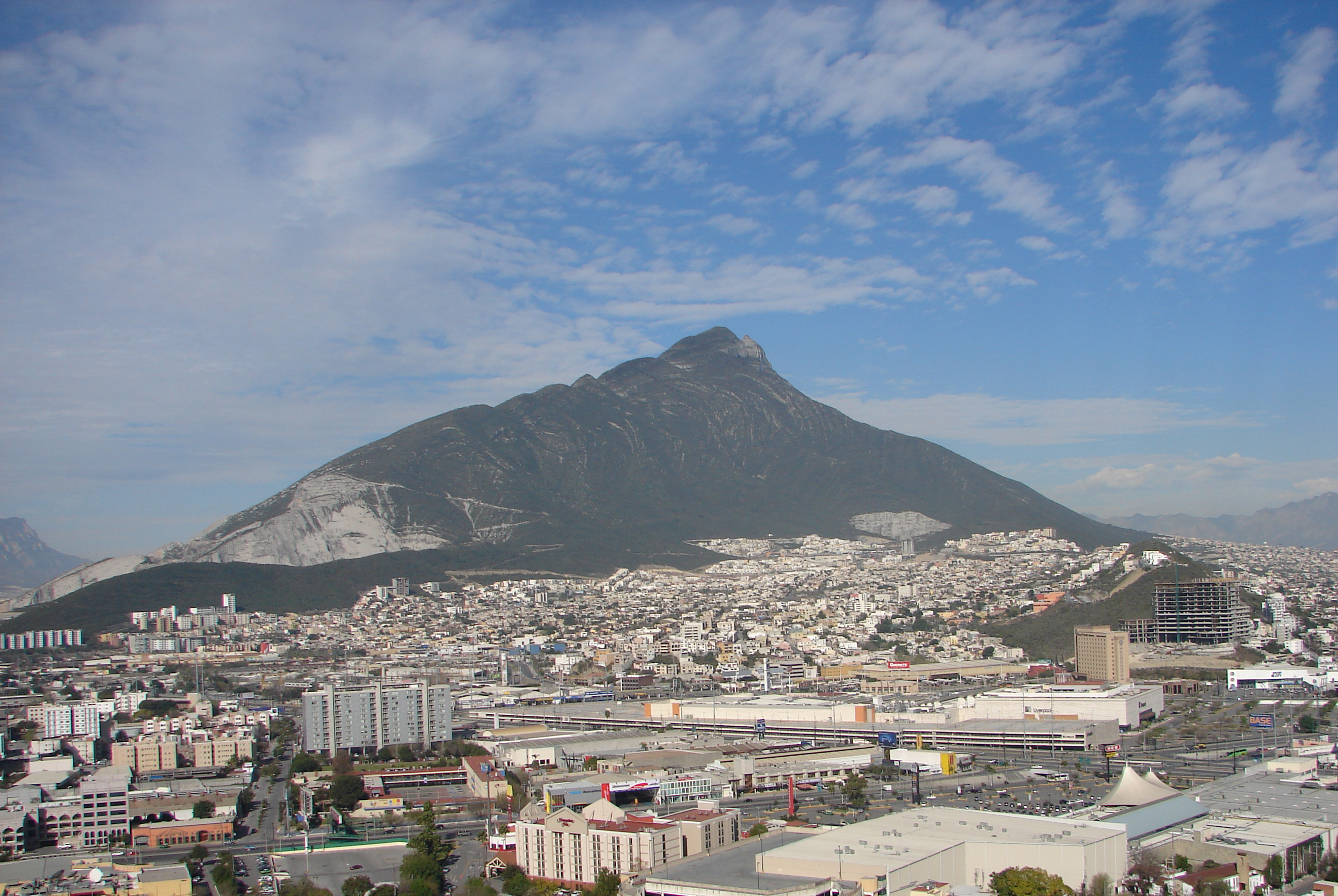
El Cerro de las Mitras from Cerro del Obispado

== See also ==
- Cerro de la Silla
- Cerro de Chipinque
- Cerro del Topo Chico
- Cerro del Obispado
- Cerro de la Loma Larga
- La Huasteca
