= Cerro del Topo Chico =

Mountain in Nuevo León, Mexico

Coordinates: 25°46′24″N 100°20′59″W

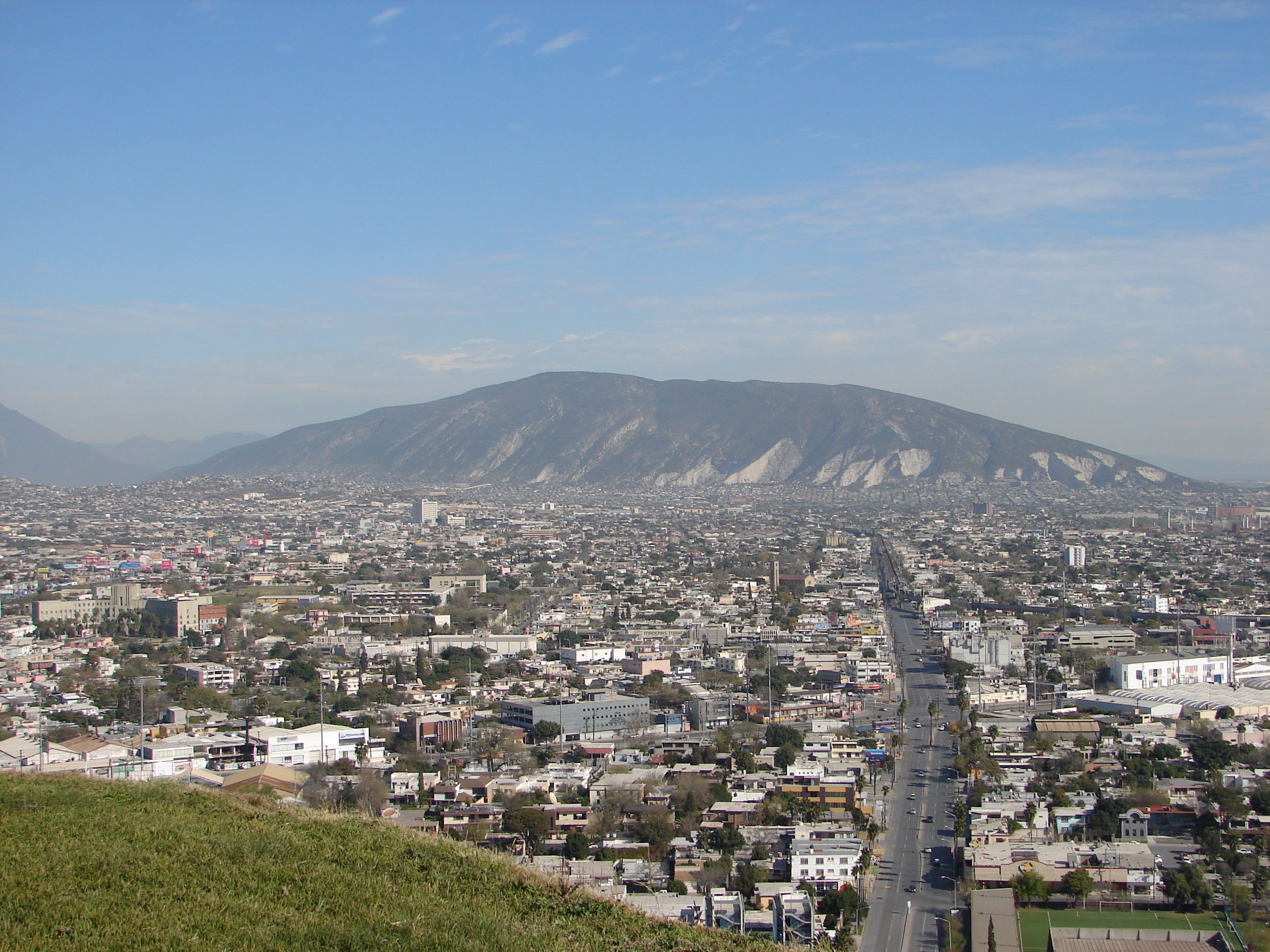
- Cerro del Topo Chico seen from south

Highest point
- Elevation: 1,178 m (3,865 ft)
- Prominence: 618 m (2,028 ft)

Naming
- English translation: Little molehill
- Language of name: Spanish

Geography
- Location within Mexico
- Location: Escobedo, San Nicolás, Monterrey; Nuevo León
- Country: Mexico
- Parent range: Sierra Madre Oriental

Geology
- Mountain type: Mountain

The Cerro del Topo Chico (Spanish, 'Small Mole Hill', from the Latin talpa 'mole') is a mountain and a protected area in the Escobedo, San Nicolás and Monterrey municipalities; state of Nuevo León, Mexico. The summit reaches 1,178 meters above sea level, and it has 618 meters of prominence (Parent: Cerro de las Mitras). The mountain is about 7.5 km long, is a symbol of Escobedo and San Nicolás, and is completely surrounded by Monterrey metropolitan area. It is known for being the source of the Topo Chico mineral water.

== See also ==
- Cerro de la Silla
- Cerro de Chipinque
- Cerro del Obispado
- Cerro de la Loma Larga
- La Huasteca
