= El Salto =

El Salto may refer to:

- El Salto, Durango, a town in Mexico
  - Roman Catholic Territorial Prelature of El Salto
- El Salto, Jalisco, a town and municipality in Mexico
- El Salto (climbing area), in the state of Nuevo León, Mexico
- El Salto Formation, Nicaragua, a geologic formation
- El Salto (newspaper), a Spanish alternative newspaper
- El Salto Airport, in the Maule Region of Chile
- El Salto Dam, El Carpio, Córdoba, Spain

== See also ==
- El Salto del Hanabanilla, a village in Villa Clara Province, Cuba
- Salto (disambiguation)
