= Cerro de la Loma Larga =

Hill in Nuevo Leon, Mexico

Coordinates: 25°39′20″N 100°20′0″W

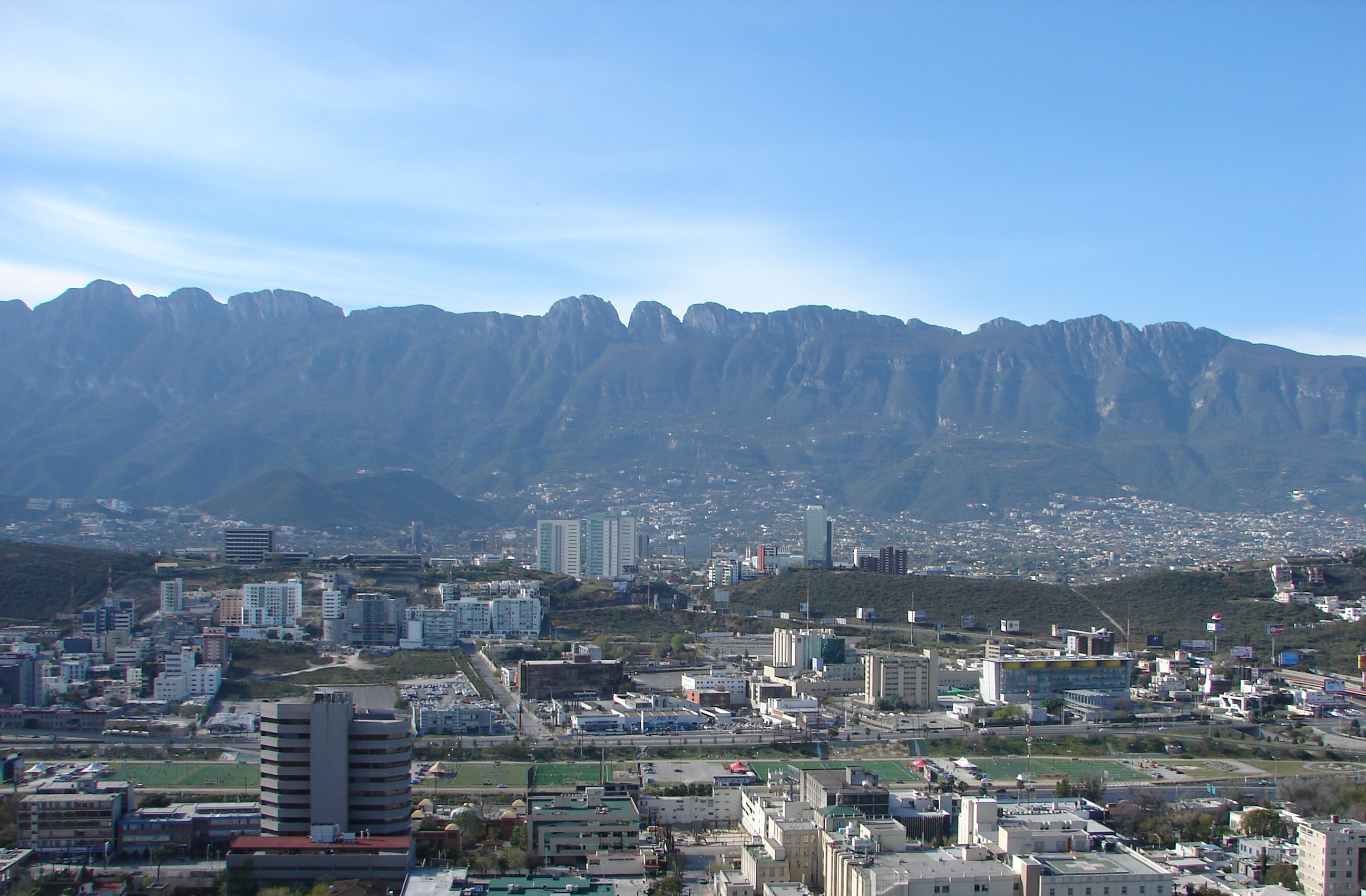
- Cerro de la Loma Larga in the foreground

Naming
- English translation: Long Hill Mountain
- Language of name: Spanish

Geography
- Location: Nuevo León, Mexico

Climbing
- Easiest route: Hike

Cerro de la Loma Larga (literal English: Long Hill Mountain), or Loma Larga (short version), is a lower extension of the Sierra Madre Oriental, particularly of Cerro de las Mitras. located in the Monterrey, Nuevo León metropolitan area.

The hill has long been considered the natural division of the now adjacent cities of Monterrey and San Pedro Garza García. The Diana Cazadora statue marking the division of Monterrey and San Pedro Garza García was placed along a busy avenue (Gonzalitos) crossing over the hill. In the early 2000s, the state government completed the Loma Larga Tunnel, which burrows under the mountain to connect Monterrey to San Pedro Garza García.

For its length of about 10 kilometres (6.2 mi), it is flanked on its northern side by the Santa Catarina River, and on its southern side, the Sierra Madre Oriental in almost full height.

Nearby geological features make it a relatively unremarkable slope. Residential and commercial development has been built over most of the mountain. The Basílica de Guadalupe is also located on the hill, among other churches.

Loma Larga is used for some broadcasting. XHRL-FM and XET-AM, among other stations, maintain facilities on the mountain. Other stations use Cerro del Mirador, located to the west.

Some other well-known mountains or elevations of the area are Cerro de la Silla, Cerro de las Mitras, the Sierra Madre Oriental and Cerro de Chipinque with its famous M-shaped figure, the Cerro del Topo Chico, Cerro del Obispado and La Huasteca.
