= Cerro de la Silla =

Mountain in Nuevo Leon, Mexico

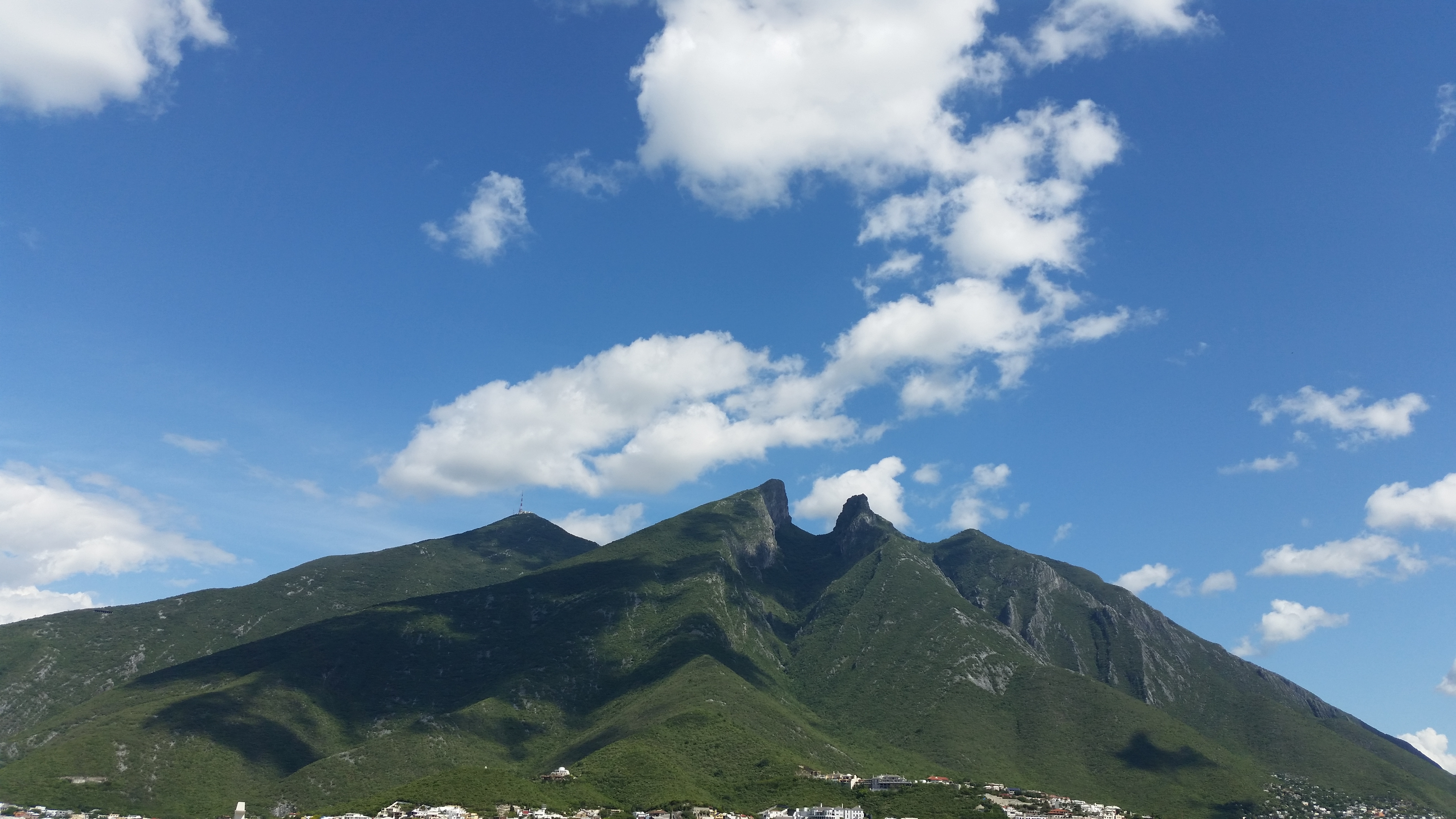
- View of Cerro de la Silla in 2015

Highest point
- Elevation: 1,820 m (5,970 ft)
- Prominence: 1,200 m (3,935 ft)
- Coordinates: 25°37′23″N 100°14′34″W

Naming
- English translation: Saddle Hill
- Language of name: Spanish
- Pronunciation: Spanish pronunciation: [ˈsero ˌðelaˈsiʝa]

Geography
- Location within Nuevo León Location within Mexico
- Location: Juárez, Guadalupe and Monterrey, Nuevo León, Mexico

Climbing
- Easiest route: Hiking

The Cerro de la Silla ("Saddle Hill") is a mountain and natural monument, part of the foothills system of the Sierra Madre Oriental. It is found covering territorial parts of the municipalities of Guadalupe (31.62%), Monterrey (13.23%) and Juárez (55.15%), in the state of Nuevo León. The mountain constitutes an icon of the city of Monterrey and one of the main representative symbols of Nuevo León.

It covers an area of 60.5 square kilometres (23 mi^{2}). The mountain has four peaks: Pico Antena, Pico Norte, Pico Sur and Pico la Virgen; Pico Norte (North Peak) is the highest at 1,820 m (5,970 ft) while Pico la Virgen (Virgin's Peak) is the lowest at 1,750 m (5,740 ft).

Set aside as a natural monument by the Mexican government in 1991, the mountain, or cerro (hill), as mountains are often referred to in Mexico, is a popular recreational area and is often climbed by hikers who take a 5.3 km (3.3 mi) trail to reach the top. The ascent is considered to be fairly difficult, taking approximately 3 hours to complete. A panoramic view of the city of Monterrey can be seen from the top.

In the second half of the 20th century, an aerial tramway (Teleférico en Monterrey) was built on the north side of the mountain to give a fastest access to the iconic mountain for the population. The day of its inauguration on June 2, 1961, was also the day of its closure, as an accident killed five people, including the engineer Jesús Fernández, its designer. Only the upper station remains of the tramway. Several plans have been announced to rebuild another tramway with no results.

Some other known mountains or elevations of the zone are: Cerro de las Mitras, the Sierra Madre Oriental with the Cerro de Chipinque —the M-shaped figure visible from various parts of the city—, the Cerro del Topo Chico, Cerro del Obispado, Cerro de la Loma Larga and La Huasteca.

== Gallery ==
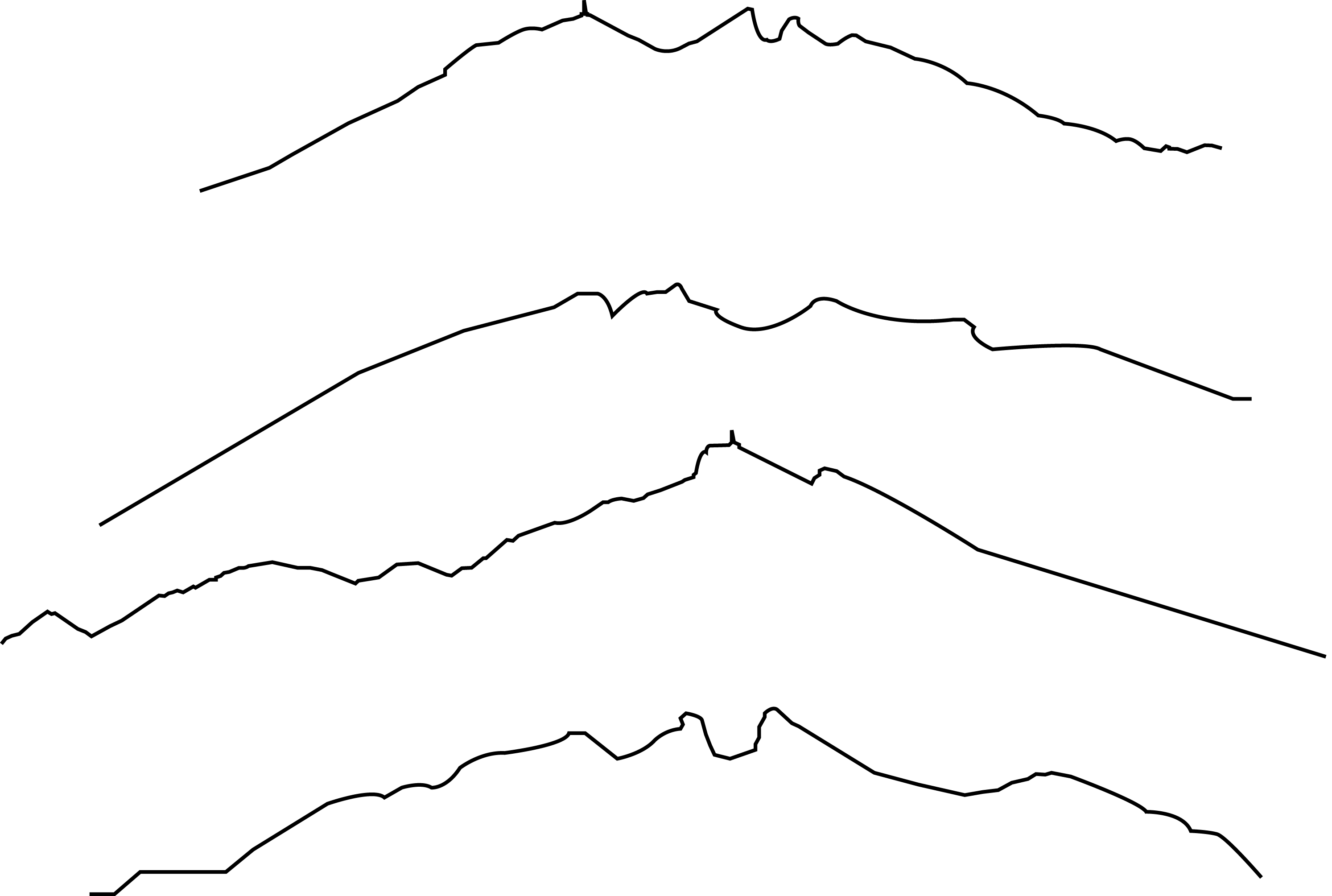
Characteristic depiction of the Cerro de la Silla

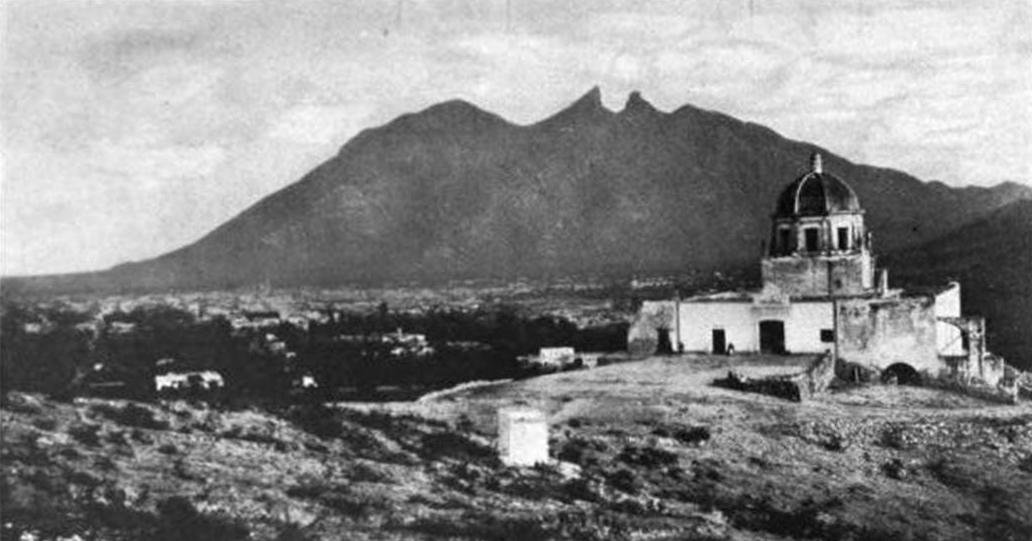
Palacio del Obispado and Cerro de la Silla in 1904

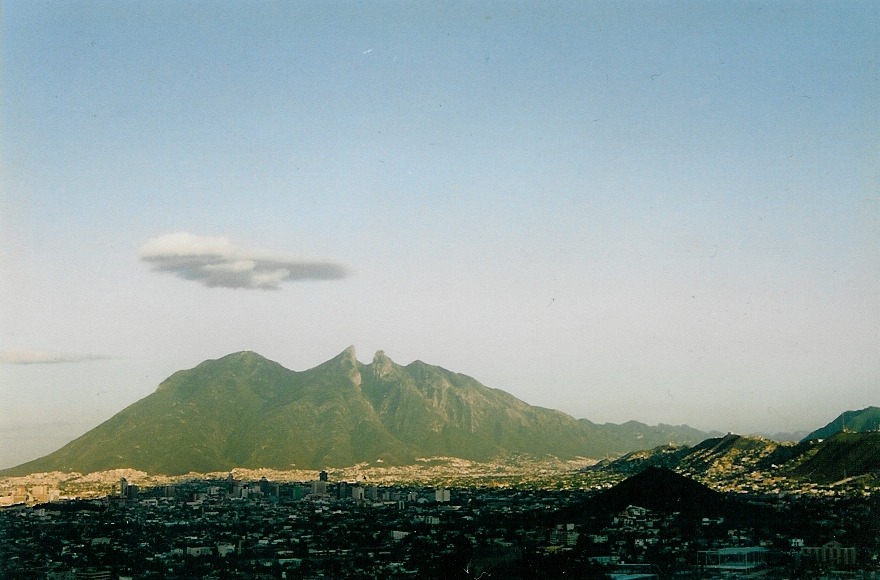
Cerro de la Silla as seen from Cerro del Obispado in 2007

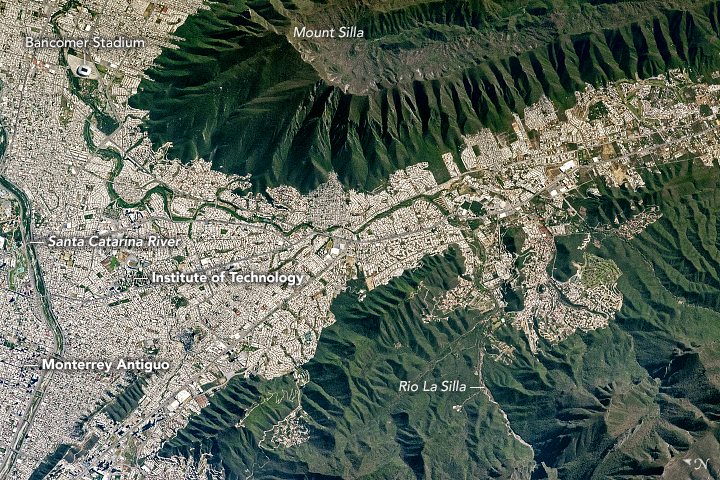
Cerro de la Silla and Monterrey from space in 2017

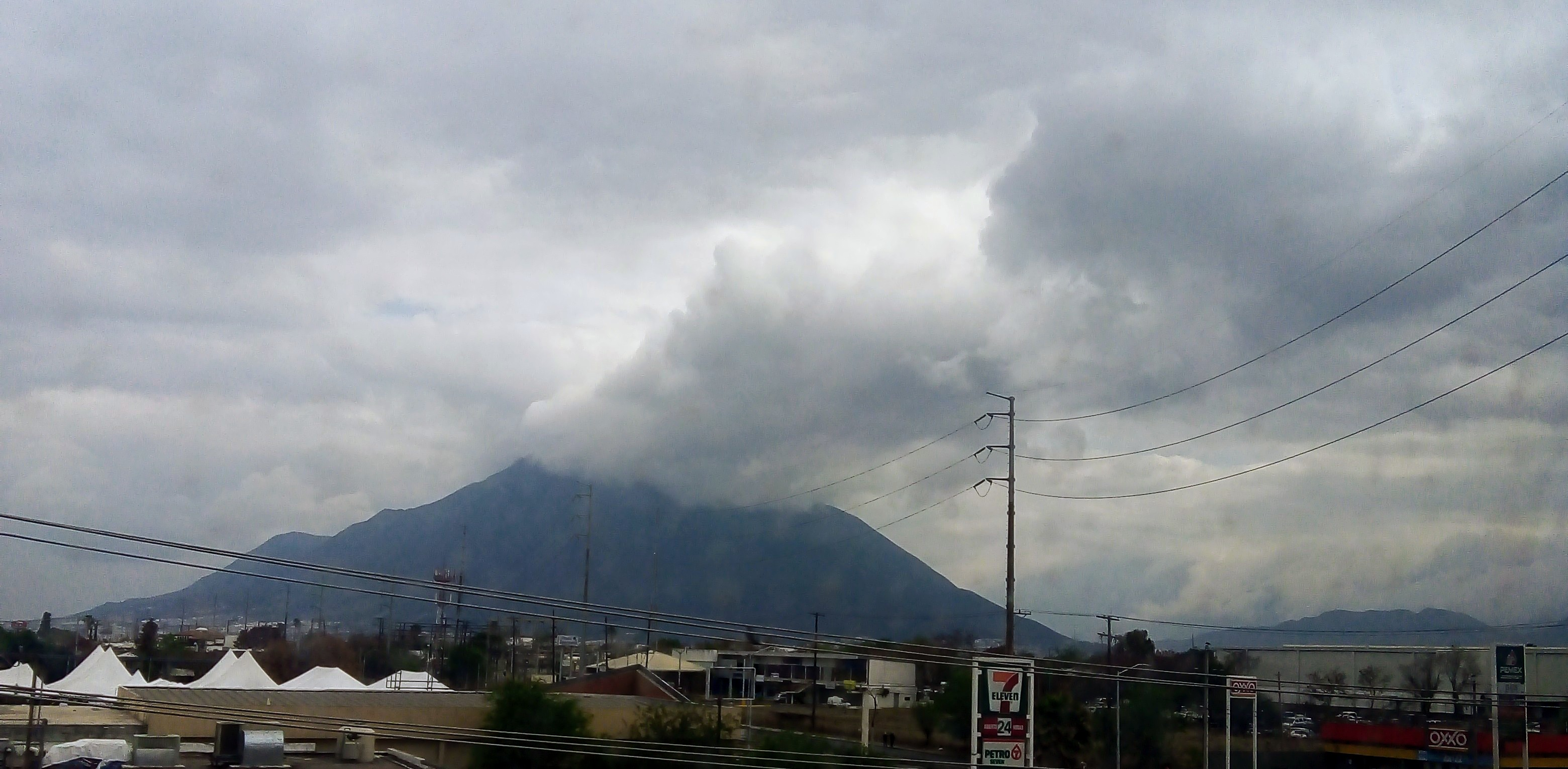
Clouds over Cerro de la Silla in 2021

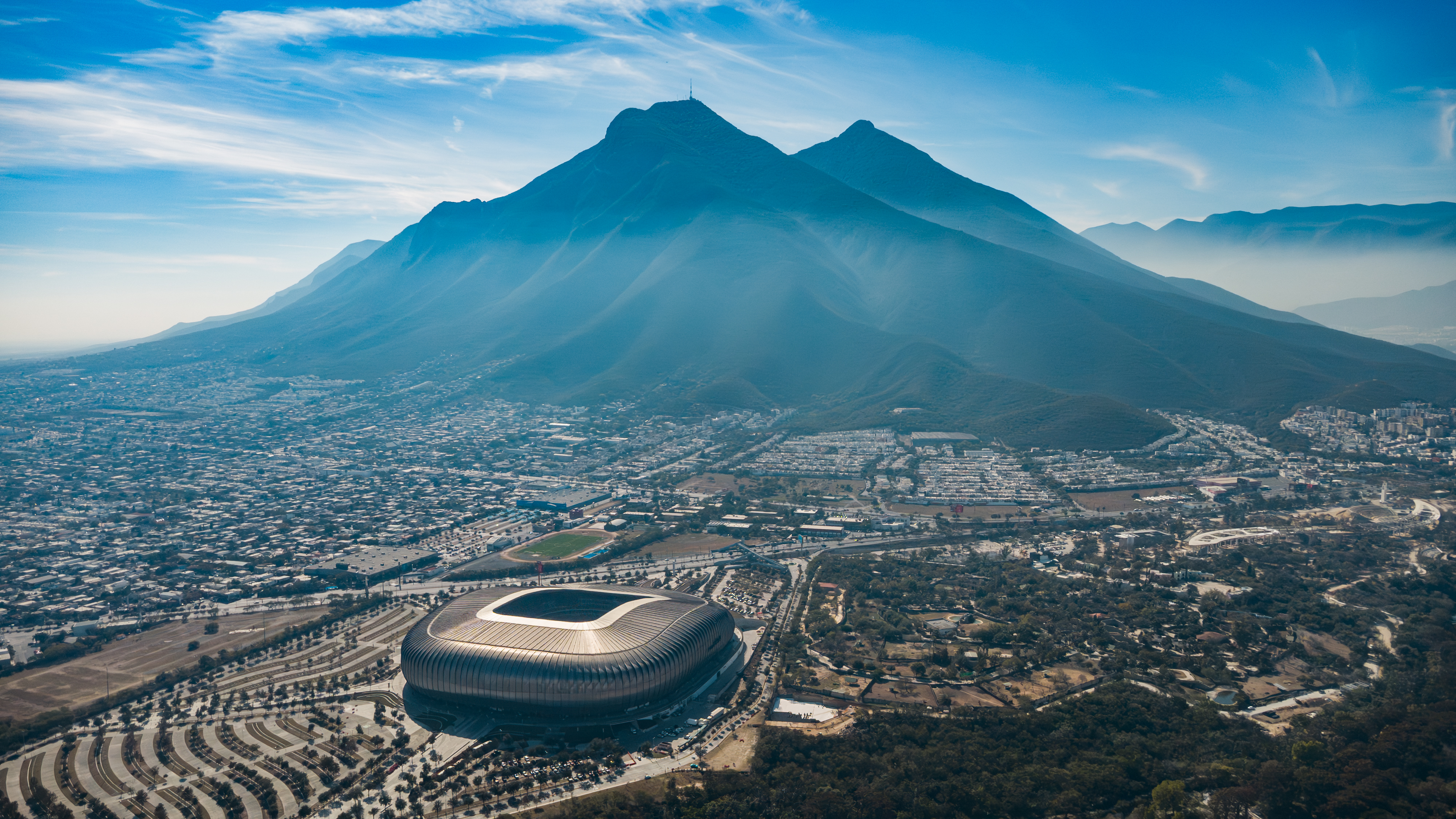
Cerro de la Silla in 2026 next to the Estadio BBVA
