= Santa Catarina Municipality =

Santa Catarina Municipality may refer to:

- Santa Catarina Municipality, Nuevo León
- Santa Catarina, Cape Verde
