= Juan Carlos Pérez Góngora =

Mexican lawyer and politician

Juan Carlos Pérez Góngora (born 27 August 1960) is a Mexican lawyer and politician who served in the lower house of Congress from 2003 to 2006.

Pérez Góngora received a bachelor's degree in accounting from the Universidad Regiomontana (UR) and a master's degree in taxes from the Instituto de Especialización para Ejecutivos, AC (IEE). He also has pursued doctorate studies at the Universidad Regiomontana.

He served as president of the Chamber of Commerce of Monterrey (Cámara de Comercio de Monterrey or CANACO) from 1993 to 1999.

In the 2003 mid-terms he was elected to the Chamber of Deputies to represent Nuevo León's 1st district.

Pérez Góngora was the PRI candidate for the 2009 San Pedro Garza García municipal presidency election.
