= Homero Niño de Rivera =

Mexican lawyer and politician

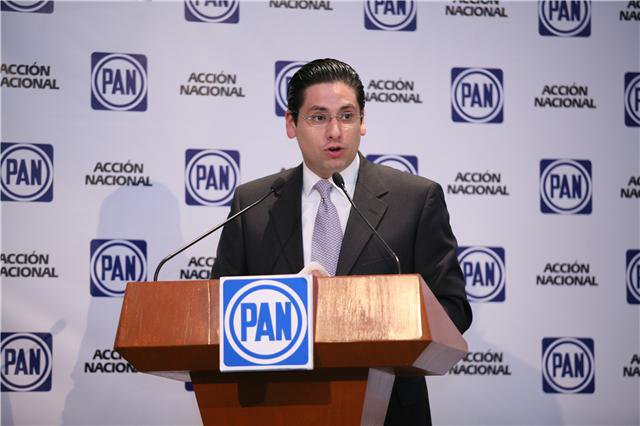
- Born: 23 March 1975 (age 51); Monterrey, Nuevo León, Mexico
- Occupation: Politician
- Political party: National Action Party

Homero Niño de Rivera Vela (born 23 March 1975) is a Mexican lawyer and politician from the National Action Party (PAN). He served as a federal deputy for the state of Nuevo León during the 62nd session of Congress where he voted in favor of the energy reform. He has also served as the secretary of City Council of the municipality of San Pedro Garza García, Nuevo León.

== Political career ==
Born in Monterrey, Nuevo León, Niño de Rivera Vela has participated in Mexican politics at all levels of government.

As a public servant he held various positions in the federal government during the administrations of presidents Vicente Fox and Felipe Calderón.

He collaborated with Vicente Fox in the presidential campaign, then within his government was Director of Information at the Secretariat of Communications and Transport (2001–2003), Director of Strategic Planning of the Secretariat of the Interior (2004–2005) and Corporate Communication Manager of PEMEX (2005–2006)

In the administration of President Felipe Calderón, he was Director of Social Communication of the Secretariat of Energy (2006–2007); then director of Social Communication of the Secretariat of the Interior (2008–2009) and Executive Coordinator of the Directorate General of PEMEX.

On 31 October 2015, he took office as the Secretary of the City Council of the municipal administration of San Pedro Garza García, Nuevo León 2015–2018.

== Elected office ==
In the 2012 general election, the National Action Party nominated Homero Niño de Rivera as its candidate for Nuevo León's 1st district, where he obtained the victory with more than 50% of the preference of the electorate, being the National Action Party candidate with the most votes nationwide.

Homero Niño de Rivera was the deputy who presented the proposed constitutional amendment to eliminate 200 plurinominal deputies and 28 national-list senators. He also presented in the same initiative was the motion to eliminate the constitutional immunity for lawmakers and public officials.

In the 2024 general election he was re-elected to the Chamber of Deputies for Nuevo León's 1st district.
