= Salto =

Salto may refer to:

== Places ==
=== Settlements ===
- Salto, Buenos Aires, Argentina
  - Salto Partido, a provincial subdivision
- Salto, São Paulo, Brazil
- Salto, Cape Verde
- Salto, Cidra, Puerto Rico
- Salto, San Sebastián, Puerto Rico
- Salto, Portugal, a parish in the municipality of Montalegre
- Salto, Uruguay
  - Salto Department
  - Roman Catholic Diocese of Salto, Uruguay

=== Rivers and lakes ===
- Lago del Salto, a lake in Lazio, Italy
- Salto River (Paraíba), Brazil
- Salto River (Costa Rica)

== People ==
- Álvaro Salto (born 1974), Spanish golfer
- Kasper Salto (born 1967), Danish industrial designer

== Other uses ==
- Salto (film), a 1965 Polish drama
- Salto, a somersault in gymnastics
- Salto, a type of suplex used in Greco-Roman, pro wrestling, amateur wrestling, and other contact sports
- Salto F.C., a Uruguayan football club
- Start + Flug H-101 Salto, an aerobatic glider
- reuSable strAtegic space Launcher Technologies & Operations, a program of the European Commission
- Salto (streaming service), a streaming service in France by France Télévisions, the TF1 Group and the Groupe M6

== See also ==
- Do Salto River (disambiguation)
- El Salto (disambiguation)
- Saltos, a barrio in Puerto Rico
- Siege of Salto, in the Uruguayan War, 1864
