= Huastec =

Huastec can refer to either:

- Huastec people, an indigenous group of Mexico
- Huastec language (also called "Wasteko" and "Teenek"), spoken by the Huastec people
- Huastec civilization, the pre-Columbian ancestors of the modern day Huastec people

== See also ==
- La Huasteca, a geographical and cultural region located in eastern Mexico along the Gulf of Mexico, associated with the Huastec people
- La Huasteca (climbing area), a municipal park in Monterrey, Mexico
