= Loma Larga Tunnel =

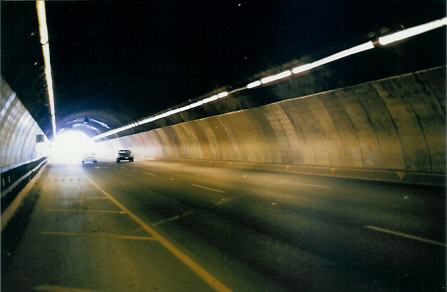
- Interactive map of Loma Larga Tunnel

Overview
- Coordinates: 25°39′30″N 100°20′12″W
- Status: Open

Loma Larga Tunnel (Spanish: Túnel de la Loma Larga) is a road tunnel beneath the Cerro de la Loma Larga, in the limits of the cities of Monterrey and San Pedro Garza García in Nuevo León, Mexico.

The work itself in fact is two tunnels, holding three lanes each (a fourth one is designed for emergencies).

The tunnel is almost two kilometers long. The lanes flowing south end in the municipality of San Pedro Garza García, while the ones flowing north end in Monterrey.

== Gallery ==
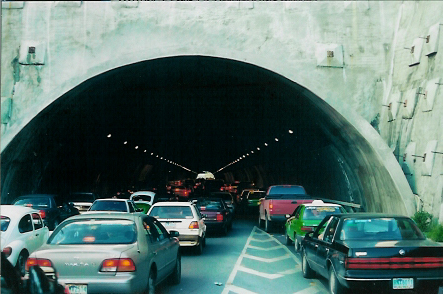

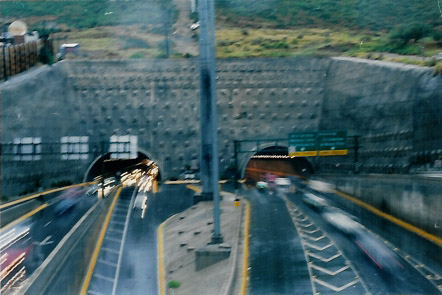

== See also ==
- Monterrey
