= Barrio de Tampiquito =

Tampiquito is a neighborhood in San Pedro Garza García, a city and a municipality of the Mexican state of Nuevo León. Tampiquito is one of the most traditional areas of San Pedro Garza García and is known for its craftsmen workshops. The first Tampiquito Craftsmen Fair took place on March 14 and 15 2009.

The symbol of Tampiquito is a white plaster lion with a golden mane, an object that can be encountered on the streets and houses of the neighborhood.
