= Santa Catarina Municipality, Nuevo León =

Santa Catarina
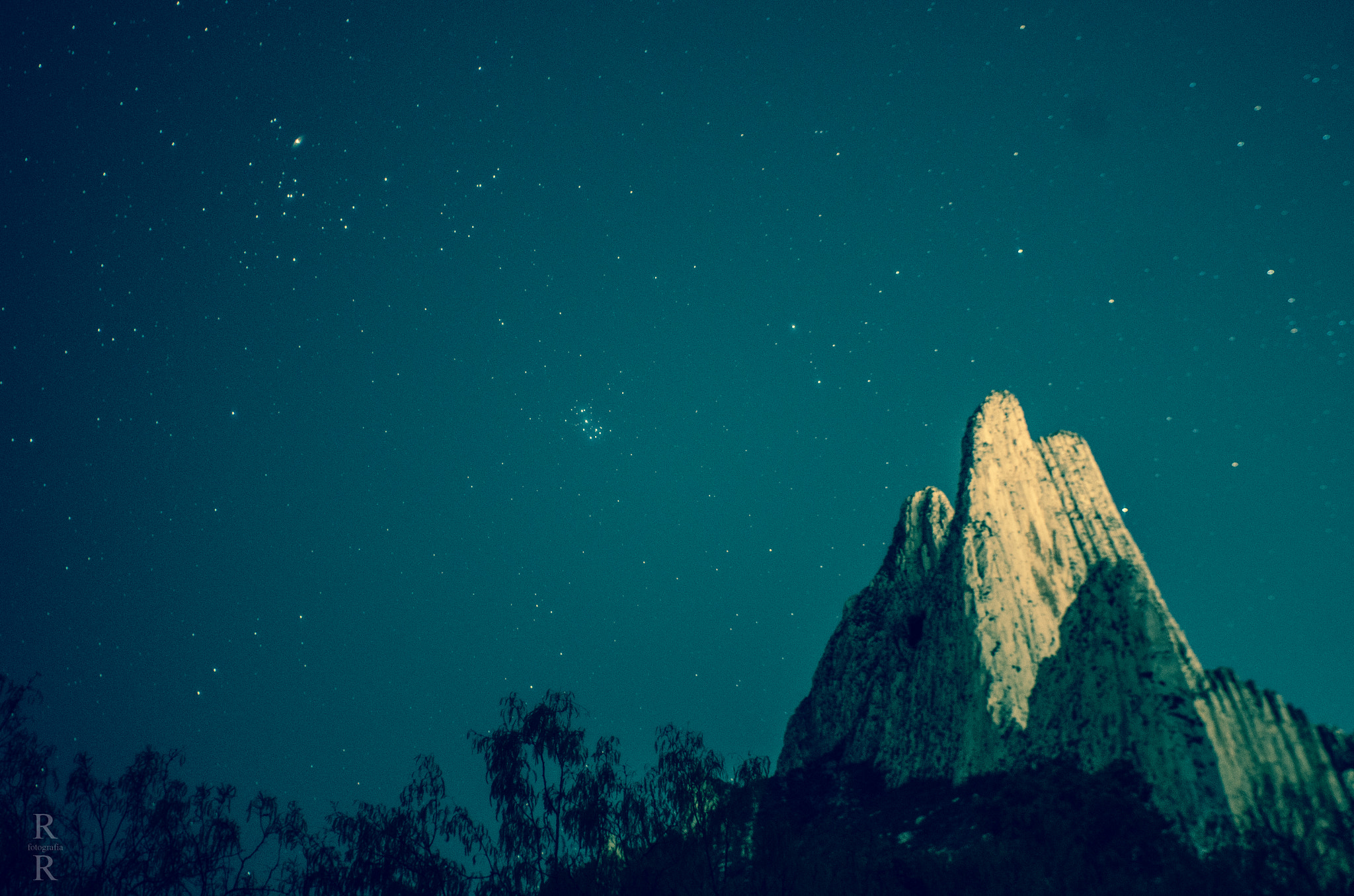
- Pico Independencia in La Huasteca

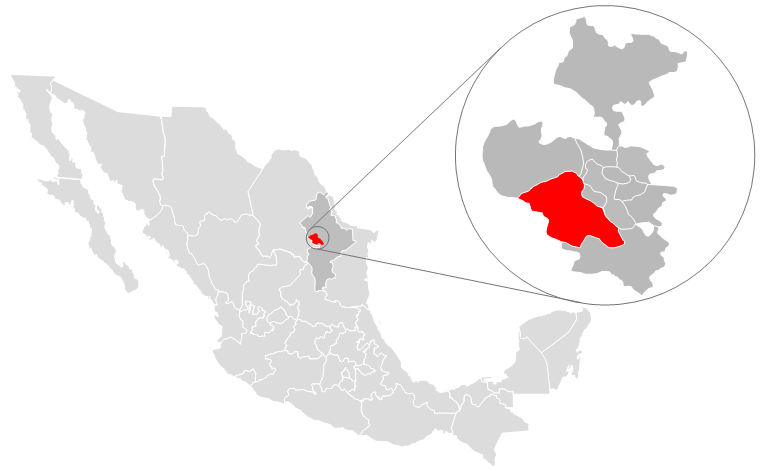
- Location of the municipality

- Location within Mexico
- Coordinates: 25°41′N 100°27′W
- Country: Mexico
- State: Nuevo León
- Seat: Santa Catarina

Government
  - Mayor: Jesús Nava Rivera (PAN)
  - Federal electoral district: Nuevo León's 1st

Population (2020)
  - Total: 306,322
- Time zone: UTC-6 (Zona Centro)

Santa Catarina is one of the municipalities of Nuevo León in Northern Mexico. Its municipal seat is located at Santa Catarina, as municipalities in Mexico are often named after their seats. It is included within the Monterrey metropolitan area.

The municipal government is headed by the municipal president of Santa Catarina (aka mayor of Santa Catarina).
