= Martha García Müller =

Mexican politician (born 1946)

- Born: 20 October 1946 (age 79); Tampico, Tamaulipas, Mexico
- Occupation: Politician
- Political party: PAN

Martha Margarita García Müller (born 20 October 1946) is a Mexican politician affiliated with the National Action Party (PAN). In the 2006 general election she was elected to the Chamber of Deputies to represent Nuevo León's 1st district during the 60th session of Congress.
