= Víctor Alejandro Balderas =

Mexican politician (born 1967)

- Born: 24 April 1967 (age 59); San Nicolás de los Garza, Nuevo León, Mexico
- Occupation: Politician
- Political party: PAN

Víctor Alejandro Balderas Vaquera (born 24 April 1967) is a Mexican politician from the National Action Party (PAN). In the 2009 mid-terms he was elected to the Chamber of Deputies to represent Nuevo León's 1st district during the 61st session of Congress.
