= Celita Alamilla =

Mexican politician and researcher

- Born: 20 June 1943 (age 83); Comalcalco, Tabasco, Mexico
- Occupations: Politician and researcher
- Political party: PAN

Celita Trinidad Alamilla Padrón (born 20 June 1943) is a Mexican politician and researcher from the National Action Party (PAN). In the 2000 general election she was elected to the Chamber of Deputies to represent Nuevo León's 1st district during the 58th session of Congress.
