= 1st federal electoral district of Nuevo León =

Federal electoral district of Mexico

Nuevo León's 1st
- Electoral district of the Chamber of Deputies of Mexico

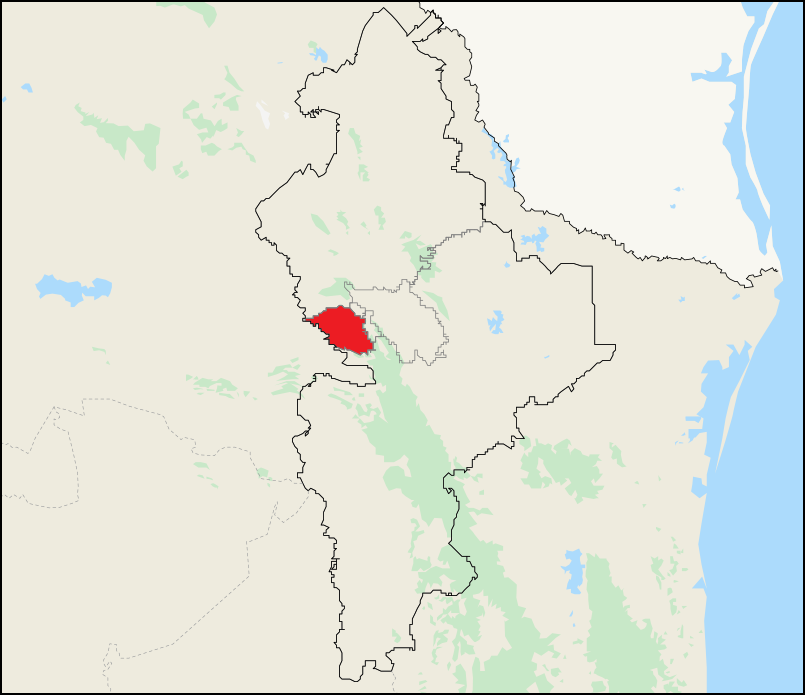

Incumbent
- Member: Homero Niño de Rivera Vela
- Party: ▌National Action Party
- Congress: 66th (2024–2027)

District
- State: Nuevo León
- Head town: Santa Catarina
- Coordinates: 25°41′N 100°27′W
- Covers: Santa Catarina, San Pedro Garza García
- PR region: Second
- Precincts: 164
- Population: 439,175 (2020 census)

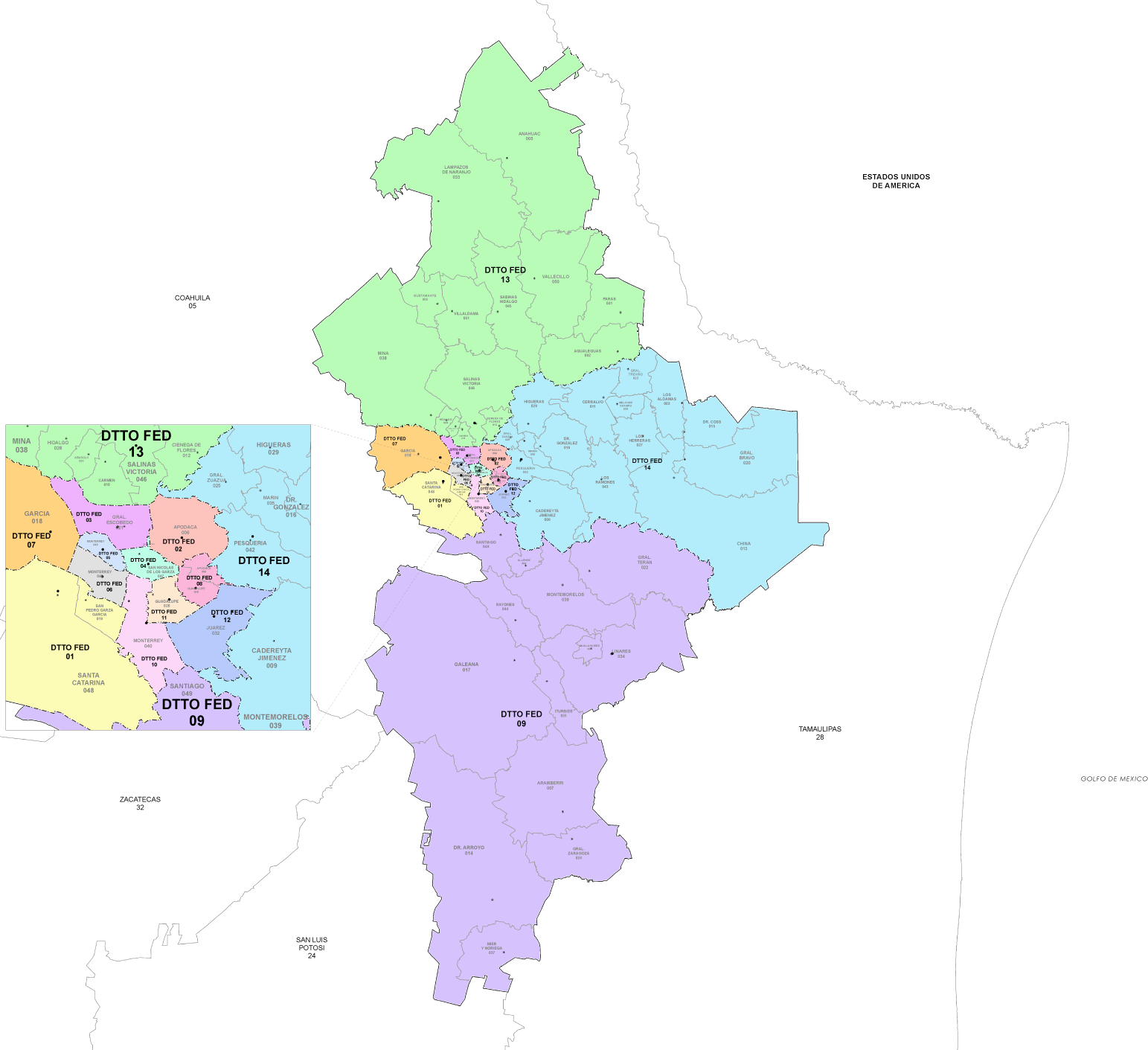
Nuevo León under the 2023 districting plan

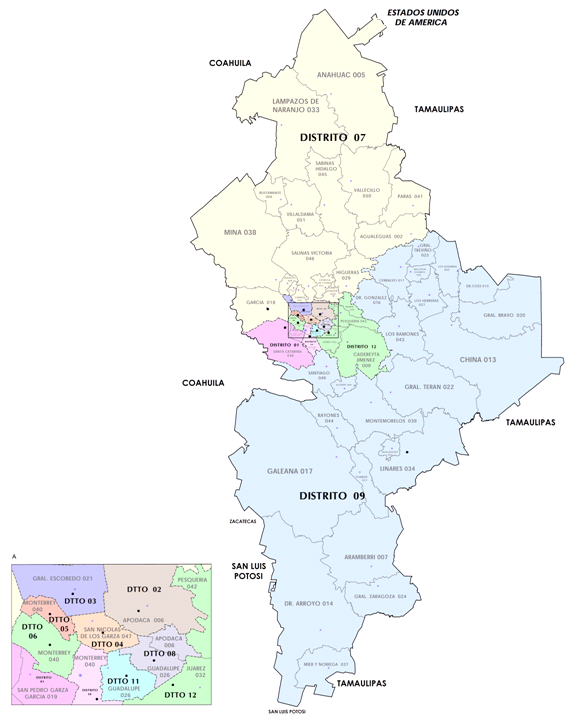
Nuevo León's districts in 2017–2022

The 1st federal electoral district of Nuevo León (Spanish: Distrito electoral federal 01 de Nuevo León) is one of the 300 electoral districts into which Mexico is divided for elections to the federal Chamber of Deputies and one of 14 such districts in the state of Nuevo León.

It elects one deputy to the lower house of Congress for each three-year legislative session by means of the first-past-the-post system. Votes cast in the district also count towards the calculation of proportional representation ("plurinominal") deputies elected from the second region.

The current member for the district, elected in the 2024 general election, is Homero Niño de Rivera Vela of the National Action Party (PAN).

== District territory ==
Under the 2023 districting plan adopted by the National Electoral Institute (INE), which is to be used for the 2024, 2027 and 2030 federal elections, Nuevo León's congressional seat allocation rose from 12 to 14. The first district is in the western part of the Monterrey metropolitan area and covers 164 electoral precincts (secciones electorales) across two of the state's municipalities:

- Santa Catarina and San Pedro Garza García

The district's head town (cabecera distrital), where results from individual polling stations are gathered together and tallied, is the city of Santa Catarina. The district reported a population of 439,175 in the 2020 census.

== Previous districting schemes ==
Evolution of electoral district numbers
	1974	1978	1996	2005	2017	2023
Nuevo León	7	11	11	12	12	14
Chamber of Deputies	196	300				

2017–2022

Between 2017 and 2022, as in the 2023 plan, the district covered Santa Catarina and San Pedro Garza García and had its head town at Santa Catarina.

2005–2017

Under the 2005 districting plan, the district had the same configuration as in the 2017 and 2023 schemes.

1996–2005

From 1996 to 2005, the district's head town was at Santa Catarina but it covered a larger area in the north-west of the state, comprising seven municipalities: Anáhuac, Bustamante, García, San Pedro Garza García, Lampazos de Naranjo, Mina and Santa Catarina.

1978–1996

The districting scheme in force from 1978 to 1996 was the result of the 1977 electoral reforms, which increased the number of single-member seats in the Chamber of Deputies from 196 to 300. Under that plan, Nuevo León's seat allocation rose from 7 to 11. The first district's head town was the state capital, Monterrey, and it covered a portion of that city.

== Deputies returned to Congress ==
(Mexico) National parties
- Current
- PAN
- PRI
- PT
- PVEM
- MC
- Morena
- PAZ
- Somos
- Defunct or local only
- PLM
- PNR
- PRM
- PNM
- PP
- PPS
- PARM
- PFCRN
- CON
- PANAL
- PSD
- PES
- PES
- PRD

Nuevo León's 1st district
Election	Deputy	Party	Term	Legislature
1916	Manuel Amaya		1916–1917	Constituent Congress of Querétaro
...
1979	Fernando Canales Clariond	National Action Party (Mexico)	1979–1982	51st Congress
1982	Alberto Santos de Hoyos	Institutional Revolutionary Party	1982–1985	52nd Congress
1985	Javier Lobo Morales	Institutional Revolutionary Party	1985–1988	53rd Congress
1988	Benjamín Clariond Reyes-Retana	Institutional Revolutionary Party	1988–1991	54th Congress
1991	José Rodolfo Treviño Salinas	Institutional Revolutionary Party	1991–1994	55th Congress
1994	José Natividad González Parás (Note: On 19 July 1995 González Parás requested a leave of absence from his seat to serve in the federal Secretariat of the Interior. He requested a second leave of absence on 8 January 1997 to contend (unsuccessfully) for the governorship of Nuevo León. He was replaced his alternate, Morales Somohano, during his absences.); Pedro Morales Somohano	Institutional Revolutionary Party	1994–1997	56th Congress
1997	Trinidad Escobedo Aguilar	National Action Party (Mexico)	1997–2000	57th Congress
2000	Celita Trinidad Alamilla Padrón	National Action Party (Mexico)	2000–2003	58th Congress
2003	Juan Carlos Pérez Góngora	Institutional Revolutionary Party	2003–2006	59th Congress
2006	Martha Margarita García Müller	National Action Party (Mexico)	2006–2009	60th Congress
2009	Víctor Alejandro Balderas Vaquera	National Action Party (Mexico)	2009–2012	61st Congress
2012	Homero Ricardo Niño de Rivera Vela	National Action Party (Mexico)	2012–2015	62nd Congress
2015	Ximena Tamariz García	National Action Party (Mexico)	2015–2018	63rd Congress
2018	Hernán Salinas Wolberg	National Action Party (Mexico)	2018–2021	64th Congress
2021	Héctor Israel Castillo Olivares	National Action Party (Mexico)	2021–2024	65th Congress
2024	Homero Ricardo Niño de Rivera Vela	National Action Party (Mexico)	2024–2027	66th Congress

== Presidential elections ==
Nuevo León's 1st district
Election	District won by	Party or coalition	%
2018	Ricardo Anaya Cortés	Por México al Frente	46.8304
2024	Bertha Xóchitl Gálvez Ruiz	Fuerza y Corazón por México	47.2094
