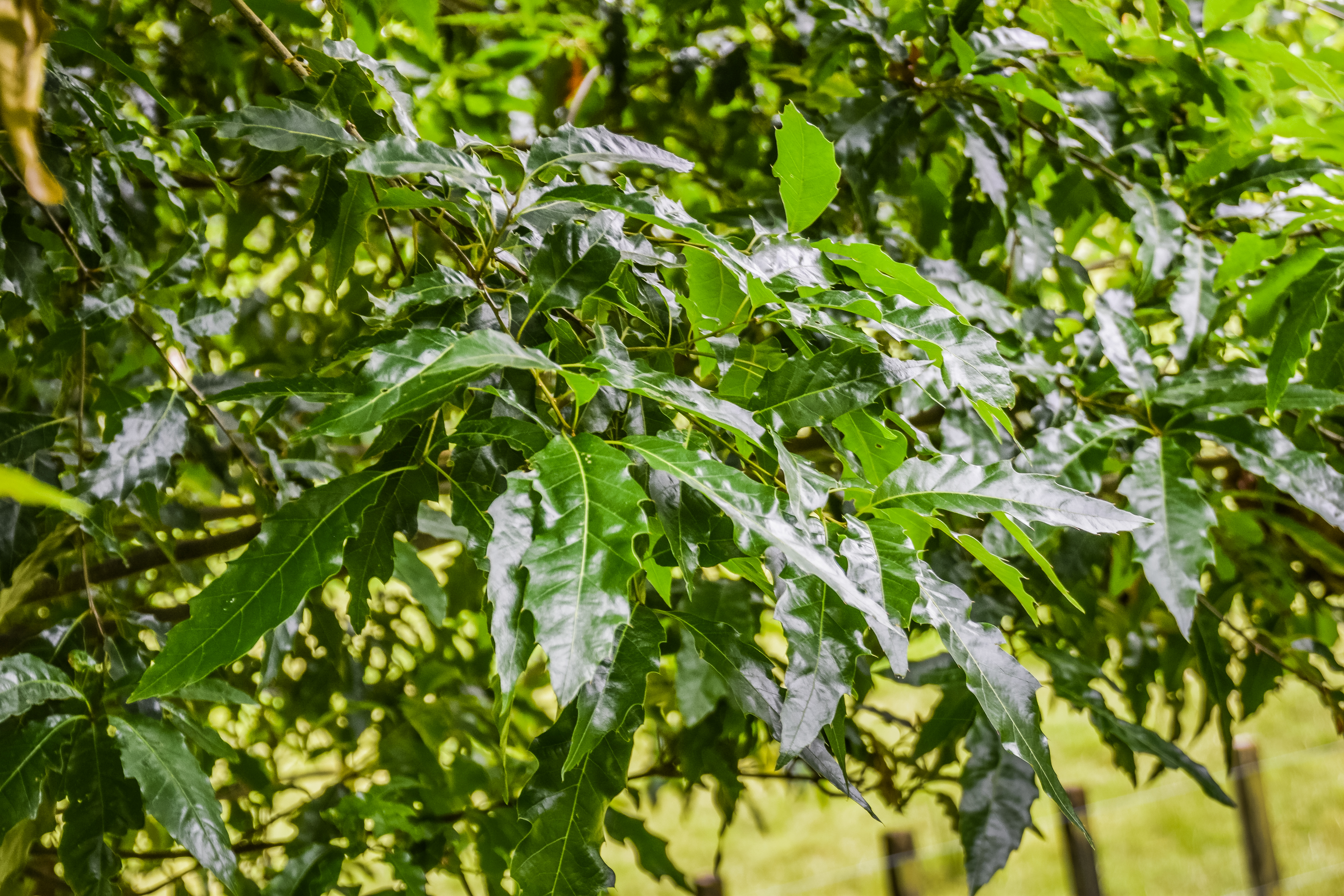
- Quercus canbyi x Q. xalapensis hybrid in Hackfalls Arboretum

Conservation status
- Least Concern (IUCN 3.1)

Scientific classification
- Kingdom: Plantae
- Clade: Embryophytes
- Clade: Tracheophytes
- Clade: Spermatophytes
- Clade: Angiosperms
- Clade: Eudicots
- Clade: Rosids
- Order: Fagales
- Family: Fagaceae
- Genus: Quercus
- Subgenus: Quercus subg. Quercus
- Section: Quercus sect. Lobatae
- Species: Q. canbyi

Binomial name
- Quercus canbyi Trel.

Synonyms
- Quercus alamarensis C.H.Mull.; Quercus canbyi f. ascendens Trel.; Quercus canbyi f. attenuata C.H.Mull.; Quercus canbyi f. berlandieri Trel.; Quercus canbyi f. concolor Trel. & C.H.Müll.; Quercus canbyi f. karwinskii (Trel.) C.H.Mull.; Quercus canbyi f. pedunculata C.H.Mull.; Quercus canbyi f. setacea C.H.Mull.; Quercus canbyi f. subovatifolia C.H.Mull.; Quercus canbyi f. typica A.Camus; Quercus graciliformis f. parvilobata (C.H.Mull.) C.H.Mull.; Quercus graciliformis var. parvilobata C.H.Mull.; Quercus graciliramis C.H.Mull.; Quercus karwinskii Trel.

= Quercus canbyi =

Species of tree

Quercus canbyi (Canby oak, Sierra oak), is a North American species of oak tree.

== Description ==
Quercus canbyi is a semi-evergreen - evergreen tree, up to 40–50 feet (12–15 metres) tall in cultivation. Although, it can reach up to 80 feet (24 metres) in the wild in Mexico. It starts as a pyramidal form and then matures into an open irregular shape. It can reach a spread of 30–40 feet (9.1–12.2 metres) wide.

The dark, glossy green leaves are 6–8 inches (15–20 centimetres) long and have serrated edges. The petioles can have a reddish hue. It blooms in March and the acorns are then seen in August.

It has been distinguished from Quercus graciliformis by its twig shape and by producing acorns biennially rather than annually; however as of February 2023, Plants of the World Online regards them as synonymous.

== Taxonomy ==
Quercus canbyi was first described by William Trelease in 1924. It is placed in Quercus section Lobatae.

== Distribution ==
The species has been found only in Texas and in northeast Mexico.

== Conservation ==
Quercus canbyi was assessed in 2016 for the IUCN Red List as "least concern".

== Cultivation ==
Quercus canbyi will tolerate most kinds of soils and is used in gardens to provide shade.
