= Santa Catarina, Nuevo León =

Santa Catarina
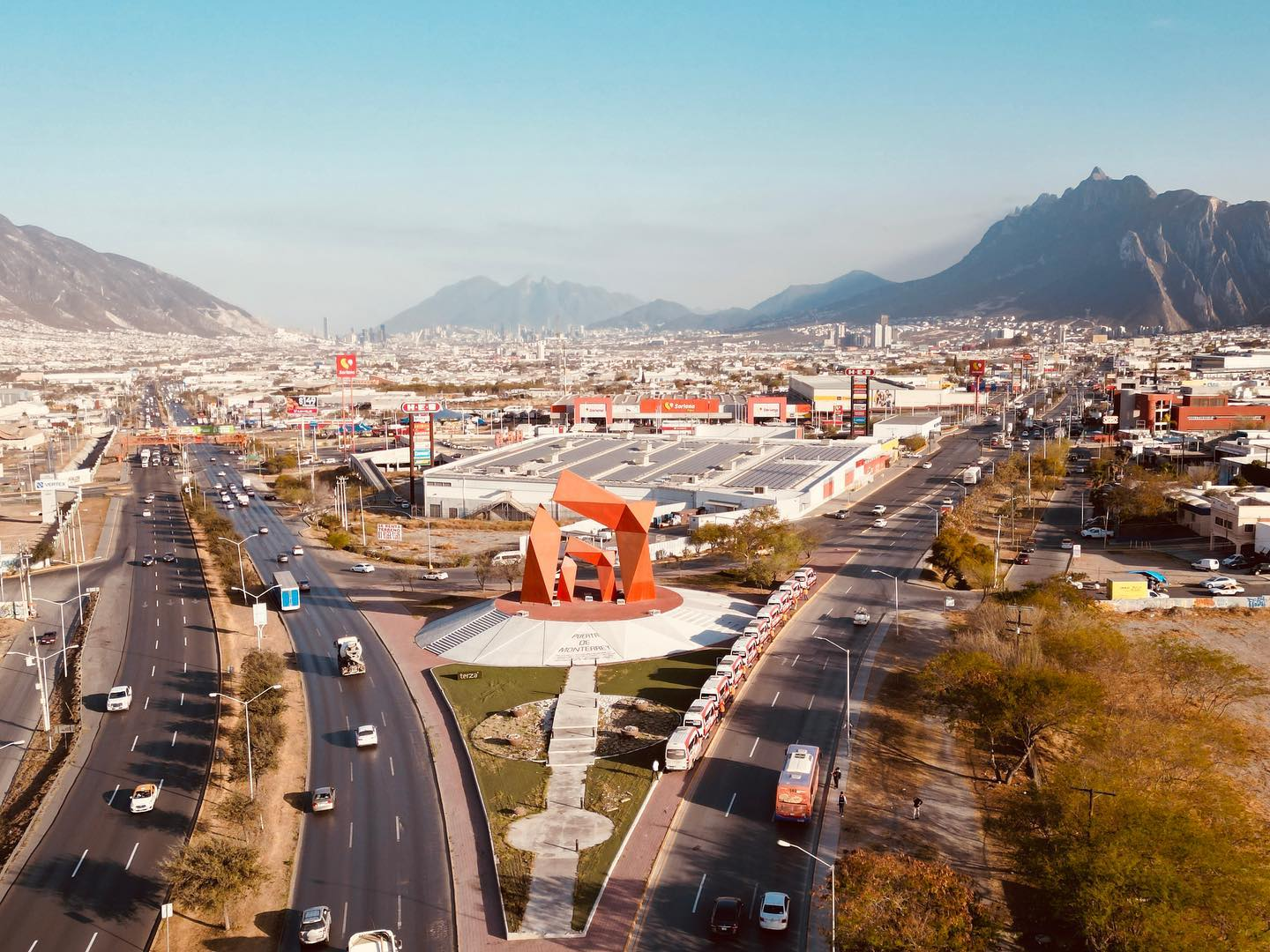
- La puerta de Monterrey

- Location within Nuevo León Location within Mexico
- Coordinates: 25°41′N 100°27′W
- Country: Mexico
- State: Nuevo León
- Municipality: Santa Catarina
- Founded: November 20, 1596

Government
  - Mayor: Jesús Nava Rivera (PAN)
  - Federal electoral district: Nuevo León's 1st

Area
  - City: 46.59 km^{2} (17.99 sq mi)
- Elevation: 690 m (2,260 ft)

Population (2020 census)
  - City: 304,052
  - Density: 6,526/km^{2} (16,900/sq mi)
  - Metro: 5,341,177
- Time zone: UTC-6 (Zona Centro)
- Website: https://stacatarina.mx/

Santa Catarina is a city in the Mexican state of Nuevo León. It serves as the seat of the municipality of the same name and is part of the Monterrey Metropolitan area.

== History ==
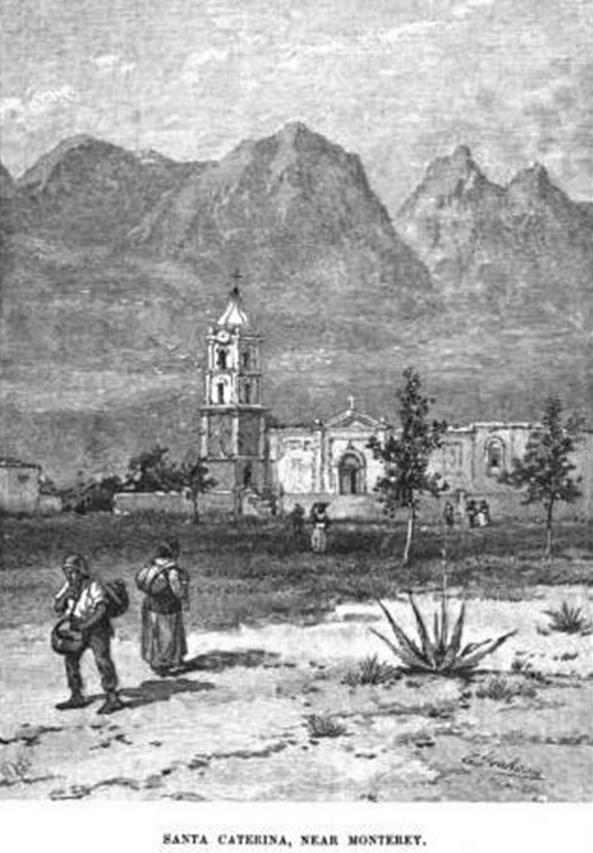
Church of Santa Catarina, Nuevo León, circa 1890.

The name of this city comes from the Catholic Saint Catherine of Alexandria. The city of Santa Catarina was not "founded" in a traditional manner; at the beginning, it was only a resting point for travelers between Monterrey and Saltillo. The first recorded name was "Estancia de Santa Catarina" (Shelter of Santa Catarina).

During the French Invasion of Mexico in the second half of the 19th century, President Benito Juárez spent some days in Santa Catarina while traveling to Monterrey, and it was during this time that he elevated its status to a town (villa). The category of town was maintained until 1979 when the state government elevated its status to a city.

== Geography ==
Santa Catarina is located about 15 kilometers southwest of central Monterrey. As of the 2005 census, its population was 259,202 in the city and 259,896 in the municipality. The city and municipality both rank sixth in population in the state. The municipality has an area of 984.5 km^{2} (380.1 sq mi) and includes numerous very small localities outside of the city itself.

Most of the Cumbres de Monterrey National Park, including the canyon of La Huasteca is located within Santa Catarina.

Also a certain portion of Cerro de las Mitras is located in Santa Catarina.

=== Climate ===
Climate data for Santa Catarina, Nuevo León (1951–2010)
Month	Jan	Feb	Mar	Apr	May	Jun	Jul	Aug	Sep	Oct	Nov	Dec	Year
Record high °C (°F)	35.0 (95.0)	39.0 (102.2)	40.0 (104.0)	43.0 (109.4)	49.0 (120.2)	45.0 (113.0)	46.0 (114.8)	42.0 (107.6)	41.0 (105.8)	40.0 (104.0)	39.2 (102.6)	38.3 (100.9)	49.0 (120.2)
Mean daily maximum °C (°F)	19.0 (66.2)	21.5 (70.7)	25.5 (77.9)	28.8 (83.8)	31.1 (88.0)	32.3 (90.1)	32.6 (90.7)	32.8 (91.0)	29.7 (85.5)	26.1 (79.0)	22.4 (72.3)	19.2 (66.6)	26.8 (80.2)
Daily mean °C (°F)	13.3 (55.9)	15.4 (59.7)	19.0 (66.2)	22.6 (72.7)	25.3 (77.5)	27.0 (80.6)	27.2 (81.0)	27.2 (81.0)	24.9 (76.8)	21.0 (69.8)	16.9 (62.4)	13.6 (56.5)	21.1 (70.0)
Mean daily minimum °C (°F)	7.6 (45.7)	9.2 (48.6)	12.5 (54.5)	16.5 (61.7)	19.5 (67.1)	21.6 (70.9)	21.8 (71.2)	21.7 (71.1)	20.1 (68.2)	16.0 (60.8)	11.4 (52.5)	8.0 (46.4)	15.5 (59.9)
Record low °C (°F)	−5.0 (23.0)	−3.0 (26.6)	0.0 (32.0)	5.0 (41.0)	7.0 (44.6)	11.0 (51.8)	5.5 (41.9)	13.0 (55.4)	3.0 (37.4)	1.0 (33.8)	−1.0 (30.2)	−4.0 (24.8)	−5.0 (23.0)
Average precipitation mm (inches)	12.6 (0.50)	11.1 (0.44)	8.5 (0.33)	17.1 (0.67)	32.1 (1.26)	41.5 (1.63)	25.3 (1.00)	54.9 (2.16)	127.4 (5.02)	42.7 (1.68)	14.8 (0.58)	12.5 (0.49)	400.5 (15.77)
Average precipitation days (≥ 0.1 mm)	2.6	2.4	2.1	3.2	3.8	3.8	2.8	4.2	7.2	4.8	3.0	2.3	42.2
Source: Servicio Meteorológico Nacional
