= Do Salto River =

Do Salto River may refer to:

- Do Salto River (Paraná), a river of Paraná state in southern Brazil
- Do Salto River (Rio de Janeiro), a river of Rio de Janeiro state in southeastern Brazil
