= Escalando Fronteras =

The official Escalando Fronteras logo

Escalando Fronteras (in English, "Climbing Borders") is a not-for-profit organization (in Mexico, an asociación civil) founded in 2014 that reaches out to at-risk youth in the "poverty polygons" of Monterrey, Mexico through the sport of rock climbing. Escalando Fronteras' mission is "to empower youth through climbing and education." The program takes groups of at-risk youth to the local indoor climbing gyms and national park Parque La Huasteca with the help of the local community, volunteers, psychologists, and professional athletes.

== Origins ==
Conceived by researchers Nicklas Karlsson and Javier Hernandez, the organization was founded by local professor Dr. Nadia Vázquez to target at-risk youth in the marginalized regions of the metropolitan area of Monterrey, Mexico in 2014. The program offers community support and life skills, based on research that sports like climbing can "be used as a tool for positive change for youth in underdeveloped areas of the world."

== History ==
In 2014, Dr. Vazquez began a six-month pilot-project and registered as a NGO in Mexico. December of that year, the Board of Directors formed, and at the same time Escalando Fronteras launched the "Climbing Beyond Cartels" campaign on fundraising platform IndieGoGo, raising $16k. The program has garnered media coverage from NatGeo Blog, Mashable, Reuters, and climbing magazines Desnivel and Rock & Ice.

Rock climber Alex Honnold, famous for soloing one of the Mexico's tallest climbable cliff faces, was among the campaign's donors, for the perk of naming a new climbing route bolted by Escalando Fronteras mentor Gareth (Gaz) Leah. Other perks were artwork donated by local artist Ácaro and internationally-known climber and artist Renan Ozturk.
