= El Salto Dam =

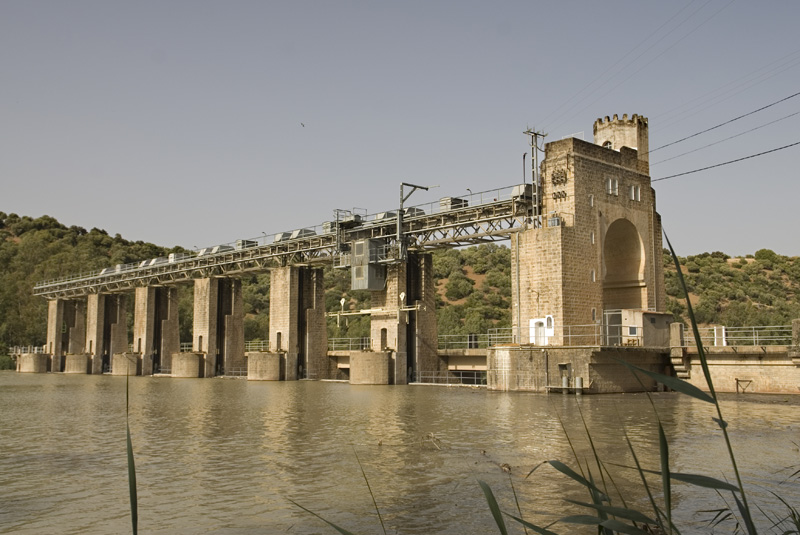
- El Salto Dam on the Guadalquivir River.

- Location of El Salto Dam in the autonomous community of Andalusia.
- Official name: Presa El Salto
- Country: Spain
- Location: El Carpio, Province of Córdoba
- Coordinates: 37°58′29″N 4°29′32″W
- Purpose: Power, irrigation
- Status: Operational
- Construction began: 1918
- Opening date: 1922
- Owner: Endesa

Dam and spillways
- Type of dam: Barrage
- Impounds: Guadalquivir
- Height (foundation): 20.7 m (68 ft)
- Length: 253 m (830 ft)
- Elevation at crest: 140 m (460 ft)

Reservoir
- Creates: El Carpio Reservoir
- Total capacity: 18,000,000 m^{3} (15,000 acre⋅ft)
- Normal elevation: 137.25 m (450.3 ft)

El Carpio Power Station
- Coordinates: 37°57′56″N 4°30′0″W
- Commission date: 1922
- Type: Run-of-the-river
- Hydraulic head: 19.74 m (64.8 ft)
- Turbines: 3 Francis turbines
- Installed capacity: 8.4 MW

El Salto Dam (Spanish: Presa El Salto), located on the Guadalquivir River in the municipal district of El Carpio (Province of Córdoba, Spain), comprises a dam and its corresponding hydroelectric power station.

Built for storage of water for electricity generation and irrigation, the dam is situated near the 3.3 km mark on the Pedro Abad-Adamuz highway (CO-412). Its Neo-Mudéjar design is the result of a collaboration between architect Casto Fernández Shaw and engineers Carlos Mendoza and Antonio del Águila. The Madrid-based engineering consulting firm Mengemor undertook construction of the dam between 1918 and 1922.

Since its inception, the dam has proved valuable to the local population for its contribution to the development and economic expansion of the area.

== Design ==
Built on the site of some old water mills, the dam creates a grade in the riverbed through the use of two abutments, one on each bank of the river, and five interior buttresses. The buttresses, which sustain the bridge and the six sluice gates, also hold up the metal structure bearing the machines that operate the gates. The abutment on the right bank forms an arched portal over the roadway and houses the access stairway to the control room, whose crowning octagonal turret once bore a dome. This dome, the horseshoe arch and alfiz, the simple and double windows, and the handrail supports all belong to the Neo-Mudéjar style.

The entire concrete structure is covered with a facing of blocks in imitation of stretcher and header bond masonry.

The upper metal structure, a lattice box girder, initially held a wooden platform that has since been replaced by a grate. The motors that power the gears and chains used to raise the sluice gates are housed here in protective casings.

A traveling bridge crane projects from the upstream side of the girder. From within its two-story wooden cabin, the operator is able to stack metal beams in slots parallel to the sluice gates in order to retain the water and allow the gates to be isolated. The crane is also used to lift motor and gear assembly casings.

== El Carpio Hydroelectric Power Station ==
El Carpio Power Station is situated on the lower side of a meander of the Guadalquivir, across from the dam. Also built in 1922, the plant uses three turbine generators to produce electricity. It belongs to Endesa, Spain's largest utility company.

As a run-of-the-river power plant, which utilizes the natural flow of water, it has practically no water reserve; its generating capacity therefore depends on the condition of the river. Water is drawn from the upstream dam through a 1-kilometer-long (3,300-foot) tunnel and deposited next to the power station in a small tank capable of holding 18,000,000 m^{3} (15,000 acre⋅ft). From there, it passes through the turbines and returns to the river.

The kinetic energy from flowing water is used by the Francis turbines at a flow rate of 19 cubic meters per second (670 cu ft/s) per machine to generate mechanical energy. The generators then convert this energy into an alternating current, according to Faraday's Law of Induction, and create an electrical signal which must then coincide with the 50 Hz frequency used by the Spanish power grid. To reach this frequency, the turbines and in turn the generators must rotate at a speed of 214 rpm. Finally, the electric tension must be raised by the plant's transformers in order to reduce energy loss during travel along power lines.

The power station was, like the dam, built with a view to aesthetics. The exterior features dressed stone blocks, while its rooftop turrets crowned by brick domes have a remarkably historicist and expressionist character. Other details stand out as well, like the elephant head supporting a balcony, which was produced by sculptor Juan Cristóbal González. Presented in Paris at the Decorative Arts Exposition of 1921, the building won a gold medal.
