= Cerro de Chipinque =

Mountain in Nuevo León, Mexico

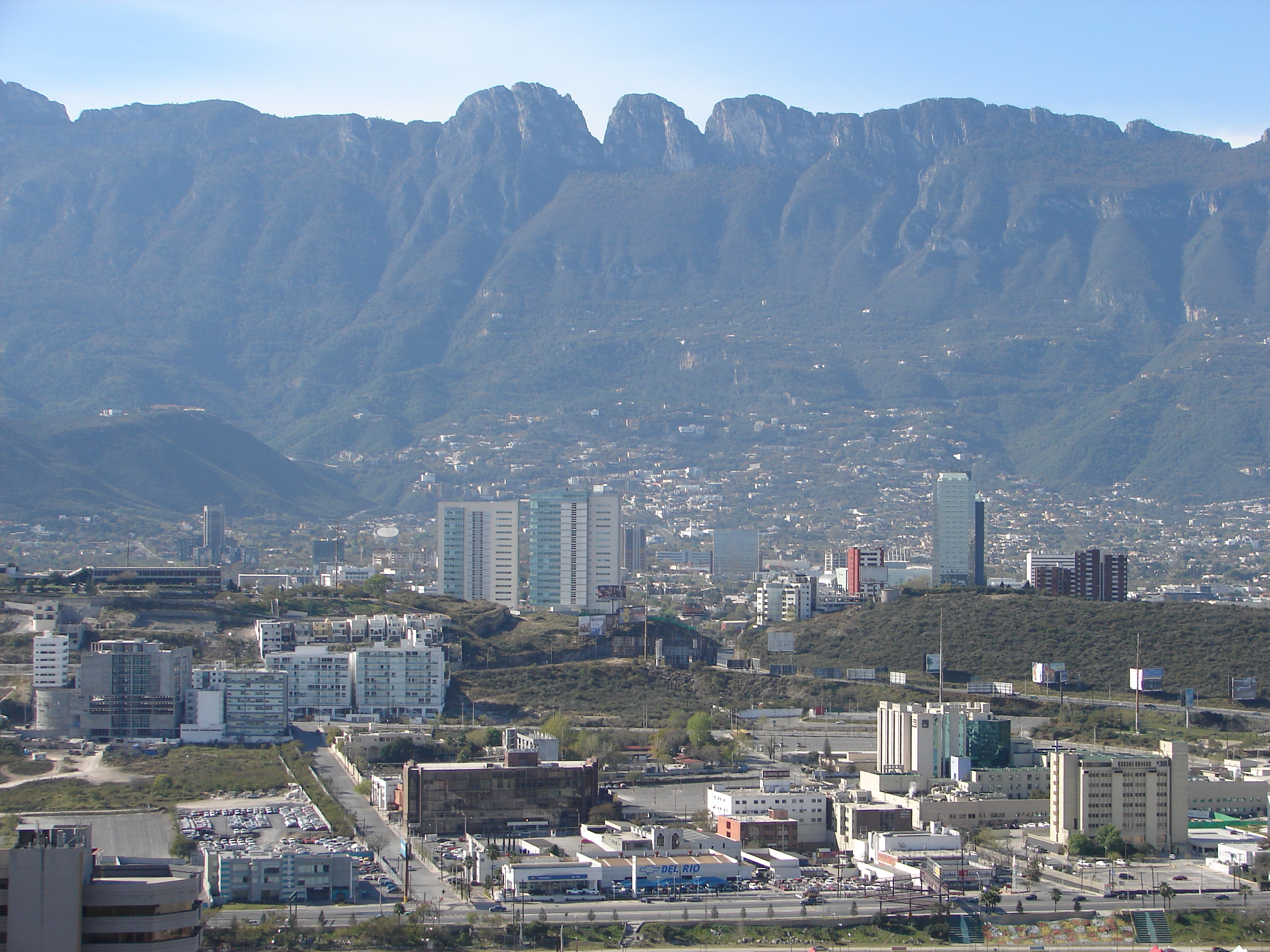
- Cerro de Chipinque seen from Monterrey

Highest point
- Elevation: 2,229 m (7,313 ft)

Geography
- Location within Mexico
- Location: San Pedro Garza García, Monterrey, Santa Catarina; Nuevo León
- Country: Mexico
- Parent range: Sierra Madre Oriental

Geology
- Mountain type: Mountain

The Cerro de Chipinque is a mountain in the San Pedro Garza García, Monterrey and Santa Catarina municipalities; state of Nuevo León, Mexico. The mountain is part of the Sierra Madre Oriental range and the Cumbres de Monterrey National Park. The summit reaches 2,229 meters above sea level. The mountain is a symbol for the Monterrey metropolitan area. The mountain is surrounded by Santa Catarina valley, San Pedro valley, mount El Mirador, la Silla river, Ballesteros Canyon and La Huasteca canyon. The “Parque ecológico Chipinque” is on the north slope of the mountain. The mountain's name is believed to have originated from the Nahuatl word "chichipinqui" meaning small rain or from the name of an indigenous chief.

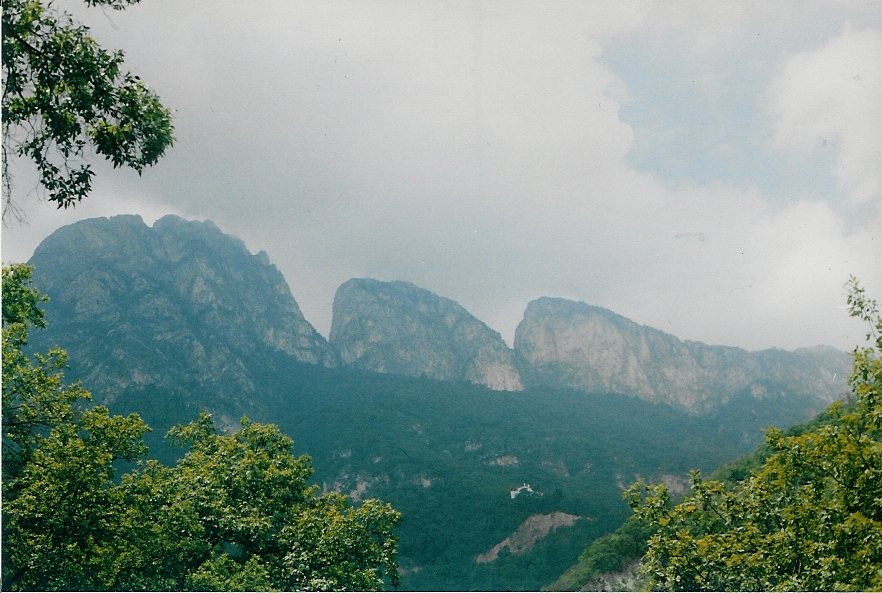
La eme seen from the plateau of Chipinque Park.

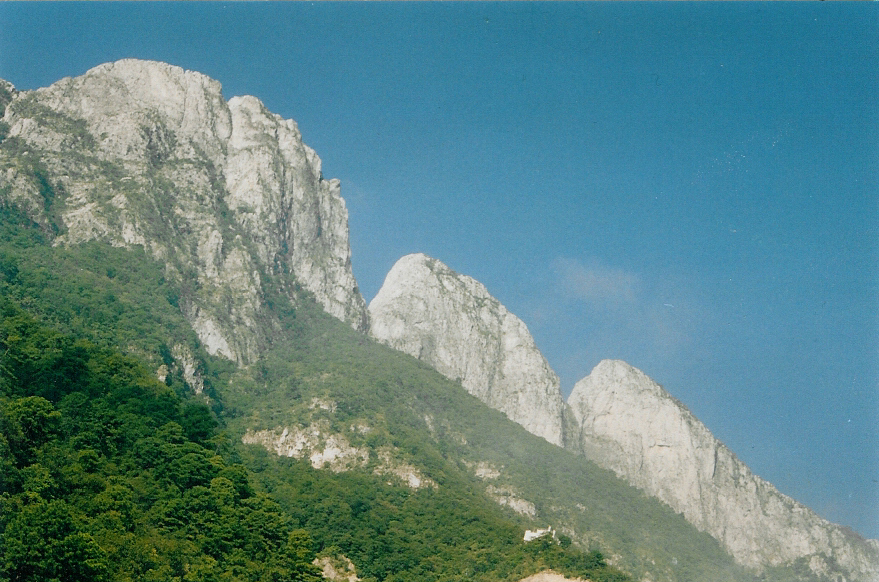
La eme seen from a hotel at the plateau.

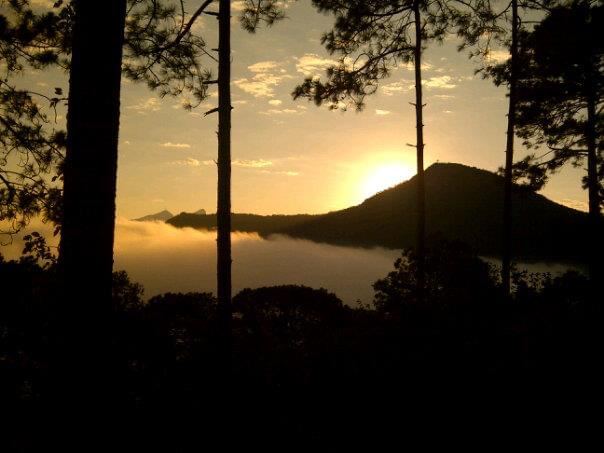
El Pinar seen from Chipinque

== History ==
Though this area's beauty was widely known, it wasn't an Ecological Park until 1992, when a board of trustees made up of the government of the State of Nuevo León and a private initiative was formalized. It was also known as an obligatory destination for most biology and ecology enthusiasts, as the typical northern habitat and biodiversity made it unique.

The mission of this park is to maintain biodiversity in the area, by means of controlling the use of natural resources responsibly. Chipinque is open every day of the year, from 6am to 8pm local time. Most of the park is open to all people, though authorization and a guide are needed to climb some of the higher peaks. The park's staff consists of 22 forest rangers.

== Geography ==
Cerro de Chipinque is in the Sierra Madre Oriental, within the bounds of Cumbres de Monterrey National Park. It has a land area of 1625 hectares though only about 300 of these are open to the general public. With altitudes ranging from 800m to around 2200m above sea level, the tallest peak is known as Copete de las Aguillas, which is Spanish for crest of the eagles. The main crest is about 17 km long.

== Biology and ecology ==
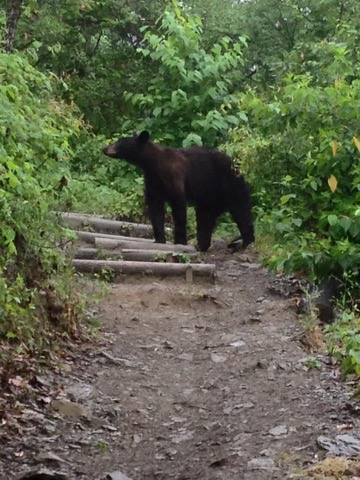
American Black Bear (Ursus americanus) seen in Chipinque.

=== Flora ===
This area is defined mainly by the large coniferous forest. Some of the plants there are Agave americana, A. bracteosa, A. scabra, Asclepias (milkweed) sp., Cercis canadensis (eastern redbud), Cestrum parqui, Cordia boissieri, Echinocereus sp., Euphorbia (spurge) sp., ferns, Garrya elliptica, Havardia (tenaza) sp., Ipomoea (morning glory) sp., Juniperus flaccida (enebro triste), Justicia sp., Lantana sp., Lenophyllum sp., Mammillaria (pincushion) sp., Monarda (bee balm) sp., Nicotiana (tobacco) sp., Opuntia (prickly pear) sp., Pinus pseudostrobus (pino lacio), Prosopis (mesquite) sp., Prunus persica (durazno), Quercus canbyi (encino duraznillo) and other types of oak, Vachellia constricta (chaparro prieto) and Vachellia farnesiana (huizache or sweet acacia).

=== Fauna ===
This area's fauna consists mainly of large mammals and birds. Some of the mammals are Coyotes, Wildcats, Coatis, White tail deer and the grey wolf. Some of the birds are Red-tailed Hawk, Turkey vulture, Wild Turkey, Mountain pygmy owl, Bronzed cowbird and the Blue-capped motmot. Some of the reptiles are spiny lizards, Texas alligator lizards, and Blacktail cribos. The park stands out for its multitude of butterfly species.

=== Climate ===
The average temperature of Chipinque is 20 °C, with an average yearly rain being 860mm. This area is mainly a subhumid temperate forest and submontane scrubland. The forests are mainly pines and oak.
