= El Salto (climbing area) =

Climbing area in Nuevo Leon

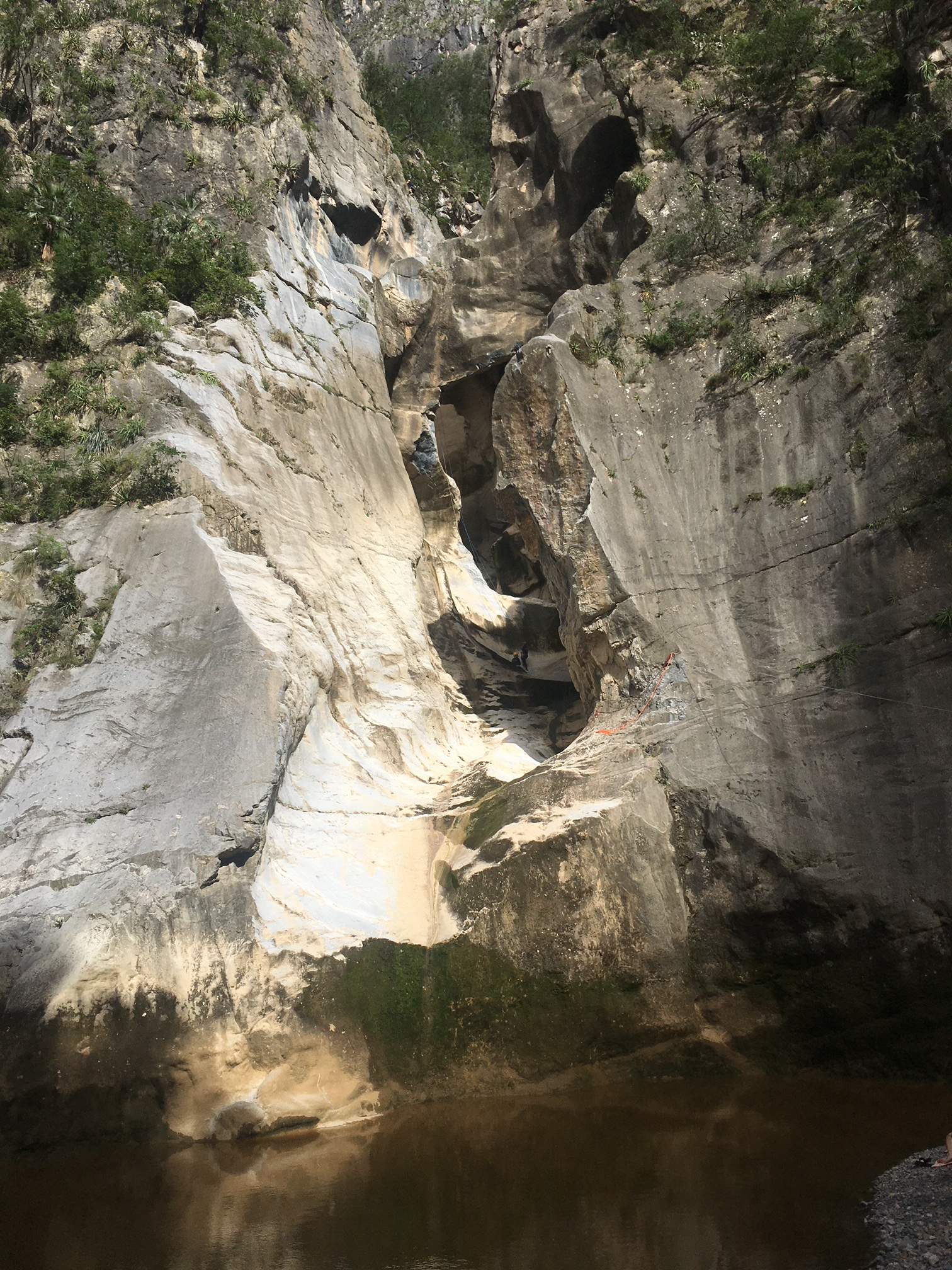
View from the basin of El Salto

El Salto is a rock climbing area in the Nuevo León, Mexico. The climbing area is near to Ciénega de González village, Santiago municipality, 60 km away from Monterrey. El Salto is one of the few climbing areas in northern Mexico where overhanging limestone full of tufa can be found. The Las Animas wall can be reached by foot from the town Cienega de Gonzalez. The name “El Salto” refers to a waterfall near the climbing area.

The average annual temperature is 18°C; the hottest month is June with an average temperature of 24°C, and the coldest is January with 12°C. The average annual rainfall is 911 millimeters; the wettest month is September with an average of 266 mm of precipitation, and the driest is January with 25 mm of precipitation.

== Climbing sections ==
- Las Animas, with grades from 5.11B to 5.13d.
- La Cueva del Tecolote, with Grades from 5.11C to 5.14B.
