= San Pedro Garza García =

- City
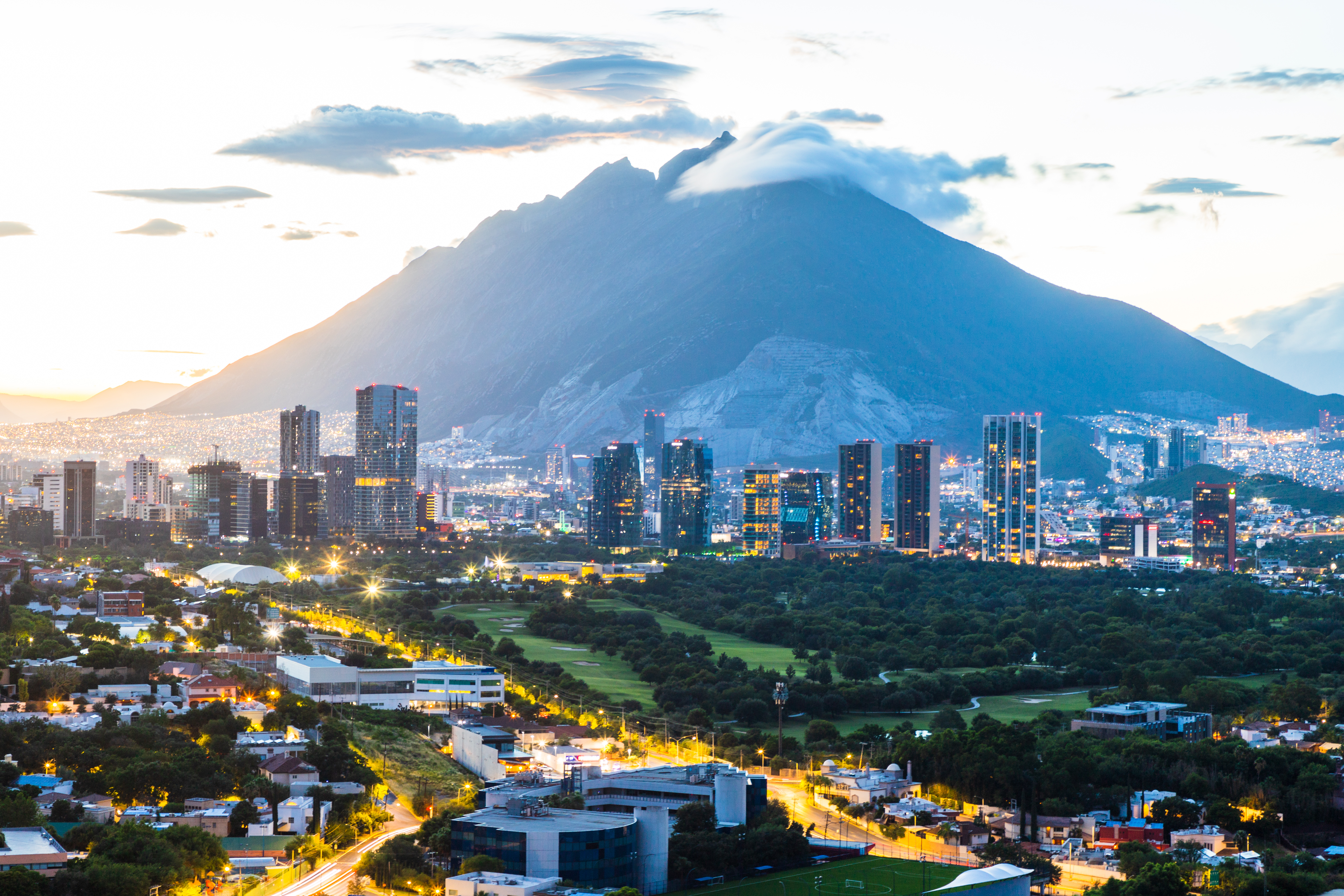
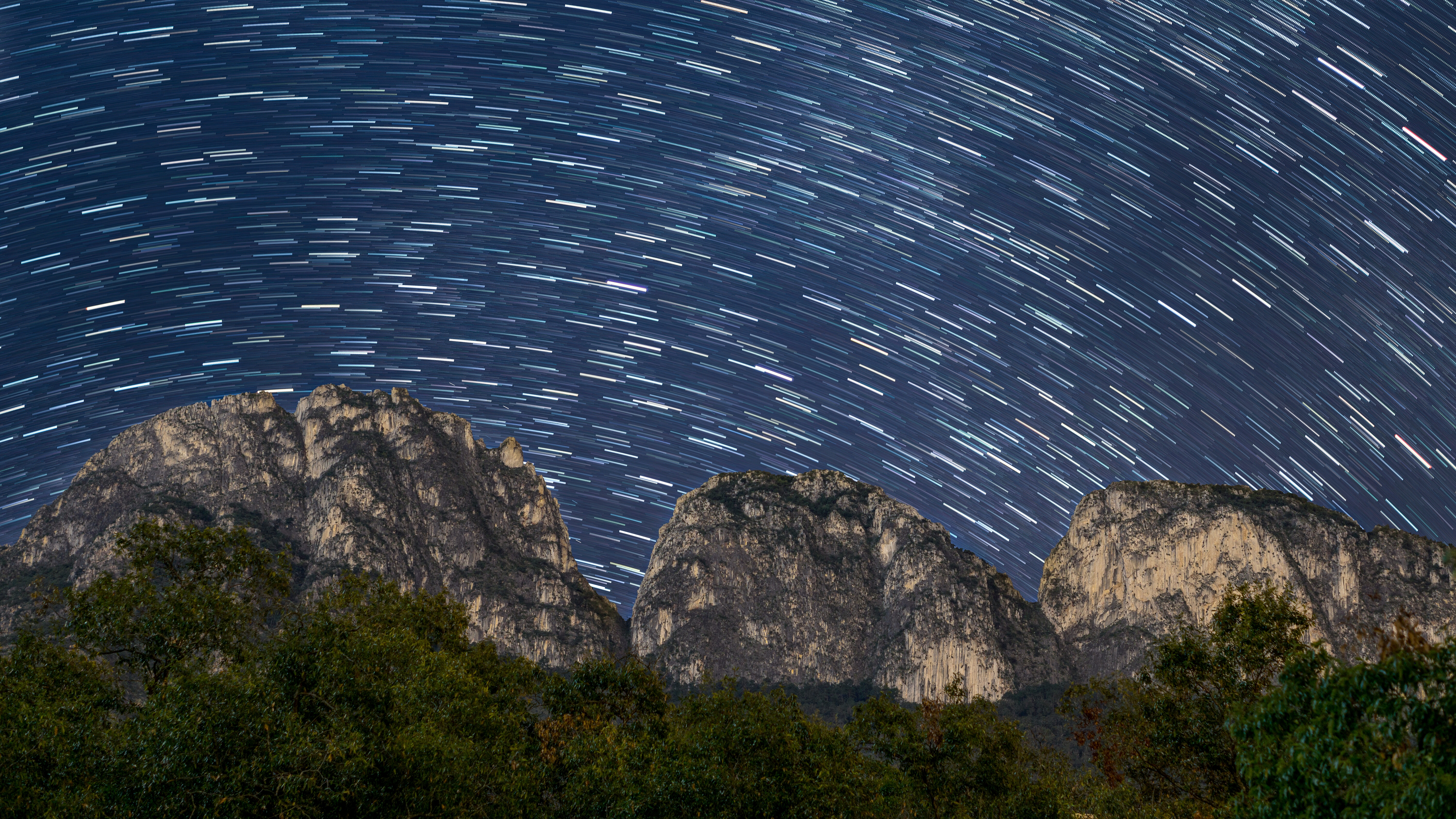
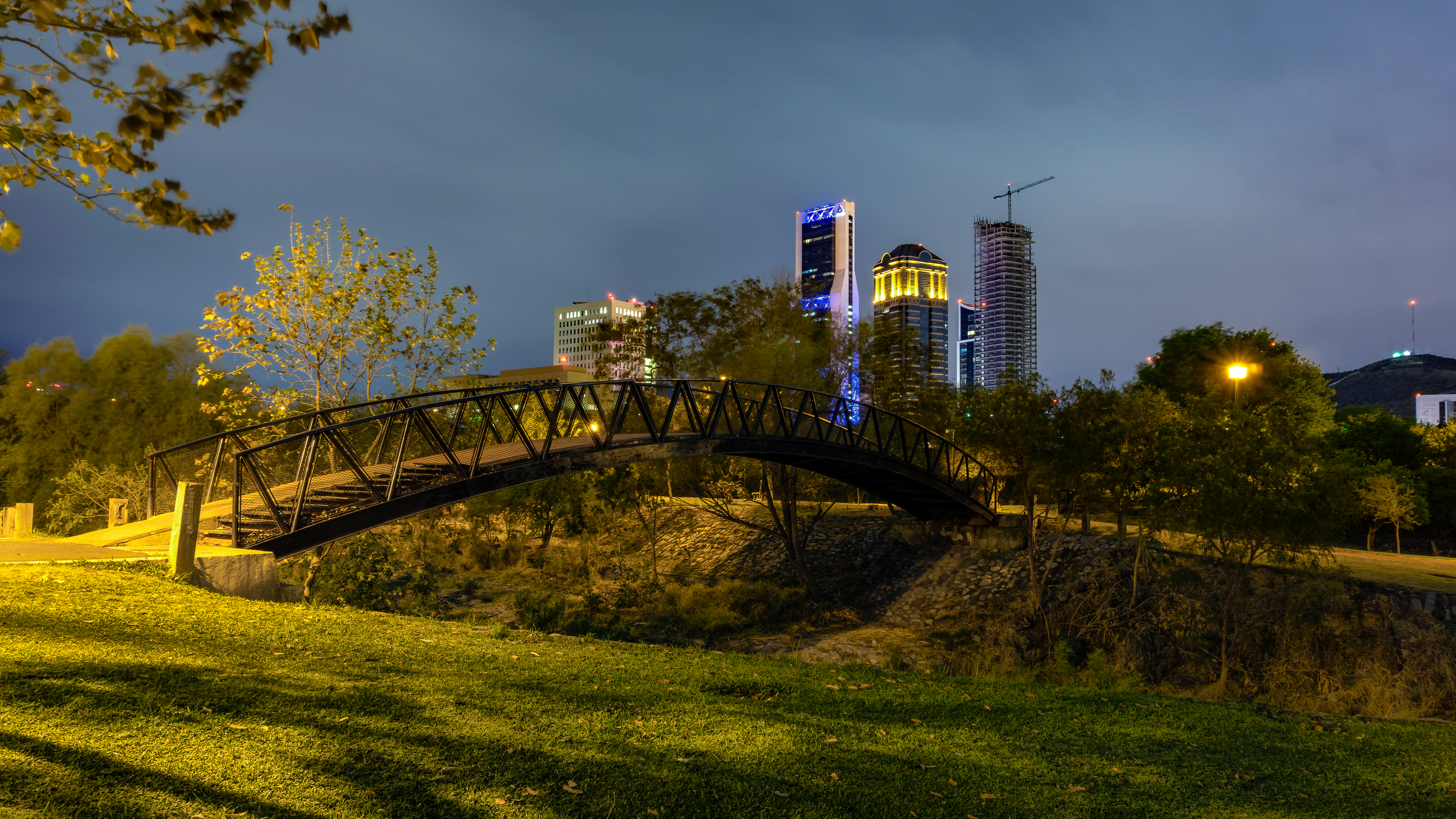
- Monterrey Country Club Cerro de Chipinque Rufino Tamayo Park

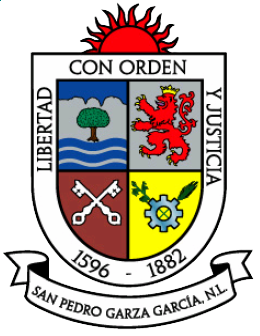
- Coat of arms
- Nicknames: San Pedro, Garza Garcia
- Motto: Libertad con Orden y Justicia (Freedom with Order and Justice)
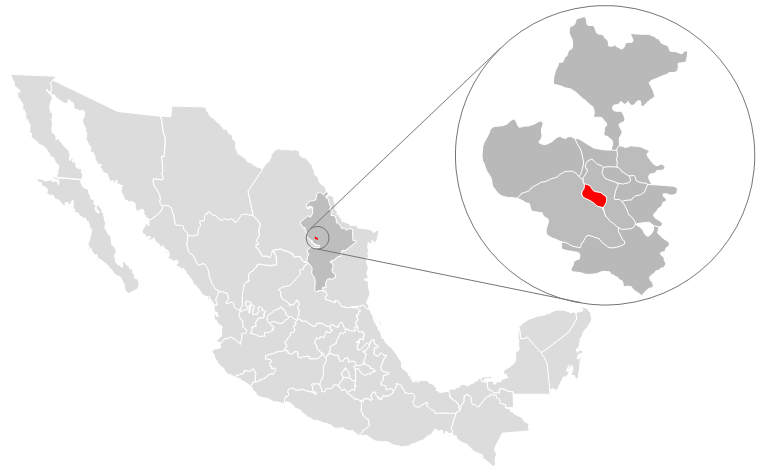
- Location in the Monterrey metropolitan area

- Location within Nuevo León Location within Mexico
- Coordinates: 25°40′N 100°18′W
- Country: Mexico
- State: Nuevo León
- Founded: November 20, 1596
- Named for: Saint Peter and Genaro Garza García

Government
  - Mayor: Mauricio Farah (interim)
  - Federal electoral district: Nuevo León's 1st

Area
  - City: 47.46 km^{2} (18.32 sq mi)
- Elevation: 540 m (1,770 ft)

Population (2020 census)
  - City: 132,128
  - Density: 2,784/km^{2} (7,210/sq mi)
  - Metro: 5,341,177
  - Metro density: 697.5/km^{2} (1,807/sq mi)
- Time zone: UTC-6 (Zona Centro)
- Postal code: 66230
- Website: www.sanpedro.gob.mx

San Pedro Garza García (also known simply as San Pedro) is a city in Mexico. It is part of the Monterrey Metropolitan area of Nuevo León. It is a contemporary commercial suburb of the larger metropolitan city of Monterrey. San Pedro is considered the richest city in Mexico and Latin America. It has luxury shopping malls, and large green areas, as well as important colleges and hospitals. Cerro de Chipinque and Chipinque Ecological Park are notable aspects of the city. The city hosts the head offices of companies such as ALFA, Cemex, Gamesa, Vitro, Pyosa, Softtek and Cydsa.

== History ==
The city that became San Pedro Garza García was founded in 1596 by Diego de Montemayor as the Hacienda de San Pedro de los Nogales. The land was granted by de Montemayor to his son, "El Mozo" de Montemayor, along with other settlers, as an agricultural settlement. The area remained a sedate agricultural settlement until the late 1800s, when it was elevated to villa status, and named Garza García in honor of Genaro Garza García, then-governor of Nuevo León.

The village remained a small, agricultural community until the 1940s, when Alberto Santos González began the first urbanization efforts. He purchased and began to build Colonia del Valle, the first residential subdivision in Nuevo León. The town's population quickly grew, going from 5,338 inhabitants in 1950 to 14,943 in 1960 and 45,983 by 1970 as the city grew.

== Geography ==
The municipality has an area of 70.78 km^{2} (27.33 sq mi) and is primarily urban, located adjacent to the southwest side of Monterrey. It sits in a valley surrounded by mountains, most notably La Loma Larga and Sierra Madre Oriental.

=== Chipinque Ecological Park ===
On the slopes of Cerro de Chipinque, within the Cumbres de Monterrey national park, is the Chipinque Ecological Park, with 1,791 hectares, covering altitudes from 730 to 2,200 meters with representative flora and fauna. The annual average temperature is 21 °C.

The Chipinque Ecological Park aims to conserve biodiversity through integrated management that ensures the conservation of its natural resources, which in turn promotes respect and appreciation of the ecosystem and geography of the place.

On the 25th anniversary of the park, the Chipinque brand was redesigned, which revitalized the relationship that visitors have with the park.

== Government ==
In 2006, the municipal president (mayor) of San Pedro was Mauricio Fernández of the PAN (National Action Party).

San Pedro Garza García was founded in 1596. The land was converted into a large plantation called "Los Nogales" which produced crops like corn, wheat, and beans.

During the 18th century, the plantation often went by the name of "San Pedro", in honor of Saint Peter.

The city was elevated to the status of "villa" (town) on December 14, 1882, when it was given the name Garza García, in honor of the governor of Nuevo León, Genaro Garza García.

In 1988, the mayor at the time, Alejandro Chapa Salazar, gave the city its current name, adding the reference to what it was called centuries before.

== Education ==
=== Higher education ===
The city is home to the Catholic university, Universidad de Monterrey (UDEM), which offers bachelor's degree and master's degree programs. The Instituto Tecnológico de Estudios Superiores de Monterrey (ITESM) has two of its graduate schools in San Pedro. The Escuela de Graduados en Administración y Dirección de Empresas (EGADE), ITESM's Graduate School of Business, and the Escuela de Graduados en Administración y Política Pública (EGAP), the Graduate School of Politics and Public Administration. Both campuses are located in Valle Oriente. There are no public universities in San Pedro.

=== Elementary and secondary education ===
San Pedro has 40 public pre-schools, elementary schools, middle schools, and high schools. The city also has 39 private schools. However, whereas public schools only offer one type of education (e.g., only middle school, or only elementary school), private schools offer multiple types (mostly K-9 and K-12). If counted individually by type of education provided, private schools function as 88 different schools, more than twice the number of public schools.

== Notable people ==
- Maria L. de Hernández (1896–1986), Mexican-American rights activist, born in San Pedro Garza García
- Alejandro Junco de la Vega, journalist and founder of Reforma
- DD Fuego, drag queen
- José Antonio Fernández Carbajal, businessman
- Mauricio Fernández Garza, politician and businessman
- Lázaro Garza Ayala, military officer, lawyer, politician, governor of Nuevo León; known for writing the phrase "Las armas nacionales se han cubierto de gloria" (The national arms have been covered in glory).
- Alejandra Villarreal, bassist, singer and songwriter of The Warning
- Daniela Villarreal, lead singer, guitarist and songwriter of The Warning
- Paulina Villarreal, drummer, singer and lead songwriter of The Warning
- Lorenzo Zambrano, businessman and philanthropist

== Sister city ==
San Pedro Garza García has one sister city:

- (United States) - Plano, Texas, US

== See also ==
- San Pedro Garza García stage collapse
