= La Huasteca (climbing area) =

Municipal park in Monterrey, Mexico

Coordinates: 25°36′53.74″N 100°27′48.70″W

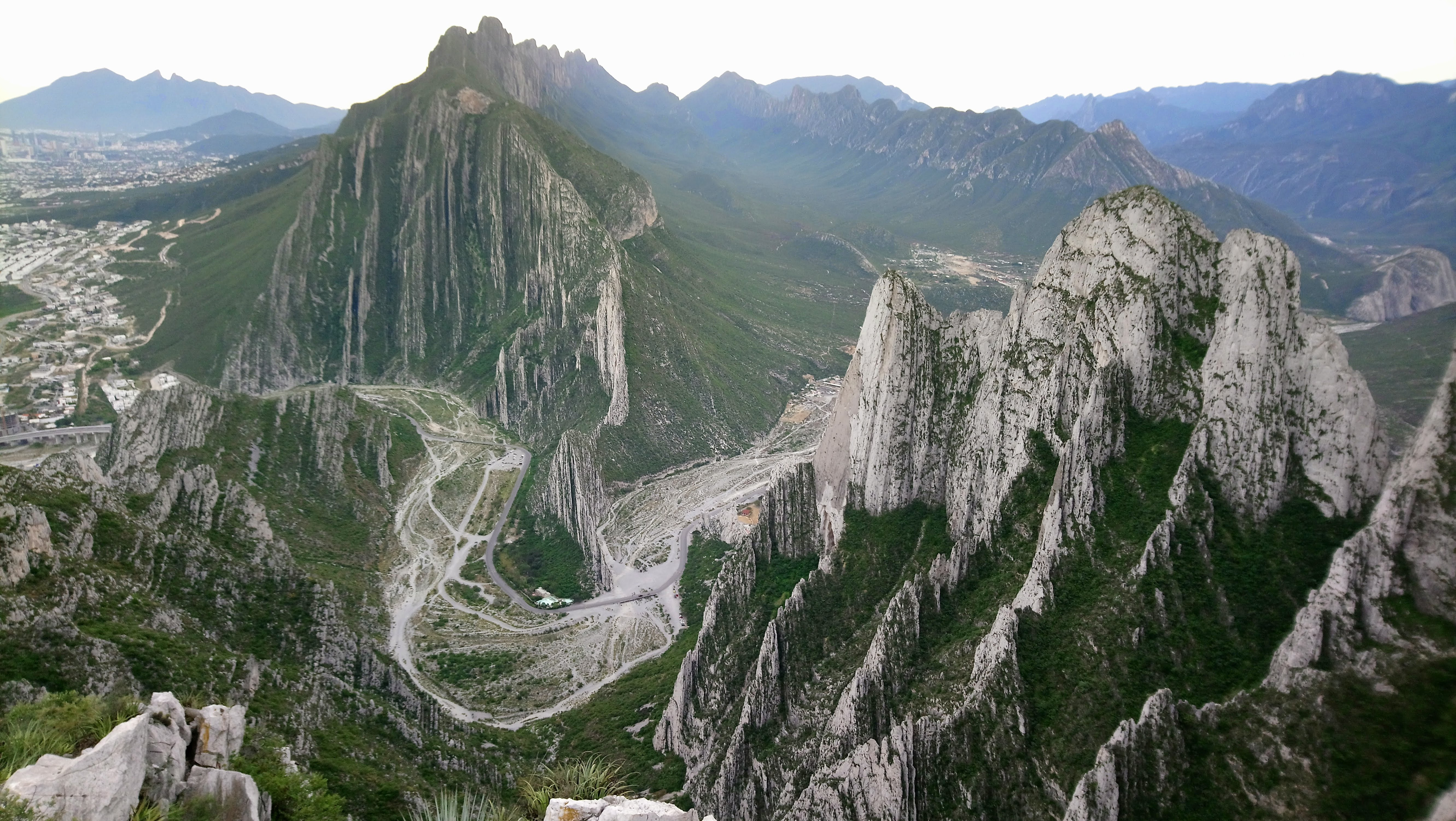
Santa Catarina River

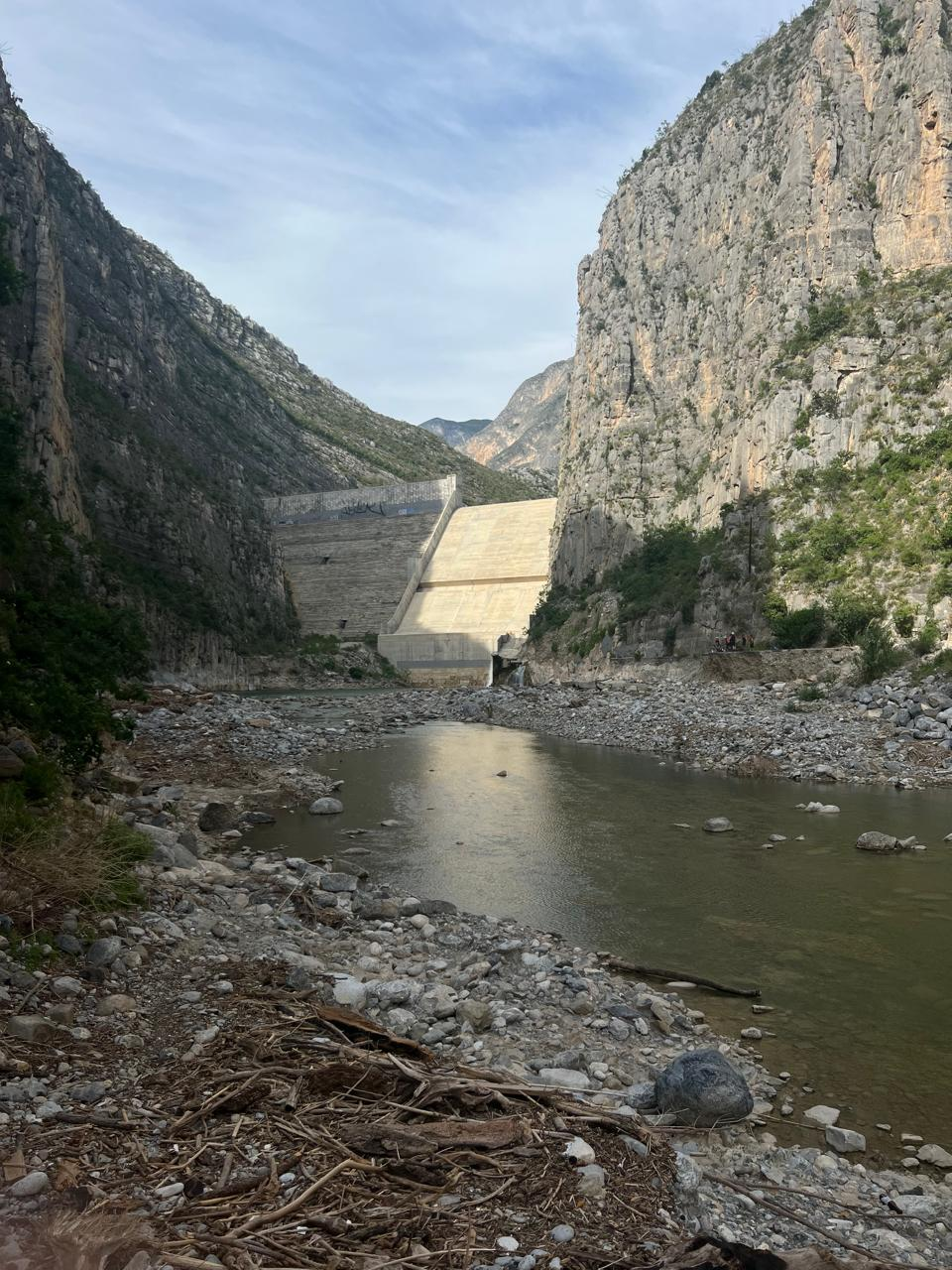
Presa Rompepicos

Parque La Huasteca is a municipal park in Monterrey, Mexico. It is part of Cumbres de Monterrey National Park, which was established by president Lázaro Cárdenas in November 1939 and declared a UNESCO Biosphere Reserve in October 2006. It is part of the Sierra Madre Oriental mountain range, and its part of the Huasteca Region, from where it derives its name. It is a natural canyon formed by the Santa Catarina River. It is around 200 hectares in area. It also has the highest precipitation of the state, Nuevo Leon, and is home to La Presa Rompepicos. The canyon is mostly conformed of limestone, reaching heights of over 550 meters. This limestone comes from the Late Jurassic, nearly 161 million years ago. Though the formation of the mountain itself was during the Laramide orogeny, around 40 to 20 million years ago. Having nearly 400 bolted routes with grades from 5.4 to 5.14, and no entrance fee for most climbing areas, it has become a very popular site for climbers.

== History ==
In 1939, Cumbres de Monterrey National Park was established by president Lázaro Cárdenas.

In 1954 Federico Ramírez García, also known as "Lico", climbed the first summit of La Huasteca. Today that summit is known as "Pico Lico" in his honor. Pico Lico is nearly 70 meters high.

In 1957 the most famous peak in La Huasteca was conquered by a climbing club called Pirineos, hence the autonomous name of the peaks "Los Pirineos".

In 1960 the West Face was first climbed: Alberto Perez from Pirineos climbed almost all the route except the last 60 meters, then a couple of friends threw him a rope from above to complete the climb. The first person to climb the West Face without any assistance was Juan de Dios De Leon Camero. Others followed, conquering more summits and bolting some routes.

It the late 1980s and 1990s, sport climbing began with Francisco Medina, and Andres Medina, two brothers and students of the Juan de Dios climbing school. They bolted and climbed the hardest routes in La Huasteca, Veneno and El Sueño que de Niño, both 5.13c.

In the 2000s climbing became more popular, when the Universidad de Monterrey and the ITESM, two well-recognized universities, started giving climbing courses at La Huasteca.

In 2005, the first guidebook was written by Ramón Narváez, a local climber. The area appears in the larger English-Spanish Guía de Escalada en México (Zona Norte), using the exact drawings and contents of the original Huasteca guidebook without permission from the author.

In 2006, Cumbres de Monterrey National Park was declared a UNESCO Biosphere Reserve.

By 2010 UDEM suspend the climbing courses because of Mexico's recession and the increase in violence in the city during the ongoing War on Drugs.

During Hurricane Alex, La Huasteca was severely impacted, damaging several routes and also lowering the level of the ground by down to 1 meter, making the beginning of some routes unclimbable.

In 2014, at-risk youth program Escalando Fronteras joined forces with volunteers to further develop the park for visitors and eco-tourism. The same year, British climber Gareth "Gaz" Leah completed the direct line to Huastecas famous Pico Independencia, named "The Life You Can Save" 5.12+ 350m. The route name was donated by Alex Honnold who took part in the Escalando Fronteras Kickstarter campaign.

In 2016, Gareth "Gaz" Leah released a new guidebook to Parque La Huasteca on a digital platform known as RAKKUP covering many new areas not covered in previous guides. The print release is due in the next month.

== Ecology ==
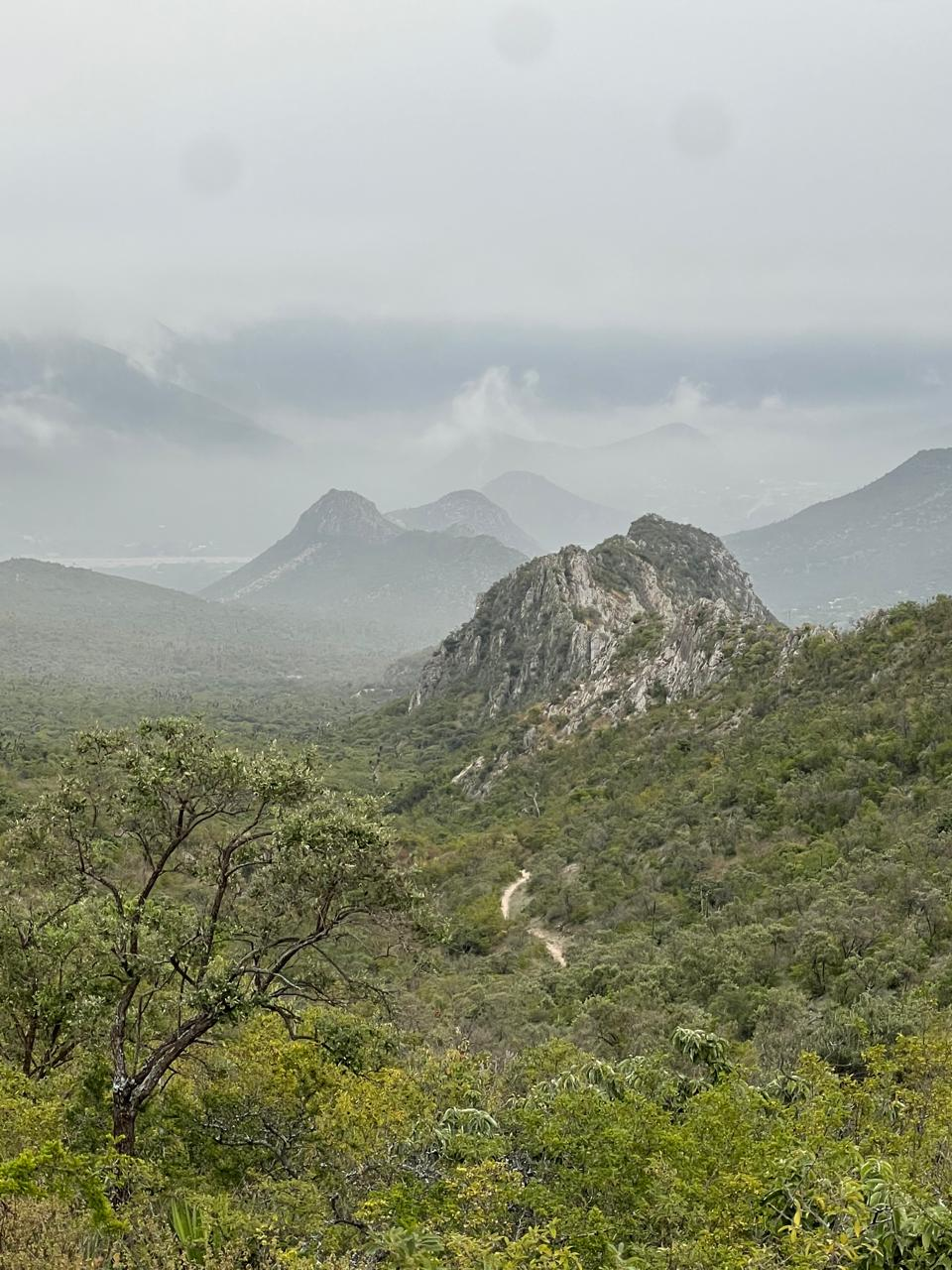
La Huasteca from a cycling path

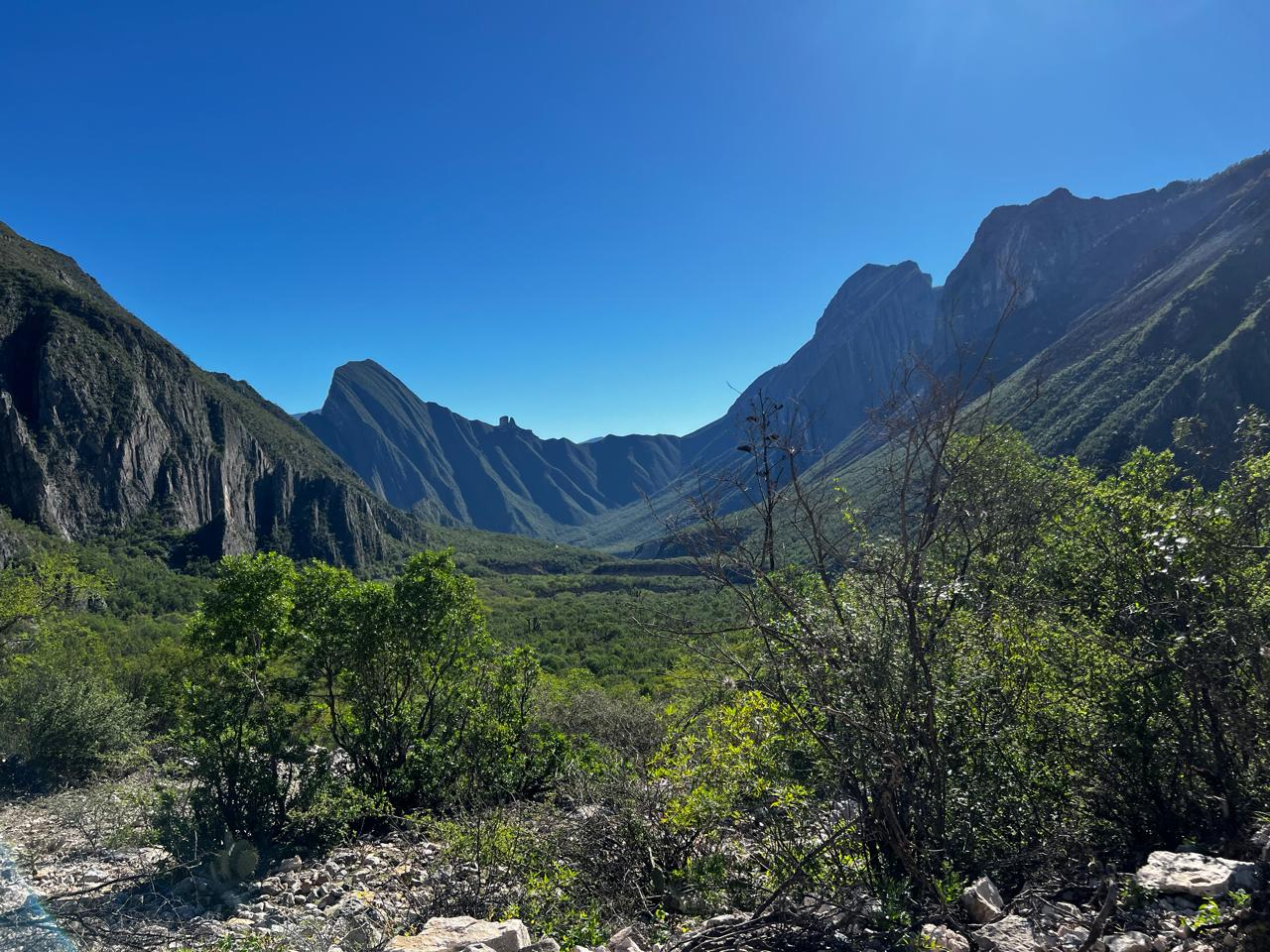
La Huasteca, path to El Pajonal

Thanks to the wide ranging topography of La Huasteca, there are temperate zones, mainly being conformed of pine and oak forests; Semi-arid zones, conformed of mainly scrubland; and arid zones, mainly composed of cacti and agave. Nearly 2.5% of the 1300 species found in La Huasteca are endemic to the state of Nuevo Leon.

== Environmental issues ==
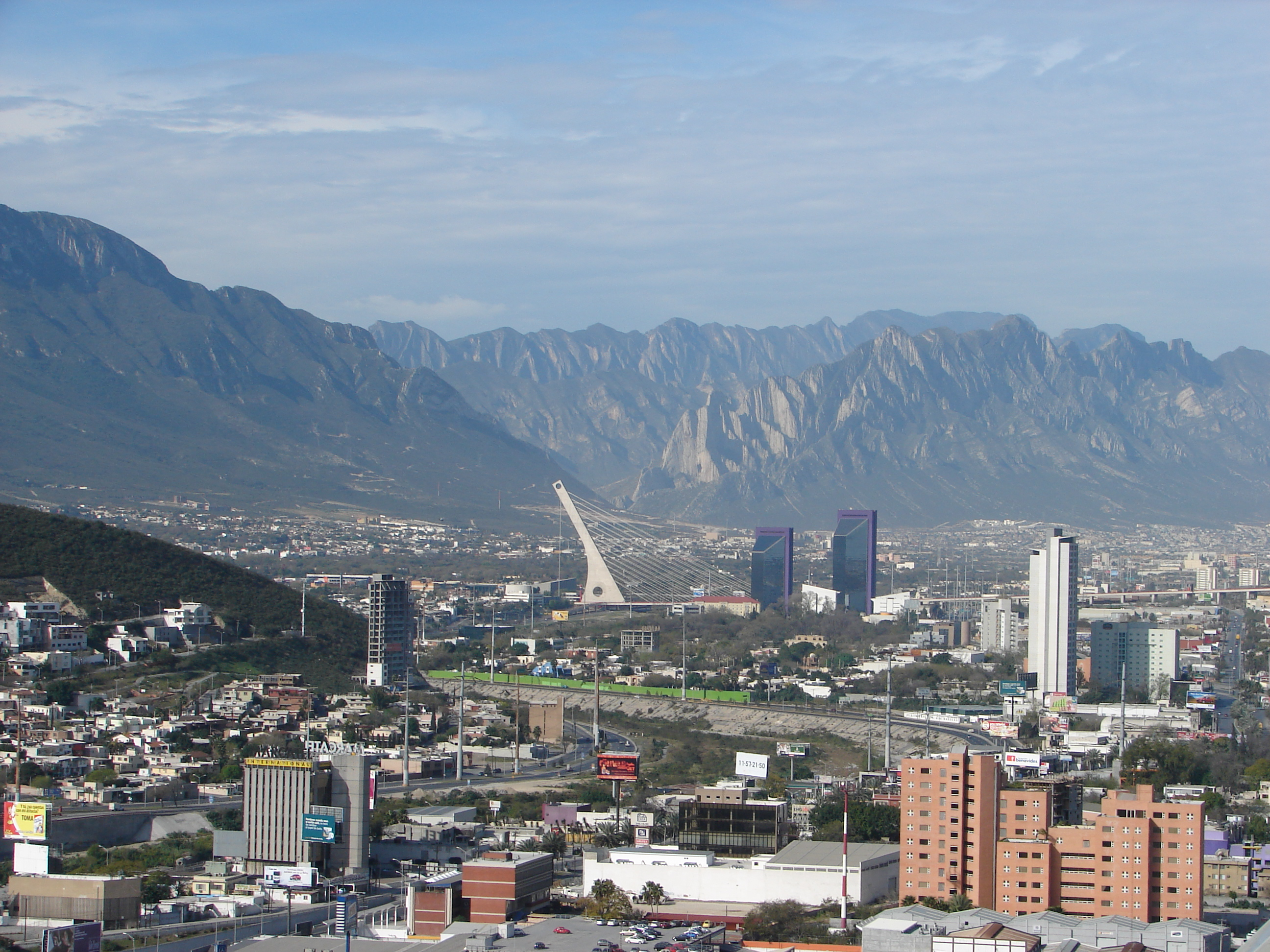
La Huasteca seen from Monterrey, on the background, behind the Puente Atirantado

Since the 1990s, La Huasteca has become a popular weekend destination for families. People number in the hundreds every day, and more in the rare occasions when the river is swollen from heavy rains. Because of the large number of visitors, La Huasteca is suffering from a greater amount of litter.

During 2004 the government tried to solve this problem by charging families 10 pesos to enter some parts of the park, while leaving the climbing areas free to enter. This has not been successful, as families simply stopped entering the paid-access areas and instead went to the free climbing areas, especially "Navajas" and "Cazuelas".

From late 2004 to late 2005 a new campaign called "Limpiemos la Huasteca" was conducted, with the objective of cleaning all the garbage from La Huasteca. Private and public schools, members of the climbing community, members of the cycling community, and anyone else wanting to help were encouraged to clean up this area. To aid in the removal of garbage, the government supplied trucks to transport waste.

Although La Huasteca was improved, much work remained to be done, as the waste was being generated faster than it was being removed.

All visitors to la Huasteca are encouraged to bring a bag and remove some waste.

== Recent deaths ==
In recent years la Huasteca has seen an increase in accidents involving climbers and campers. Local authorities had associated this with the opening of a Via Ferrata route; this controversial route was built over an old classic route El Infierno y las Espinas, rendering the old route useless as most of the new people climbing the route use the Ferrata and don't have the necessary climbing experience.

This route has seen the death of at least one person acting as a guide when he did not have the credentials required, and the rescue of another overweight excursionist who couldn't continue and got stuck in the middle of a Tyrolean traverse of 100 metres.

Additionally, the mysterious death of two climbers occurred when they fell while rappelling from a multi-pitch route. A non-climbing-related death of a camper occurred by gunfire during a robbery attempt, and another person drowned in the river under the influence of alcohol.

The climbing community is planning to address the recent deaths by reviewing the credentials of those who act as climbing guides and teachers.

== Climbing Areas ==
Cazuelas: Near the entrance, to the left, near an iron door. Harder moderate climbs.

Pico Lico: Past Cazuelas, a triangular rock. Easy climbs.

Los Perros: On the right, just past the entrance. Very easy climbs.

Lulu: Past Los Perros, to the left and below. Easy climbs.

Pico Independencia: The park to the right of the road features a via ferrata leading to the summit, along with moderate to difficult sport, traditional, and mixed climbing routes.

Las Hienas: To the right of Pico Independencia. Difficult climbs.

Zona Extrema: A mile into the canyon, on the left. Easy to harder moderate climbs.

Los Médicos: Past the small village of Nogales. Most popular sport and multi-pitch walls.

Casa del Doctor: Below and to the right of a house built into the stone.

La Marta: Follow the same wall to the right of the routes below Casa del Doctor.

La Bestia Cueva: A very large cave on the hillside at the rear of the canyon.

Virgincita: The smaller cave to the right of Cueva de Virgin on Independencia.

== See also ==
- Potrero Chico
- El Salto
