= Palacio de Gobierno (Nuevo León) =

State government building in Monterrey, Mexico

Coordinates: 25°40′21.50″N 100°18′33.29″W

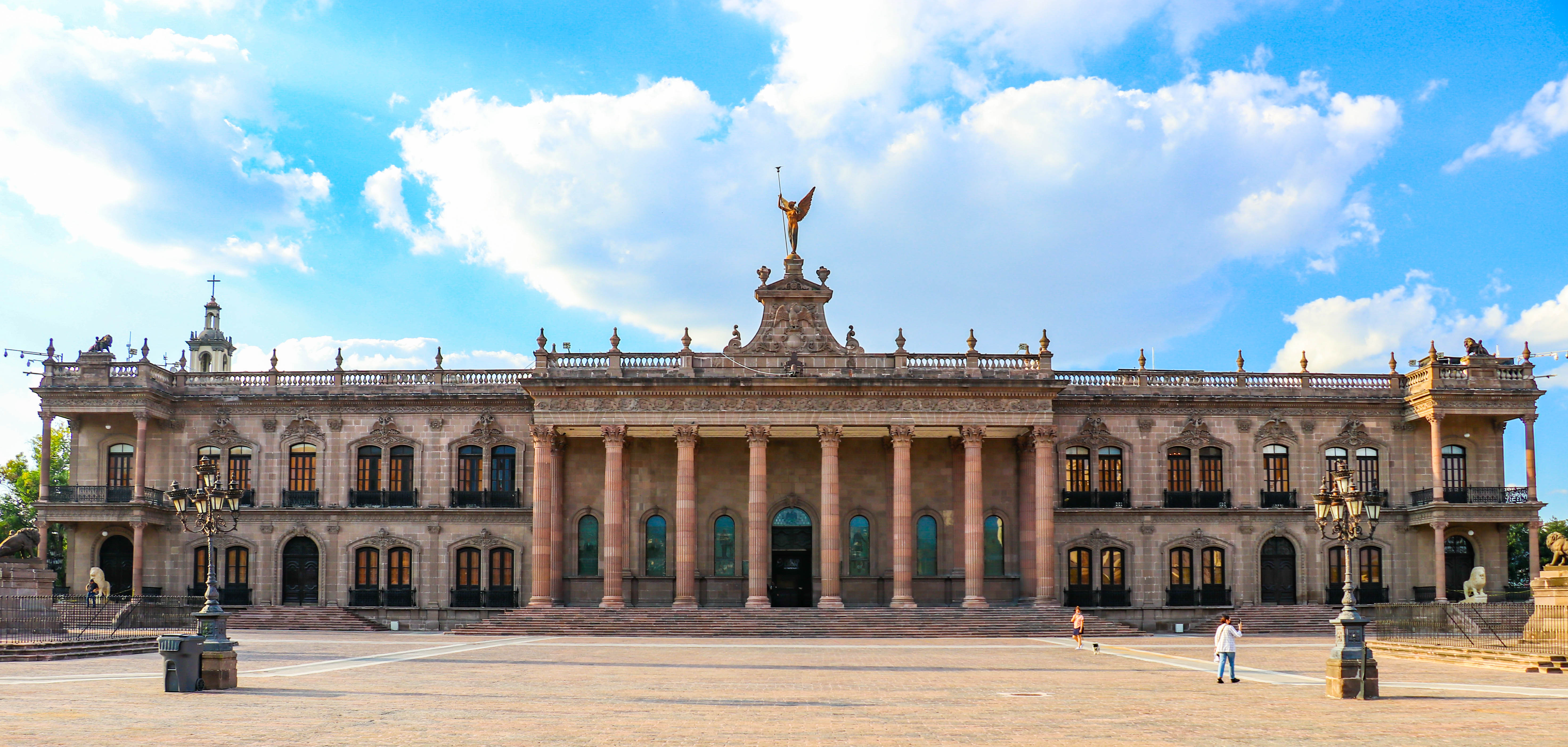
Palacio de Gobierno facade

The Palacio de Gobierno, or the Government Palace of Nuevo León, is a state government building in Monterrey, the capital city of Nuevo León state, in northern Mexico.

The Neoclassical style building is located in the northernmost section of the Macroplaza in the city.

The Palacio de Gobierno is the location of the office of the Governor of Nuevo León.

== See also ==
- Landmarks in Monterrey
