= Monterrey =

- City
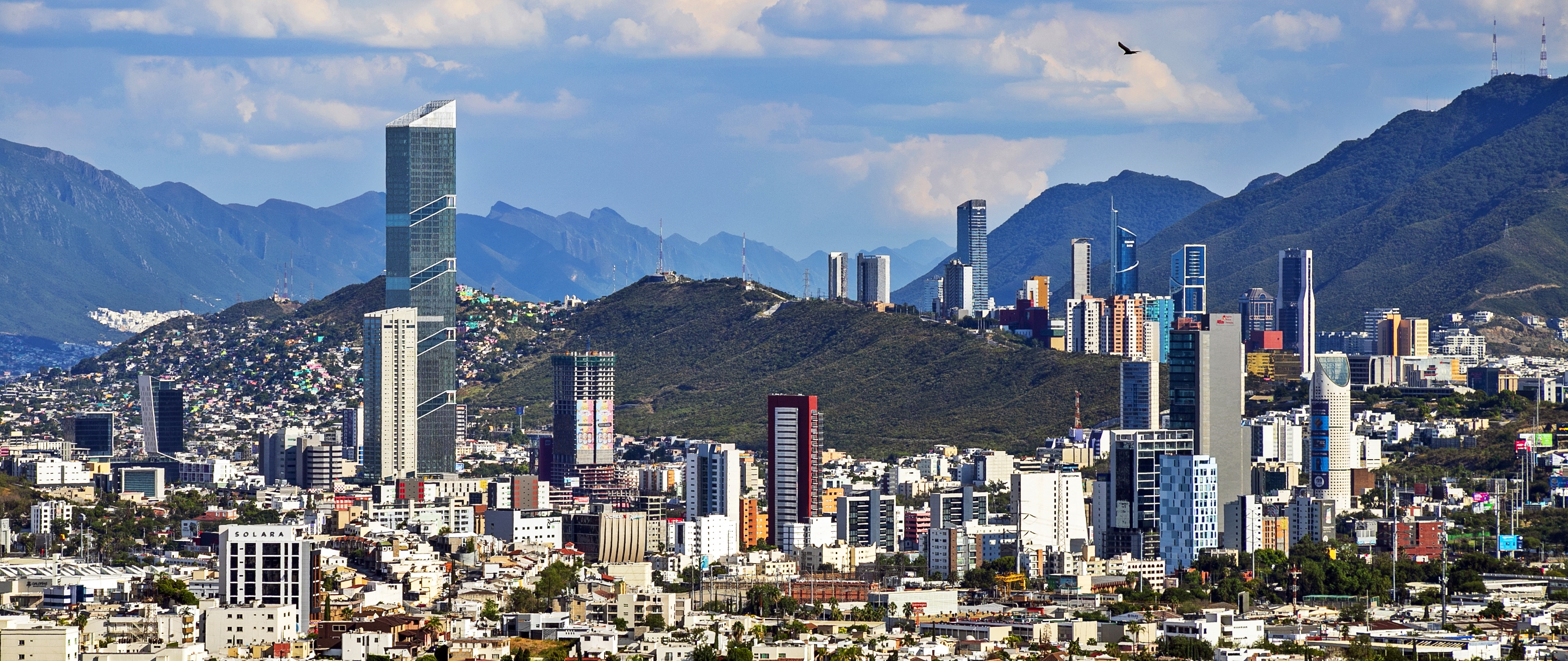
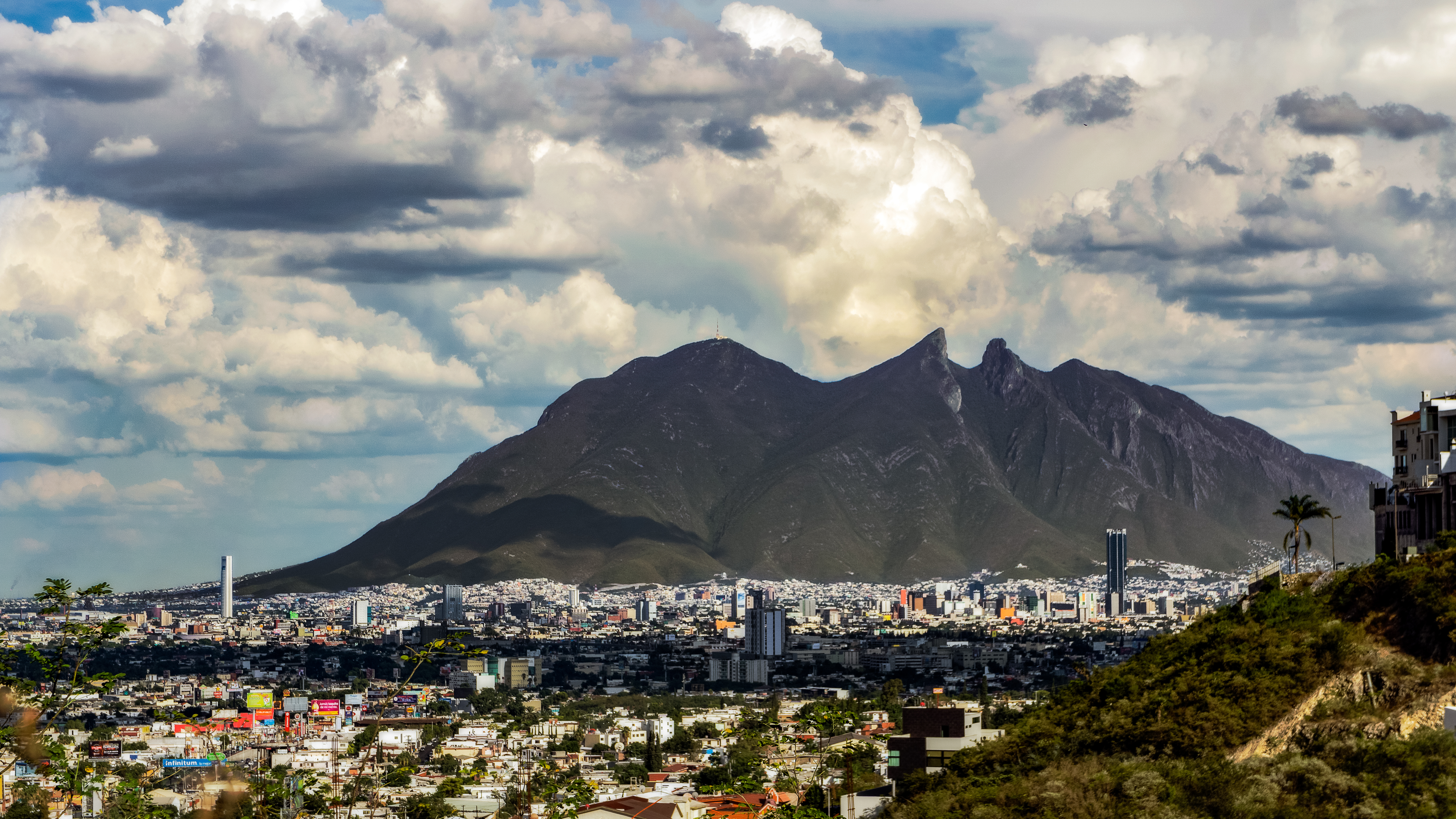
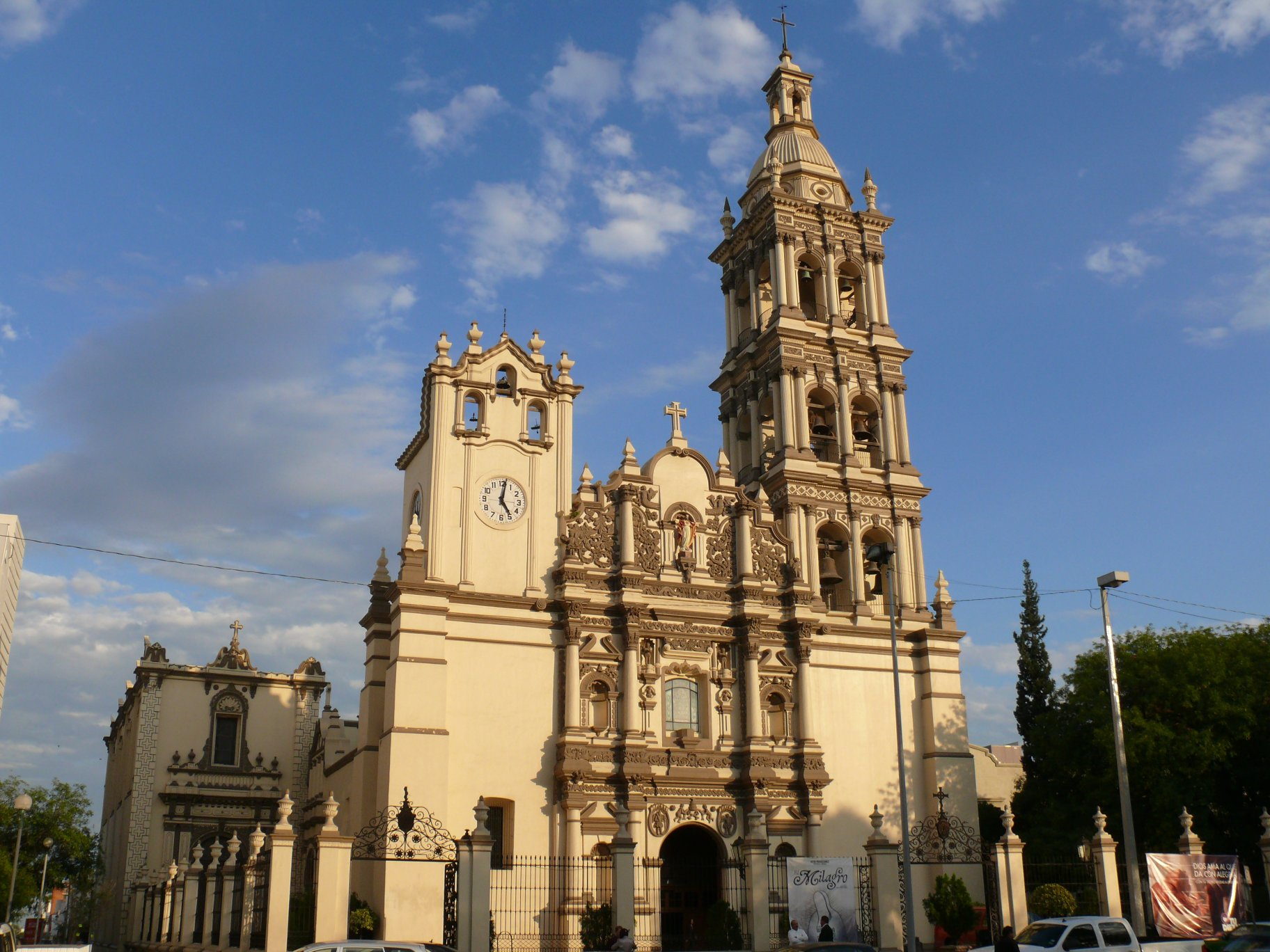
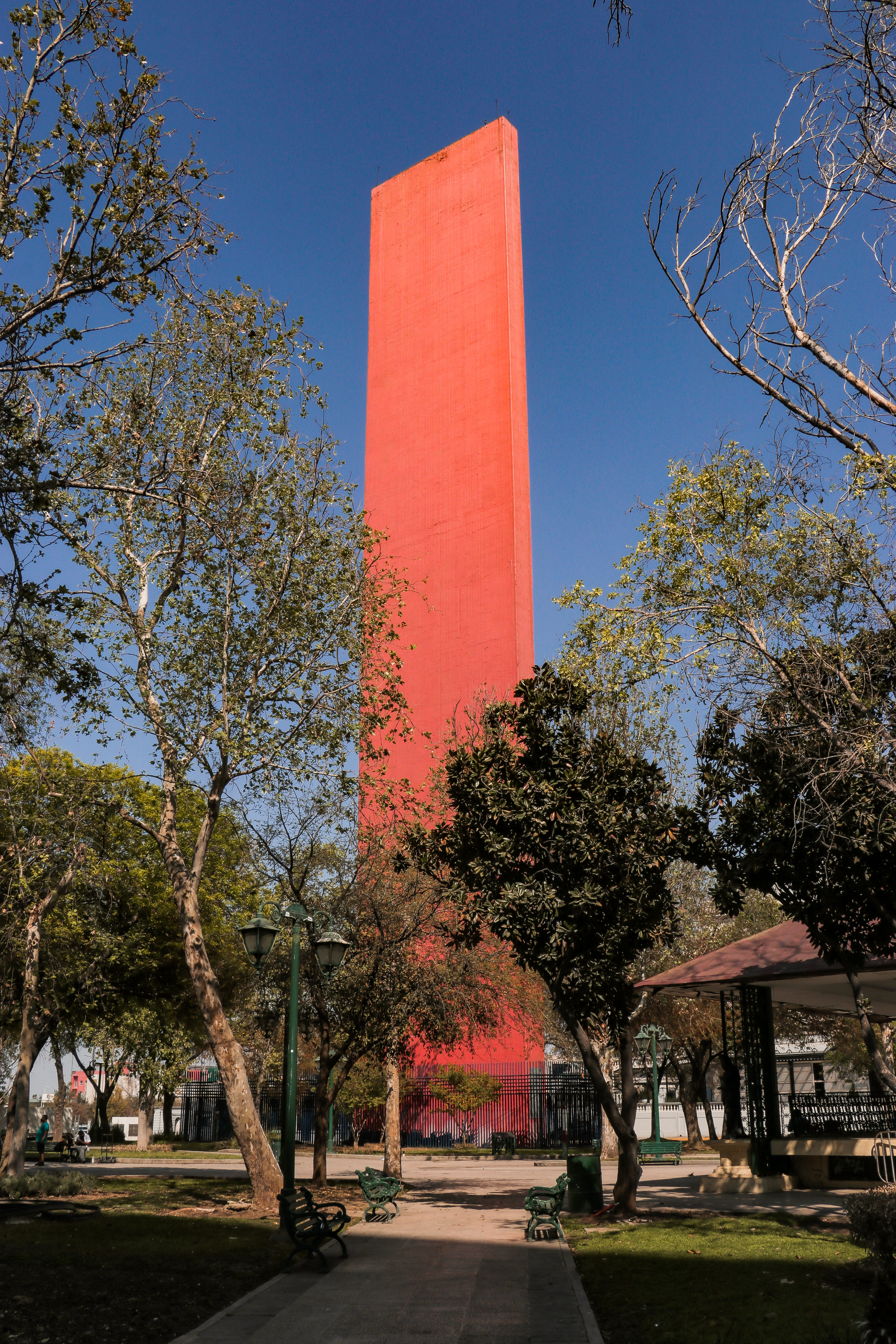
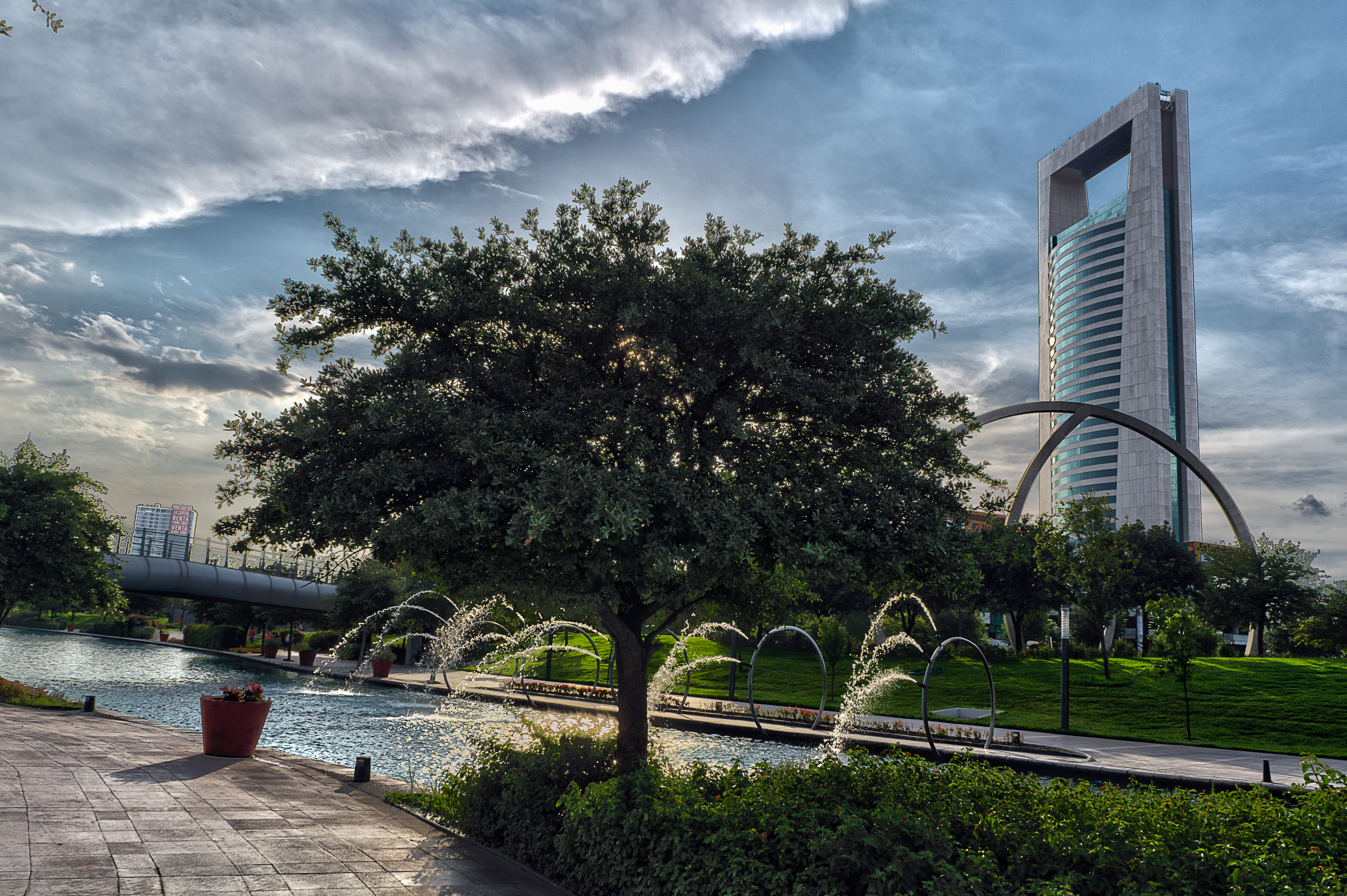
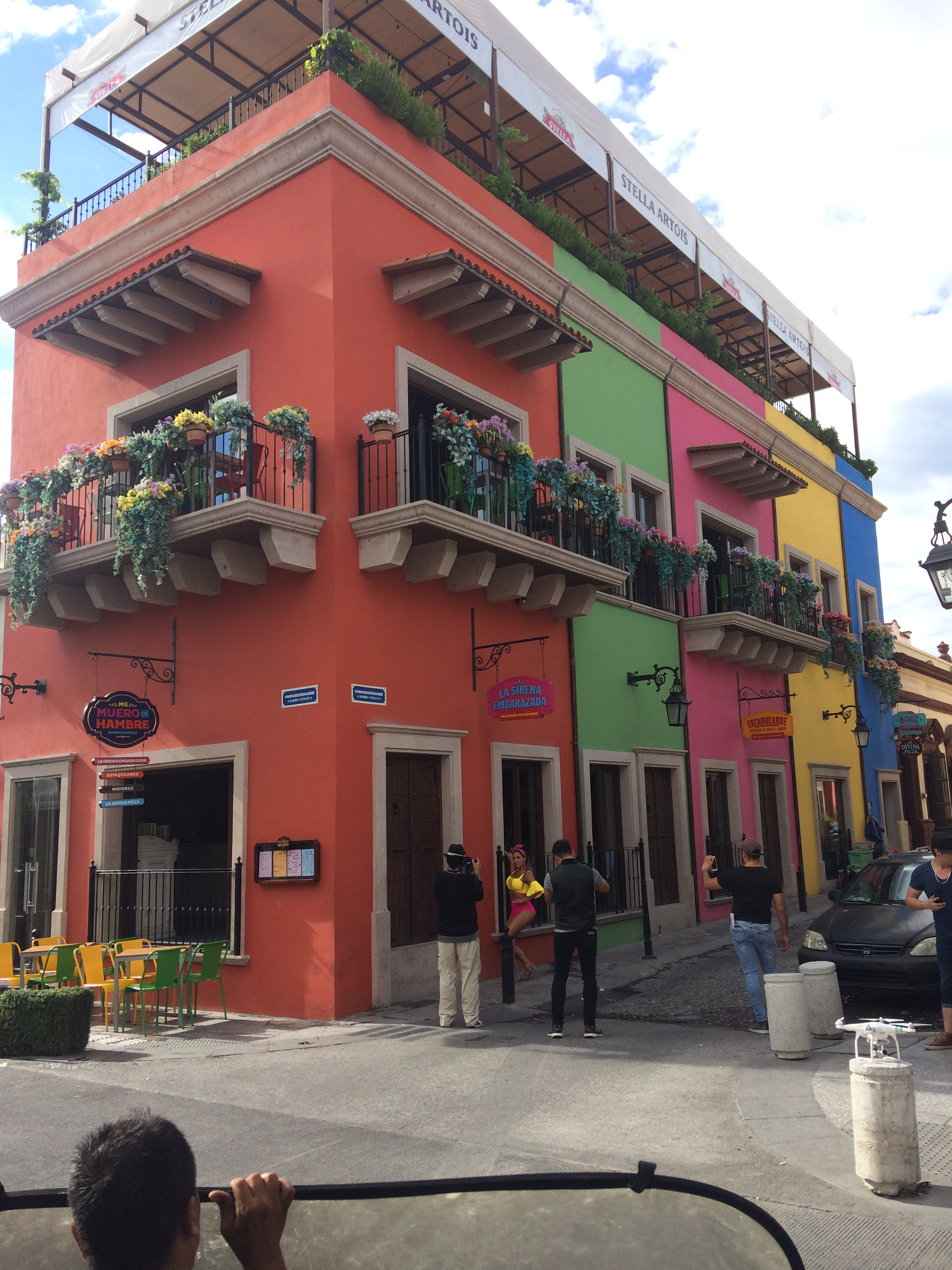
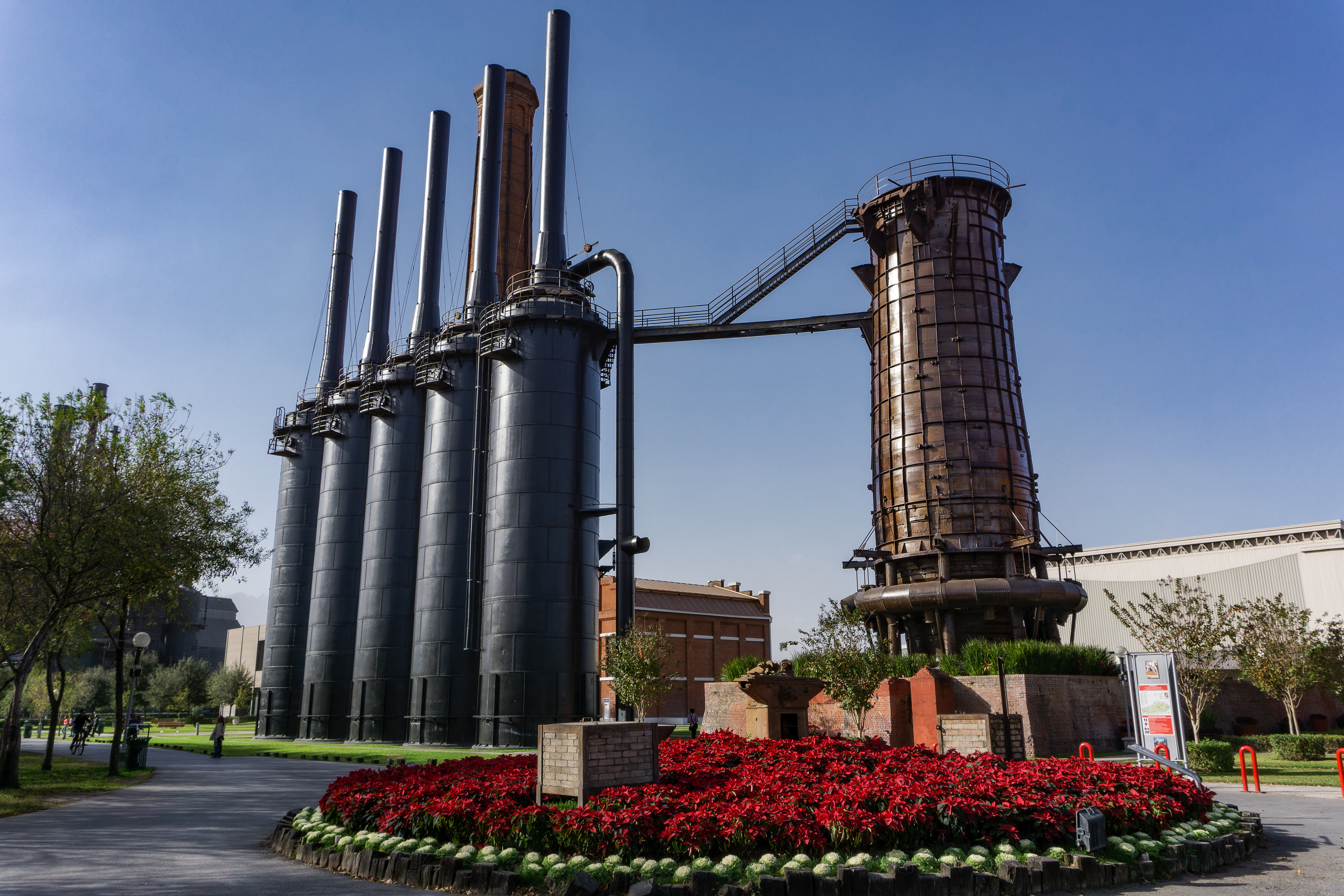
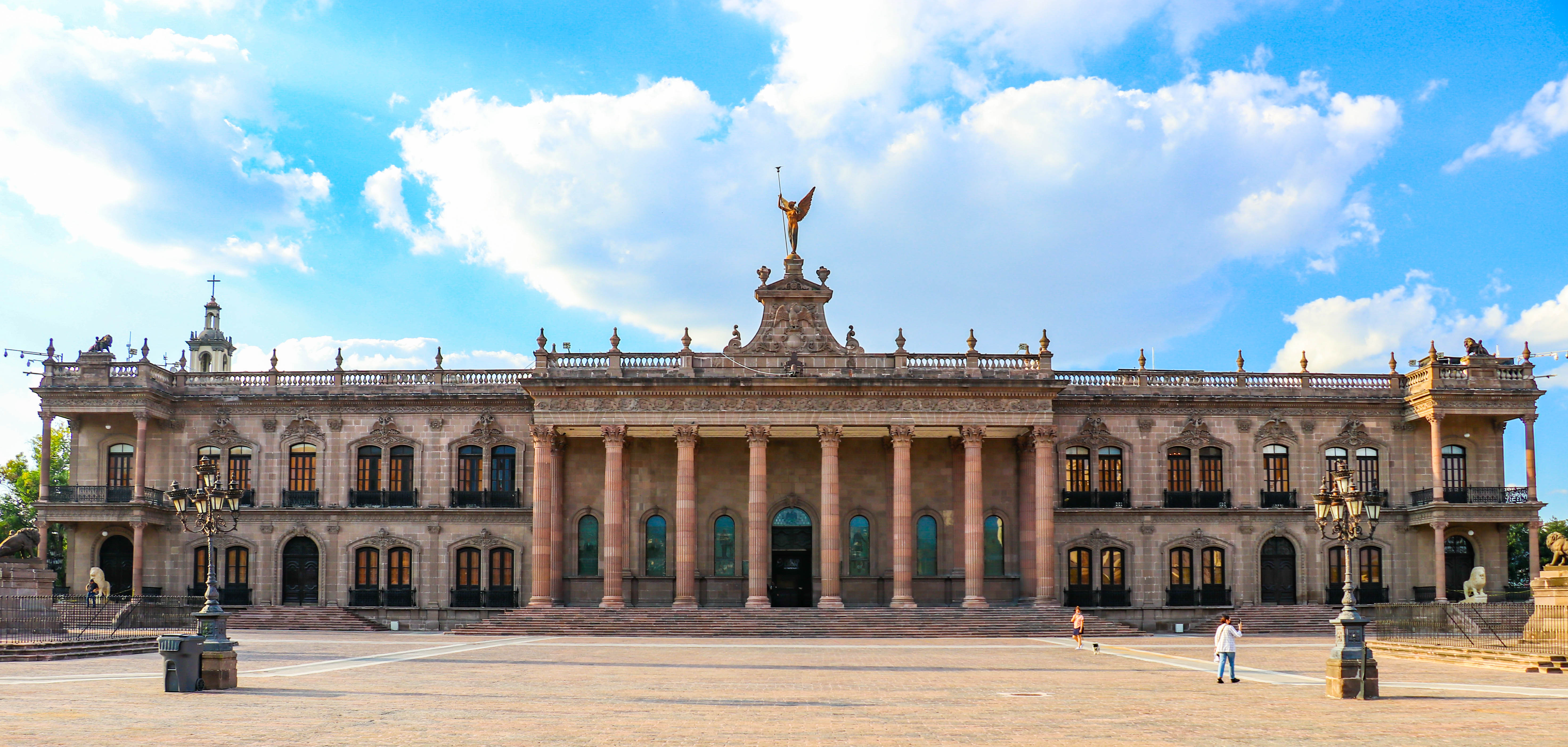
- South-central skyline of Monterrey Cerro de la Silla Monterrey Cathedral Faro del Comercio Paseo Santa Lucía and the Torre Ciudadana Barrio Antiguo Steel Museum in Fundidora Park Government Palace of Nuevo León

- Coat of arms
- Nicknames: Sultan of the North, City of the Mountains, Mexican Industrial Capital
- Motto(s): El trabajo templa el espíritu (Work Tempers the Spirit)
- Location within Nuevo León Location within Mexico Location within North America
- Coordinates: 25°41′04″N 100°19′05″W
- Country: Mexico
- State: Nuevo León
- Municipality: Monterrey
- Founded: September 20, 1596
- Founded as: Ciudad Metropolitana de Nuestra Señora de Monterrey (English translation: Metropolitan city of Our Lady of Monterrey)
- Founder: Diego de Montemayor
- Named for: Gaspar de Zúñiga, 5th Count of Monterrey

Government
  - Mayor: Adrián de la Garza Santos
  - Federal electoral district: NL-5, NL-6, NL-10

Area
  - City: 324.8 km^{2} (125.4 sq mi)
  - Urban: 958 km^{2} (370 sq mi)
  - Metro: 7,657.5 km^{2} (2,956.6 sq mi)
- Elevation: 540 m (1,770 ft)

Population (2020)
  - City: 1,142,952
  - Rank: 23rd in North America; 8th in Mexico
  - Density: 3,415/km^{2} (8,840/sq mi)
  - Urban: 5,324,281
  - Urban density: 4,500/km^{2} (12,000/sq mi)
  - Metro: 5,341,177
- Demonym(s): Regiomontano(a); Regio(a)

GDP (PPP, constant 2024 values)
  - Year: 2024
  - Total (City): $111.3 billion
  - Per capita: $97,410
  - Total (Metro): $283.2 billion
  - Per capita (Metro): $53,224
- Time zone: UTC−06:00 (Zona Centro)
- Postal code: 64000 (Center)
- Area code: +52 81
- Website: www.monterrey.gob.mx (in Spanish)
- The words Ciudad de Monterrey shown on the flag and seal translate to "City of Monterrey" in English.

Monterrey (/ˌmɒntəˈreɪ/ MON-tə-RAY, Spanish: [monteˈrej]) is the capital and largest city of the northeastern Mexican state of Nuevo León. The city anchors the Monterrey metropolitan area, Mexico's second largest metropolitan area with a population of 5,347,000 as of 2026, according to the 2020 census, and Monterrey proper has a population of 1,142,194, making it Mexico’s eighth-largest city. Located at the foothills of the Sierra Madre Oriental, Monterrey is a major business and industrial hub in Mexico and the Americas. It is also the biggest industrial city in Mexico.

Monterrey serves as a commercial center of northern Mexico and is the base of many international corporations. It is considered a Beta World City, cosmopolitan and competitive. With rich history and culture, it is considered one of the most developed cities in the Americas.

The uninterrupted settlement of Monterrey began with its founding by Diego de Montemayor in 1596. Following the Mexican War of Independence, the city grew into a key business hub. The city experienced great industrial growth following the establishment of the Monterrey Foundry in 1900. It holds prominent positions in industries such as steel, cement, glass, auto parts, and brewing. The city's economic success has been partly attributed to its proximity to the United States–Mexico border and strong economic ties with the United States.

The city hosts important events, such as the Pa'l Norte and Machaca Fest music festivals, the former being the most important festival held outside of Mexico City. At the educational level, it is home to the Monterrey Institute of Technology and Higher Education, the largest private university in Mexico and one of the best ranked in the world. In addition, Monterrey is home to the Mexican Professional Baseball Hall of Fame, and once hosted the Special Summit of the Americas.

== Etymology ==
The city is named after Gaspar de Zúñiga, 5th Count of Monterrey, who was viceroy of New Spain from 1595 to 1603. His family originated in Monterrei, Galicia, Spain.

== History ==
=== Prehispanic history ===
Before the European foundation of the city, there was no established nation-state, and the population consisted of some indigenous nomad groups. Carved stone and cave painting in surrounding mountains and caves have allowed historians to identify four major groups in present-day Monterrey: Azalapas, Huachichiles, Coahuiltecos and Borrados.

=== Foundation ===
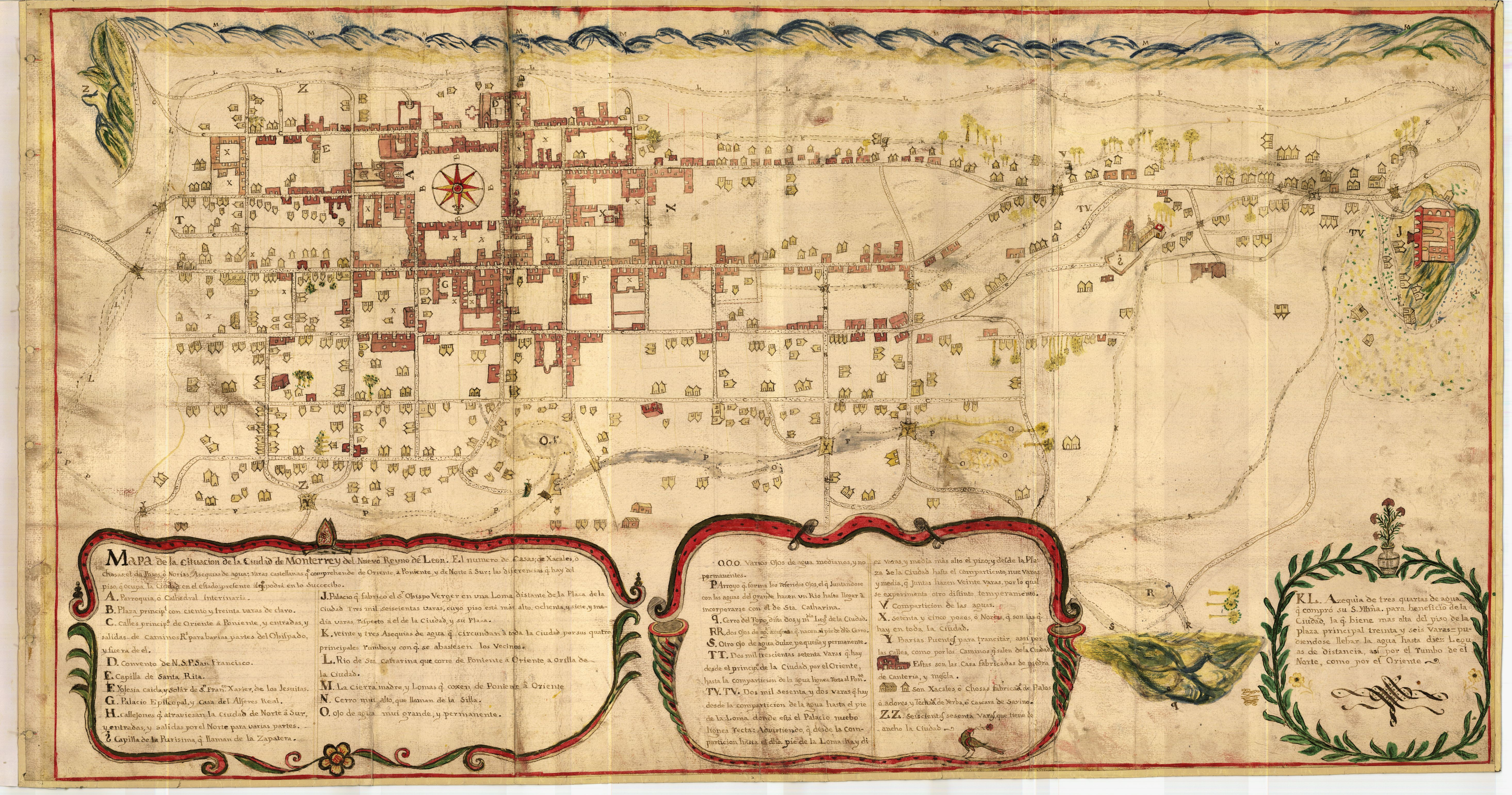
Map of Monterrey 1791

In the 16th century, the valley in which Monterrey sits was known as the Extremadura Valley, an area largely unexplored by the Spanish colonizers. The first expeditions and colonization attempts were led by conquistador Alberto del Canto, who named the city Santa Lucia, but they were unsuccessful because the Spanish were attacked by the native people and fled. The Spanish expeditionary Luis Carvajal y de la Cueva negotiated with King Philip II of Spain to establish a territory in northern New Spain that would be called Nuevo León, the "New Kingdom of León". In 1580, he arrived in the newly granted lands but it was not until 1582 that he established a settlement called San Luis Rey de Francia (named for Saint Louis IX of France) within present-day Monterrey. The New Kingdom of León extended westward from the port of Tampico to the limits of Nueva Vizcaya ("New Biscay", now State of Chihuahua), and around 1,000 kilometers northward. For eight years Nuevo León was abandoned and uninhabited, until a third expedition of 13 families led by conquistador Diego de Montemayor founded the Ciudad Metropolitana de Nuestra Señora de Monterrey ("Metropolitan City of Our Lady of Monterrey") on September 20, 1596, next to a water spring called Ojos de Agua de Santa Lucia, where the Museum of Mexican History and Santa Lucía riverwalk are now.

During the years of Spanish rule, Monterrey remained a small city, and its population varied from a few hundred to only dozens. The city facilitated trade between San Antonio (now in Texas), Tampico and from Saltillo to the center of the country. Tampico's port brought many products from Europe, while Saltillo concentrated the Northern Territories' trade with the capital, Mexico City. San Antonio was the key trade point with the northern foreign colonies (British and French).

=== After Mexican Independence (19th century) ===
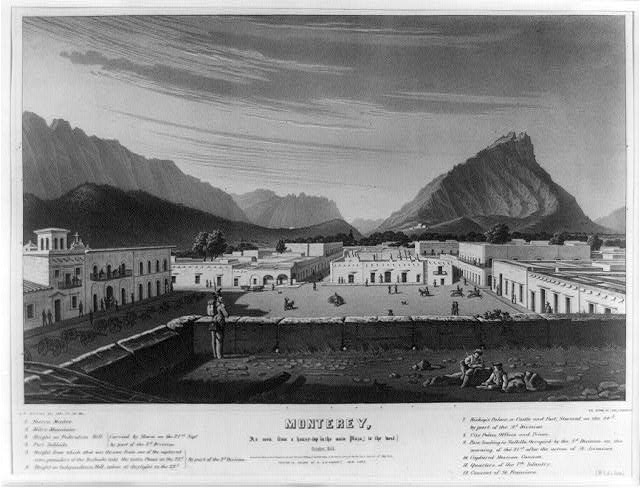
Monterrey in 1846

In the 19th century, after the Mexican Independence War, Monterrey rose as a key economic center for the newly formed nation, especially due to its balanced ties between Europe (with its connections to Tampico), the United States (with its connections to San Antonio), and the capital (through Saltillo). In 1824, the "New Kingdom of León" became the State of Nuevo León, and Monterrey was selected as its capital. But the political instability that followed the first 50 years of the new country allowed two American invasions and an internal secession war, during which the governor of the state annexed Coahuila and Tamaulipas states, designating Monterrey as the capital of the Republic of the Sierra Madre as it did before in 1840 for the Republic of the Rio Grande.

In 1846, the earliest large-scale engagement of the Mexican–American War took place in the city, known as the Battle of Monterrey. Mexican forces were forced to surrender but only after successfully repelling U.S. forces' first few advances on the city. The battle inflicted high casualties on both sides, much of them resulting from hand-to-hand combat within the walls of the city center. Many of the generals in the Mexican War against France were natives of the city, including Mariano Escobedo, Juan Zuazua (b. Lampazos de Naranjo, NL) and Jerónimo Treviño.

The brewery Cervecería Cuauhtémoc, one of the milestone local enterprises, was founded in 1890.

=== 20th century ===
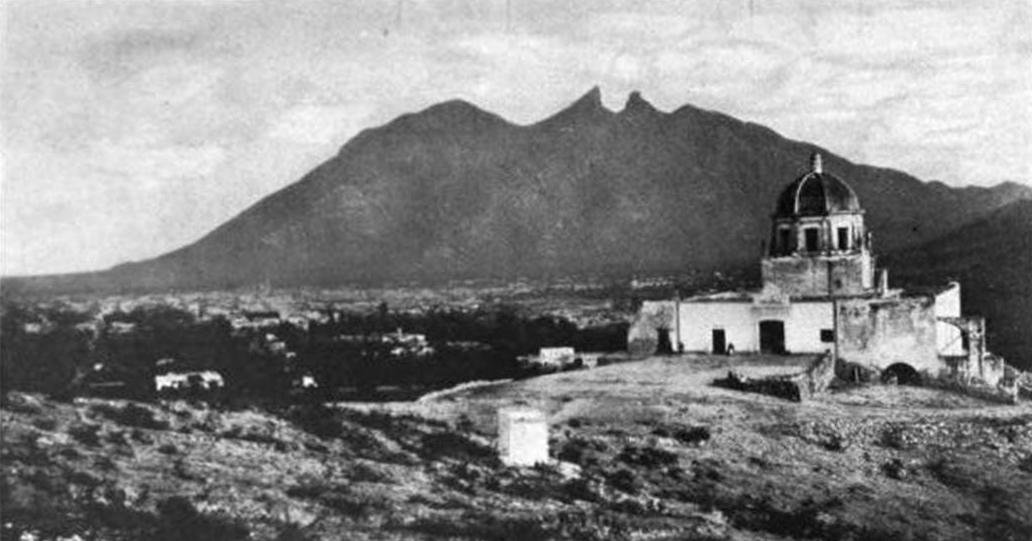
View of Monterrey and Cerro de la Silla in 1904

During the last decade of the 19th century, Monterrey was linked by railroad, which benefitted industry. It was during this period that José Eleuterio González founded the University Hospital, now one of northeast Mexico's best public hospitals, affiliated with the School of Medicine of the Autonomous University of Nuevo León (UANL). Antonio Basagoiti and other citizens founded the Fundidora de Fierro y Acero de Monterrey.

A steel-producing company that accelerated the already fast industrialization of the city was founded in 1900 and became one of the world's biggest. In 1986, Monterrey hosted several games of the 1986 FIFA World Cup.

Monterrey experienced a host of strikes against poor working conditions and the creation of unions during this period. The working class of Monterrey were subject to long hours, little pay, and dangerous working conditions, as were most other urban areas on the cusp of the Industrial Revolution. This led to several strikes and unionization. What makes Monterrey unique was the culture of solidarity shared by the working class. This culture of solidarity meant that workers from different companies would support one another in strikes and unionization. Regardless of how an individual company treated their employees, some would go on strike in support of others. This created tension between the employers and the employees to the point of violence and government intervention through the Mexican Revolution and into the 1940s.

In 1988, Hurricane Gilbert caused great damage to the city; the previously dry Santa Catarina River overflowed, causing over 100 deaths and economic damage.

=== 21st century ===
The city has hosted international events such as the 2002 United Nations Conference on Financing for Development with the participation of more than 50 heads of state and government, as well as other ministers and senior delegates from over 150 countries. The conference resulted in the adoption of the Monterrey Consensus, which has become a reference point for international development and cooperation. In 2004, the OAS Special Summit of the Americas was attended by almost all the presidents of the Americas.

In 2007, Monterrey held the Universal Forum of Cultures, with four million visitors. In 2008, Monterrey held the FINA World Junior Championships.

In 2010, Monterrey was hit by Hurricane Alex, with record-breaking rain bringing floods and causing severe economic damage. Damage estimates totaled US$1.885 billion and $16.9 billion MXN. Reconstruction and urban renewal ensued.

In August 2011 the city was the scene of a terror attack on a casino, in which more than 50 people were killed.

In summer 2022, the area experienced a severe drought, and city water service was cut off for several weeks to some areas, and in others limited to six hours a day. The city has three reservoirs. Cerro Prieto Reservoir dropped to 1% of its capacity and La Boca Reservoir dropped to 8%. El Cuchillo Reservoir remained at 30%, but limited aqueduct capacity led the government to announce in September 2022 a second aqueduct to connect it to Monterrey, with expected completion in July 2023. Heavy rains replenished reservoirs in early September. Controversy erupted over local bottling companies continuing to use well water to export beer and soft drinks during the crisis. In late September, the governor of Nuevo León declared the crisis over, but asked residents to voluntarily use no more than 100 liters per day.

== Geography ==
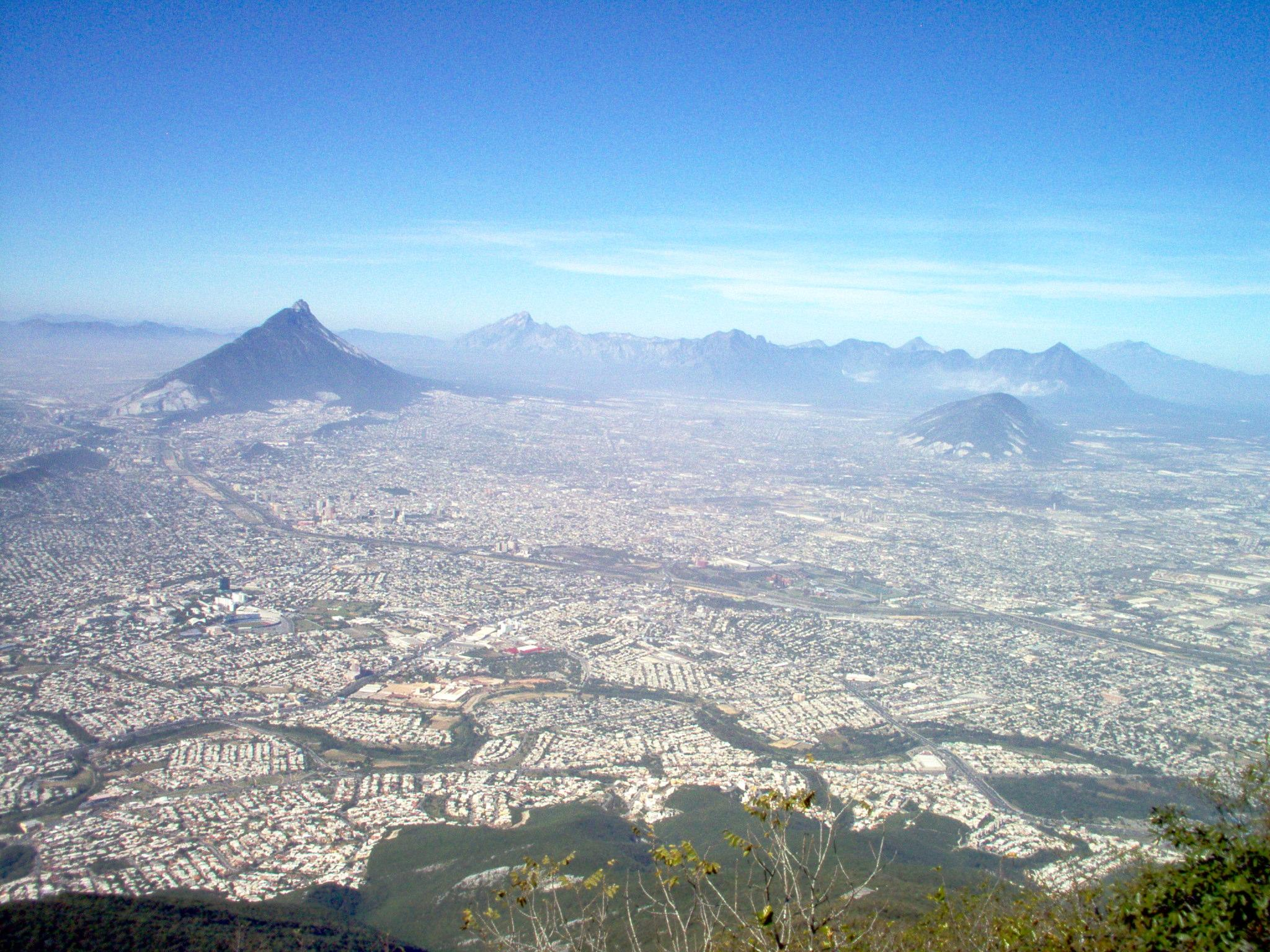
Monterrey seen from a Cerro de la Silla antenna. The mountain to the left in the background is Cerro de las Mitras; that on the right is Cerro del Topo Chico.

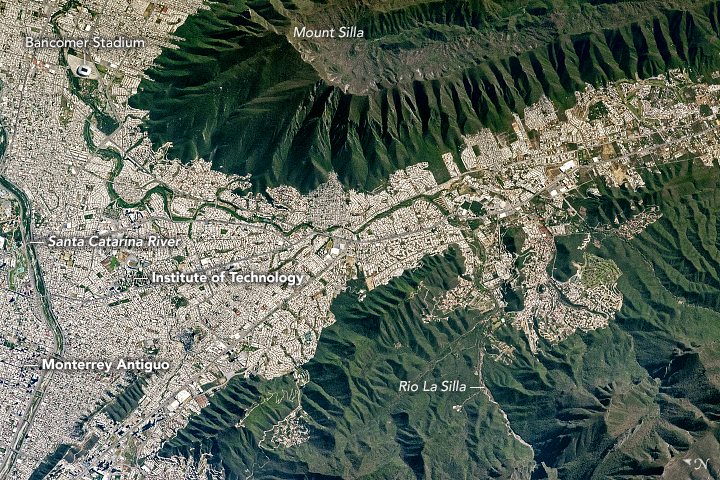
City of Monterrey from the ISS, 2017

The city of Monterrey is 540 metres (1,770 ft) above sea level in the northeastern state of Nuevo León. Monterrey translated literally from Spanish to English is "King Mount" or "King Mountain", and folk etymology claims that this refers to the city's topography and the large mountains that surround it (actually, the city was named after the wife of Gaspar de Zúñiga, 5th Count of Monterrey). The Santa Catarina River—dry most of the year on the surface but with flowing underground water—bisects Monterrey from east to west, separating the city into north and south halves, and drains the city to the San Juan River and Rio Grande.

Monterrey is adjacent to San Nicolás de los Garza, García and General Escobedo to the north; Guadalupe, Juárez and Cadereyta Jiménez to the east; Santiago to the south; and San Pedro Garza García and Santa Catarina to the west. Their combined metropolitan population is over 4,080,329 people.

Monterrey lies north of the foothills of the Sierra Madre Oriental mountain range. A small hill, the Cerro del Topo, and the smaller Topo Chico are in the suburbs of San Nicolás de los Garza and Escobedo. West of the city rises the Cerro de las Mitras (Mountain of the Mitres), which resemble the profile of several bishops with their mitres.

Cerro de la Silla (Saddle Mountain) dominates the view at the east of the city and is considered a major symbol of the city. Cerro de la Loma Larga—South of the Santa Catarina river—separates Monterrey from the suburb of San Pedro Garza García. At the summit of the Cerro del Obispado, north of the river, is the historic Bishopric Palace, site of one of the most important battles of the Mexican–American War.

=== Natural areas ===
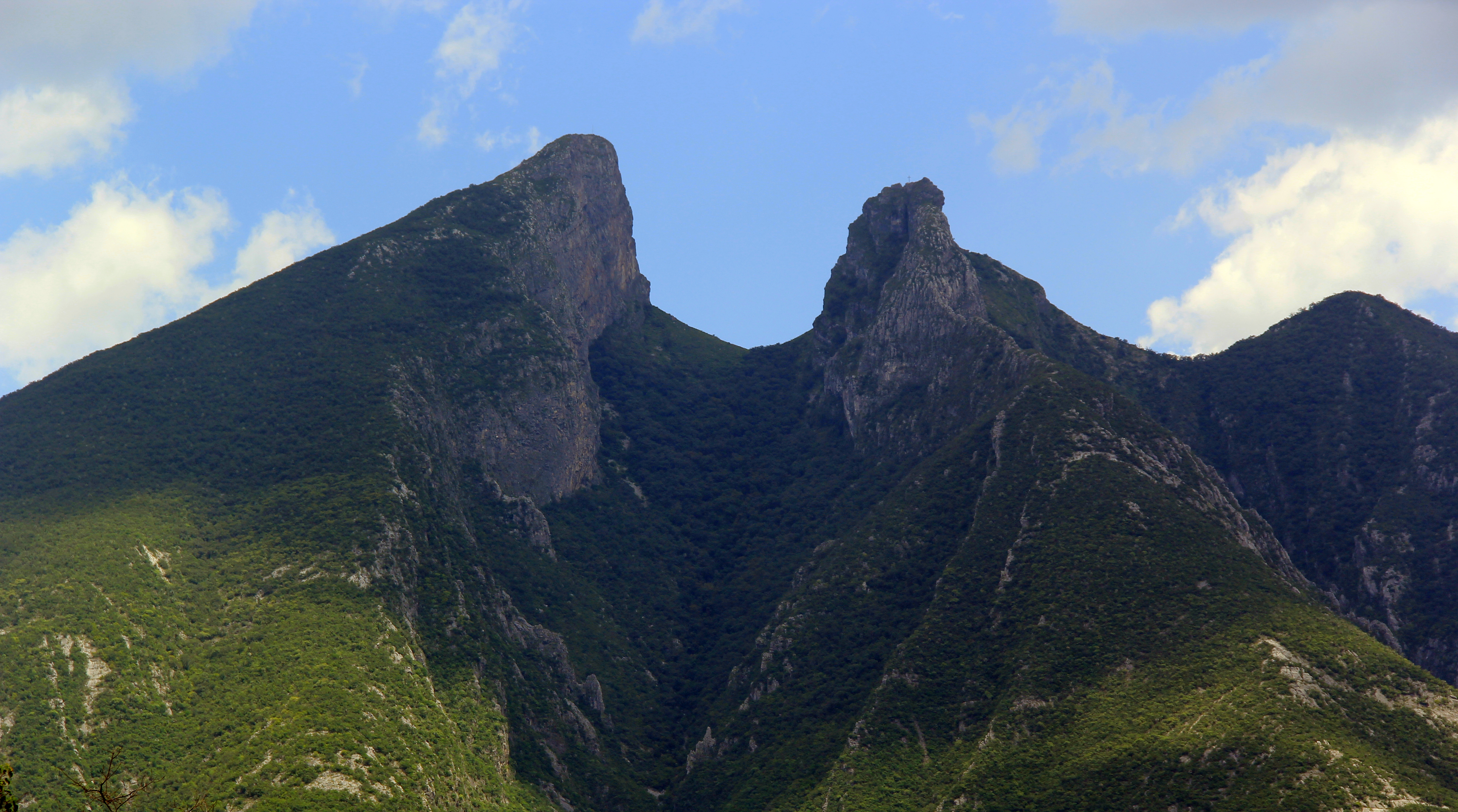
Cerro de la Silla

The mountains surrounding Monterrey are home to many canyons, trails, and roads that cross deserts and forests. The Sierra Madre Oriental mountains to the south of the city are part of the Parque Nacional Cumbres de Monterrey, which is part of UNESCO's Man and the Biosphere (MAB) Program of Biosphere Reserves, a designation the park received in 2006.

Key locations within Cumbres de Monterrey includes:

- Parque Ecológico Chipinque, which features forested areas predominantly made up of oak and oak-pine trees.
- La Estanzuela state park, located about 7 km (4 mi) south of Monterrey, offering a river and forested area.
- La Huasteca, to the west of the city, in the municipality of Santa Catarina.
- El Potrero Chico Climbing Area, located northeast of the city, in the municipality of Hidalgo.
- Garcia Caves – discovered in 1843 in Garcia, Nuevo León. These caves feature stunning stalagmite formations and snail fossils.
- Matacanes – in the municipality of Potrero Redondo in Santiago, Nuevo Leon. A 10-hour walking tour that includes rappel descents, underground rivers, waterfalls, and other natural obstacles.
- Hydrophobia Canyon – similar to Matacanes, but a completely aquatic area.
- Cascade Cola de Caballo – a spectacular waterfall in Santiago Nuevo Leon, formed by water that runs down from the mountains of Parque Nacional Cumbres de Monterrey. It is surrounded by impressive rock formations and expansive forests.

=== Climate ===
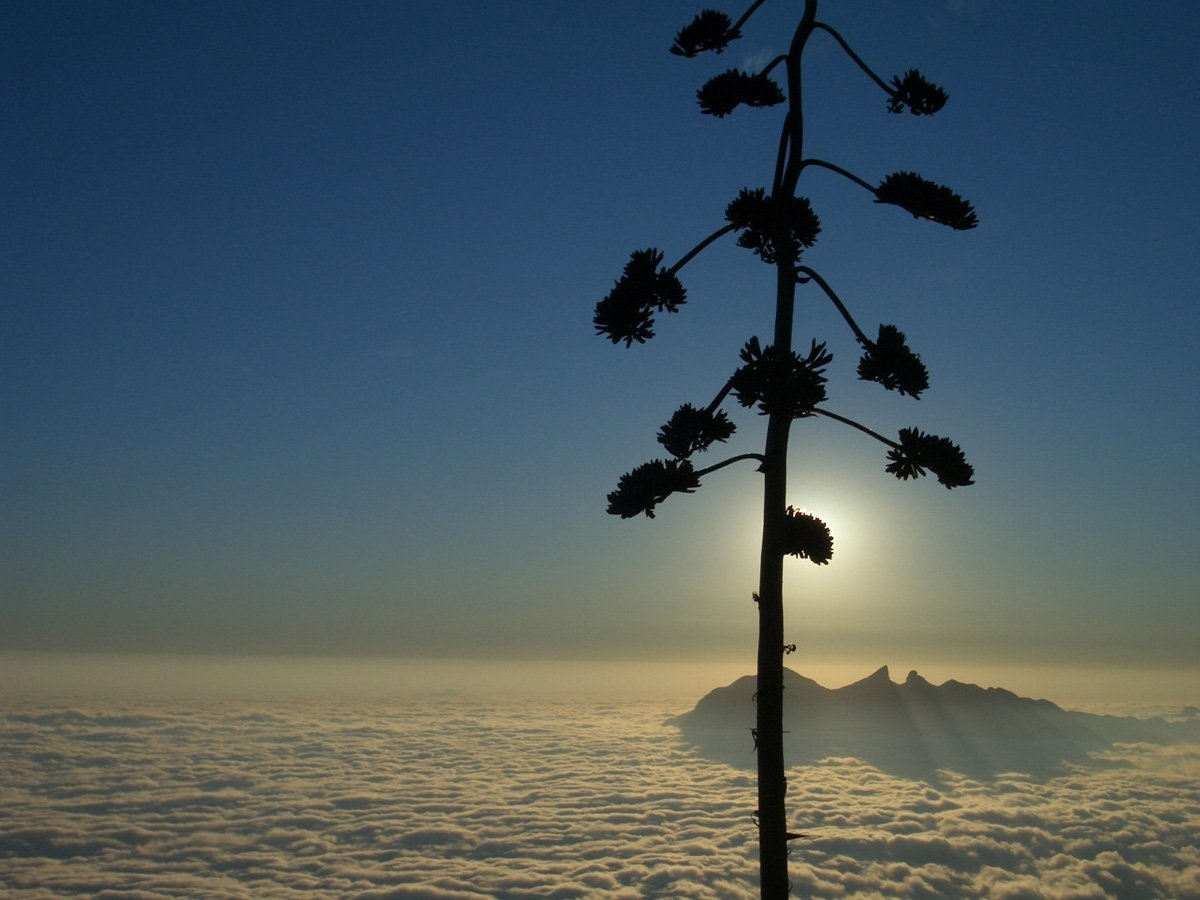
Cloud layer over Monterrey

Monterrey

Climate chart (precipitation, max. and min. temperature)
J	F	M	A	M	J	J	A	S	O	N	D
22 22 10	27 24 12	29 28 15	34 31 18	53 34 21	63 36 23	60 36 23	73 36 24	200 33 22	64 29 19	30 25 14	23 22 11
- █ Average max. and min. temperatures in °C
- █ Precipitation totals in mm
Imperial conversion
J	F	M	A	M	J	J	A	S	O	N	D
0.9 72 50	1.1 75 54	1.1 82 59	1.3 88 65	2.1 92 70	2.5 96 74	2.4 96 74	2.9 97 74	7.9 91 71	2.5 84 65	1.2 76 57	0.9 71 51
- █ Average max. and min. temperatures in °F
- █ Precipitation totals in inches

Monterrey has a semi-arid climate (Köppen climate classification BSh), with variable humidity but not having enough precipitation for a humid subtropical climate; the location on the eastern side of the Sierra Madre Oriental is influenced by modified Gulf airmasses. Being inland at a modest elevation, it is one of the warmest major cities in Mexico. Summers are generally hot and often humid, spring and fall are warm with variable humidity, and winters are mild with temperatures rarely below freezing. The average high in August is 36 °C (97 °F) and the average low is 24 °C (75 °F). The average January high is 22 °C (72 °F) and the average low in January is 10 °C (50 °F). Rainfall is scarce in winter, but more frequent during May through September.

Monterrey frequently experiences extreme weather changes; for example, it sometimes reaches 30 °C (86 °F) in January and February, the coldest months. The most extreme weather changes in summer occur with rainfall, which can reduce temperatures significantly, and the temporary absence of the northern winds in winter, which can lead to abnormally high temperatures. Seasons are not well defined; the warm season may start in February and may last until September. In April and May 2011 temperatures reached 45 °C (113 °F) or higher, causing fires and extreme heat. Snow is a very rare event, although an accumulation of 50 cm (20 in) in 8 hours occurred in January 1967. The most recent snowfall was in February 2021. Sleet and ice events occurred in January 2007, December 2009, January and February 2010, and February 2011, caused by temperatures around −5 °C (23 °F).

From June 30 to July 2, 2010, Monterrey was hit by the worst natural disaster in the city's history when Hurricane Alex delivered more than 584 mm (23 in) of rain in 72 hours, with areas reaching up to 1 m (39 in) of rain during that same period, destroying homes, avenues, highways and infrastructure, and leaving up to 200,000 families without water for a week or more. The amount of water that fell was equivalent to the average precipitation for a year. This was about 3–4 times as much rain as Hurricane Gilbert produced in the city on September 15, 1988. The death toll of Hurricane Alex was estimated to be around 20.

Climate data for Monterrey (1991–2020 normals, extremes 1929–present)
Month	Jan	Feb	Mar	Apr	May	Jun	Jul	Aug	Sep	Oct	Nov	Dec	Year
Record high °C (°F)	38.0 (100.4)	39.5 (103.1)	43.0 (109.4)	48.0 (118.4)	46.0 (114.8)	45.0 (113.0)	41.5 (106.7)	42.5 (108.5)	41.0 (105.8)	39.0 (102.2)	39.0 (102.2)	39.0 (102.2)	48.0 (118.4)
Mean daily maximum °C (°F)	22.4 (72.3)	23.9 (75.0)	27.7 (81.9)	31.2 (88.2)	33.5 (92.3)	35.7 (96.3)	35.6 (96.1)	36.1 (97.0)	32.6 (90.7)	29.0 (84.2)	24.5 (76.1)	21.8 (71.2)	29.5 (85.1)
Daily mean °C (°F)	15.2 (59.4)	17.8 (64.0)	20.9 (69.6)	24.2 (75.6)	26.5 (79.7)	28.6 (83.5)	28.8 (83.8)	28.9 (84.0)	26.1 (79.0)	23.1 (73.6)	18.9 (66.0)	15.6 (60.1)	22.9 (73.2)
Mean daily minimum °C (°F)	10.0 (50.0)	12.0 (53.6)	15.1 (59.2)	18.3 (64.9)	21.3 (70.3)	23.1 (73.6)	23.2 (73.8)	23.5 (74.3)	21.8 (71.2)	18.6 (65.5)	13.9 (57.0)	10.5 (50.9)	17.6 (63.7)
Record low °C (°F)	−7.0 (19.4)	−7.0 (19.4)	−1.0 (30.2)	4.2 (39.6)	8.0 (46.4)	11.5 (52.7)	11.0 (51.8)	12.2 (54.0)	10.0 (50.0)	1.0 (33.8)	−5.0 (23.0)	−7.5 (18.5)	−7.5 (18.5)
Average precipitation mm (inches)	21.8 (0.86)	27.3 (1.07)	29.1 (1.15)	33.6 (1.32)	53.2 (2.09)	62.6 (2.46)	59.9 (2.36)	72.7 (2.86)	199.7 (7.86)	64.1 (2.52)	30.0 (1.18)	22.5 (0.89)	666.6 (26.24)
Average precipitation days (≥ 0.1 mm)	4.4	4.0	4.4	4.5	7.0	5.5	4.2	5.5	9.1	5.9	4.8	3.7	63.0
Average relative humidity (%)	67.5	65.7	63.3	63.1	67.1	65.4	64.2	63.7	71.3	71.6	71.0	69.0	66.9
Mean monthly sunshine hours	160.3	161.8	181.3	187.6	206.5	222.8	237.9	258.8	184.4	179.0	156.3	139.3	2,275.9
Source 1: NOAA
Source 2: (Ogimet) SMN / NOAA

== Demographics ==
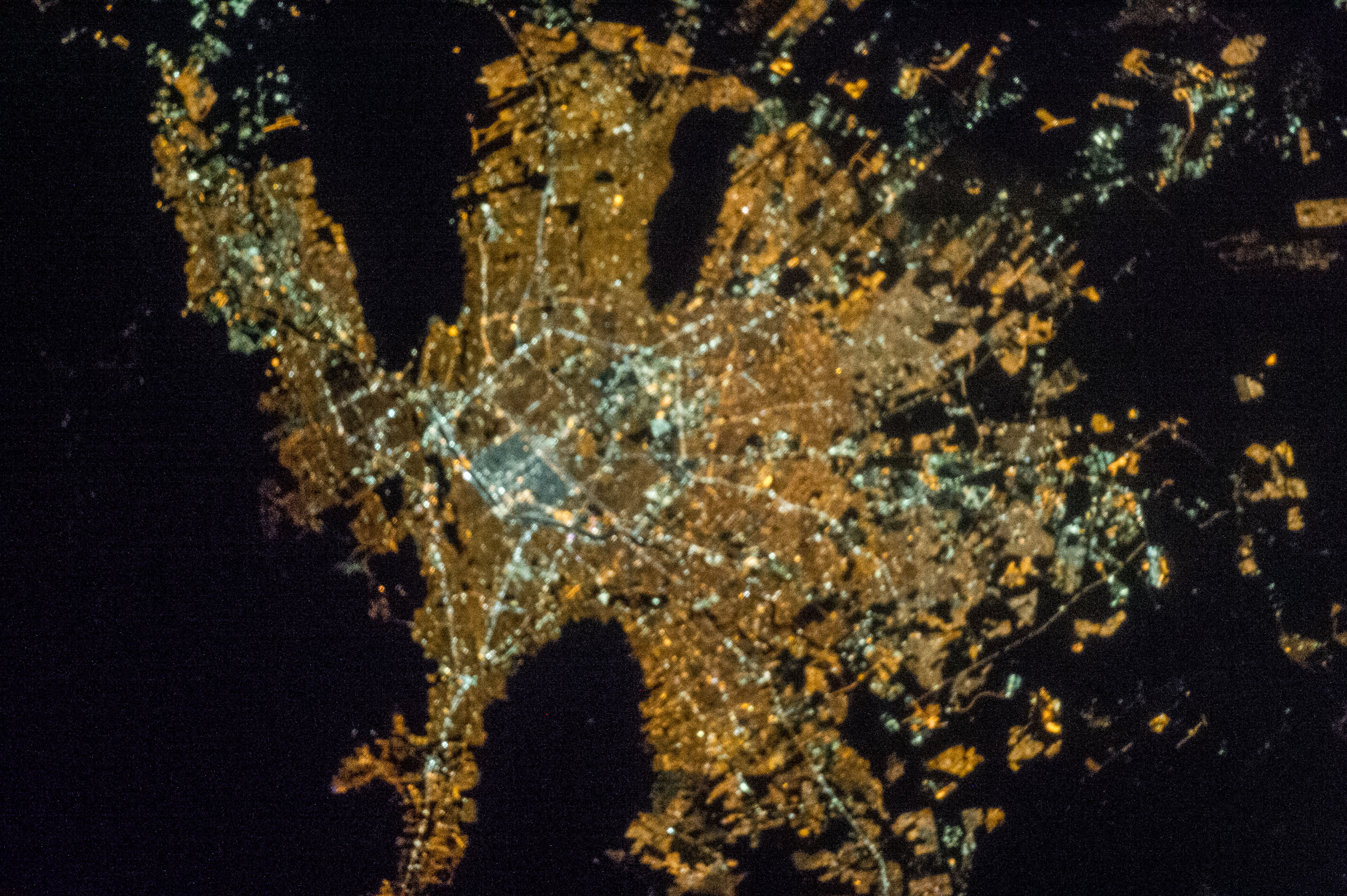
Monterrey metropolitan area at night from ISS

According to the national INEGI census of 2010, of the total population of the state of Nuevo León, 87.3% lived in the Monterrey metropolitan area.

The Monterrey metropolitan area is the second most populous in Mexico, with more than 5 million inhabitants. It comprises the municipalities of Monterrey, Apodaca, Escobedo, García, Guadalupe, Santiago, Juárez, San Nicolás de los Garza, San Pedro Garza García, Santa Catarina and Salinas Victoria.

=== Education ===
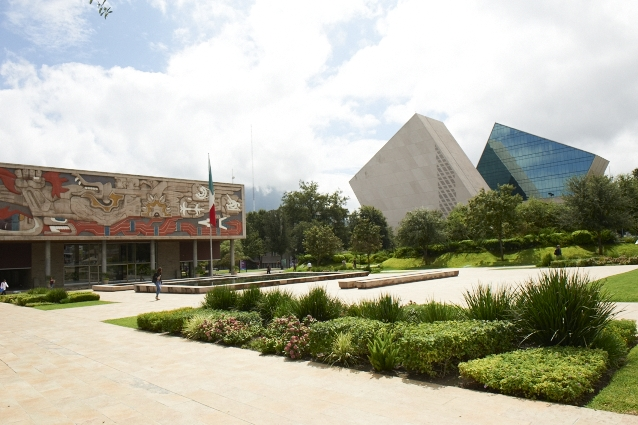
Monterrey Institute of Technology and Higher Education

Monterrey has an estimated 3.7% illiteracy rate. In 2005, of an estimated 983,359 inhabitants above 6 years of age, 36,689 were illiterate. In 2005, the city had 72 public libraries, with 298,207 books available, serving an estimated 478,047 readers.

The Universidad Autónoma de Nuevo León (Autonomous University of Nuevo León, UANL) is the third-largest Mexican university and is ranked by the Reader's Digest-AC Nielsen Survey 2005 as the top public university in northeast Mexico. Its main campus, Ciudad Universitaria (University City), covers approximately 67,630,000 square metres (17,000 acres). The UANL system comprises 26 colleges (faculties), 22 graduate divisions, 29 high schools, 1 center of bilingual education and 3 technical high schools. Its medical school is considered one of the most advanced in Latin America.

Monterrey is also the headquarters of the Instituto Tecnológico y de Estudios Superiores de Monterrey (Monterrey Institute of Technology and Higher Studies), which ranked No. 291 at the 2013 QS World University Rankings in Engineering and Information Technology, No. 201 in Social Sciences and No. 279 overall. It also holds a "QS Stars Rated for Excellence" of 5 stars.

The Universidad Regiomontana was founded in 1969 with the support of local leading multinational corporations such as Cemex, Alfa, Femsa, Gamesa, Protexa and CYDSA. It is a private educational institution offering university-preparatory school, undergraduate and graduate programs, having agreements with more than 350 universities across the globe (such as the recent expanded agreement with Texas A&M International University). It is member of GATE (Global Alliance for Transnational Education) and FIMPES (Federación de Instituciones Mexicanas Particulares de Educación Superior) and its administration holds an ISO 9001 Certification. The university is nationally recognized, so its degree equivalency is comparable to that of a regionally accredited university in the United States. The university is dedicated to educating students in an atmosphere of freedom and humanism, and providing students hands-on experience in their field of study. Its urban campus further stimulates the city's vibrant economy and attracts working professionals who complement and enrich the academic experience.

The Universidad de Monterrey was founded by the religious congregations of the Sisters of Immaculate Mary of Guadalupe, the nuns of the Sacred Heart and the Marist and La Salle brothers, all of them supported by an association of Catholic citizens.

=== Health ===
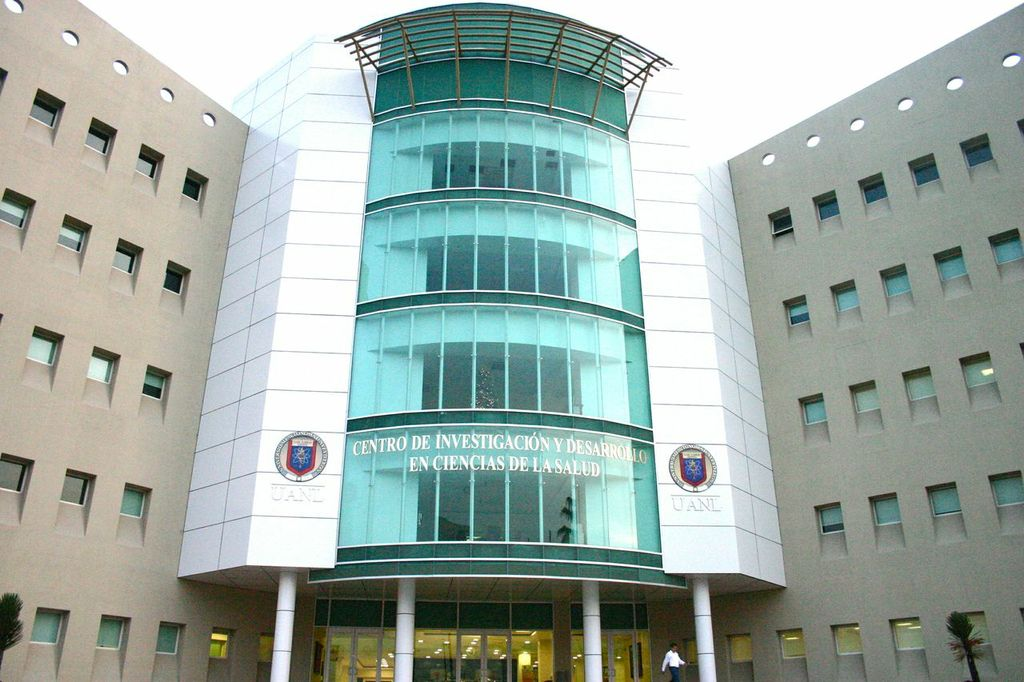
Center for Research and Development in Health Sciences building of the Autonomous University of Nuevo León

Monterrey generally has a very highly ranked medical infrastructure with some internationally acclaimed hospitals, including three with Joint Commission accreditation. The Joint Commission is a private healthcare accreditation group. There are both public and private hospitals. The Mexican Social Security Institute (IMSS) has two major regional hospitals in the city, the Specialties Regional Hospital # 33, the cardiac centre (Hospital #34), and the Gynecology and Obstetrics Regional Hospital, serving also the northeastern states of Coahuila and Tamaulipas. Several smaller IMSS hospitals can be found such as the Traumatology and Orthopedics Hospital and the General Hospital # 25. State government owns the Metropolitan Hospital, located in the suburb of San Nicolás de los Garza and the Hospital of the Children and Mother Care in Guadalupe suburb.

The Autonomous University of Nuevo León runs the public University Hospital, with a high-level shock-trauma unit and a specialized clinic for child cancer treatment. It is recognized as the best public hospital in the northeast of Mexico and the UANL School of Medicine as one of the best in the country. On the other hand, the Tecnológico de Monterrey runs the Hospital San José-Tec de Monterrey private hospital.

Monterrey has healthcare standards above the average for Mexico. It has several hospitals, including Hospital Cima (formerly Santa Engracia) of the International Hospital Corporation. Its convenient location, low prices and quality of medical care have made of Monterrey a very popular medical tourism destination for United States patients.

== Governance ==
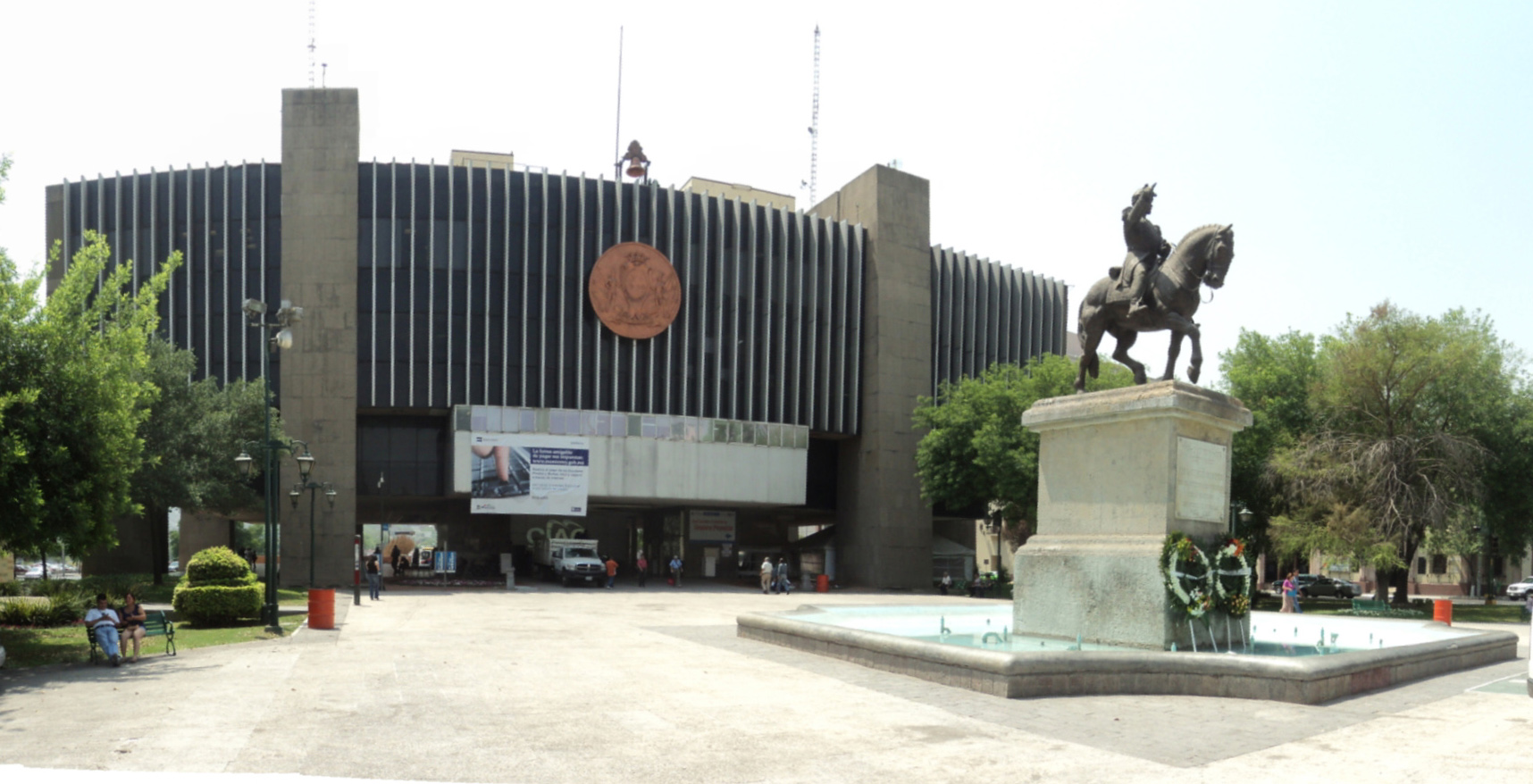
Palacio Municipal de Monterrey (Monterrey City Hall)

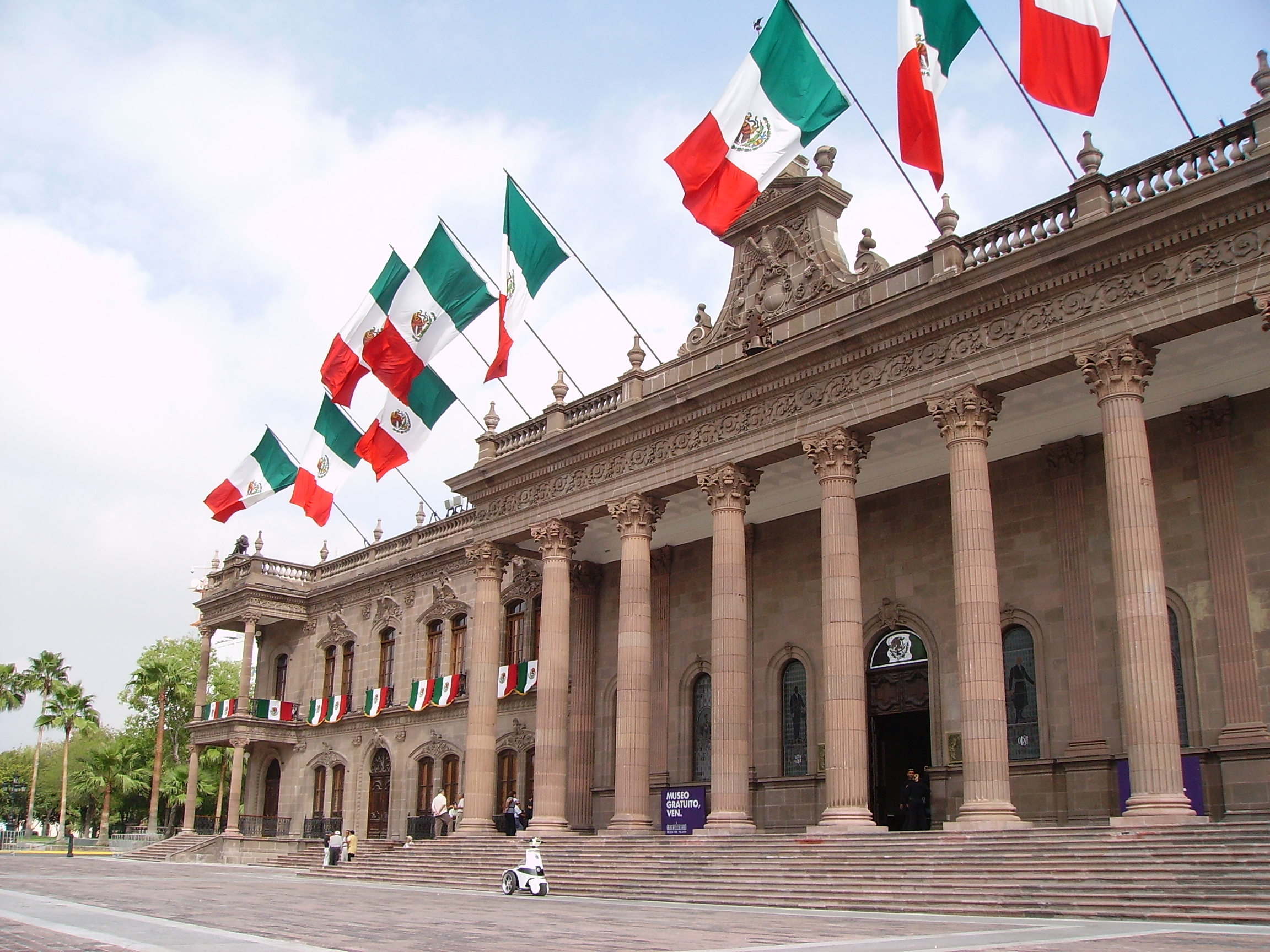
The Palace of Government of Nuevo León (Governor's Office)

Monterrey and its metropolitan area are municipalities governed by a democratically elected Presidente Municipal (Municipal President), or mayor, for a period of three years. The political environment is one of civility and in the last decade political parties have been alternating office. The current mayor of Monterrey is Adrián de la Garza Santos.

The City Council of Monterrey (Cabildo de Monterrey) is an organ integrated by the mayor, the Regidores and the Síndicos. The mayor is the executor of the determinations of the City Council and the person directly in charge of public municipal administration. The Regidores represent the community and collectively define city policies. The Síndicos are in charge of watching and legally defending city interests, as well as of monitoring the treasury and the municipal patrimony.

The political parties with representation in the city are the Institutional Revolutionary Party or PRI, the National Action Party or PAN, the Party of the Democratic Revolution or PRD, the Labor Party or PT, the Green Party, Citizens' Movement, Socialdemocratic Party and Nueva Alianza.

=== Public safety ===
In 2005, Monterrey was ranked one of the safest cities in Mexico, and it was one of the two safest in 2006. However, since 2008 the city has experienced violence related to turf battles between rival drug cartels. The year marked the most violent period in the city's history. Although drug dealers remain a major concern, military offensives and police captures of important drug-cartel leaders have weakened the cartels trying to establish themselves. Despite these challenges, the city is considered safe for travel during both the day and at night, with the violence that does occur being cartel against rival cartel.

Monterrey has two police departments: the Police of the City of Monterrey (locally known as the Policía Regia), which is under the municipal government, and State Public Safety which oversees more remote areas. The Policía Regia is responsible for protecting the downtown and main areas of the city, while State Public Safety is focused on the outskirts. Following the 2011 attack on the Casino Royale, security has been reinforced by military and federal police.

== Infrastructure ==
=== Transportation ===
==== Air ====
Monterrey International Airport (MTY)

The city is served by two international airports: Monterrey International Airport (served by major international carriers and moving more than 6.5 million passengers in 2007) and Del Norte International Airport, a primarily private airport.

Monterrey is linked through frequent non-stop flights to many domestic destinations, to United States hubs (Atlanta, Chicago-O'Hare, Dallas/Fort Worth, Detroit, Houston-Intercontinental, JFK/New York, and Las Vegas), and to European cities. Monterrey is the second most important city for the operating routes of Aeroméxico.

Four airlines have their operational bases and headquarters in Monterrey: Volaris, Aeroméxico Connect, VivaAerobus and Magnicharters. Regarding ground transportation from Monterrey International Airport, taxi services link the airport with the city and charge around US$20 for a one-way ride to the city. From this airport, there is a bus shuttle to nearby Saltillo. Inter-city bus services run daily into the interior, as well as north to the US border and points beyond.

==== Roadways ====
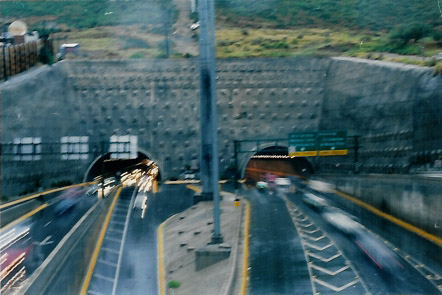
Loma Larga Tunnel

Monterrey is connected with the United States–Mexico border, the sea and inland Mexico through different roads, including the Carretera Nacional (also known as the Pan-American Highway) that runs from Nuevo Laredo to Mexico City and south, and the Carretera Interoceánica connecting Matamoros with the port of Mazatlán on the Pacific; it is also crossed by Highways 40, 45, and 57. The divided highway Monterrey-Saltillo-Matehuala-Mexico City is the main land corridor to interior Mexico.

==== Public transport ====
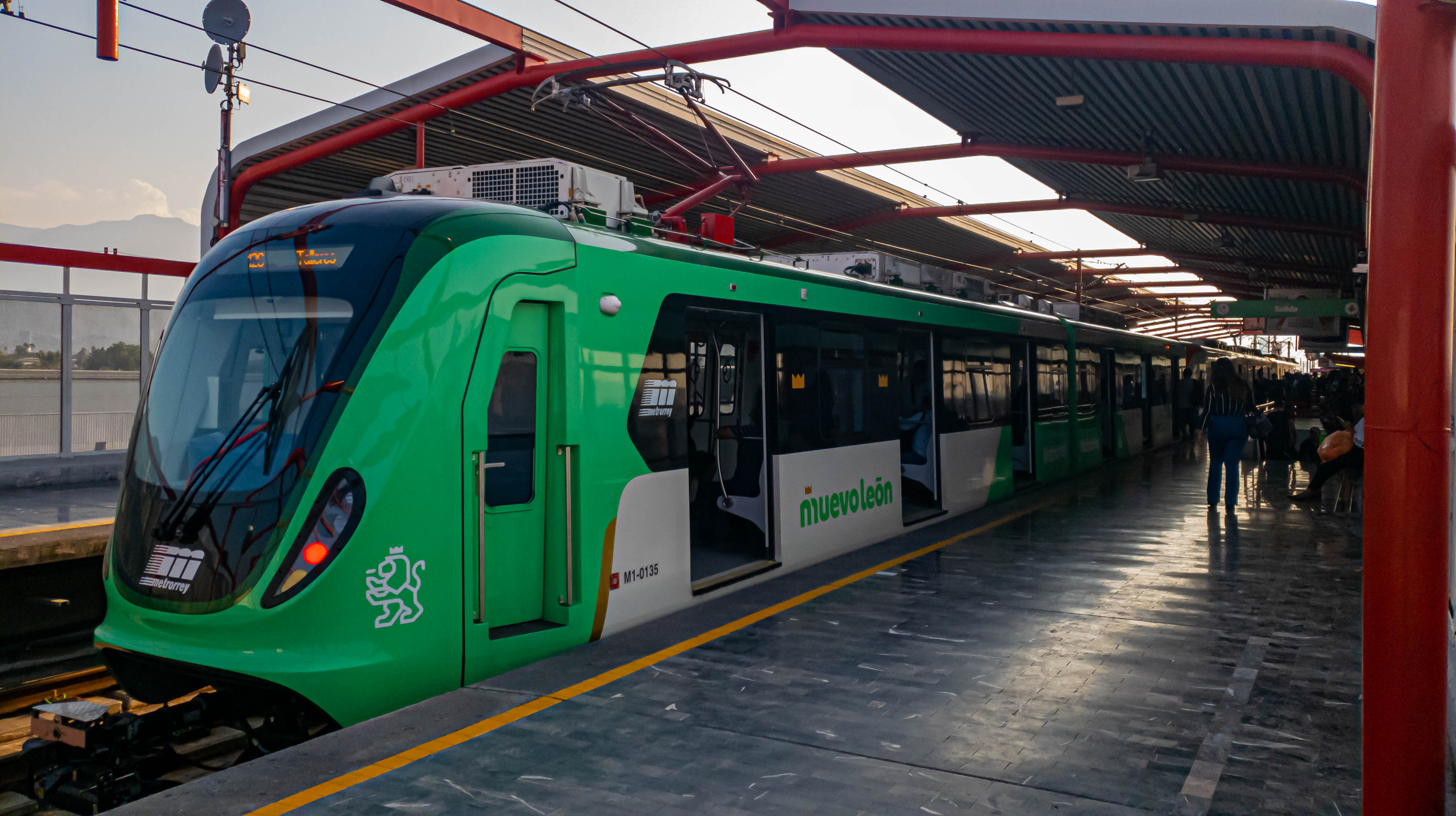
Metrorrey

The city has a rapid transit system called Metrorrey, which currently has 3 lines, and a BRT called Ecovía.

There are several between-cities bus lines at the bus station downtown. There are arrivals and departures into deeper Mexico, to the U.S. border and into the United States. Monterrey is also connected by at least three important railroad freight lines: Nuevo Laredo-Mexico City, Monterrey-Tampico, and Monterrey-Pacific (Mazatlán).

The average amount of time people spend commuting with public transit in Monterrey, for example to and from work, on a weekday is 85 minutes. 25% of public transit riders ride for more than 2 hours every day. The average amount of time people wait at a stop or station for public transit is 17 min, while 29% of riders wait for over 20 minutes on average every day. The average distance people usually ride in a single trip with public transit is 9.5 km, while 25% travel for over 12 km in a single direction.

=== Water ===
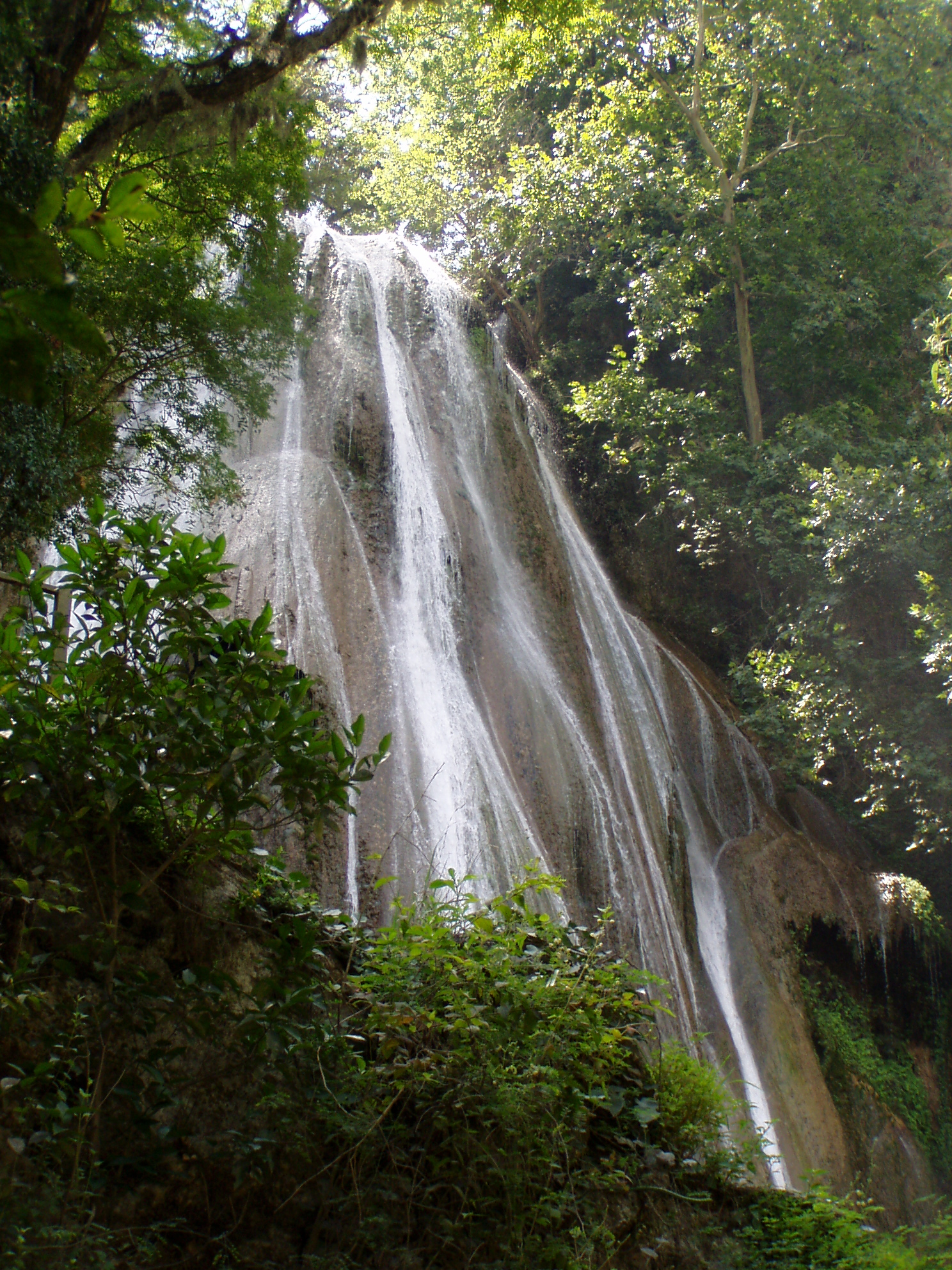
Cola de Caballo (horse's tail)

Early in the 20th century, Monterrey, Mexico began a successful economic metamorphosis and growth pattern that remains an exception in Mexico. This all began with increased investments in irrigation that fueled a boom in agriculture and ranching for this northern Mexican city. The economic growth has fueled income disparity for the 3.86 million residents who live in the Monterrey Metro area (MMA). In addition, the rapid urbanization has taken a large toll on the water resources. In addressing many of this challenges, the city of Monterrey has become a model for sound and effective Integrated urban water management.

The challenges that Monterrey has confronted pertain to scarcity of surface water resources, poor water quality due to untreated industrial effluents, political cycles and term-limits which can limit long-term vision, and water disputes between urban and agricultural users. Monterrey has good groundwater "well-fields" that supply about 40% of the water demand for the city and generally are not over-exploited because of good connections to high-yield aquifer systems in the central parts of the "Curvatura de Monterrey". These wells are managed as storage reserves that can be used in time of drought, which is quite common in this region of Mexico.

Also unique to Monterrey is an arrangement made between farmers and the municipality, whereby the farmers grant the use of their water rights from the nearby Cuchillo reservoir and the municipal water utility SADM (Servicios de Agua y Drenaje de Monterrey) returns urban used and treated water to farmers for irrigation. This arrangement has benefited both parties since SADM supplements its water supply with high quality but internmitent supply from the Cuchillo reservoir and farmers receive a consistent and full of nutrients water for irrigation. The longer term outlook for the area is for urbanization to continue and water availability to decrease, therefore, new water management strategies will have to be created.

== Economy ==
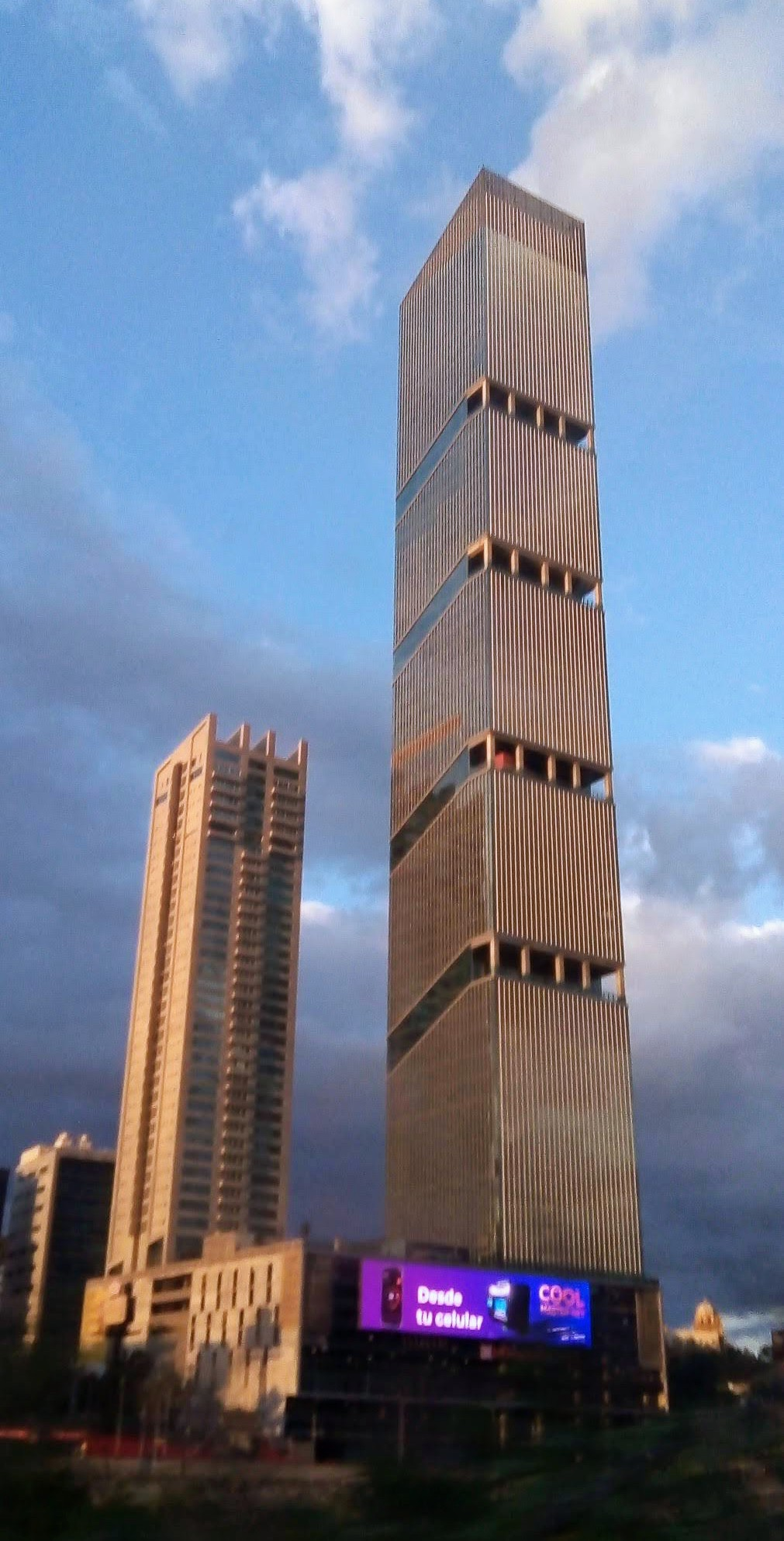
Torres Obispado, the tallest skyscraper in Latin America

Monterrey is a major industrial center in northern Mexico, with a GDP (PPP) of US$140 billion and a GDP (PPP) per capita of US$31,900 in 2015. The city was rated by Fortune magazine in 1999 as the best city in Latin America for business and is currently ranked third best by the América Economía magazine.

The city has prominent positions in sectors such as steel, cement, glass, auto parts, and brewing. The city's economic wealth has been attributed in part to its proximity to the United States-Mexico border and economic links to the United States.

Industrialization was accelerated in the mid-19th century by the Compañia Fundidora de Fierro y Acero Monterrey, a steel-processing company. Today, Monterrey is home to transnational conglomerates such as Cemex (the world's third largest cement company), FEMSA (Coca-Cola Latin America, largest independent Coca-Cola bottler in the world), Alfa (petrochemicals, food, telecommunications and auto parts), Axtel (telecommunications), Vitro (glass), Selther (leading mattress and rest systems firm in Latin America), Gruma (food), and Banorte (financial services). The FEMSA corporation owned a large brewery, the Cuauhtémoc Moctezuma Brewery (Cervecería Cuauhtémoc Moctezuma) that produces the brands Sol, Tecate, Indio, Dos Equis and Carta Blanca among others, in the beginning of the year Cuauhtémoc Moctezuma Brewery was sold to Dutch-based company Heineken. By the end of the same year, there were more than 13,000 manufacturing companies, 55,000 retail stores, and more than 52,000 service firms in Monterrey.

The metals sector, dominated by iron and steel, accounted for 6 percent of manufacturing GNP in 1994. Mexico's steel industry is centered in Monterrey, where the country's first steel mills opened in 1903. Steel processing plants in Monterrey, privatized in 1986, accounted for about half of Mexico's total steel output in the early 1990s. The region also has metal reclamation industry, like Zinc Nacional, which processes hazardous waste electric arc furnace dust to extract useful metals for resale. In 2022, Monterrey receives almost half of all metallic hazardous waste the US exported.

Monterrey was ranked 94th worldwide and fifth in Latin America in terms of Quality of Life according to Mercer Human Resource Consulting (2006), and was ranked second in 2005 and fourth in 2006, according to América Economía.

Some of the shopping malls in the city include Paseo San Pedro, Paseo La Fe, Plaza Fiesta San Agustín, Galerías Monterrey, and Galerías Valle Oriente.

In March 2023, Tesla announced that it would build a new gigafactory—Gigafactory Mexico—near Monterrey. The factory will be a ~US$10 billion investment, and will employ thousands of workers when fully operational, as well as employ many thousands of workers during construction.

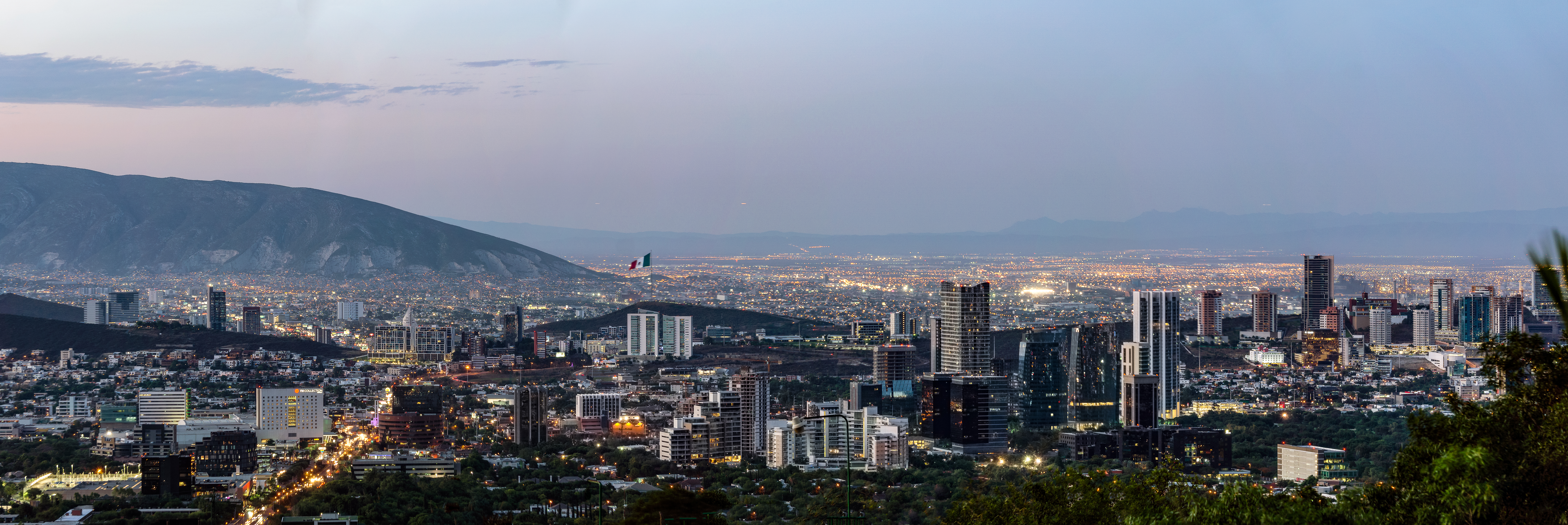
Panoramic image of Monterrey

== Culture ==
The 2007 Universal Forum of Cultures was an international cultural event held in Monterrey from September 20 to December 8, 2007.

=== Cuisine ===
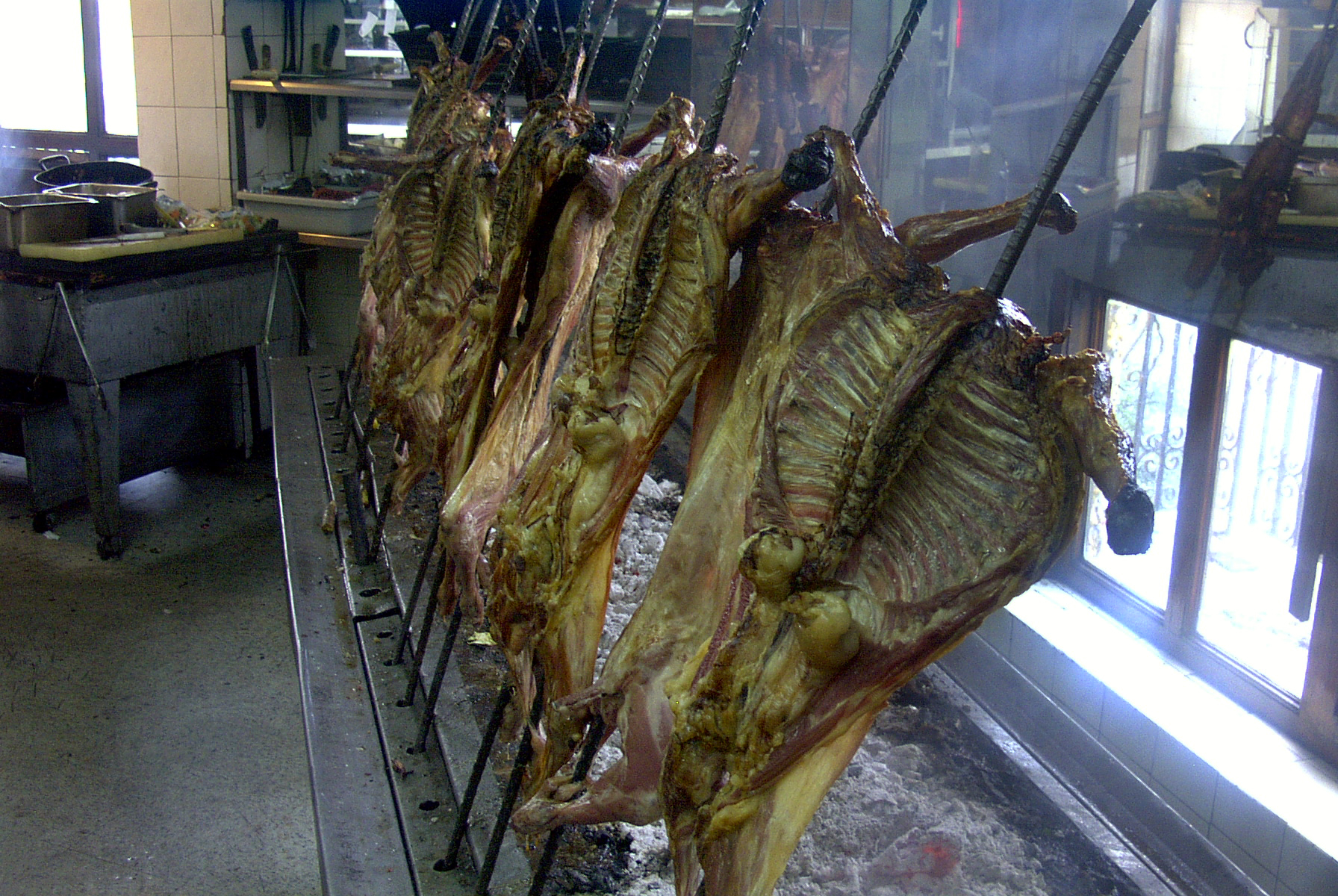
Cabrito (kid goat) is Monterrey's most popular traditional dish

The most traditional dish from Monterrey is cabrito, kid goat cooked on embers. Other local dishes and customs that perhaps date back to the Crypto-Judaism of Monterrey's founding families are the "semita" (bread without leavening), the capirotada dessert (a mix of cooked bread, cheese, raisins, peanuts, and crystallized sugarcane juice), and the relative absence of pork dishes. Another famous local dish is machacado con huevo.

Carne asada on weekends remains a tradition among Monterrey families. It is usually served with grilled onions, baked potatoes and sausages or chopped as tacos. Locally brewed beer and cola are an almost mandatory part of the weekly ritual. "Glorias" and "obleas", made from goat milk, are both traditional Nuevo León desserts.

Monterrey has a wide gastronomic variety due to its climate geography, climate, texture, a mixture of ethnics groups, and their influences, a series of unique dishes have been created through more than 400 years of history.

=== Chinatown ===
After the USMCA was ratified, an industrial Chinatown with signs in both Spanish and Chinese formed in Monterrey to take advantage of tariff free trade with the United States given its proximity to Texas.

=== Contemporary music ===
Since the 1960s, Monterrey has been known for "Norteño" music. Monterrey has witnessed the birth of several bands that have become internationally acclaimed. Their genres vary considerably. Bands include Plastilina Mosh, Control Machete, Kinky, El Gran Silencio, Celso Pina, Jumbo, Division Minuscula, 3Ball MTY, and The Warning. The song "Los Oxidados" by Plastilina Mosh opened the 2005 movie Mr. & Mrs. Smith.

=== Landmarks ===
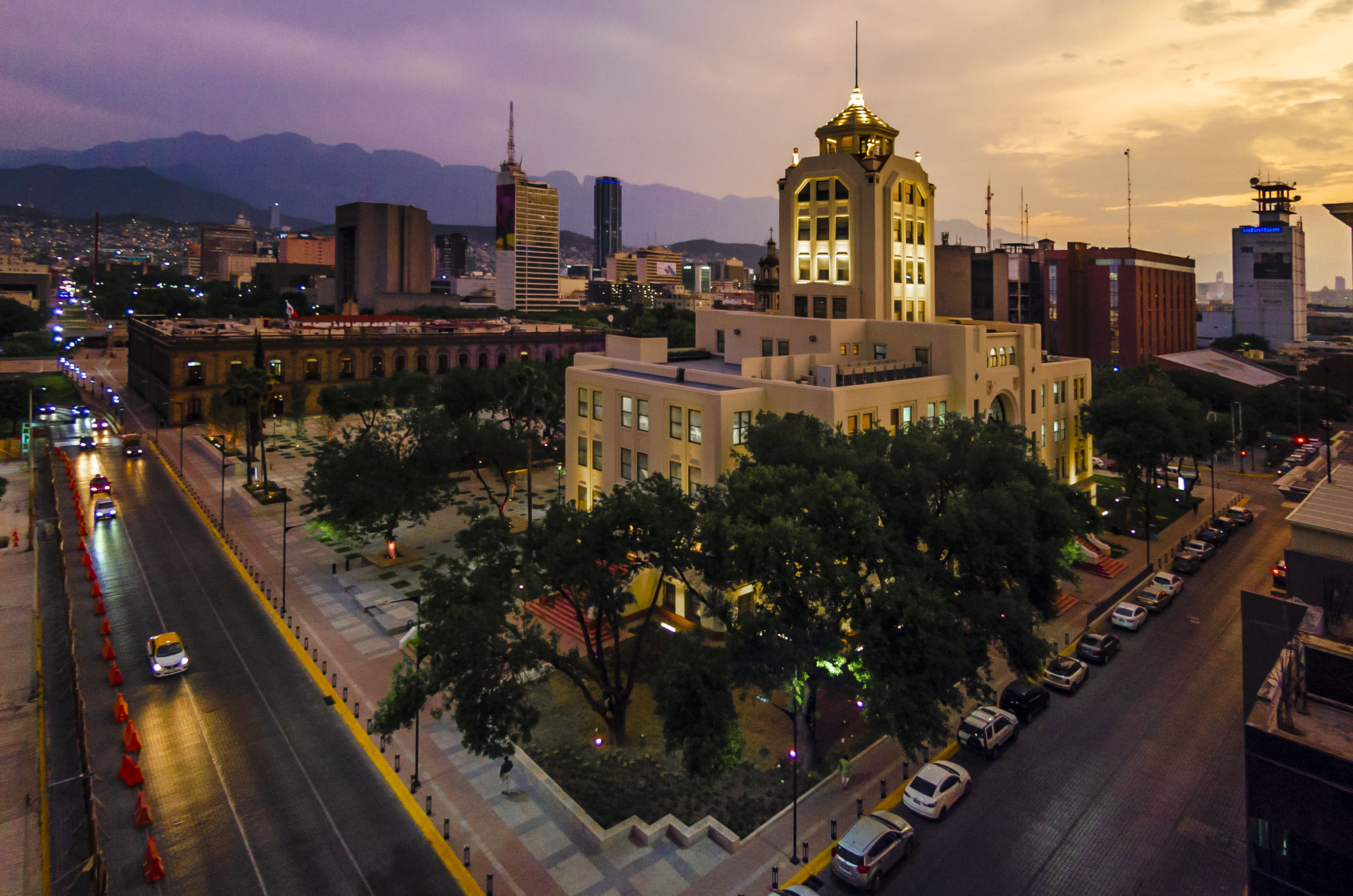
Seat of LABNL Lab Cultural Ciudadano

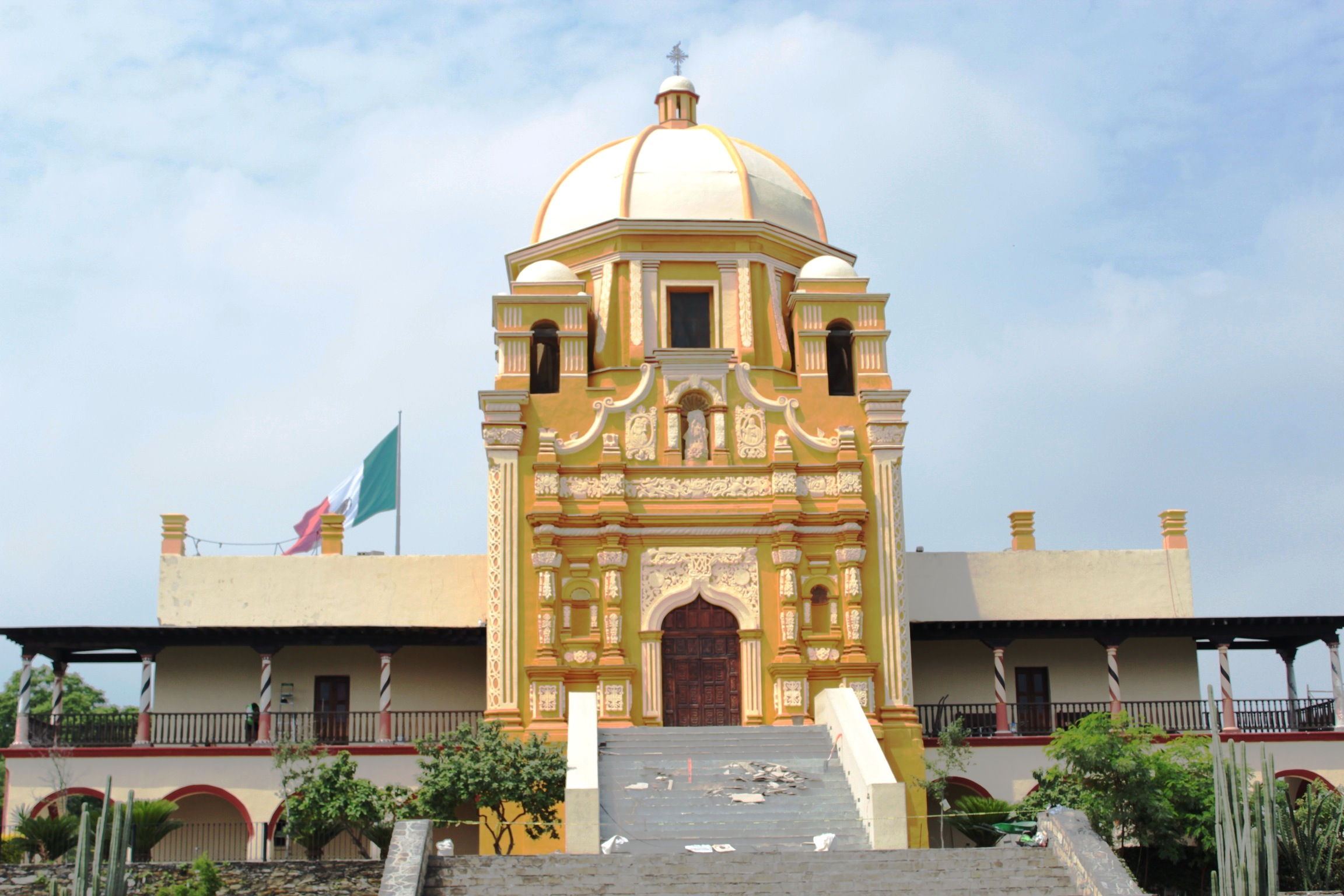
Ex-Bishop of Monterrey Palace in Bishop Slope

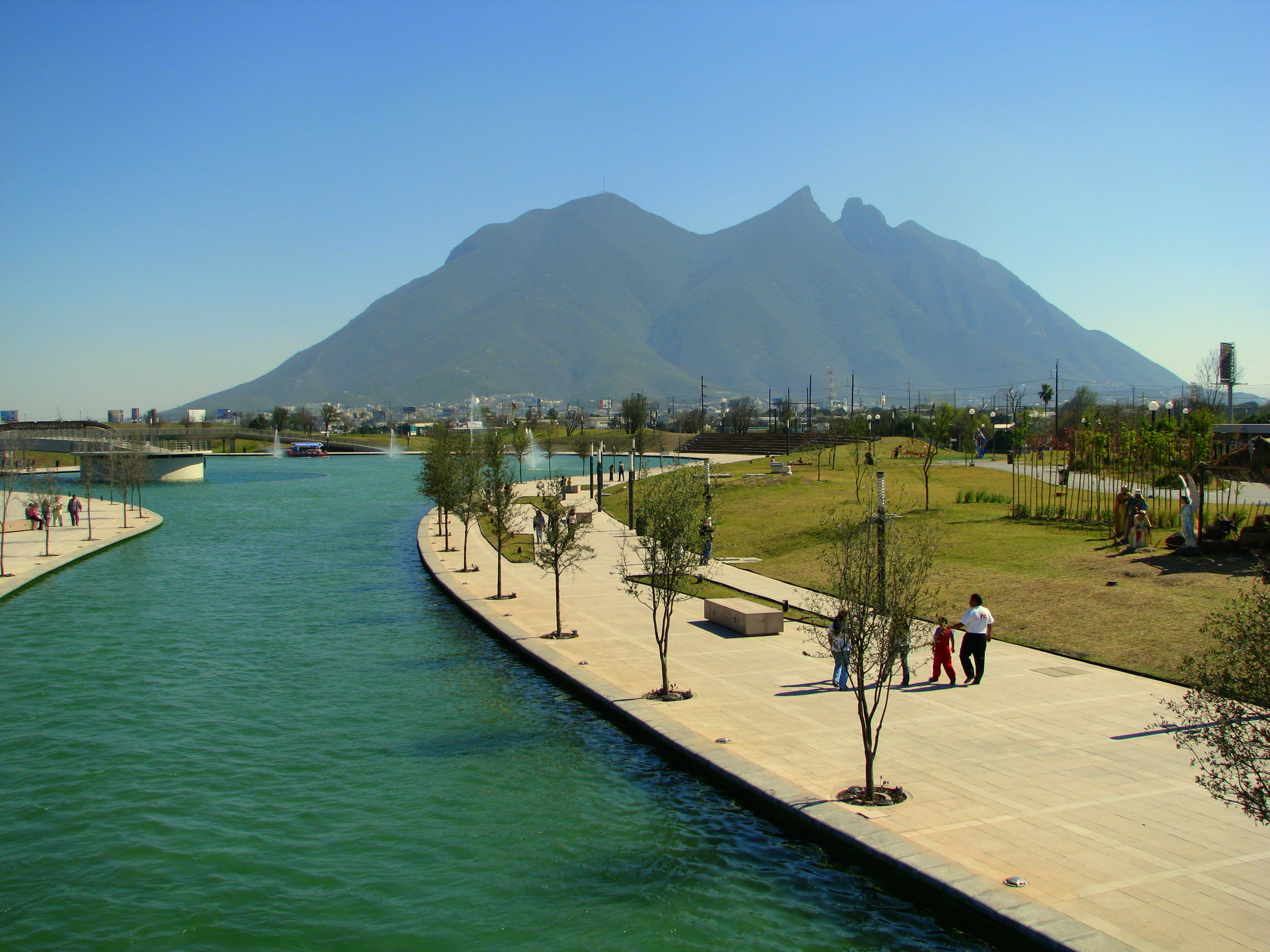
Santa Lucía artificial river over Fundidora Park

- The Santa Lucía artificial river, built between 1996 and 2007. It currently joins the Macroplaza with the Fundidora Park.
- The Cerro de la Silla (Saddle Mountain).
- The Macroplaza, the 8th largest city square in the world, is the cultural and administrative heart of the city featuring remarkable monuments, green areas and buildings. Its development was overseen by Ángela Alessio Robles in the 1980s.
- Faro del Comercio (Lighthouse of Commerce), another trademark of the city. This monument beams a green laser around the city at night.
- Barrio Antiguo (lit. Old neighborhood or old town) is the historical urban center of the city of Monterrey. There are preserved houses from the 17th, 18th and 19th centuries. Nowadays bars, cafes, art galleries and restaurants can be found there. In November of every year the Festival Cultural Barrio Antiguo takes place with national and international artists and performers. In recent years this festival has been replaced with the Festival Internacional de Santa Lucia, which now takes place in September.
- The Museum of Modern Art is a post-modern Mexican architecture designed by Ricardo Legorreta with the objective of creating different ambiances for artists and visitors from all around the world.
- Monterrey's Inukshuk is one of only a handful of authentic examples to be found outside Canada of these stone monuments from the high Arctic. The sculpture was created in situ by the Inuit artist Bill Nasogaluak in 2007 and was a gift to the state of Nuevo León from the Canadian Chamber of Commerce and the Government of Canada.
- Fundidora Park is a large urban park that contains old foundry buildings, 120 hectares of natural ambiance, artificial lakes, playgrounds, alternative cinema (Cineteca), museum (Photo Collection, the State Plastic Arts Collection, Exhibits and Spaces), hotel, auditorium and convention center.
- Puente de la Unidad (sometimes called Puente Atirantado) is a suspension bridge that crosses the Santa Catarina River and joins San Pedro Garza García with Monterrey.
- The Alfa Planetarium is the first IMAX dome built in Latin America and fourth in the world.
- The Government Palace of Nuevo León is a pink marble of Neoclassical architecture where the governor's office is located.
- El Cerro del Obispado (Bishopric Hill) which includes a public, scenic lookout called Mirador del Obispado, a Monumental flag and the museum inside the Palacio del Obispado (the Bishopric Palace).
- ITESM, ITESM has two distinctive buildings CEDES which houses the administration of the ITESM nationwide system and the CETEC which houses the main computer classroom and other offices.
- Cuauhtémoc Moctezuma Brewery (Cervecería Cuauhtémoc Moctezuma), with its 19th-century buildings and where the national Baseball Hall of Fame (Salón de la Fama) is located.
- The Cola de Caballo (Horse Tail) waterfall, on the mountains near the towns of Santiago and El Cercado, about 35 km (22 mi) south.
- On the way to the Cola de Caballo waterfall (Carretera Nacional going to Ciudad Victoria, Tamaulipas), in Santiago, the Presa Rodrigo Gomez or "La Boca" ("La Boca" Dam) lays nested between green hills.
- The Museum of Mexican History is the most representative and visited museum of the North of the Republic, fulfilling its purpose of spreading the historical content of the Mexican cultural heritage.
- LABNL Lab Cultural Ciudadano is a citizen laboratory located in the center of the city. This public space of collective creation develops projects for the common benefit of local communities.

=== Media ===
Monterrey is an important producer and broadcaster of media and entertainment in Mexico. Grupo Multimedios operates 4 television channels in the city, and XHAW-TDT is the flagship of the near-national network Canal 6, which also airs as a cable network in the United States. National broadcasting networks Televisa and Azteca have local stations for all of their major channels, along with the non-commercial broadcasters such as Once and Canal 22 networks. The state of Nuevo León and UANL also maintain television stations.

Grupo Reforma, one of the most widely read news sources in Mexico originated in the city with the newspaper El Norte. Milenio Diario de Monterrey, published by Grupo Multimedios, is another newspaper of high distribution, daily printing local editions in the most important Mexican cities. Other local newspapers include El Porvenir, El Horizonte, and ABC. Northern Mexico's weekly business newspaper Biznews is also headquartered in Monterrey.

Monterrey also has several radio stations broadcasting news, music, entertainment, and culture for the city. The main radio broadcasting groups are Multimedios Radio, Grupo Radio Alegría and Nucleo Radio Monterrey.

=== Sports ===
The city hosted eight matches during the 1986 FIFA World Cup and hosted four matches during the 2026 FIFA World Cup. The FINA World Junior Swimming Championships were held in Monterrey in the summer of 2008 at the University of Nuevo Leon (UANL), after the completion of a world-class and FINA-approved Aquatic Center. Also the city wanted to bid for the 2016 Summer Olympics, but the Mexican Olympic Committee refused to support it. Backed by a young people's movement, students of the universities of Monterrey formed the Monterrey 2014 Foundation with the purpose of hosting the 2014 Summer Youth Olympics. In 2009, the Mexican Olympic Committee gave the bid to Guadalajara which later on withdrew the bid late January 2010. Monterrey was bidding for the 2018 Summer Youth Olympics. Again, in February 2012, the Mexican Olympic Committee chose Guadalajara as a candidate for the 2018 Summer Youth Olympics, but was eliminated by the International Olympic Committee to advance to the final round. Since then, the Foundation Monterrey Olympic City A.C., the new name of this group of young citizens, worked on a project to bid for the 2023 Summer Youth Olympics.

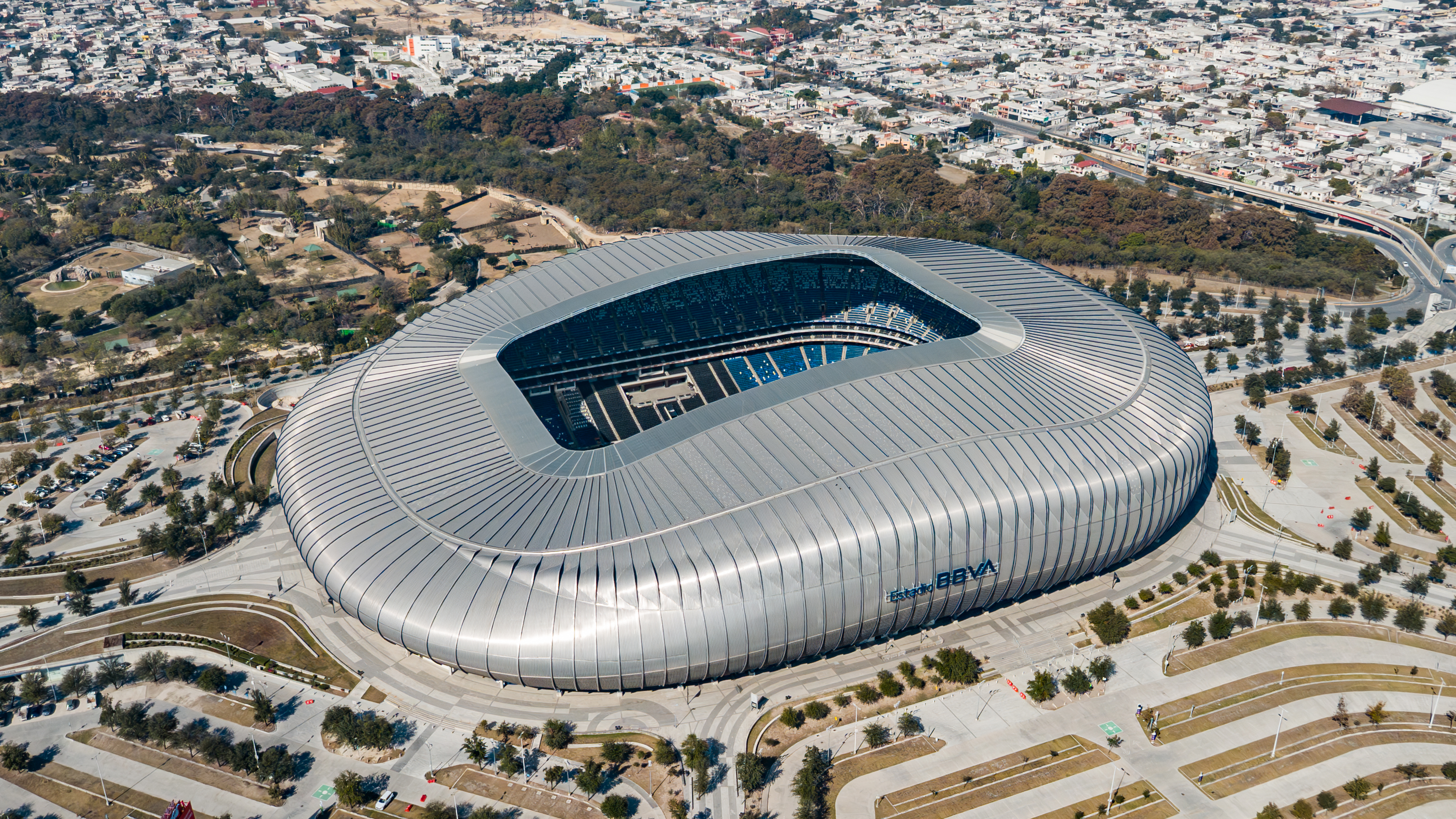
Estadio BBVA

Monterrey has two football teams in the Mexican league. The C.F. Monterrey, commonly known as the Rayados del Monterrey, uses the Estadio BBVA Bancomer, a facility sponsored by BBVA Bancomer and other important businesses. The Tigres UANL, owned by CEMEX, host matches at Estadio Universitario, on the main campus of the UANL. Both teams are related to the city on the derby, called Clásico Regiomontano. During the match, most of the city watches in bars, clubs, and family homes. It was proposed to build a stadium for both teams, the "Estadio Internacional Monterrey", but both teams rejected the idea. The project is still being promoted, but the UANL Tigres have yet to finish their stadium contract and the Rayados just inaugurated a new stadium of their own. Club de Fútbol Monterrey recently opened a new stadium with a capacity of 50,000. It was scheduled to be finished by 2014, named "Estadio de Fútbol Monterrey", but was inaugurated on August 2, 2015, in a match with Benfica. Rayados won, 3–0. Before the inauguration, the name was changed to Estadio BBVA Bancomer. It will remain the club's property for 50 years before becoming government property.

In addition, two professional indoor soccer teams were hosted in the past, the Monterrey La Raza, members of the Continental Indoor Soccer League and World Indoor Soccer League and the Monterrey Fury, members of the Major Indoor Soccer League. The city was awarded another franchise to begin play in the fall of 2007 in the MISL.

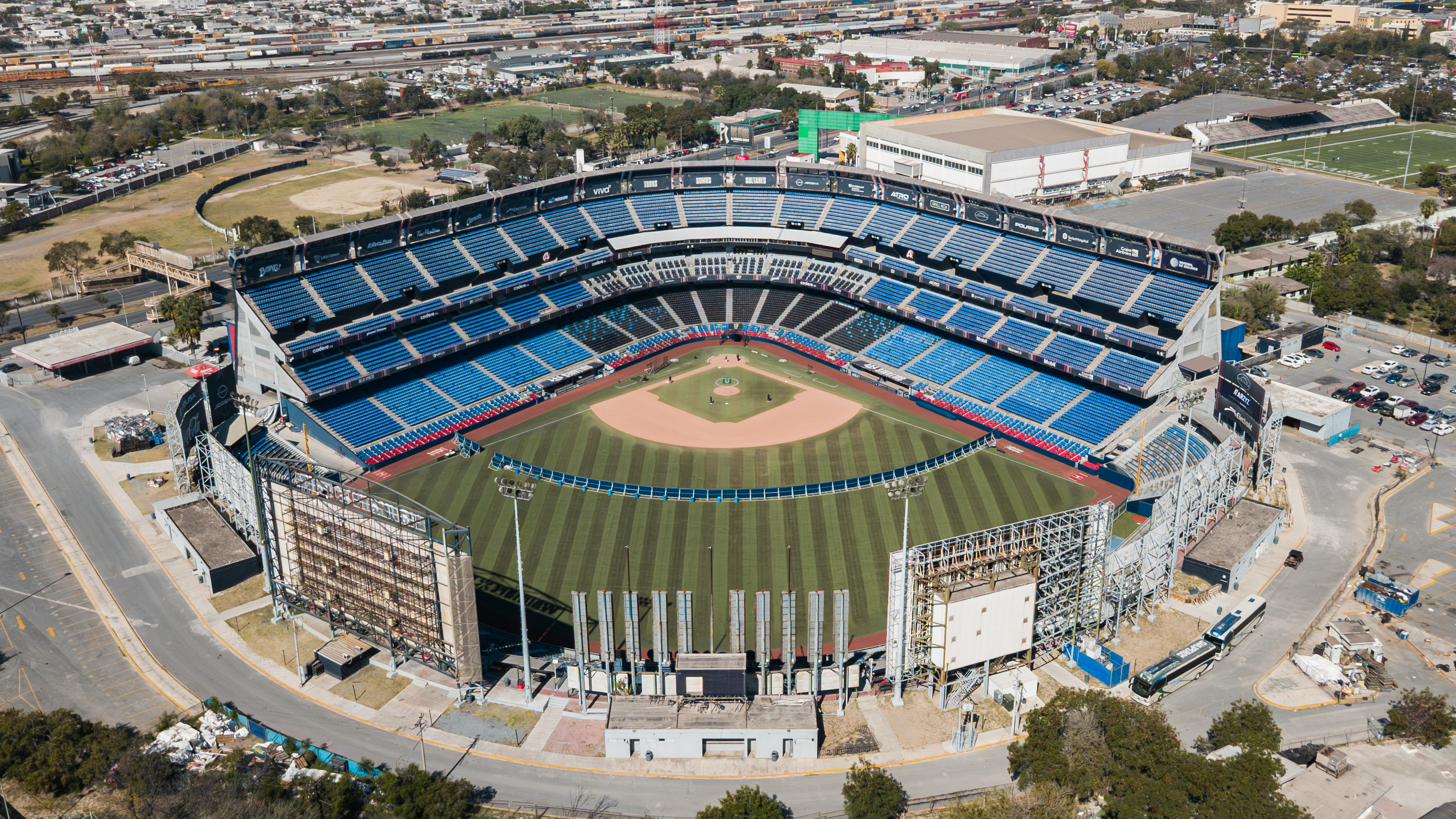
Estadio de Béisbol Monterrey

Baseball has a long history in the city, where it became the most popular sport during the early 20th century. Monterrey has been champion of the Little League World Series three times (1957, 1958 and 1997), and has been host of Major League Baseball games. The Sultanes de Monterrey are a Mexican League baseball team in the Northern Division. They have won the national title several times. The team was formed May 20, 1939, as Carta Blanca (a local beer brand, owned by Cuauhtémoc Moctezuma Brewery which owned the team). The team was also known as the gray ghosts. Soon, they became one of the most important teams in the league, winning its first championship in 1943. The Sultanes play in the Estadio de Béisbol Monterrey, the largest baseball stadium in Mexico. In 2003, the city unsuccessfully attempted to buy (and relocate to Monterrey) the Montreal Expos franchise of Major League Baseball.

There are two professional basketball teams: Fuerza Regia that plays in the national league, Liga Nacional de Baloncesto Profesional, and the Monterrey Venom that plays in the minor league American Basketball Association. Fuerza Regia used to play at the Monterrey Arena and now is doing this at Gimnasio Nuevo León while the Monterrey Poison plays at the gymnasium of the ITESM. The city has hosted the Champ Car race in Fundidora Park from 2001 to 2005 and hosted the A1 Grand Prix of Nations in February 2006.

In 2004, Monterrey hosted the World Karate Federation Senior World Championships. In April 2004, Monterrey's Arena Monterrey became the first city to host WWE in Mexico. In 2007, Monterrey hosted the Women's WTBA World Tenpin Bowling Championships. The city has two college American football teams, the Auténticos Tigres UANL and the Borregos Salvajes (ITESM) that play in the National College League (ONEFA). There is also a local children's league called AFAIM. People can also find golf, fishing, camping, and extreme-sports outdoors near the city (bungee jumping at Cola de Caballo, rock-climbing, hiking, mountain bike). In particular there is international-level rock-climbing places like la Huasteca, Potrero Chico and many other canyons.

Starting 2009 the Monterrey Open has been held at Monterrey. It is a professional women's tennis tournament affiliated with the Women's Tennis Association (WTA), and is part of the International tournaments on the WTA Tour. The Monterrey Open was also a golf tournament on the U.S.-based second tier professional Nike Tour, later named the Nationwide Tour and the Korn Ferry Tour, from 1993 to 2001. It was played at the Club Campestre in San Pedro Garza García, a suburb of Monterrey. In 2010, Monterrey hosted the International Ice Hockey Federation World U18 Championship at the Monterrey Ice Complex. Centauros Rugby Club Monterrey was founded in 2010 and is affiliated with the FMRU (Federacion Mexicana de Rugby).

== Twin towns – sister cities ==
Monterrey is twinned with:

- Barcelona, Spain (1992)
- Bethlehem, Palestine (1999)
- Bilbao, Spain (1993)
- Cape Town, South Africa (2016)
- Concepción, Chile (1997)
- Dallas, United States (1992)
- Guatemala City, Guatemala (1998)
- Hamilton, Canada (1993)
- Iași, Romania (1993)
- McAllen, United States (1999)
- Medellín, Colombia (1996)
- Monterrei, Spain (1999)
- Olongapo, Philippines (1993)
- Orlando, United States (2002)
- Rosario, Argentina (1993)
- San Antonio, United States (1953)
- San Salvador, El Salvador (1996)
- Shenyang, China (2015)
- Surabaya, Indonesia (2001)

== See also ==
- Symbols of Monterrey
- List of tallest buildings in Monterrey
