= Barrio Antiguo =

Historical quarter of Monterrey, Mexico

Coordinates: 25°40′0.64″N 100°18′25.45″W

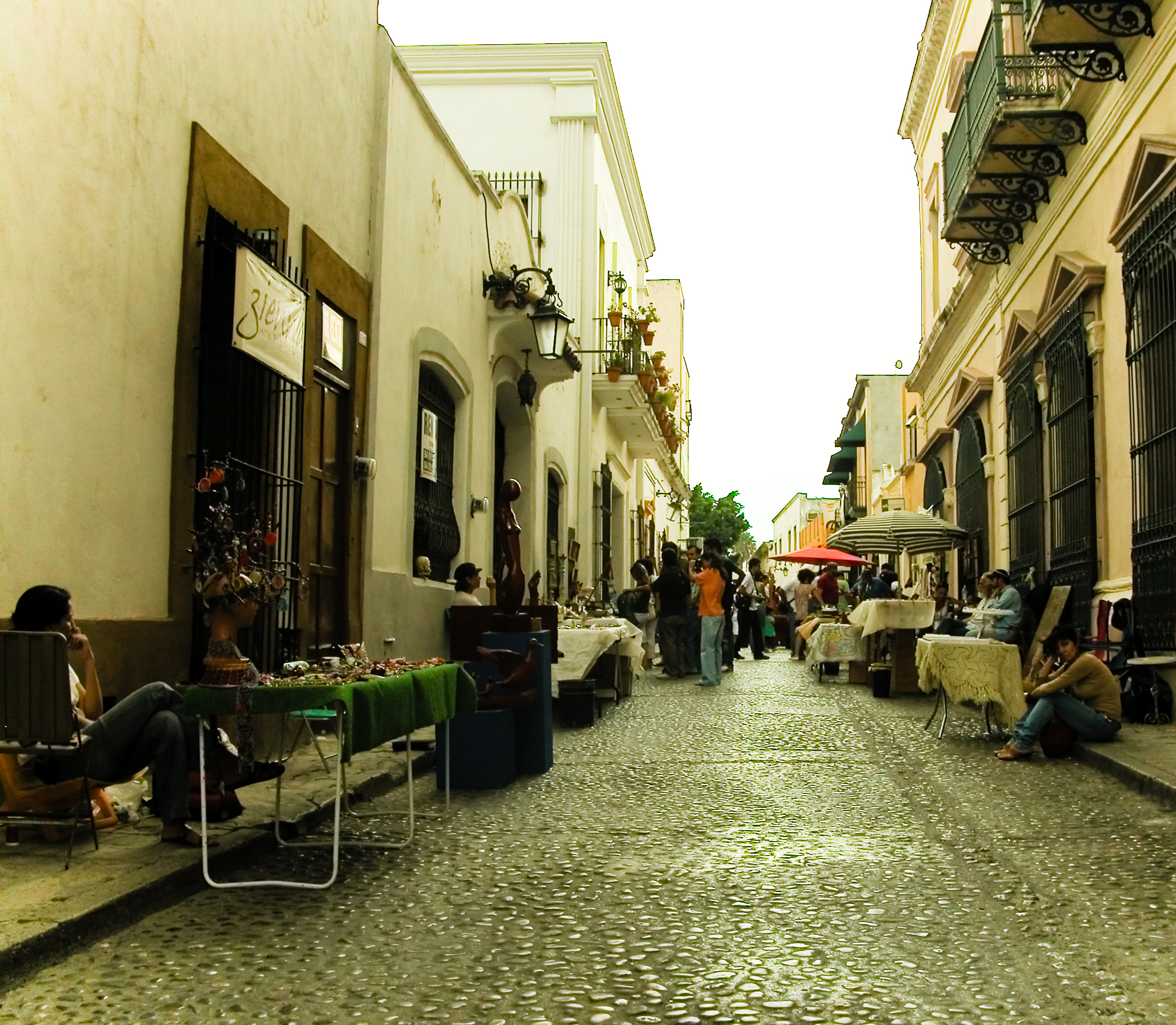
The "Callejón cultural" (Cultural Alleyway) at Mina Street in the Barrio Antiguo, which takes place every Sunday since 1992.

The Barrio Antiguo (Spanish old quarter) is the historical quarter of the city of Monterrey, Nuevo León, Mexico. It contains examples of Colonial era architecture. Comprising cobbled streets, the area is known for its nightlife, restaurants and bars. The area next to the Government Palace and the Macroplaza, it originally covered a larger space from the Santa Catarina River to 5 de Mayo Street, south to north, and from Mina Street to Roble Street (nowadays Avenida Benito Juárez), east to west. Most of the buildings now preserved are from the Spanish Colonial period and from the last years of the 19th century.

== History ==
Archaeologically speaking, the oldest Monterrey dates from the very founding of the city at the end of the sixteenth century. However, the buildings preserved today date mostly from the eighteenth century onwards. It used to be the commercial and cultural center of the city during the existence of the Viceroyalty of New Spain until recently the first half of the 20th century, when other parts of the city began to grow more to the detriment of the center. During the last decades of the 20th century there was a modern lifestyle in the Barrio Antiguo, characterized by the construction of hotels, museums, bars, discos and restaurants of international cuisine. Thus until depopulation and partial abandonment tended to decline from the 1990s to recent times, as currently there are projects under way for its restoration. Many houses of what used to be the Barrio Antiguo were demolished to give way to the construction of the Macroplaza (lit. big square) at the end of the past century. During the last decade of the twentieth century and recent years, Barrio Antiguo was well known as the center of the nightlife of Monterrey due to measures taken by the State in a failed attempt to create reforms that pushed the re-activation of the urban center.

In the past, the nightlife area was prone to incidents of violence and organised crime attacks.

From the year 2013 the government changed the way in which the Old Quarter was considered. A restoration project was started since then, which seeks to build a space for cultural recreation and preservation of the historic heritage, through the closure of some of its streets now pedestrianized (so far is the case of Calle Morelos) and re-activation Social or family business.
