= Symbols of Monterrey =

The symbols of the city of Monterrey, State of Nuevo León, Mexico, are the coat of arms or seal and the municipal flag.

== Coat of arms ==
Modern coat of arms of Monterrey

The municipal coat of arms is around an oval frame with a tree on the right and, next to it, an indigenous person shooting an arrow at a red sun that rises behind Cerro de la Silla. Two indigenous people, who were formerly known as the rayados, dressed in a huipil, loincloth, and headdress, armed with a bow and arrow, serve as a support for the whole, which appears on a white canvas, also cut in an oval shape divided into two threaded folds at the bottom, the upper ends of which fall backwards. At the bottom it has the motto CIUDAD DE MONTERREY and at the top it has a county crown.

Six white flags serve as a background, three on each side and falling over the military trophies, cannons, bullets, and drums. Below they have a gules band with the inscription of the name of the city, and the whole is topped with a count's crown with reference to the noble title of Gaspar de Zúñiga y Acevedo, Count of Monterrey, ninth viceroy of New Spain, in whose honor the city is named Monterrey City.

== Flag ==
Monterrey
- Use: Civil and state flag
- Proportion: 4:7

The unofficial flag of Monterrey consists of a white rectangle with a ratio of four to seven between the width and length; in the center it bears the State Coat of arms, placed in such a way that it occupies three-quarters of the width.

== See also ==
- List of Mexican municipal flags
- Monterrey
