= Galerías Valle Oriente =

Shopping mall in Monterrey, Mexico

Coordinates: 25.6380°N 100.3142°W

Galerías Valle Oriente is a shopping mall in Monterrey, Nuevo León, located in the limits with San Pedro Garza García, on Lazaro Cardenas Avenue, close to the Valle Oriente upscale development district. The mall takes its name from the district. It opened in April, 2003. The developer was Grupo U-Calli.

== Attractions ==
- Numerous full service restaurants, banks, clothing stores, and a catholic chapel.
- A Liverpool department store.
- IMAX screen and multiplex Cinépolis.
- A Soriana Híper hypermarket.
- A large food court.
- Adjacent to Walmart and Costco.
- KidZania Monterrey
