= Nuevo León =

State of Mexico

- State of Mexico
- Free and Sovereign State of Nuevo León; Estado Libre y Soberano de Nuevo León (Spanish)
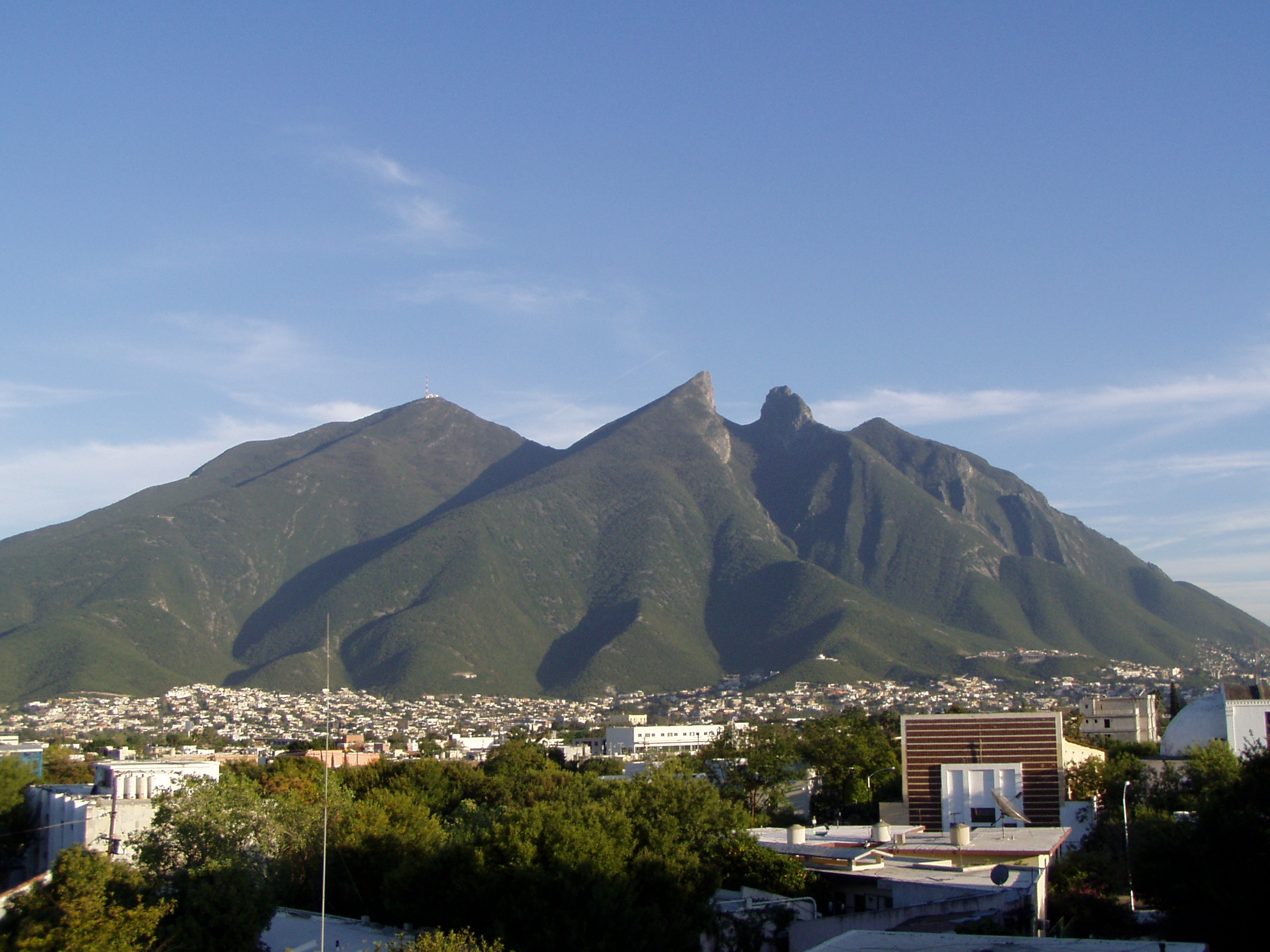
- The Cerro de la Silla in Monterrey

- Coat of arms
- Motto: Semper Ascendens (Always Ascending)
- Anthem: Himno de Nuevo León
- State of Nuevo León within Mexico
- Coordinates: 25°34′N 99°58′W
- Country: Mexico
- Capital and largest city: Monterrey
- Largest metro: Greater Monterrey
- Admission: 7 May 1824
- Order: 15th

Government
  - Governor: Samuel García Sepúlveda (Citizens' Movement)
  - Senators: Waldo Fernández González (Ecologist Green Party); Blanca Judith Díaz Delgado (Morena; Luis Donaldo Colosio Riojas (Citizens' Movement)
  - Deputies: Federal deputies: 01: Homero Ricardo Niño de Rivera Vela; 02: Andrés Cantú Ramírez; 03: Clara Luz Flores Carrales; 04: Amparo Lilia Olivares Castañeda; 05: Santiago González Soto; 06: Annia Sarahí Gómez Cárdenas; 07: Carlos Alberto Guevara Garza; 08: Adriana Belinda Quiroz Gallegos; 09: Juan Francisco Espinoza Eguia; 10: Ana Isabel González González; 11: Pedro Garza Treviño; 12: Héctor Alfonso de la Garza Villarreal; 13: Luis Orlando Quiroga Treviño; 14: José Gloria López

Area
  - Total: 64,156 km^{2} (24,771 sq mi)
- Ranked 13th
- Highest elevation (Cerro Potosí): 3,710 m (12,170 ft)

Population (2020)
  - Total: 5,784,442
  - Rank: 7th
  - Density: 90.162/km^{2} (233.52/sq mi)
  - Rank: 14th
- Demonym: Neoleonés

GDP
  - Total (PPP): US$290.5 billion (2024)
  - Per capita (PPP): US$50,226 (2024)
  - Rank: 3rd
- Time zone: UTC−06:00 (Zona Centro)
  - Summer (DST): UTC–05:00 (DST)
- Postal code: 64–67
- Area code: Area codes: • 1; • 2; • 3
- ISO 3166 code: MX-NLE
- HDI: ▲0.857 very high Ranked 2nd of 32
- Website: Official Web Site

Nuevo León, (Note: Spanish: [ˈnweβo leˈon]; 'New León') officially the Free and Sovereign State of Nuevo León, (Note: Spanish: Estado Libre y Soberano de Nuevo León) is a state in northeastern Mexico. The state borders the Mexican states of Tamaulipas, Coahuila, Zacatecas, and San Luis Potosi, and has an extremely narrow international border with the U.S. state of Texas. Covering 64,156 square kilometers (24,771 square miles) and with a population of 5.78 million people, Nuevo León is the thirteenth-largest federal entity by area and the seventh-most populous as of 2020.

Monterrey is the state capital and most populous city of Nuevo León and the ninth-largest in Mexico. Monterrey is part of the Monterrey metropolitan area, the second-largest metropolitan area in the country with an estimated population of 5.3 million people in 2020. About 92% of the state's population lives in the metropolitan area, making Monterrey the most extreme primate city of a Mexican state.

Prior to European colonization, Nuevo León was home to various nomadic groups, known as chichimecas to the Spaniards. Stemming from Luis Carvajal y de la Cueva's expedition in 1580, the New Kingdom of León was established, encompassing present-day Coahuila, Nuevo León, Tamaulipas, and Texas, but permanent settlement did not occur until 1596. In 1824, Nuevo León became a state of Mexico following the country's successful war for independence. The state began industrializing in the late 19th century and early 20th century, establishing various large companies, which accelerated after the Mexican Revolution. Today, Nuevo León is a major manufacturing hub with one of Mexico's largest economies.

== Etymology ==
The origins of Nuevo León's name can be traced back to the late-16th century, when Spanish explorer Luis Carvajal y de la Cueva named the region the New Kingdom of León, in honor of the Kingdom of León, as Carvajal noted various similarities between both territories, particularly their mountainous terrains. Following Mexican independence, the name was shortened to Nuevo León.

== History ==
=== Prehispanic history ===
Prior to European colonization, there was no established nation-state. Historians estimate that there were about 250 distinct indigenous nomad groups living in the state's territory, collectively known to the Spaniards as chicimecas. Archaeological remains, such as cave paintings and carved stones, enabled historians to identify four main indigenous groups that inhabited the state: the Coahuiltecans to the west, Alazapas to the north, the "Borrados" to the east, and the Guachichiles to the south.

Like numerous groups across Aridoamerica, the indigenous peoples of Nuevo León were constantly on the move in search for food. Predominantly reliant on hunting and gathering, many peoples traveled in small bands, establishing temporary settlements known as rancherías, which typically housed one or two families. These settlements consisted of semispherical huts constructed from interwoven branches and thatched roofs. Those situated near rivers, such as the Salinas river, or in regions with more temperate climates, like areas near or within the Sierra Madre Oriental mountain range, had access to fishing and limited agriculture.

Due to their nomadic lifestyle, the communities never laid claim to land permanently, and they did not develop political hierarchies similar to the ones found in Mesoamerican societies. Consequently, governance within these tribes was absent, reflecting a decentralized social structure.

=== Colonial period ===
In 1535, Alvaro Núñez Cabeza de Vaca led one of the first expeditions into Nuevo León territory. Colonization attempts began in 1577 under Alberto del Canto, who founded Santa Lucía in present-day Monterrey. However, these efforts failed due to indigenous raids, who were labeled as Indios Bárbaros by the colonizers. In 1579, Luis Carvajal y de la Cueva, a member of del Canto's expedition, returned to Spain and negotiated with King Philip II to establish a new territory in northern New Spain. He returned to the territory in 1580 and founded the New Kingdom of León in 1582, with its capital, San Luis Rey de Francia, established where Santa Lucía once stood, marking Monterrey's second founding. However, colonization efforts failed once again in 1588, when Carvajal was reported to the Inquisition, accused of being a descendant of New Christians. Since then, the region remained mostly uninhabited by the Spaniards.

In 1596, Diego de Montemayor, accompanied by twelve families, sought to repopulate the New Kingdom of León. On 20 September, he established the Ciudad Metropolitana de Nuestra Señora de Monterrey, marking Monterrey's third and definitive founding. During this period, despite the majority of the population being concentrated in Monterrey, the town remained small and isolated from other important towns like Saltillo and Zacatecas. Life for the early inhabitants was marked by poverty, with agriculture and livestock farming being the primary occupations, focused solely on self-consumption. The establishment of Spanish settlements in the northern part of the territory were hindered by Coahuiltecan attacks, mostly in response to Spanish slave raids on the natives.

Evangelization served as a key instrument of Spanish colonization and cultural assimilation, with numerous friars arriving in the New Kingdom of León during the 17th and 18th centuries to convert the natives. In 1602, the first Franciscan convent in Monterrey was established, named the convent of San Andrés. Throughout the colonial period, a total of twenty missions were established, of which ten are present-day municipalities of Nuevo León, including Salinas Victoria (Mission Guadalupe de las Salinas), Agualeguas (Mission Nuestra Señora de Agualeguas), and Guadalupe (Mission Valle de Nuestra Señora de Guadalupe), among others. Some missions failed due to the natives' resistance or deadly diseases spread by the Spaniards, while others thrived with Tlaxcalan reinforcement.

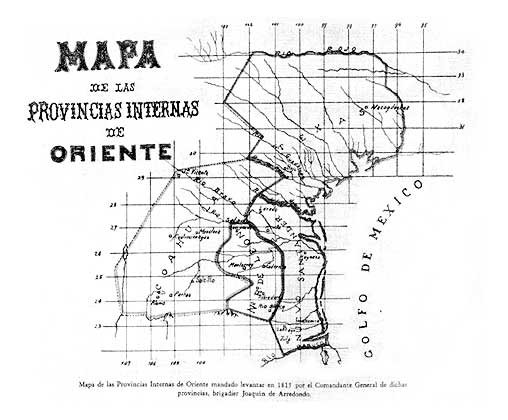
The Provincias Internas in 1815, showing the territory of Coahuila, the New Kingdom of León, Nuevo Santander, and Texas.

The New Kingdom of León asserted claims over regions in present-day Coahuila, Nuevo León, Tamaulipas, and Texas. However, throughout the 17th and 18th centuries, the province experienced territorial losses. In 1643, a successful lawsuit brought to the Royal Audiencia of Guadalajara by the governor of Nueva Vizcaya removed the New Kingdom of León's jurisdiction over Coahuila and Texas, with the case citing Carvajal's illegal attempts to invade territories belonging to Nueva Vizcaya in the 1580s. The second loss was caused by pressure from the French incursions in Louisiana and requests from the New Kingdom of León to colonize the northeastern Mexican coast in order to pacify and convert its natives, prompting the Viceroy of New Spain to reorganize the New Kingdom of León, which established Nuevo Santander, resulting in the loss of present-day Tamaulipas.

During the establishment of the Provincias Internas, the New Kingdom of León became part of the Eastern Internal Provinces, alongside the provinces of Coahuila, Nuevo Santander, and Texas.

=== Mexican War of Independence ===
On 16 September 1810, the Cry of Dolores occurred, signaling the start of Mexican War of Independence. However, it took until 29 September for news of this event to reach the New Kingdom of León due to its geographical isolation from the rest of New Spain. Initially, Governor Manuel de Santa María prepared to defend the territory against the rebellion. However, following the royalist defeat at the Battle of Aguanueva and the advance of insurgent General José Mariano Jiménez into the region, Santa María changed his allegiance. On 17 January 1811, the governor officially proclaimed the insurgency in Monterrey. Jiménez entered Monterrey on 26 January to spread the movement throughout the Eastern Internal Provinces. Despite these efforts, various counter-insurgency movements emerged in the territories, leading to the capture of key figures at the Wells of Baján in Coahuila.

Following the capture and execution of the insurgent leadership, the New Kingdom of León fell under fierce royalist control. This counter-insurgency was spearheaded by Joaquín de Arredondo, commandant of the Eastern Internal Provinces. However, the movement encountered ongoing guerrilla resistance in rural areas throughout the decade. The conflict exacted a heavy toll on the region; municipalities like Vallecillo, Sabinas Hidalgo, Cadereyta, and Salinas Victoria were severely depopulated as locals either joined the insurgent militias or died in bloody skirmishes. In July 1813, a rebel force composed of indigenous groups, seminarians, and local criollos unsuccessfully attempted to capture Monterrey and were subsequently executed in the city's center.

Ultimately, the broader independence movement struggled to gain a massive foothold among the urban population of the territory, as many remained royalists. Some attribute this to the region's stronger ties to Spain and its high proportion of people of white or criollo ancestry, constituting 63% of the population according to the Revillagigedo census of 1790. The council of Monterrey, which was the capital and biggest city of the New Kingdom of León, remained loyal to Spain until Joaquín de Arredondo endorsed the Plan of Iguala on 3 July 1821.

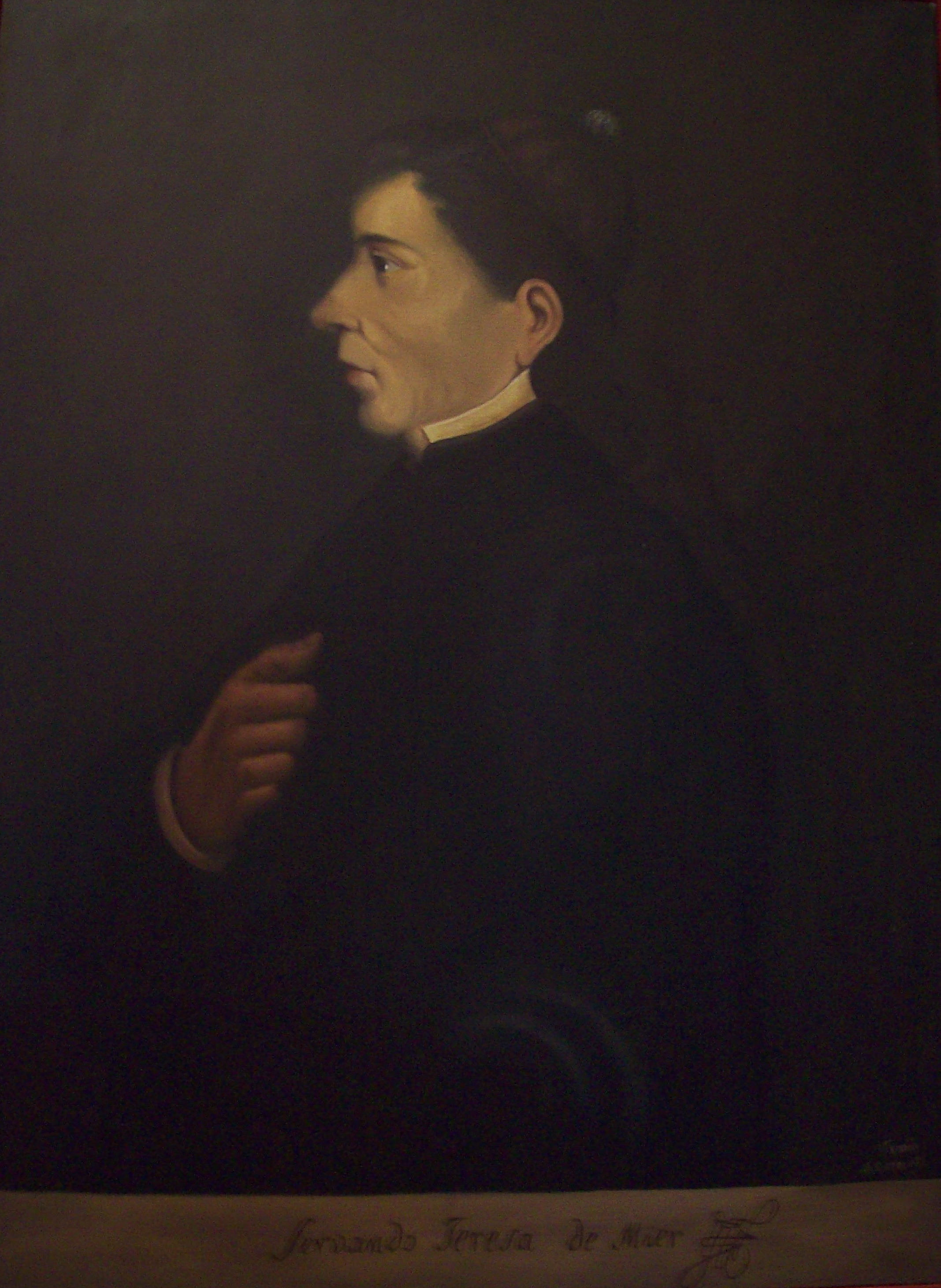
Portrait of Servando Teresa de Mier

After independence, Servando Teresa de Mier represented the former New Kingdom of León in the constituent congress that drafted the Mexican Constitution of 1824. During this period, the Constitutive Acts of the Mexican Federation contemplated the formation of the State of the Internal East, comprising Nuevo León, Coahuila, and Texas, as part of broader debates over the political organization of the eastern provinces, in which Miguel Ramos Arizpe, representing Coahuila, favored maintaining a unified entity while Mier supported separate statehood. The proposal for a unified entity was soon abandoned due to concerns that its vast size, sparse population, and administrative difficulties could encourage separatism, and on 7 May 1824 Nuevo León was formally constituted as a state within the federation. A local legislature was subsequently elected in June and began sessions in August of that year, leading to the drafting and promulgation of the state's first constitution on 5 March 1825.

=== Independence to late 19th century ===
Once the federal system was established, internal divisions between federalist and centralist factions emerged, eventually leading to the enactment of Las Siete Leyes in 1835, which dissolved the federal structure, replacing the state of Nuevo León with a department. In response to these centralist policies, a secessionist movement arose, resulting in the establishment of the Republic of the Rio Grande in 1840. This unrecognized republic encompassed the territories of Coahuila, Nuevo León, Tamaulipas, and parts of southern Texas, with its capital in Laredo, Texas. However, after a defeat in the Battle of Saltillo, the insurgency ended. By August 1846, the restoration of the 1824 Mexican Constitution reinstated statehood to Nuevo León.

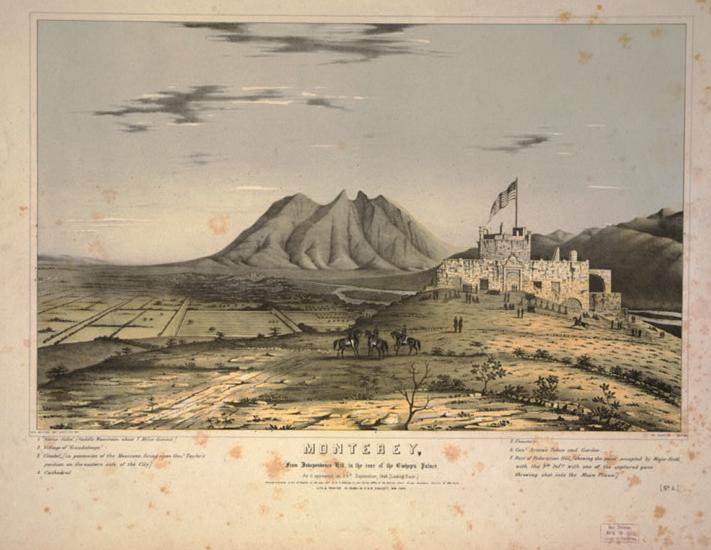
Monterrey from Independence Hill, in the rear of the Bishop´s Palace. On stone by F. Swington, colored by G. & W. Edicott, New York, 1847. Depiction of Monterrey under U.S. occupation.

On 21 September 1846, during the Mexican-American War, the Battle of Monterrey was fought, a three-day assault on Nuevo León's capital by U.S. forces. The Mexican forces, commanded by Pedro de Ampudia, faced off against the U.S. troops led by Zachary Taylor, whose objective was to take the city in order to advance toward Mexico City. The battle inflicted heavy casualties on both sides. By 24 September, a truce was brokered between the opposing generals, stipulating a two-month armistice and the withdrawal of Mexican forces from the city in exchange for its surrender. The state remained under U.S. occupation until 18 June 1848.

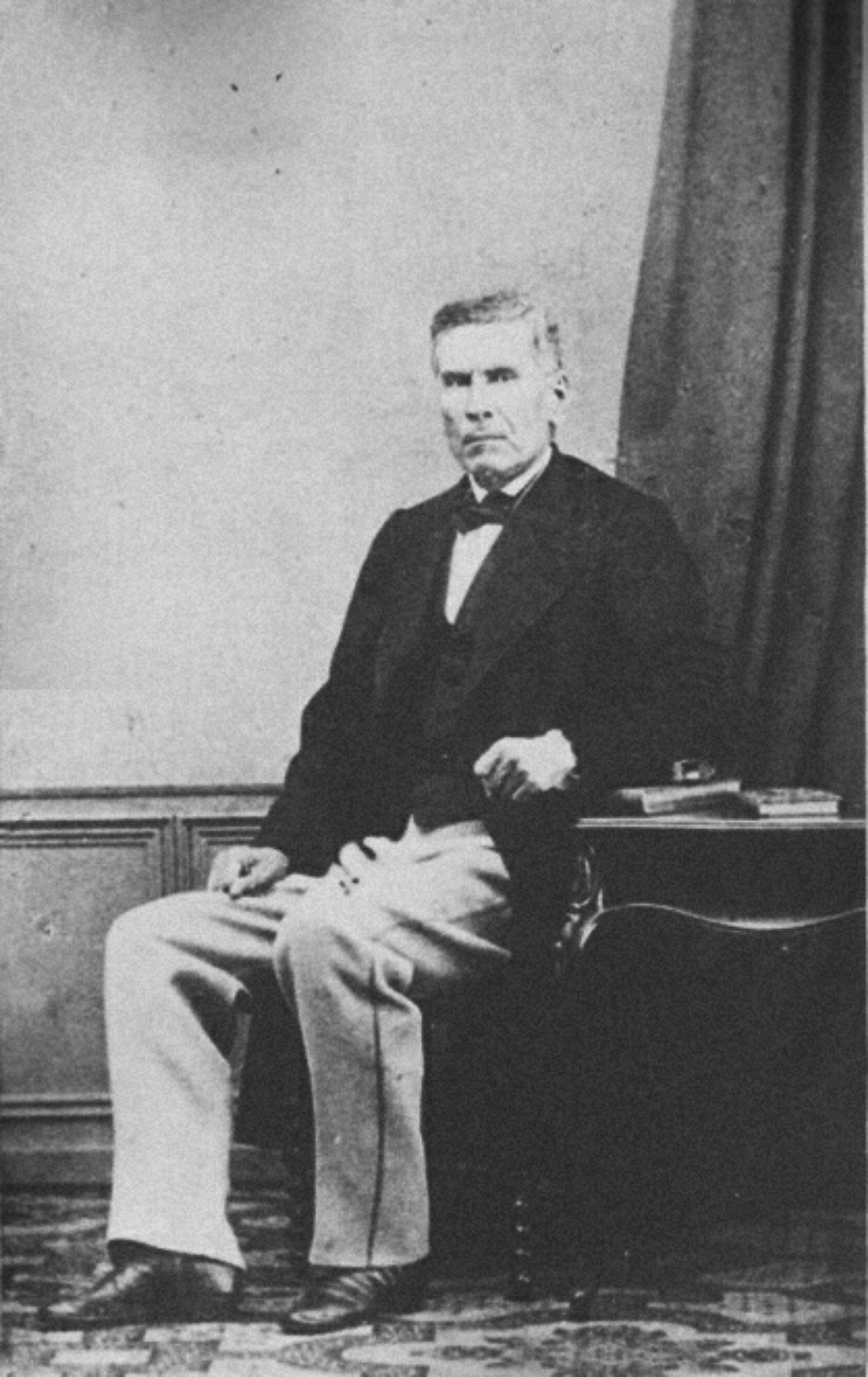
Santiago Vidaurri, governor of Nuevo León and Coahuila (1855–1864)

In 1855, Santiago Vidaurri seized control of the Nuevo León government in order to aid in the execution of the Plan of Ayutla, later supplying military assistance to the Liberals during the Reform War. As a means of consolidating power in northeastern Mexico, in 1856, Vidaurri unilaterally announced the annexation of Coahuila, forming the state of Nuevo León and Coahuila, which was later ratified into the 1857 Mexican Constitution after a referendum approved the annexation.

The annexation provided the state government with control over a significant portion of the customhouses along the US-Mexico border. Leveraging the increased revenues, Vidaurri invested in state development initiatives, including public gardens, Plaza de la Llave, and the Teatro del Progreso, which was the first theater in the state. Additionally, he used the money to pursue campaigns against the Lipan Apache people. Revenues increased further during the American Civil War, as the Confederacy traded cotton through Nuevo León and Coahuila due to the Union blockade of their ports.

On 14 February 1864, during the French intervention in Mexico, Benito Juárez visited Vidaurri to request revenue from the state's customshouses, but Vidaurri refused, suggesting a referendum to join the Second Mexican Empire instead. In retaliation, Juárez labeled Vidaurri a traitor and divided Nuevo León and Coahuila, reinstating them as separate states. Juárez led the republic's remnants from Nuevo León until 15 August 1864, when the approaching French forces forced him to relocate. In 1865, the empire dissolved Mexico's federal structure, reorganizing Nuevo León as a department, with the territory regaining its statehood upon the republic's restoration in 1867.

=== Industrialization and Mexican Revolution ===
During the Porfiriato, Bernardo Reyes was sent to Nuevo León by Porfirio Díaz, where Reyes was governor from 1885 to 1887 and from 1889 to 1909. Reyes suppressed small insurrections and banditry in multiple municipalities while also starting infrastructure projects, such as the State Penitentiary, the construction of the Government Palace, and the renovation of numerous plazas and markets. Additionally, in 1892, Reyes negotiated a land swap with Coahuila so that Nuevo León had access to the international border with Texas.

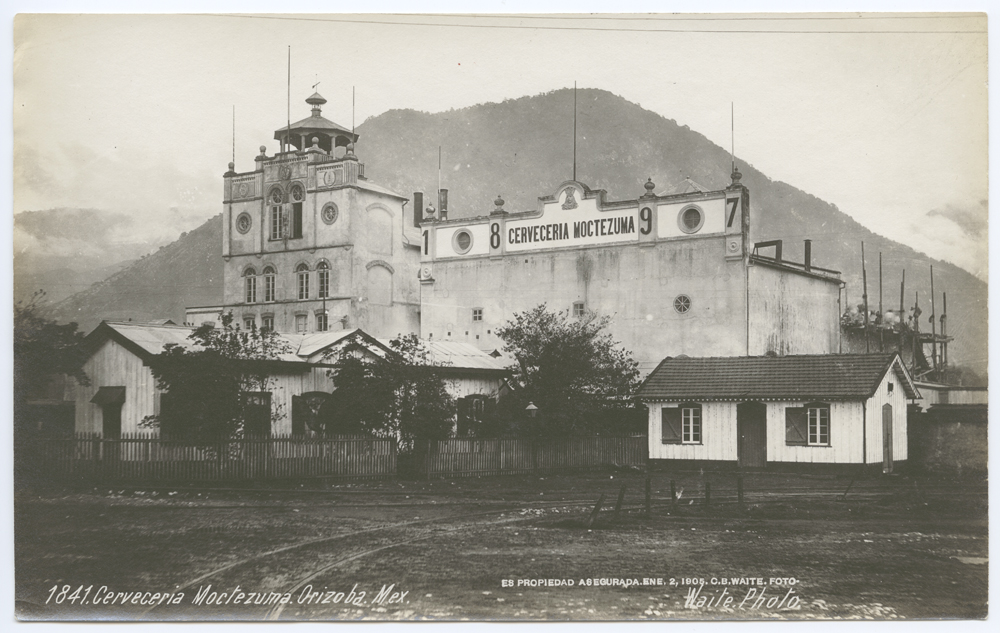
Due to the vertical integration of Moctezuma Brewery (pictured), various other companies, such as Vidrios y Cristales de Monterrey, were established in the state.

Reyes' policies rapidly industrialized the state, overseeing the establishment of significant companies, including Cuauhtémoc brewery, later known as Cuauhtémoc Moctezuma Brewery, in 1900; Monterrey Foundry, now Fundidora Park, in 1904; Cementos Hidalgo, later known as Cemex, in 1905; and Vidrios y Cristales de Monterrey, later known as Vitro, in 1909.

In 1909, the deadliest hurricane in the state's history struck, resulting in around 3,000 deaths in Monterrey and at least $50 million (1909 USD; $1.79 billion 2026 USD) in damages.

During the Mexican Revolution, Monterrey witnessed multiple attempts to seize control by different factions. In October 1913, Carrancista forces initially succeeded in seizing key locations such as the Obispado and a barracks, but faced strong Federal resistance while advancing towards the city center, retreating the next day. In April 1914, after a prolonged conflict, Carrancistas captured the city center, installing Antonio Villarreal, a radical liberal, as governor, who implemented controversial measures like expelling foreign priests, demolishing temples, and destroying religious images. Villista forces briefly captured Monterrey in early 1915, with Pancho Villa visiting Monterrey for fundraising efforts. By May 1915, Carrancistas regained control and installed Idelfonso Vázquez as interim governor.

=== 1930s–present ===
For the rest of the 20th century, Nuevo León's economy underwent continued industrialization. Major families, holding majority shares in the state's largest companies, such as the Cuauhtémoc brewery, Monterrey Foundry, and Cementos Hidalgo, strategically reinvested their profits into diverse sectors, aiding in the expansion of both the industrial and banking sectors. By the 1980s, 91% of the employed population was in the secondary and tertiary sectors.

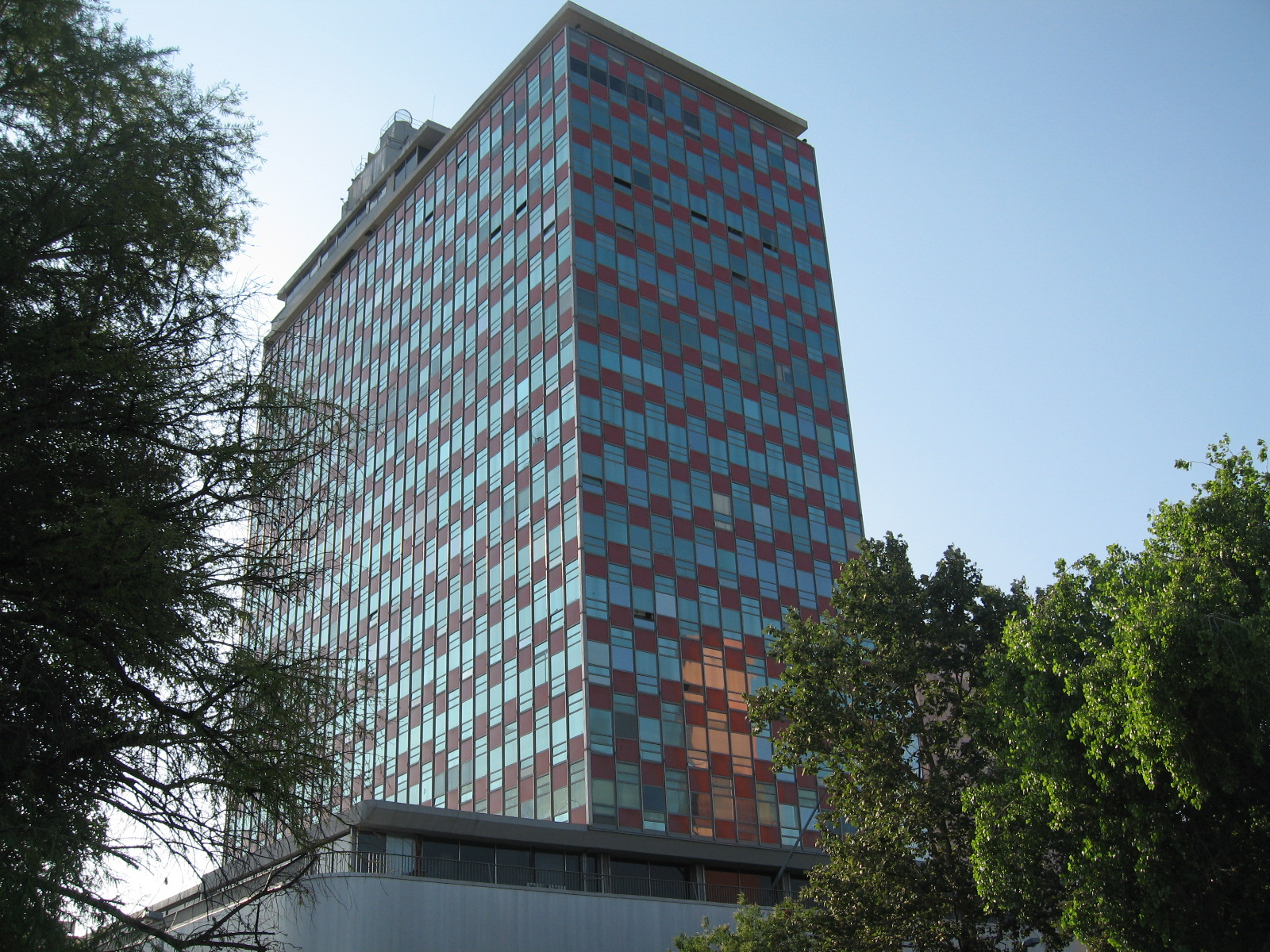
Condominios Acero, the first high-rise in Nuevo León, was built due to increased demand for office space.

The industrial surge led to remarkable population growth, soaring from 417,491 in 1930 to 3,098,736 in 1990. Monterrey's urban sprawl surpassed city limits by the 1970s, extending into adjacent municipalities like Guadalupe, San Pedro Garza García, Santa Catarina, San Nicolás, General Escobedo, and Apodaca. The 1960s witnessed the construction of the state's first high-rise, Condominios Acero. The state's first shopping mall, Galerías Monterrey, was founded in 1983, resulting in the development of numerous shopping complexes throughout the region, such as Plaza Fiesta San Agustín in 1988. To meet the population's urban transport needs, the government inaugurated Metrorrey, Monterrey's light rapid transit system, in 1991.

In 1994, the signing of the North American Free Trade Agreement cemented Nuevo León's position as a manufacturing hub with an export-oriented economy, capitalizing on its close proximity to the United States to export goods. Taking advantage of its small border with Texas, Colombia, Nuevo León was founded as a port of entry. By the end of the 20th century, the absolute political dominance of the Institutional Revolutionary Party, which had started in 1929, began to wane, resulting in the election of Fernando Canales Clariond of the National Action Party as governor in 1997.

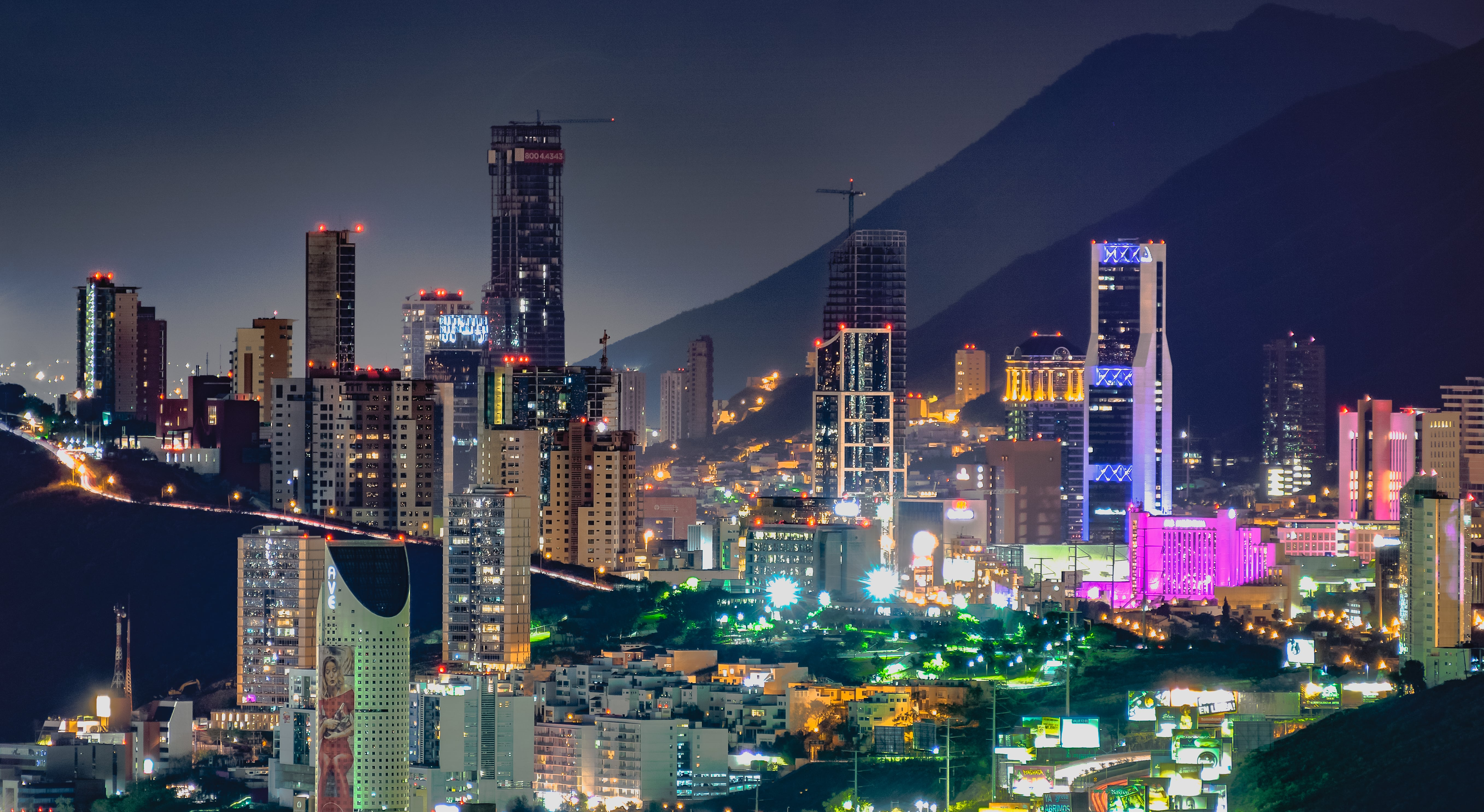
Monterrey skyline marked by various skyscrapers in the 2010s.

The early 21st century saw continued growth, with a population of 5,784,442 by 2020. The process of verticalization in Greater Monterrey intensified, marked by the construction of increasingly numerous and taller skyscrapers, notably Torre Avalanz, Torre KOI, and Torres Obispado, among others. By the late 2010s and 2020s, the state was experiencing a nearshoring boom, characterized by significant foreign investment from automotive companies like Kia and Tesla. However, due to the rapid industrialization and urbanization, the state faced environmental concerns, such as poor air quality and water shortages, the latter caused by droughts.

The Mexican drug war led to a significant decline in security within the state, marked by several massacres during the war's initial phases, notable examples being the 2011 Monterrey casino attack and the Cadereyta Jiménez massacre.

== Geography ==
Covering an area of 64,156 square kilometers (24,771 square miles), Nuevo León ranks as the 13th largest federal entity by size in Mexico. The state is located in the northeastern part of Mexico and is bordered by Tamaulipas to the east, Coahuila to the west, both Zacatecas and San Luis Potosi to the south, and the U.S. state of Texas to the north. The state boasts a diverse geography, encompassing three key physiographic provinces in the northeast region.

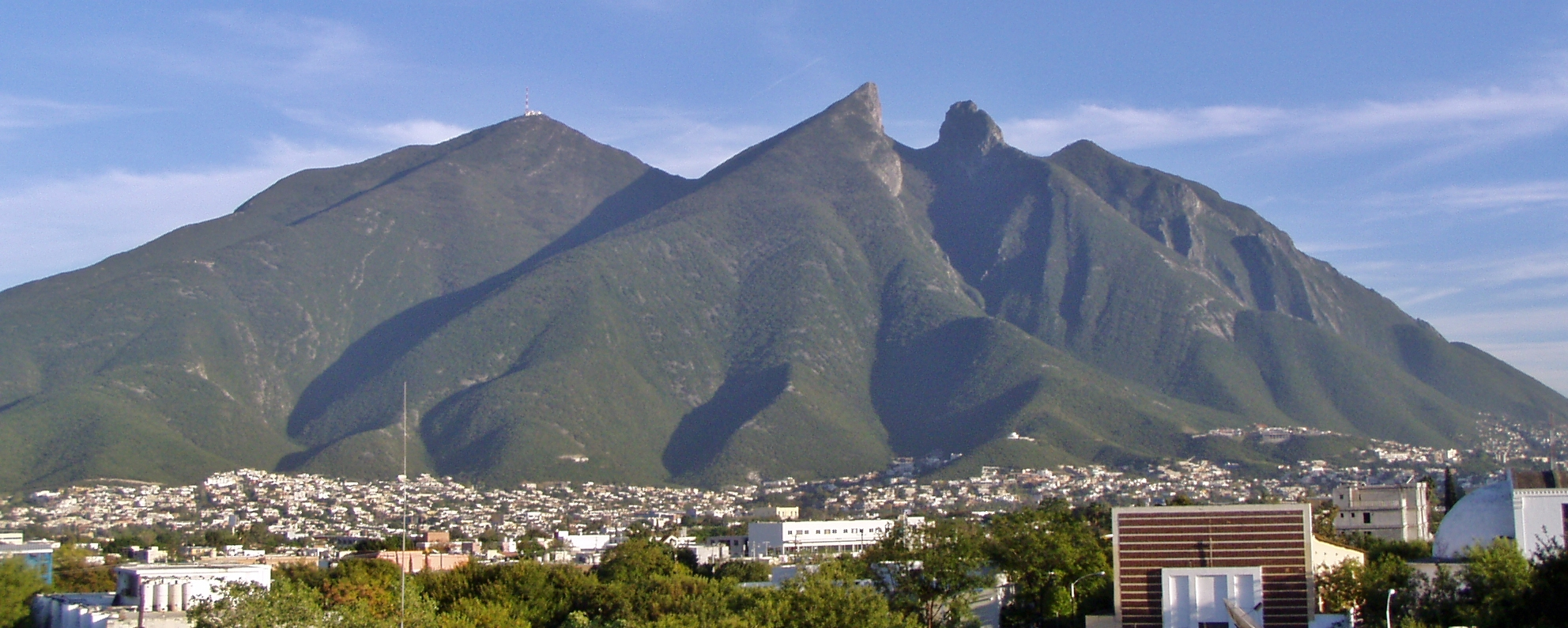
The Cerro de la Silla, a well-known symbol of the state, is part of the Sierra Madre Oriental mountain range.

The state's southern and western scenery is dominated by the Sierra Madre Oriental mountain range, covering 50.9% of the state's territory. Notable features formed by the mountain range include the Galeana and Doctor Arroyo plateaus, the Iguana, Picachos, Papagayos, and Santa Clara mountain ranges, and the Pilón, Ascensión, and Río Blanco valleys. Cerro Potosí, which is the state's highest elevation at 3,710 meters above sea level, is part of the mountain range.

The Great Plains is considered to start in the northernmost regions of Nuevo León, constituting 34.6% of the state's land. This area is characterized by gentle hills along the Rio Grande. In the east, the Northern Gulf Coastal Plains cover 14.5% of the state, featuring low-altitude lands classified as an "inclined plain" due to the alluvial terrain.

The San Juan River, one of the Rio Grande's major tributaries, is one of the most important rivers in the state, as it supplies the El Cuchillo reservoir, which in turn provides water for the Monterrey metropolitan area. It is fed by many of its own tributaries, such as the Pesquería River and the Santa Catarina River, with the latter flowing through the metropolitan area.

The state also houses additional reservoirs to provide water to its residents. Among the significant ones are the Cerro Prieto, La Boca, Agualeguas, Sombreretillo, El Porvenir, and Loma Larga reservoirs.

=== Climate ===
Nuevo León is located at the intersection of various climate zones: hot desert, hot semi-arid, cold semi-arid, and humid subtropical climates. The majority of the state, including most of the Monterrey metropolitan area, has a hot semi-arid climate, while the northern part of the state has a hot desert climate due to its proximity to the Chihuahuan Desert. Some southern portions of the state have a humid subtropical climate due to the Sierra Madre Oriental mountain range.

The state typically encounters arid, hot summers, with peak temperatures in the hottest regions soaring to 47 °C. As summer progresses, the climate transitions into a wet season, primarily observed in August and September. During these periods of increased rainfall, the temperature drops significantly, leading to below-average temperatures. The state experiences mild winters with average high temperatures around 21 °C and lows around 8 °C. Notably, regions in or near the mountain ranges have relatively low mean temperatures during the winter months, and may experience occasional light snowfall.

While snowfall is a rare occurrence in the entire state, it has been documented during winter storms and cold fronts. One notable event happened on 9 January 1967, when 50 cm of snow fell within an eight-hour period. Additional instances of snowfall in the state include a February 1895 winter storm during the Great Freeze, the 2004 Christmas Eve winter storm, and the February 2021 North American winter storm.

==== Tropical cyclones ====
While rare, hurricanes and tropical storms can impact Nuevo León, bringing high levels of rainfall to the state. The increased precipitation often results in the overflow of the state's rivers, most notably the Santa Catarina River, leading to fatalities and significant damage to urban infrastructure. Notable examples of this include the 1909 Monterrey hurricane, causing about 3,000 fatalities in Monterrey; Hurricane Gilbert in 1988 with approximately 150 fatalities; and Hurricane Alex in 2010, which caused 15 deaths. Additional storms that have impacted the state have been Tropical Storm Fernand in 2019 and Hurricane Hanna in 2020.

Monterrey

Climate chart (precipitation, max. and min. temperature)
J	F	M	A	M	J	J	A	S	O	N	D
15 20 10	16 22 12	18 27 15	29 30 18	43 32 22	64 34 23	54 35 24	62 35 24	133 32 22	72 28 18	26 24 14	16 21 11
- █ Average max. and min. temperatures in °C
- █ Precipitation totals in mm
- Source: MSN Weather UK (7 January 2009), INEGI, 2006 report
Imperial conversion
J	F	M	A	M	J	J	A	S	O	N	D
0.6 68 50	0.6 72 54	0.7 81 59	1.1 86 64	1.7 90 72	2.5 93 73	2.1 95 75	2.4 95 75	5.2 90 72	2.8 82 64	1 75 57	0.6 70 52
- █ Average max. and min. temperatures in °F
- █ Precipitation totals in inches

Anáhuac

Climate chart (precipitation, max. and min. temperature)
J	F	M	A	M	J	J	A	S	O	N	D
27 18 5	21 22 7	14 26 10	50 29 15	76 33 20	46 36 23	43 38 25	34 37 25	54 33 22	61 29 15	23 23 10	22 19 6
- █ Average max. and min. temperatures in °C
- █ Precipitation totals in mm
- Source: MSN Weather UK (7 January 2009), INEGI, 2006 report
Imperial conversion
J	F	M	A	M	J	J	A	S	O	N	D
1.1 64 41	0.8 72 45	0.6 79 50	2 84 59	3 91 68	1.8 97 73	1.7 100 77	1.3 99 77	2.1 91 72	2.4 84 59	0.9 73 50	0.9 66 43
- █ Average max. and min. temperatures in °F
- █ Precipitation totals in inches

=== Flora and fauna ===
Pinus pseudostrobus is the tree with largest volume per hectare in southern Nuevo León.

Flora and fauna of Nuevo León

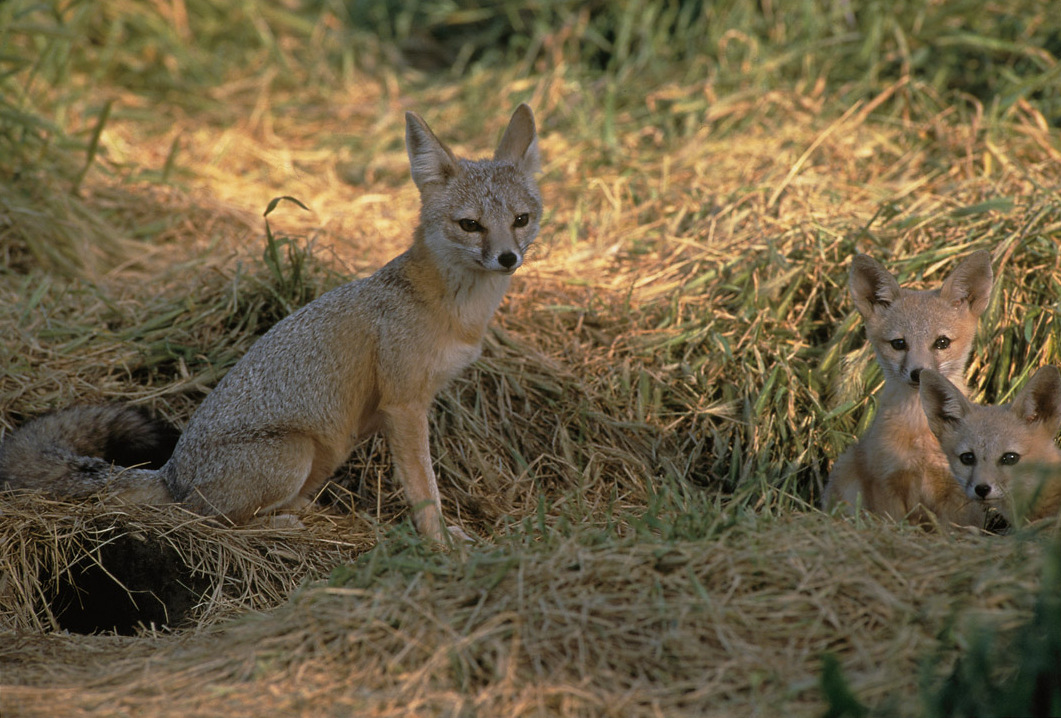
Vulpes macrotis

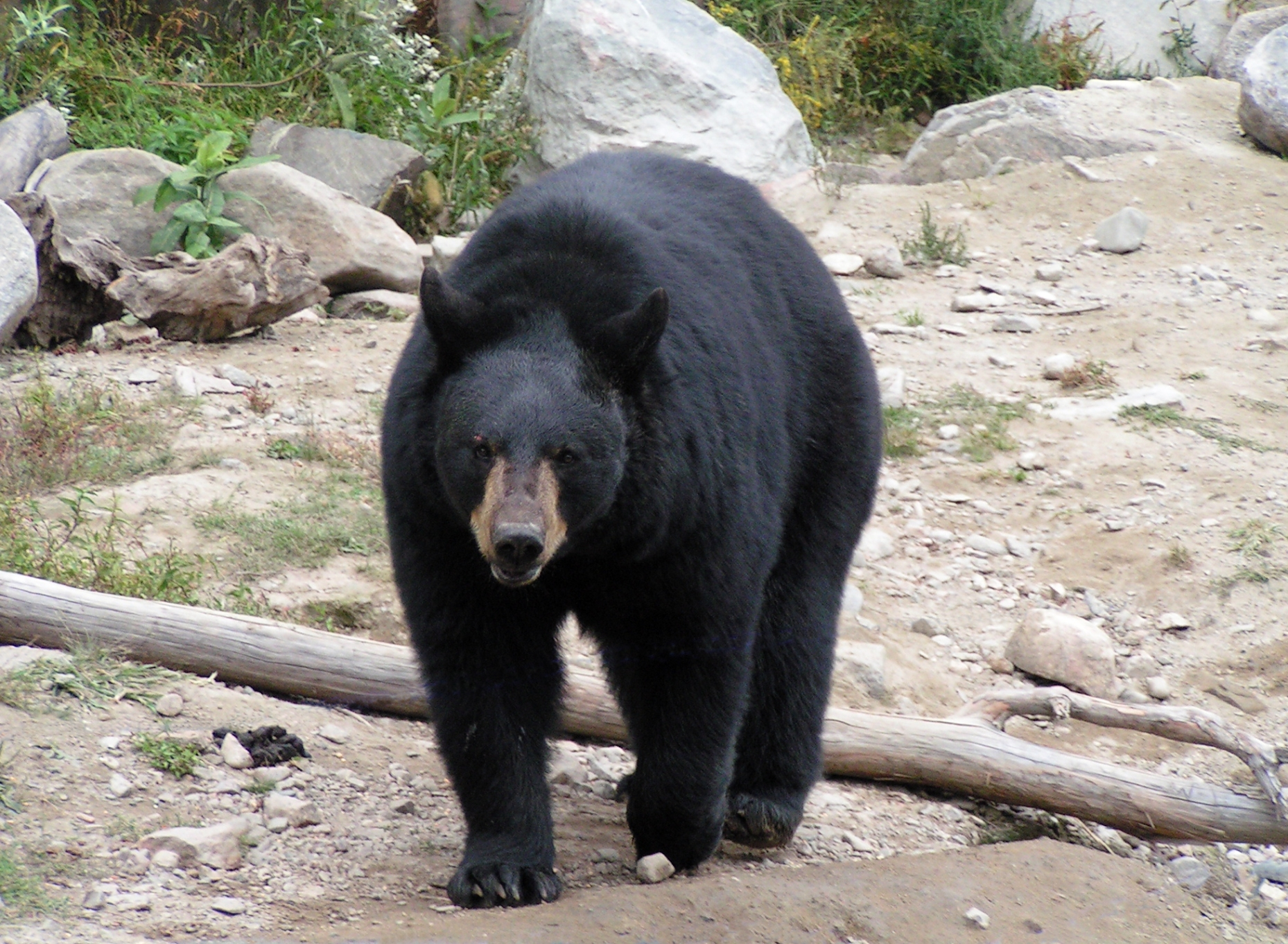
Ursus americanus

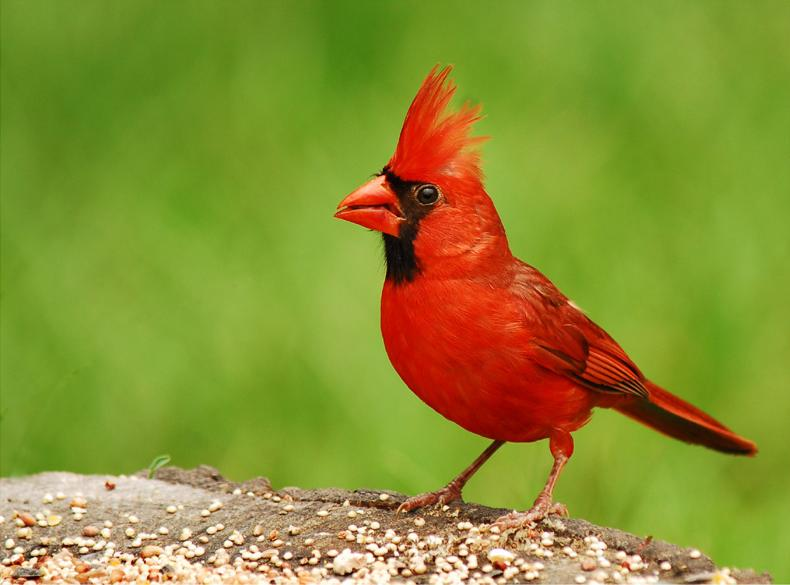
Cardinalis cardinalis

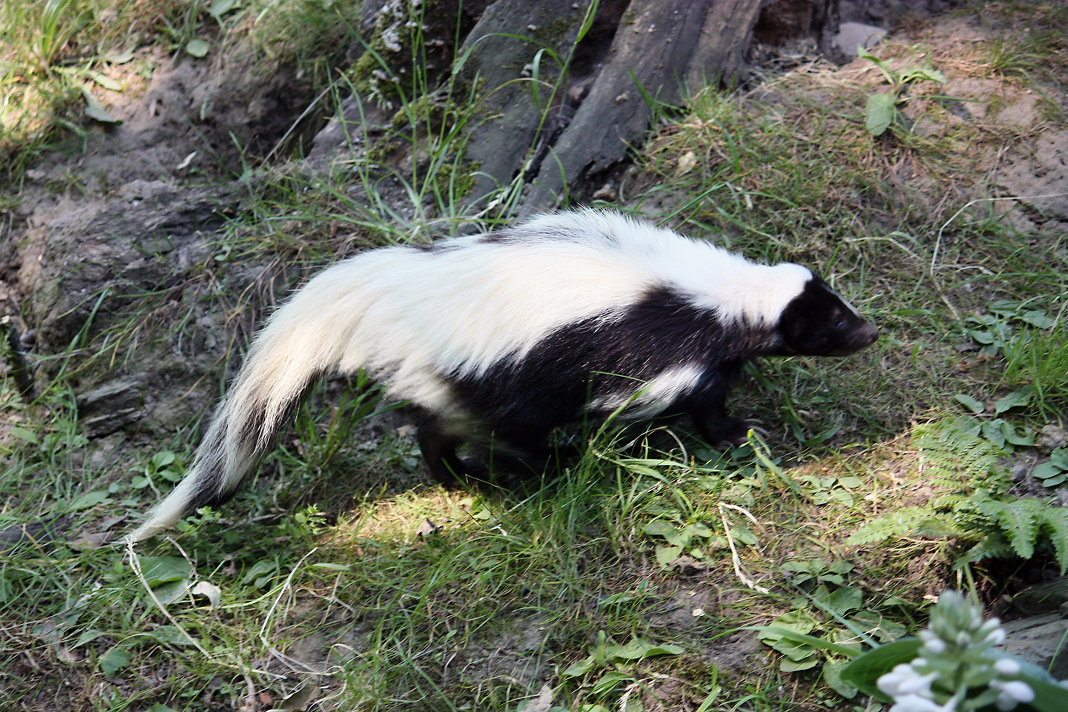
Mephitis macroura

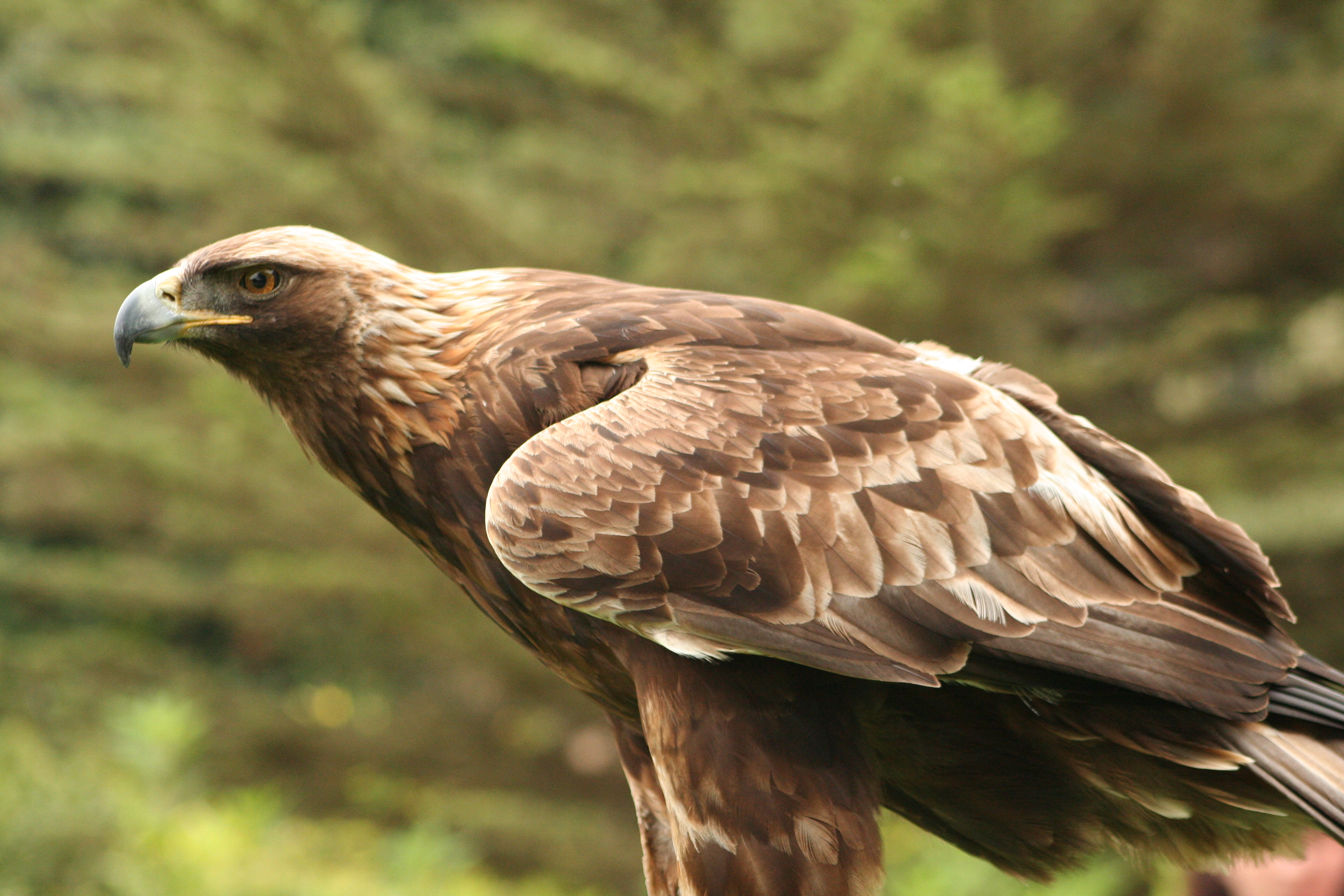
Aquila chrysaetos

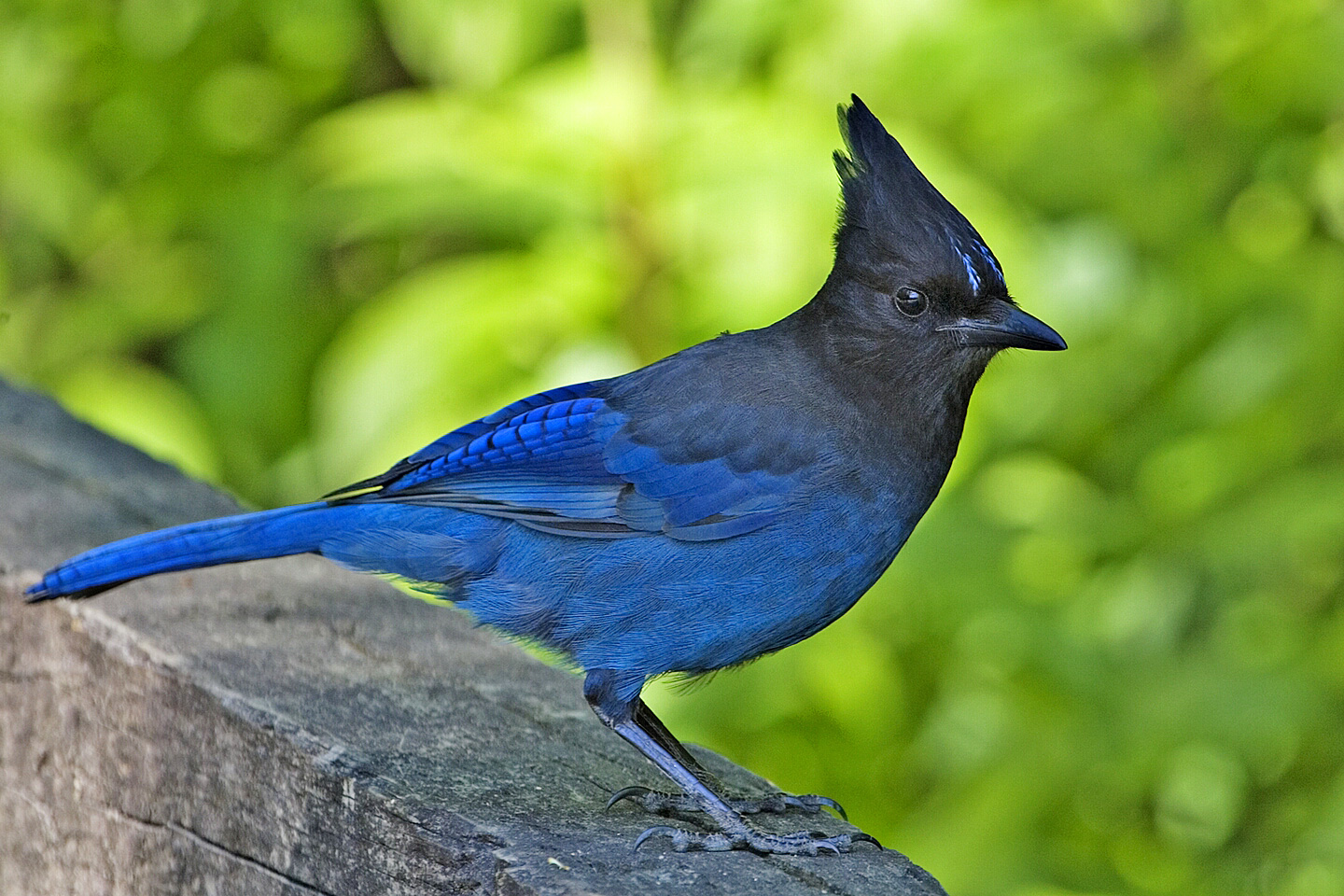
Cyanocitta stelleri

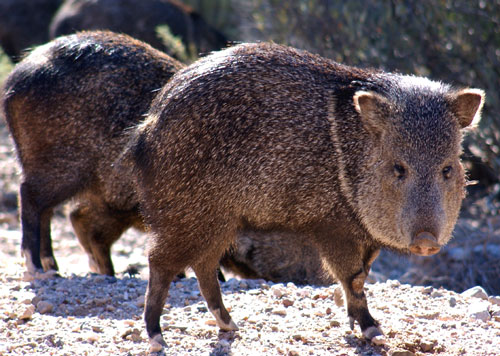
Dicotyles tajacu

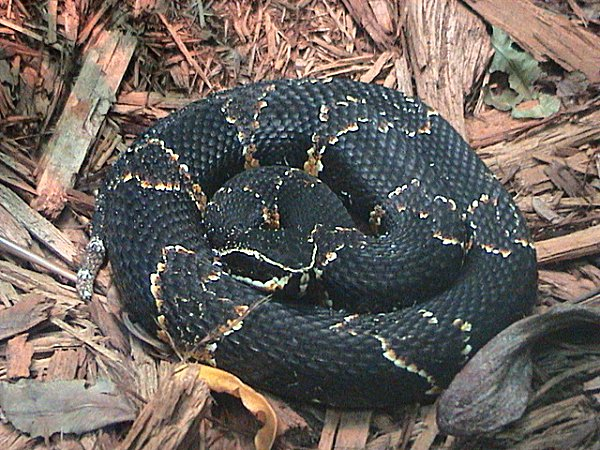
Agkistrodon taylori

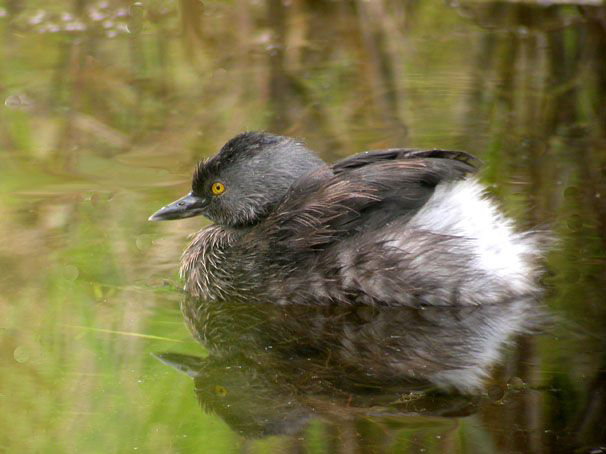
Tachybaptus dominicus

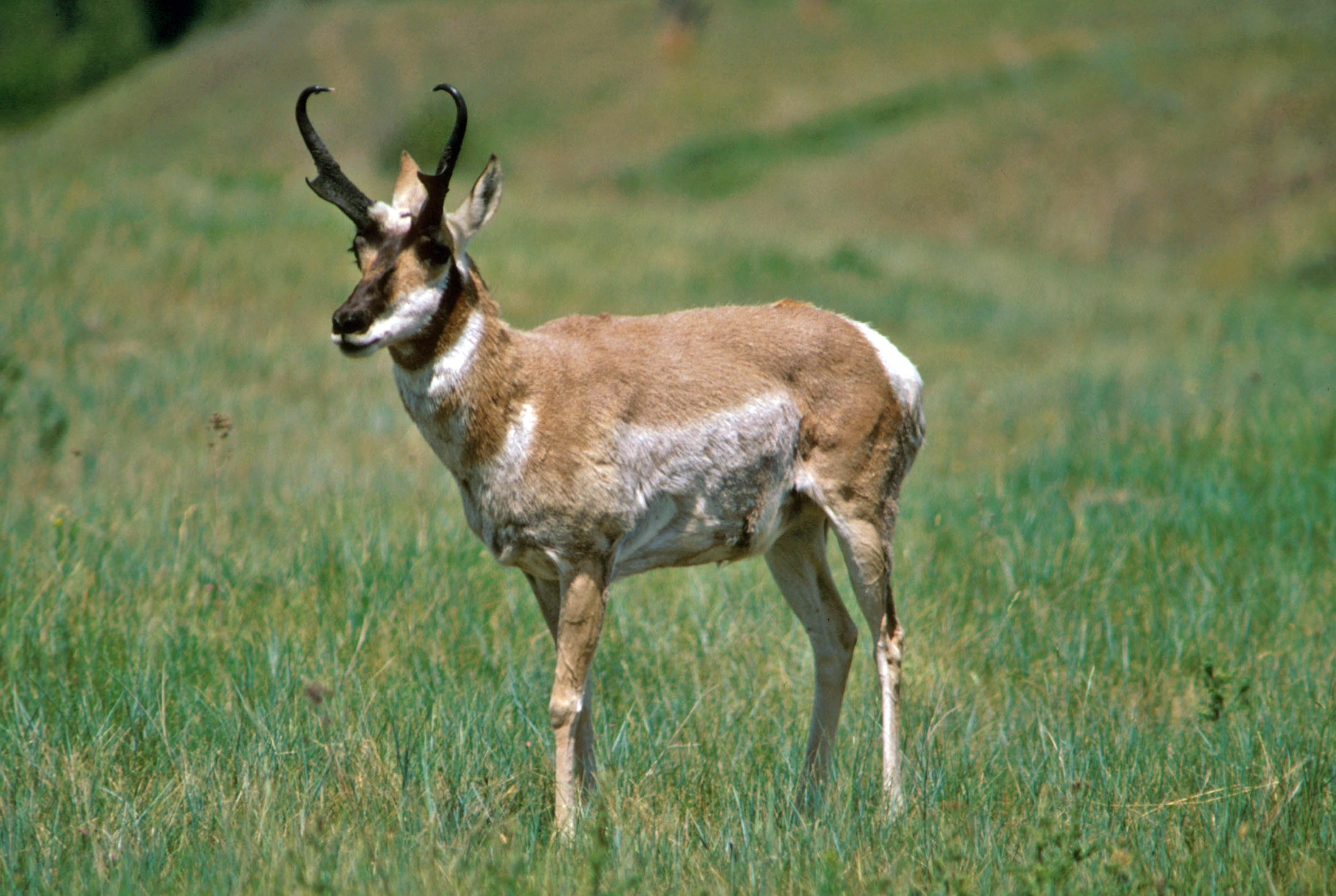
Antilocapra americana

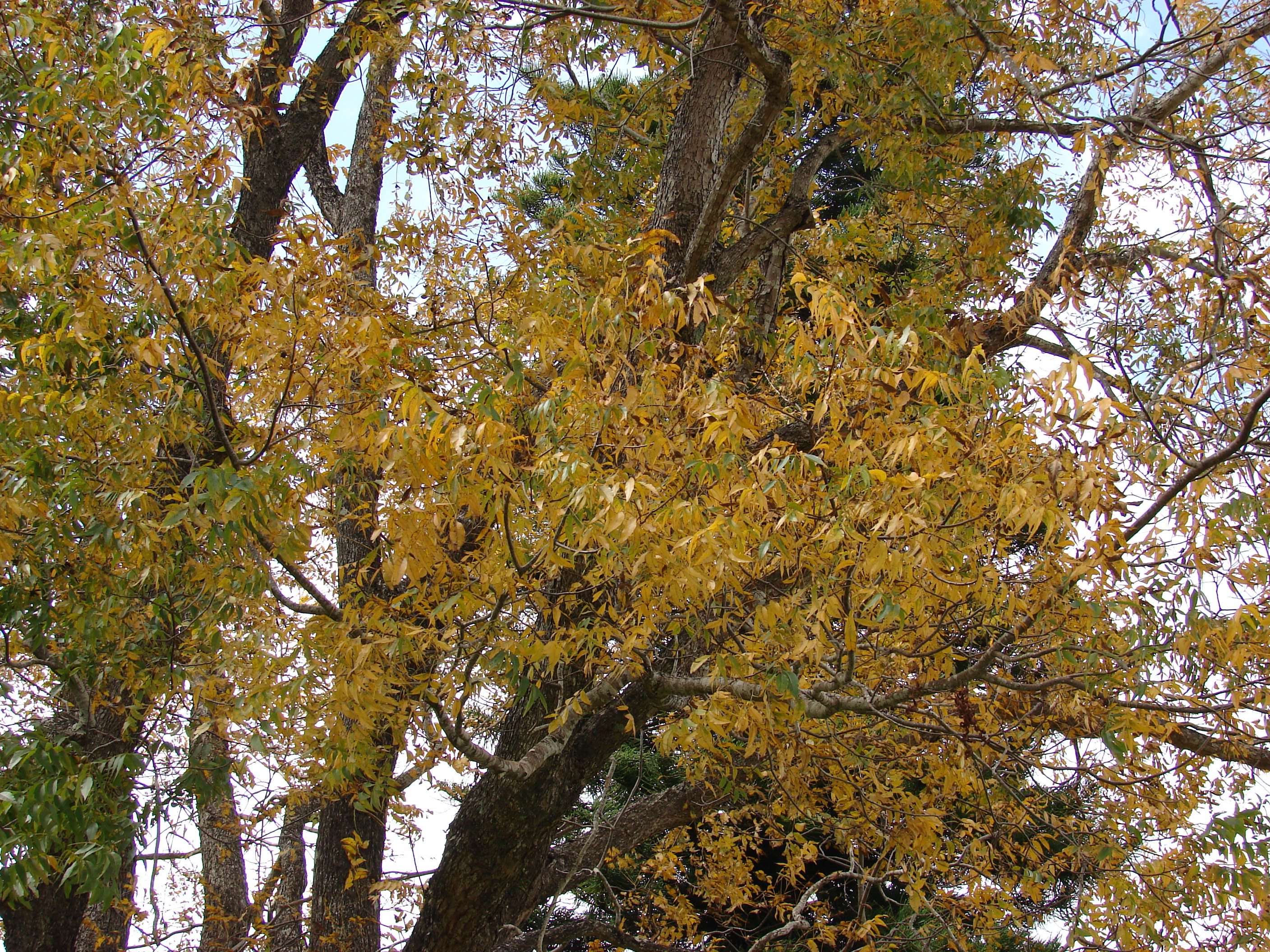
Carya illinoinensis

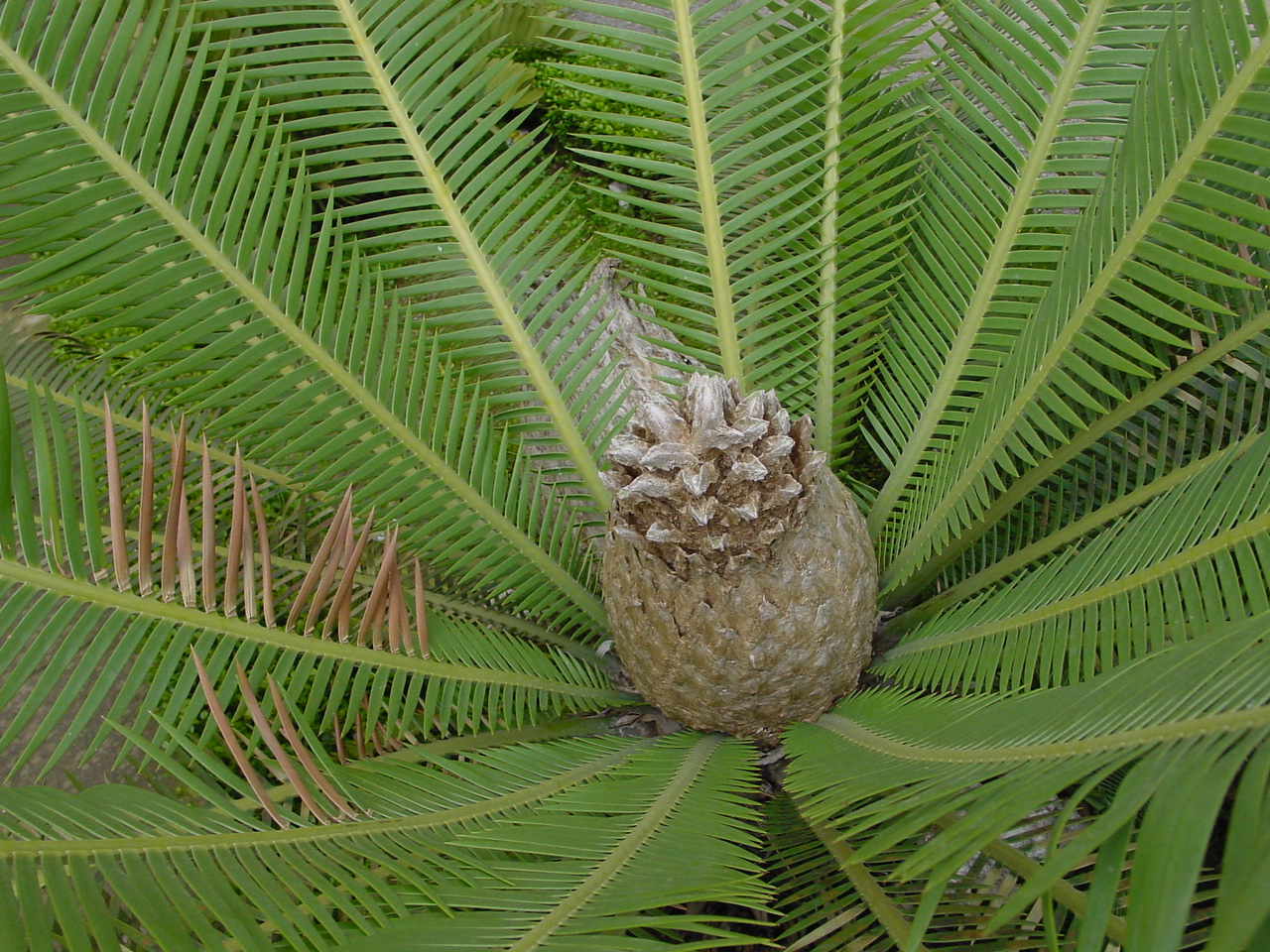
Dioon edule

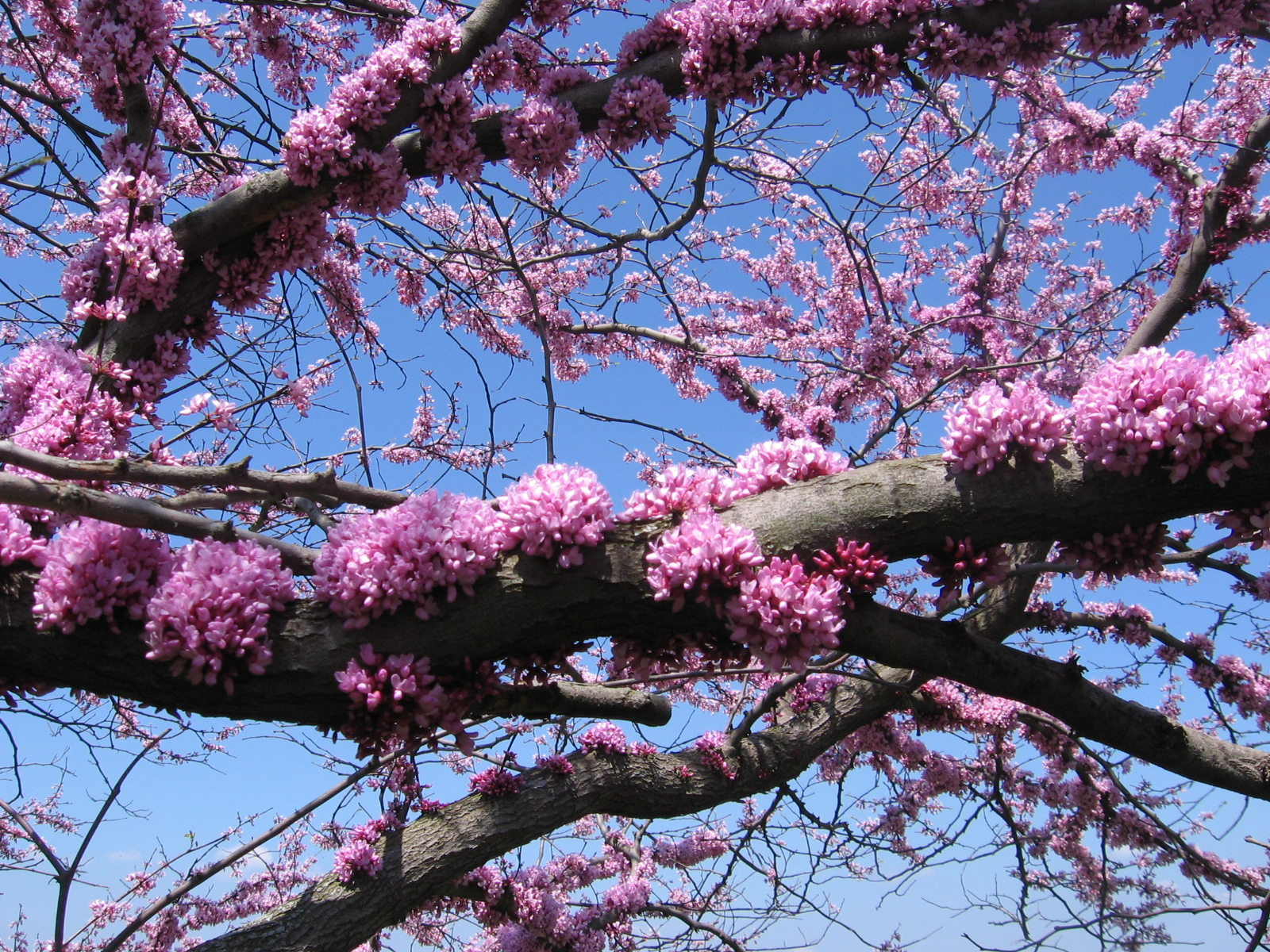
Cercis canadensis

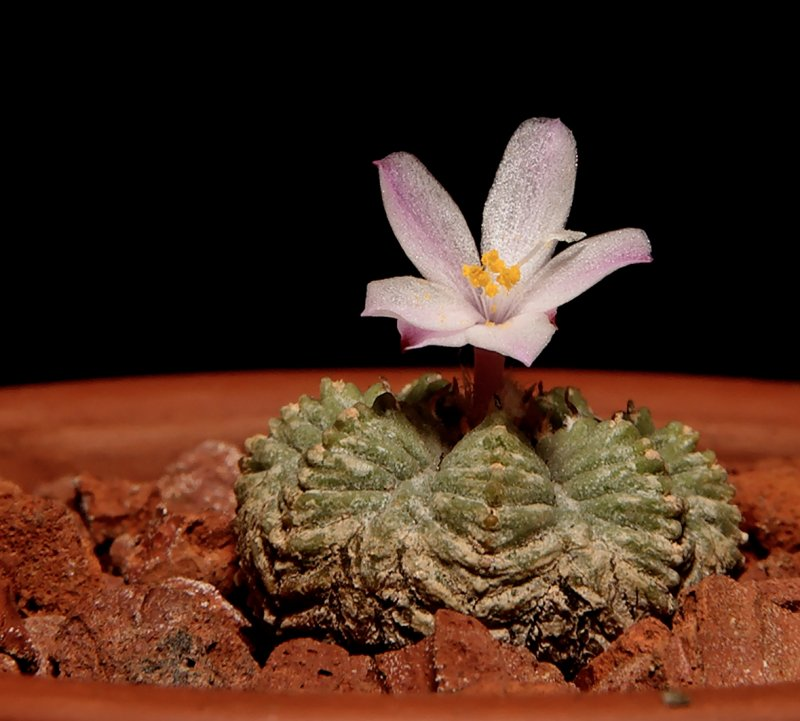
Aztekium ritteri

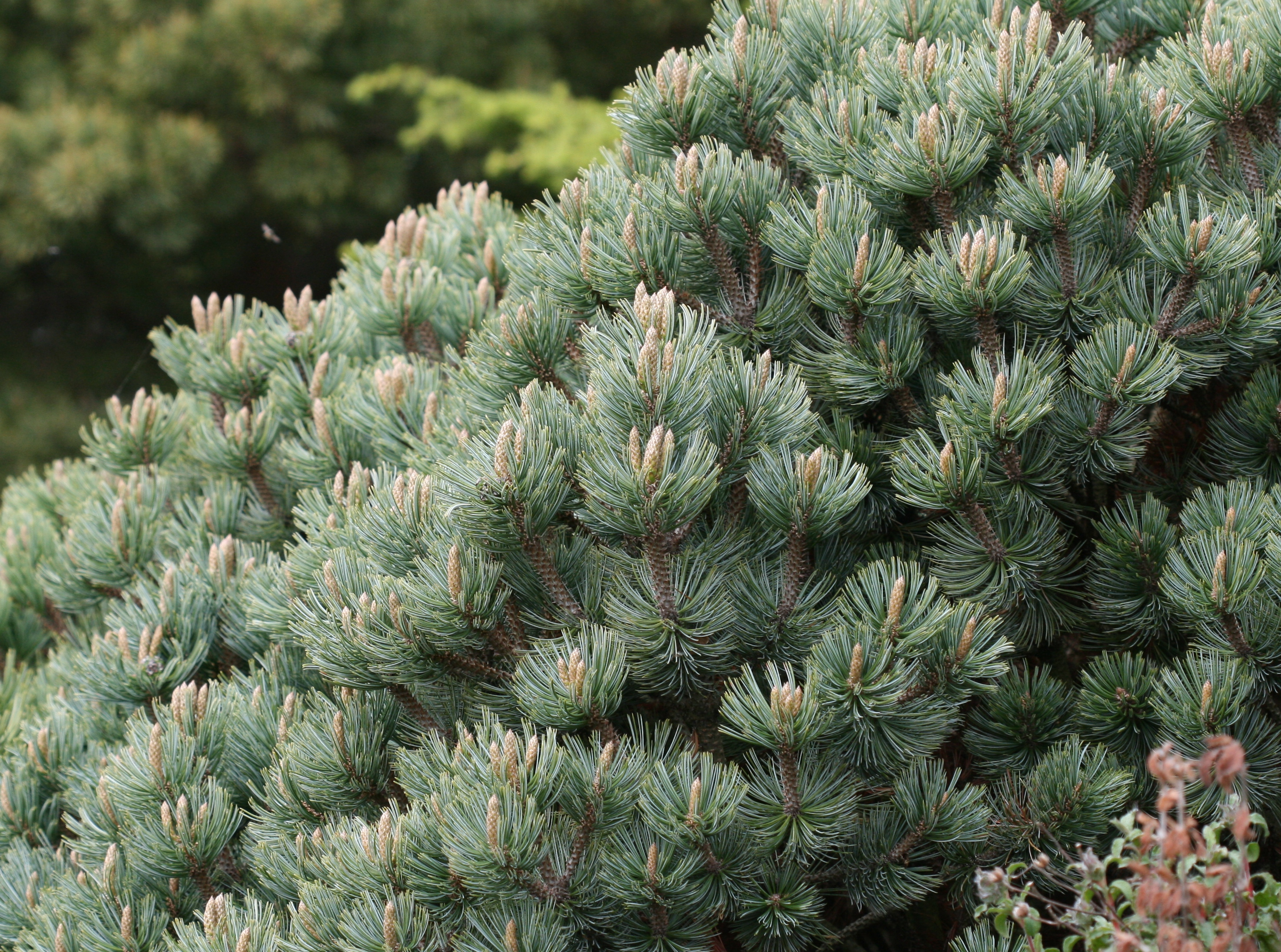
Pinus culminicola

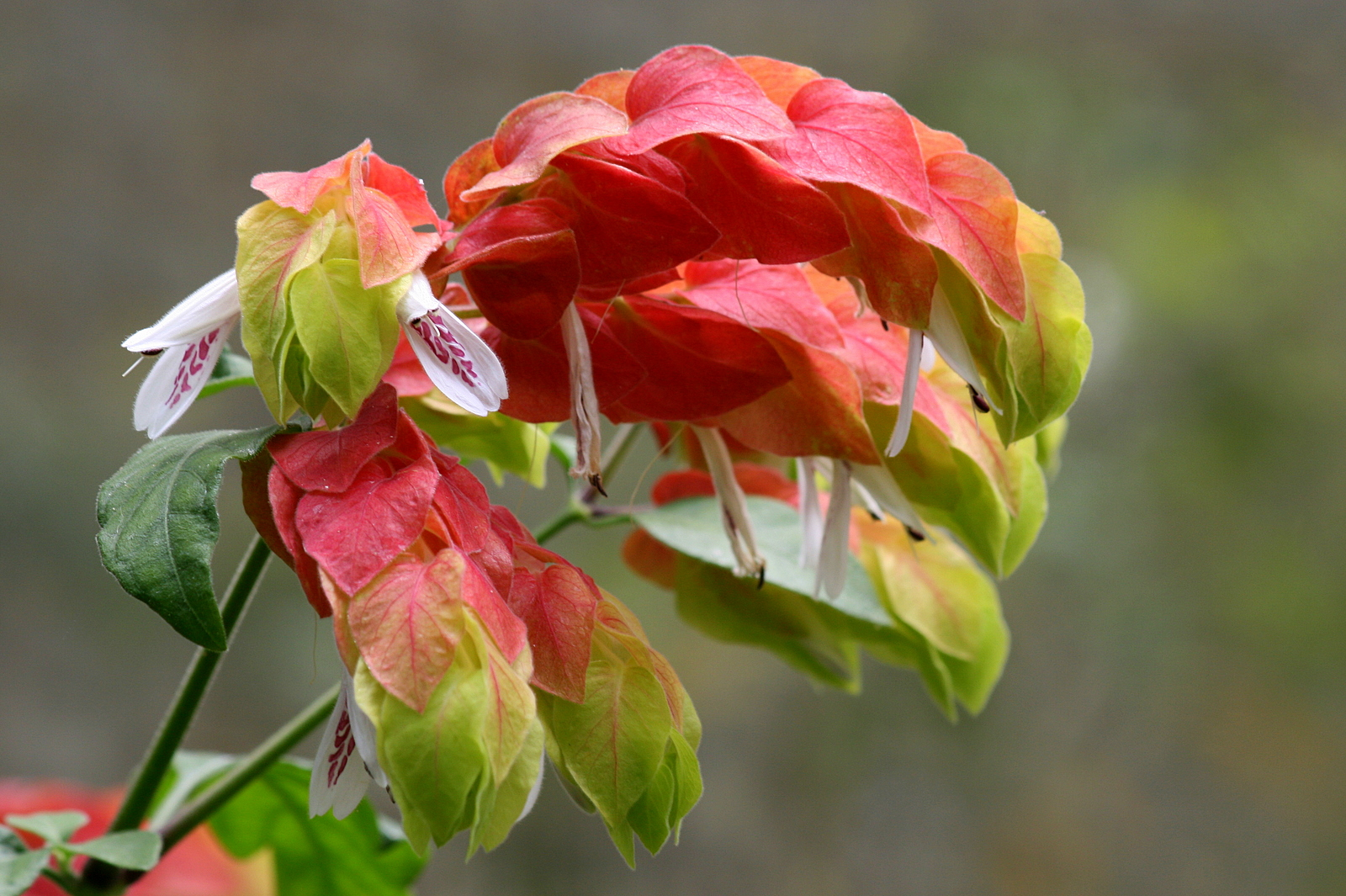
Justicia brandegeeana

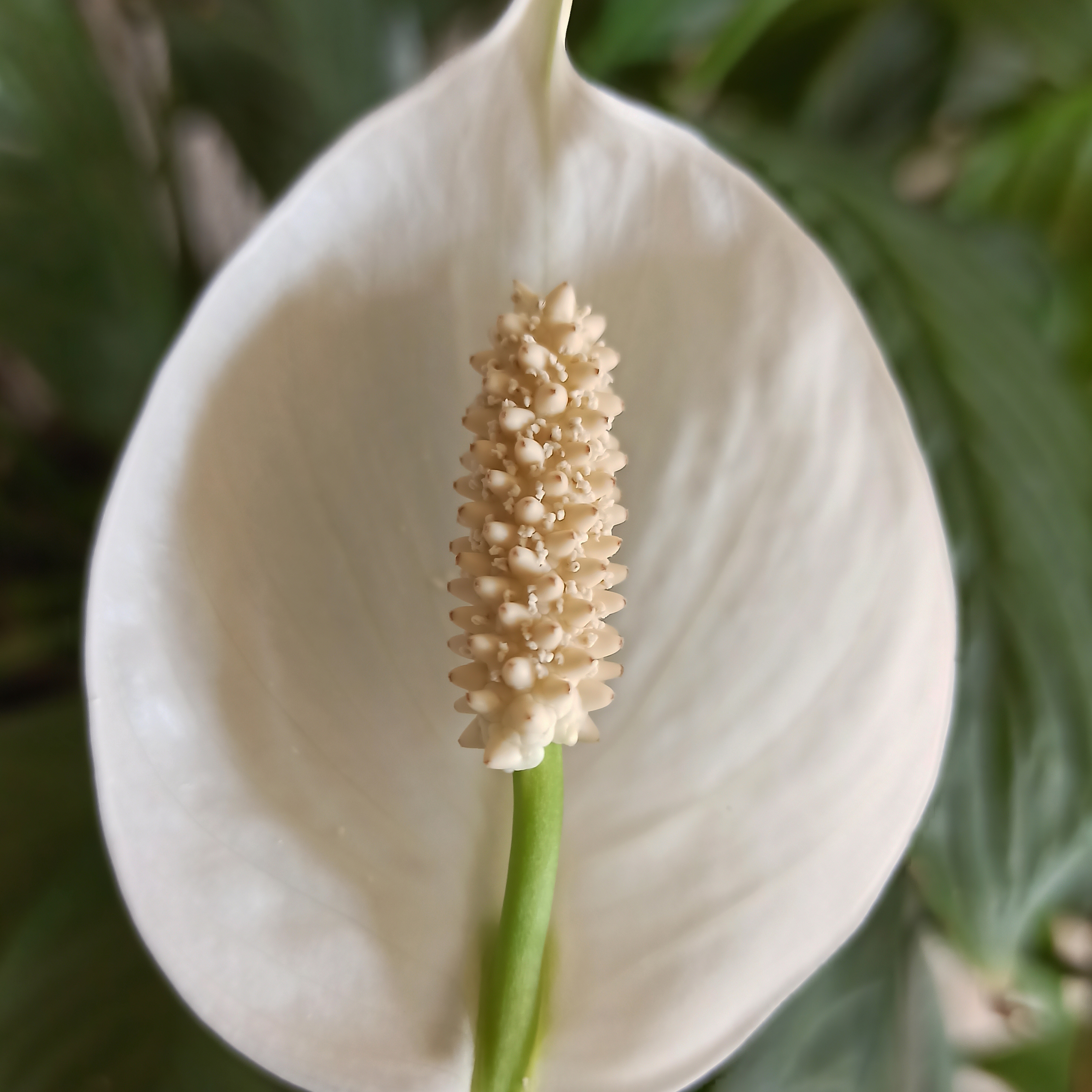
Spathiphyllum wallisii

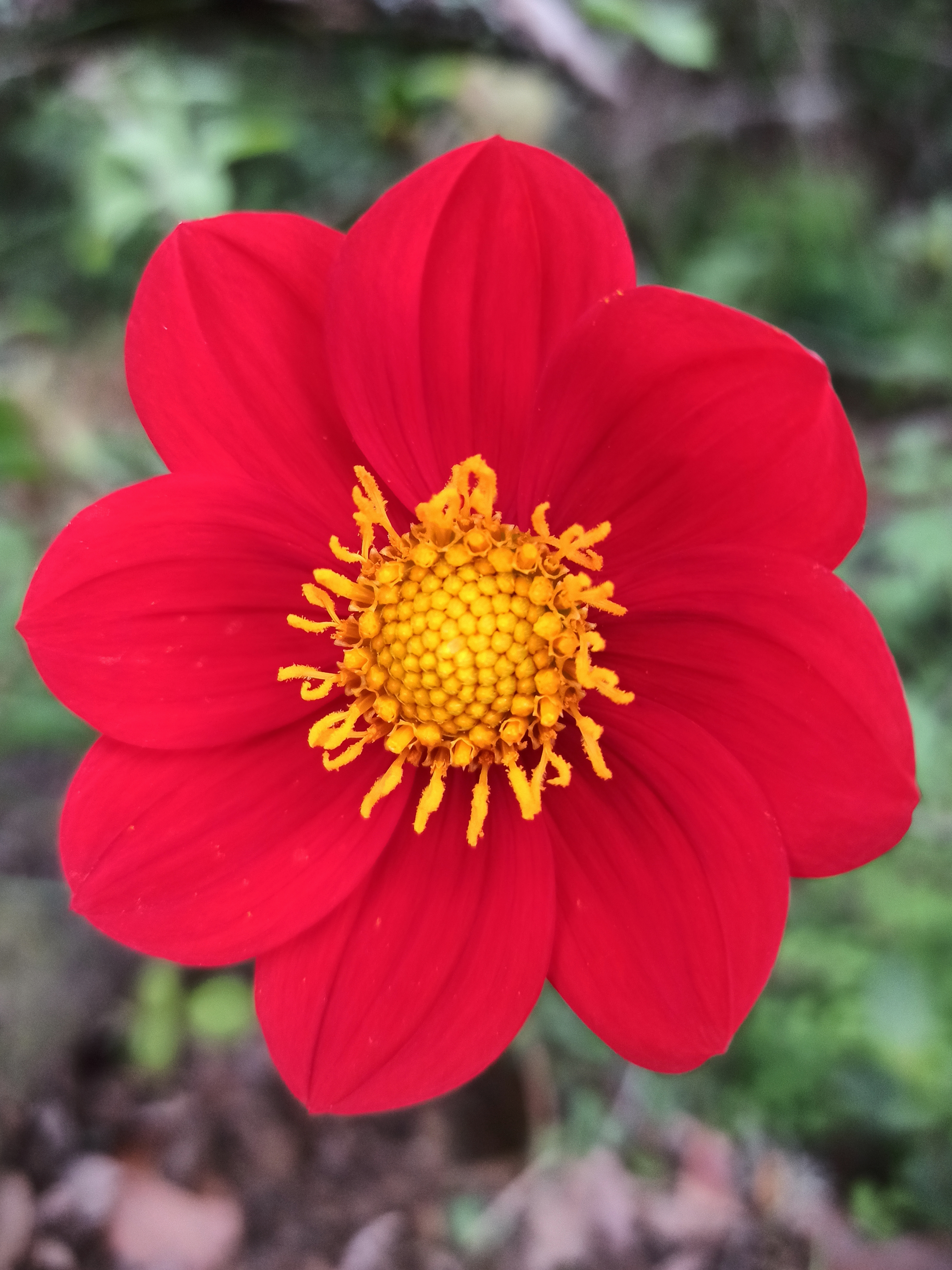
Dahlia coccinea

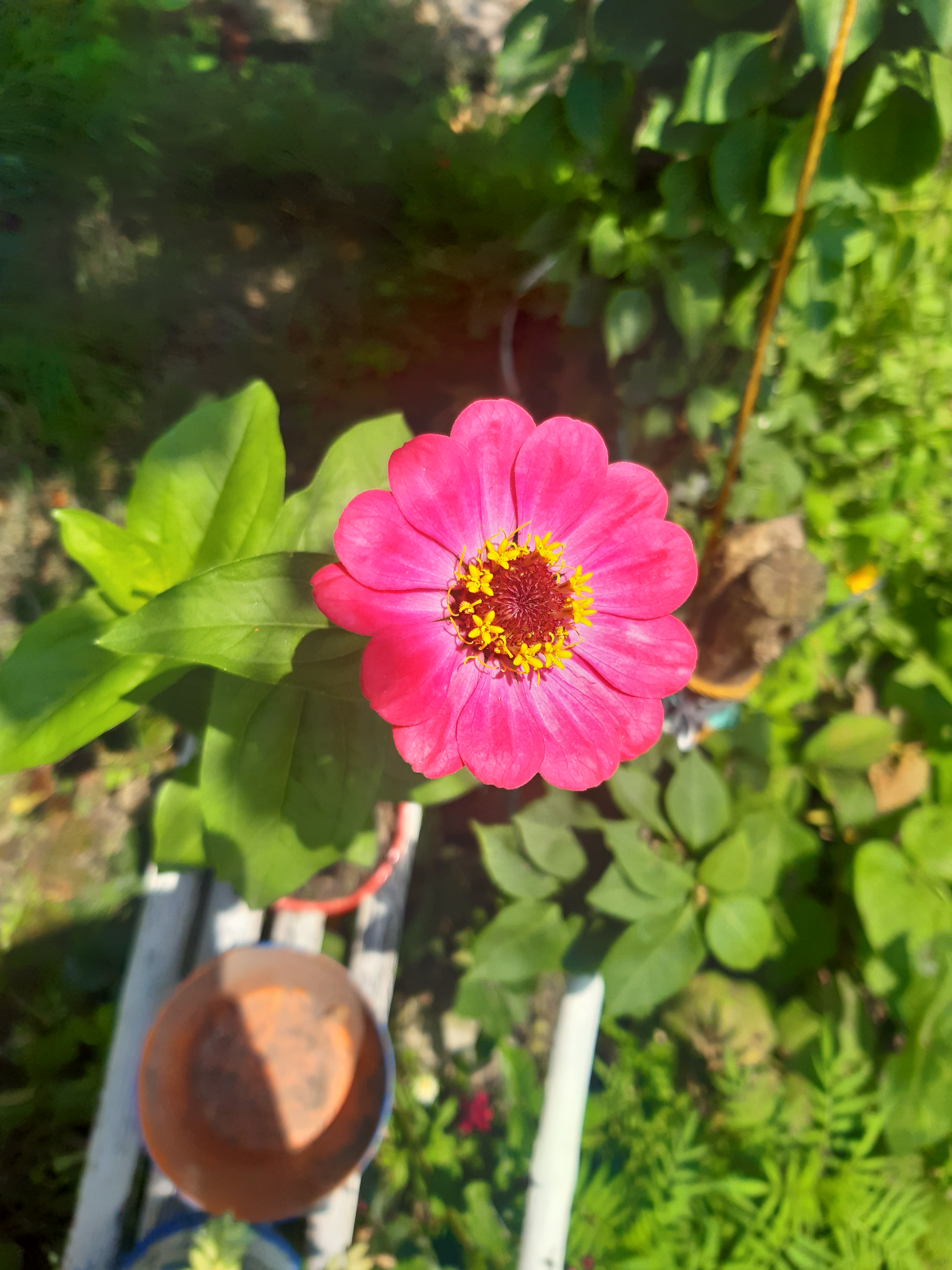
Zinnia elegans

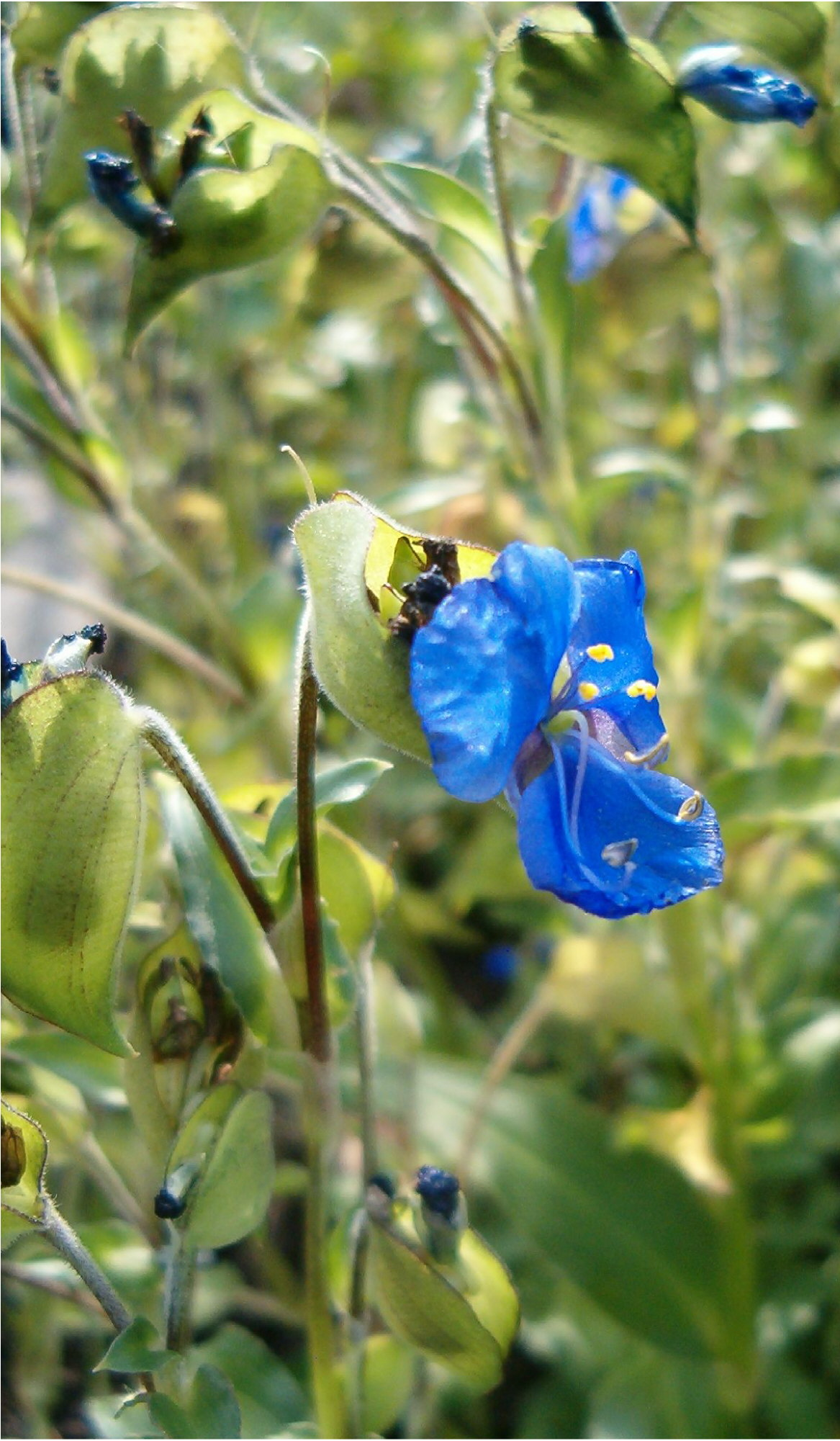
Commelina coelestis

=== Administrative divisions ===
Nuevo's León is divided into 51 municipalities (municipios). These municipalities are categorized into five regions, these being the Monterrey metropolitan area, Peripheral region, Citrícola region, Northern region, and the Southern region.

The Monterrey metropolitan area, which is the most populous and dense region in the state, is made up of twelve municipalities: Monterrey, Apodaca, Guadalupe, General Escobedo, Juárez, San Nicolás de los Garza, García, Santa Catarina, San Pedro Garza García, Cadereyta Jiménez, Salinas Victoria, and Santiago. The ten largest cities in the state are located in the metropolitan area.

Largest cities or towns in Nuevo León Source:
Rank		Municipality	Pop.
1	Monterrey	Monterrey	1,142,952
2	Guadalupe	Guadalupe	635,862
3	Apodaca City	Apodaca	536,436
4	Escobedo	General Escobedo	454,967
5	San Nicolás	San Nicolás de los Garza	412,199
6	Ciudad Juárez	Juárez	308,285
7	Santa Catarina	Santa Catarina	304,052
8	García	García	234,698
9	San Pedro	San Pedro Garza García	132,128
10	Cadereyta	Cadereyta Jiménez	75,721

== Demography ==
=== Population ===
Historical population
Year	Pop.	±%
1895	311,665	—
1900	327,937	+5.2%
1910	365,150	+11.3%
1921	336,412	−7.9%
1930	417,491	+24.1%
1940	541,147	+29.6%
1950	740,191	+36.8%
1960	1,078,848	+45.8%
1970	1,694,689	+57.1%
1980	2,513,044	+48.3%
1990	3,098,736	+23.3%
2000	3,834,141	+23.7%
2010	4,653,458	+21.4%
2020	5,784,442	+24.3%

The 2020 census determined that the population of Nuevo León was at 5,784,442, making it the seventh most populous state in the country. The state has experienced steady growth since the 1930s, with an average annual addition of 78,000 people from 1960 onwards. The largest growth occurred between 2010 and 2020, during which approximately 1,100,000 people were added. 96% percent of the total population occupies urban areas, significantly surpassing the national average of 79%, while only 4% live in rural areas.

As of 2024, Nuevo León ranks first in the country by life expectancy, with a life expectancy of 77.7, surpassing the national average of 75.5. In 2019, the primary causes of death were heart disease, malignant tumors, and diabetes.

Nuevo León's population density as of 2020 is 90 people per square kilometer, making it the fourteenth most dense state in Mexico. It is one of the sixteen states that surpass the country's average population density, which is 64 people per square kilometer. Much of the state's density is found in the Monterrey metropolitan area, where about 92% of the population resides, and where there is a population density of about 700 people per square kilometer.

There are 1,655,256 housing units in the state, placing it sixth nationwide. About 48% of these units have two bedrooms, and more than 95% of the units have running water, sewage systems, and electric power.

In 2020, Nuevo León had 49,500 foreign-born residents, with 46.8% from the United States, 12% from Venezuela, and 8.9% from Honduras. Between 2015 and 2020, 277,369 people immigrated to Nuevo León from other Mexican states, with 24% originating from Veracruz, 15% from Tamaulipas, 11% from San Luis Potosí, 6% from Coahuila, and 5% from the State of Mexico. In this same period, 91,433 emigrated from Nuevo León to other states, where 14% went to San Luis Potosí, 12% to Coahuila, 11% to Tamaulipas, 8% to Veracruz, and 6% to the State of Mexico. Additionally, 22,271 emigrated to another country, with 75% opting for the United States. The three most common motivations for migration in the state were family reunification, employment opportunities, and marriage.

=== Languages ===
Most common indigenous languages
Language	Population (as of 2020)
Nahuatl	0.77%
Huasteco	0.28%
Zapoteco	0.03%
Otomi	0.03%

During pre-Hispanic times, the nomadic indigenous peoples of Nuevo León spoke a diverse range of languages. Among the notable groups, the Rayados spoke Guachichil, the Pintos and Alazapas spoke Coahuilteco, and the Borrados spoke Quinigua. Other indigenous languages include Mamulique, Xanambre, Tamaulipeco, and Pame. Spanish was first introduced to the population during the Spanish colonization and Nahuatl was introduced by Tlaxcaltecan colonizers.

Currently, Spanish is the primary spoken language in the state. Additionally, Nuevo León ranks among the top 5 entities in the country with significant English proficiency. Moreover, with the influx of South Korean migration, Korean is gaining importance as a business language.

According to the 2020 census, 1.4% of the state's population speaks an indigenous language, a figure that increases every year. The most spoken indigenous languages include Nahuatl, Huasteco, Zapotec, and Otomi. Out of the population that speaks an indigenous language, 12% do not know Spanish.

For the promotion of indigenous languages, Nuevo León has an Indigenous Education department to cater to the student population who speak the five most spoken native languages. The aim is for students to preserve their pre-Hispanic heritage while learning Spanish and English, leading to the implementation of bilingual-indigenous education programs for members of native communities.

=== Religion ===
Religious affiliation (2020)
Catholic	77.7%
Protestant/Evangelical	11.9%
Unaffiliated	0.7%
Other religions	0.1%
No religion	9%

An overwhelming majority of the population believes in a higher power and considers themselves religious or spiritual. Christianity is the most widely professed religion, with 77.7% of the population being Catholic and 11.9% being Protestant or Evangelical. 0.1% of the population follow other religions, including Jewish, Islamic, Ethnic roots, Afro roots, and Spiritualist beliefs.

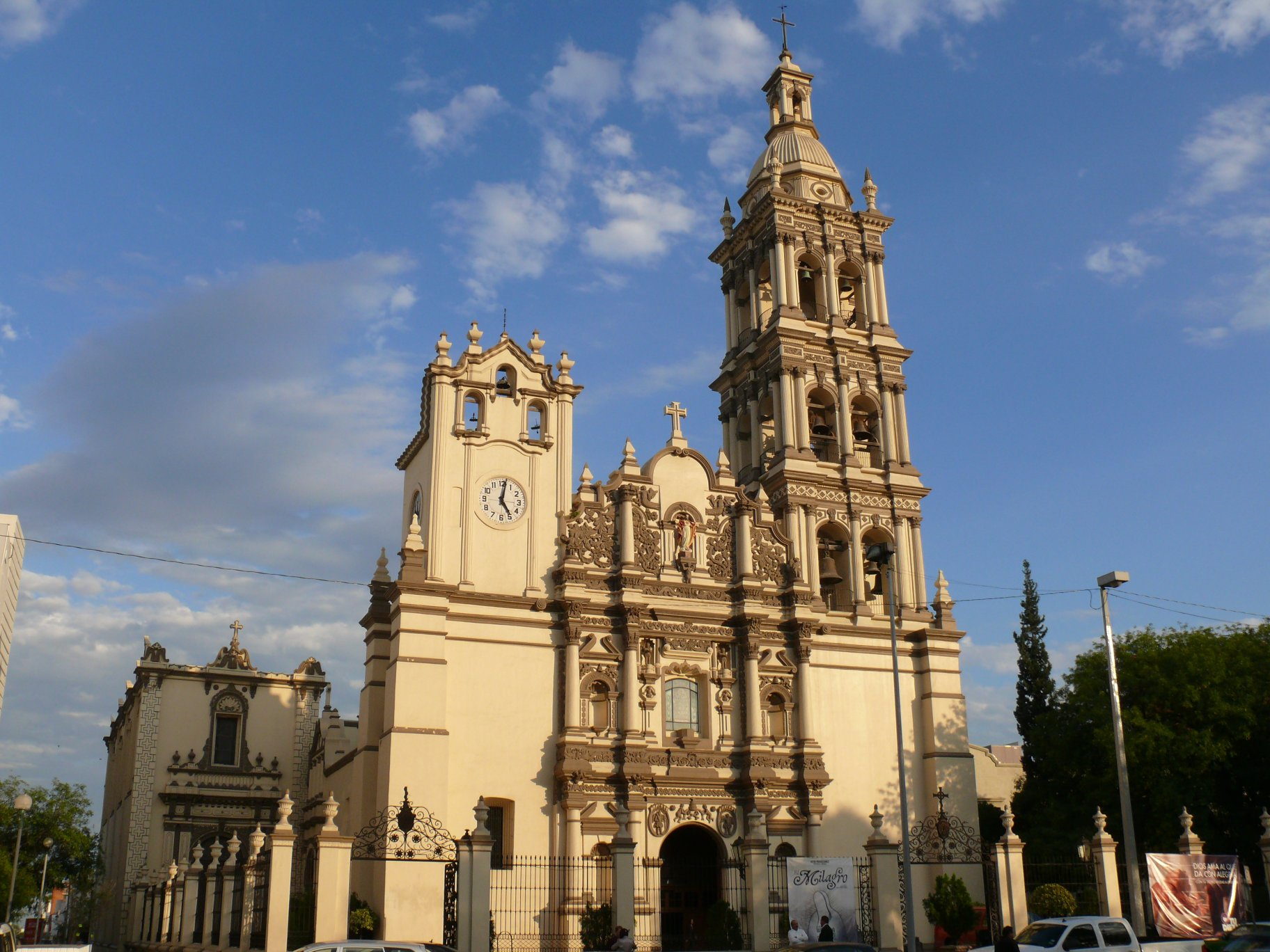
The Monterrey Cathedral, home of the Archdiocese of Monterrey.

The Catholic Church was established in the state after the Spanish conquest of Mexico and has consistently been the predominant religion, with the state ranking seventeenth among the most Catholic states in the country as of 2020. Nuevo León is home to one archdiocese, the Archdiocese of Monterrey, which encompasses the states of Nuevo León, Coahuila, and Tamaulipas. The archdiocese has eight suffragan dioceses, including Linares in Nuevo León and seven others in the neighboring states. As of 2024, in Nuevo León, there are 268 parishes.

Following the nationwide trend, the percentage of Catholics has been diminishing in the state. In 1910, about 96% of the state was Catholic. However, by the 1970s, the emergence of other religions, such as Protestantism and Evangelicalism, became noticeable. In 2000, the Catholic population stood at 87.9%, decreasing further to 77.7% in 2020. Additionally, religious affiliation in the state has also experienced a decline, with 2.8% identifying as non-religious in 2000, rising to 9% in 2020.

== Education ==
Nuevo León demonstrates a high standard of living through educational metrics. Only 2% of its population lacks formal education, and 26% have earned professional degrees. Additionally, the state maintains the second-lowest illiteracy rate in the country, at 1.5%, behind only Mexico City.

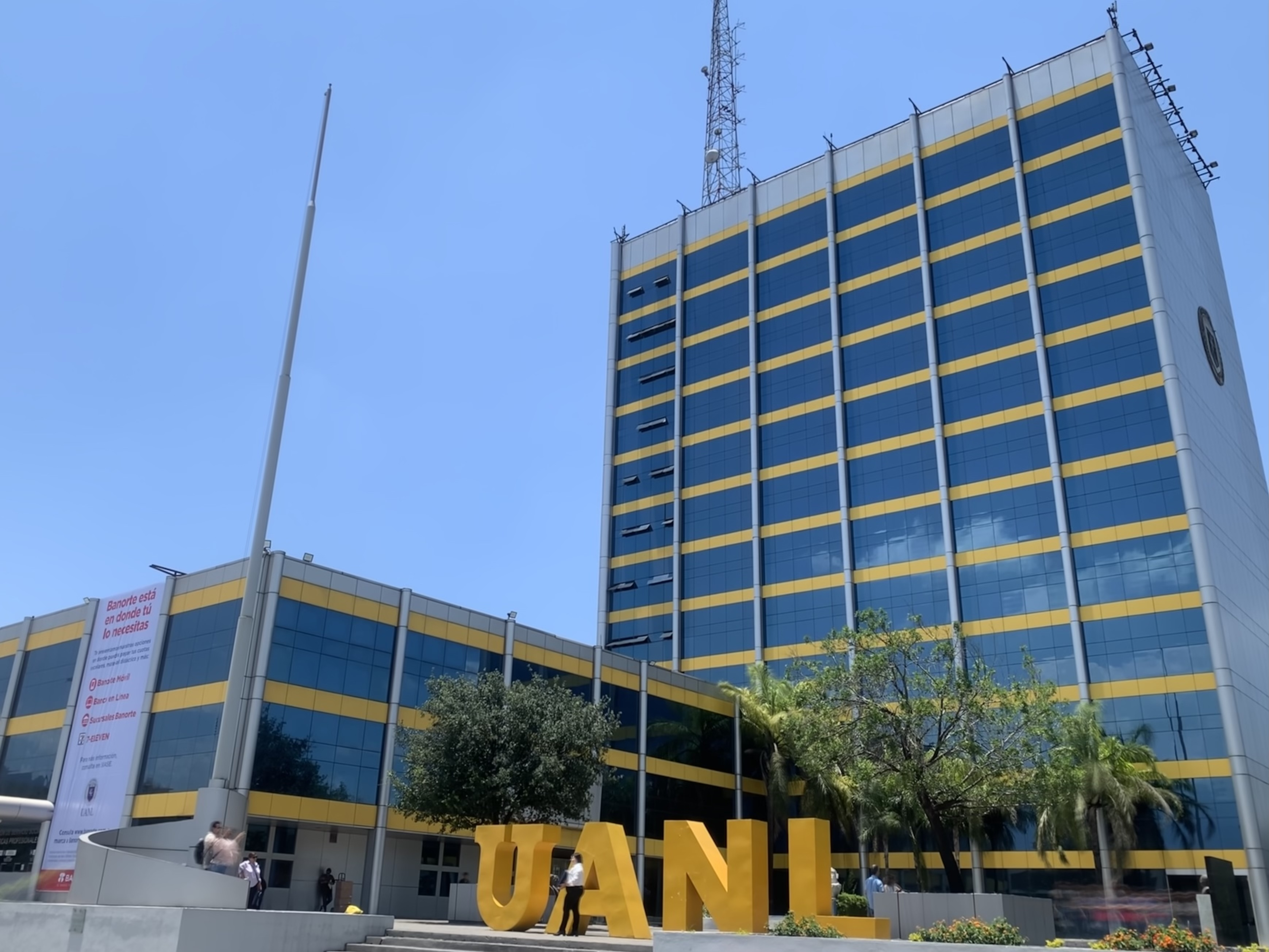
Autonomous University of Nuevo León

The state is home to the Autonomous University of Nuevo León (UANL), the third largest public university in Mexico. It has seven campuses scattered across the state, offering 91 undergraduate degrees and 160 postgraduate degrees. According to QS World University Rankings, in 2023, it was ranked as one of the top fifty universities in Latin America and ranked eighth in Mexico. The university also runs 29 high schools in the state, of which 4 are technical high schools. Several graduates from the university have achieved notable success in various fields. Notably, as of 2024, six alumni have served as governor of Nuevo León, while others have become accomplished athletes, including Olympic medalists like Raúl González and Mariana Avitia.

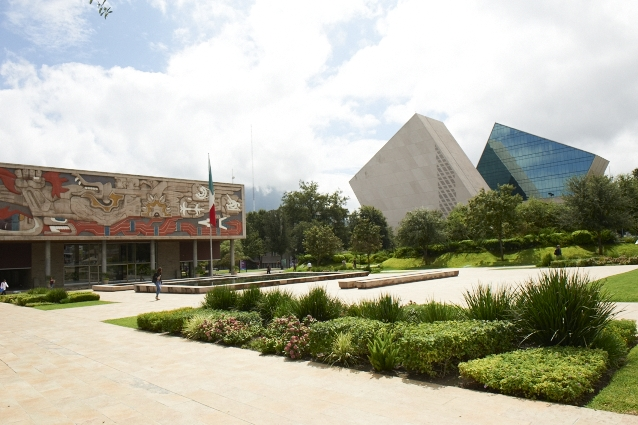
Monterrey Institute of Technology and Higher Education

The state is also home to one of the most important private universities in Latin America, the Monterrey Institute of Technology and Higher Education (ITESM). It offers 57 undergraduate and 44 postgraduate degrees and was ranked as the top university in Mexico by QS World University Rankings in 2023. The institute also sponsors a group of five high schools in the state, known as Prepa Tec, with each campus accredited as an IB World School.

Additionally, the state hosts other educational institutions such as the University of Monterrey (UDEM), Universidad Regiomontana (U-ERRE), Universitario Insuco (INSUCO), Universidad del Norte (UN), Universidad Interamericana del Norte (UIN), Universidad del Valle de México (UVM), Universidad Humanista de las Américas (UHA), Centro de Estudios Universitarios (CEU), Universidad Metropolitana de Monterrey (UMM), University of Montemorelos (UM), and the Instituto Tecnológico de Nuevo León (ITNL).

== Economy ==
As of 2022, Nuevo León had a gross domestic product (GDP) of MXN 2.349 trillion, or US$116.9 billion, the third highest in Mexico, behind Mexico City and the State of Mexico while also contributing to 8.25% of the country's GDP. If the state was its own country, it would have ranked as the 62nd largest economy globally, ahead of Slovakia and behind Ethiopia. With a GDP per capita of approximately US$19,452, it stands as the third-highest among Mexican states, surpassing the national average of US$10,950. Its GDP per capita is comparable to those of some European Union members like Slovakia, Hungary, and Poland.

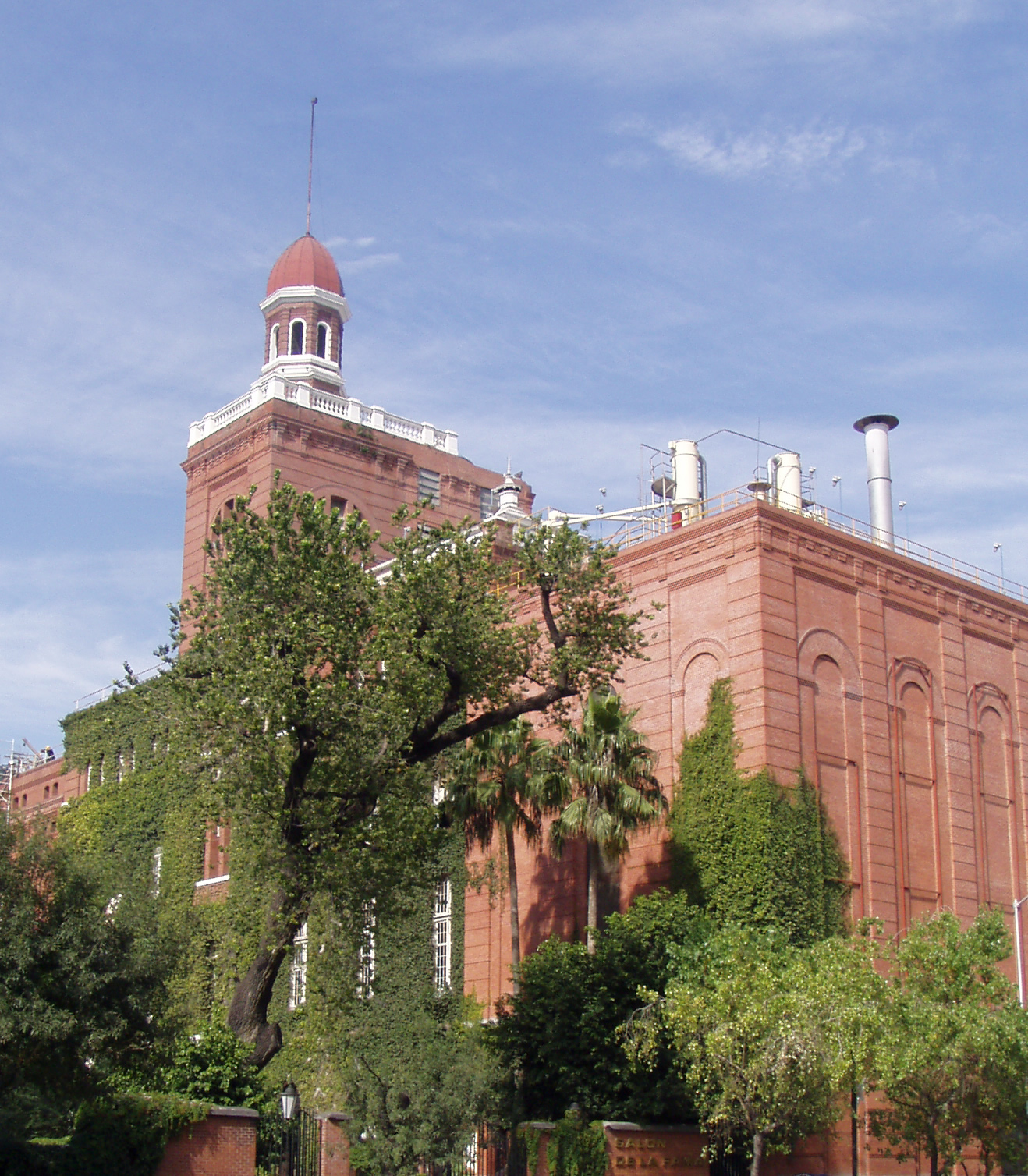
The facilities of the Cervecería Cuauhtémoc Moctezuma brewery.

There are many important companies headquartered in the Monterrey metropolitan area, some of which include Cuauhtémoc Moctezuma Brewery, brewers of Sol, Tecate, XX, Bohemia, Indio and Nochebuena; Cemex, the fifth-largest cement company in the world; FEMSA, the largest bottled beverage company in Latin America; Banorte, one of the strongest national banks in Mexico; and ALFA, producers of petrochemicals, aluminum auto components, and refrigerated foods.

=== Manufacturing ===
Nuevo León's economy has a strong focus on export oriented manufacturing (i.e. maquiladora), with manufacturing making up 41.7% of the state's GDP in 2021. Additionally, since 2018, Nuevo León has been considered the country's leader in manufacturing, contributing 10.6% to the national industrial GDP in 2022. Key manufacturing industries in the state include the automobile, basic metals, food and beverage, and metal fabrication industries.

=== Agriculture ===
In 2022, Nuevo León had 1,035,492 hectares of land available for agricultural use. Most of the state's agricultural industry is found outside of the Monterrey metropolitan area, in the Citrícola region, which comprises the municipalities of Allende, General Terán, Hualahuises, Linares, Montemorelos, and Rayones. The region specializes in citrus production, contributing to Mexico's citrus production with a notable 7% share in oranges and 1.6% in grapefruits. Additionally, the region also produces corn, beans, wheat, alfalfa, barley, potatoes, sorghum, avocados, apples, and lemons.

There have been efforts of expanding the agricultural industry to the southern part of the state; however, since this region is more dry, it presents a major hurtle for agriculture and livestock.

=== Technology ===
In recent years, the state government has been making efforts in attracting significant investments in aeronautics, biotechnology, mechatronics, information and communication technologies fields with the creation of the Research and Technology Innovation Park PIIT (Parque de Investigación e Innovación Tecnológica), a technology park oriented in the development, innovation and research of sciences. The project is one of the key strategies within the Monterrey, City of Knowledge program. The park is located in the municipality of Apodaca, part of Greater Monterrey at the 10 km of the highway to Monterrey's International Airport. It consists of a total surface area of 70 Ha (172 acres), half of it already committed to R&D centers. The other 35 Ha (86 acres) are available for research and development centers, and for businesses that meet the Park's objectives.

== Transport ==
=== Highways ===
Mexican Federal Highways (Carraterras Federales) include:

Federal Highway 2 across the north from Hidalgo (Coahuila) for 24 km via Colombia to Nuevo Laredo (Tamaulipas).

Federal Highway 9 north from Federal Highway 85 in Allende 38 km via Atongo de Abajo, Palmitos and Puerto Rico to Federal Highway 40 in Cadereyta.

Federal Highway 40 (the Inter-Oceanic or Mazatlan-Matamoros Highway) west from Reynosa (Tamaulipas) for 248 km via Cadereyta and Monterrey to Saltillo (Coahuila state).

Federal Highway 53 north-west from Federal Highway 85 in Apodaca near Monterrey 116 km via Escobedo to Coahuila.

Federal Highway 54 north-east from Monterrey 125 km via Apodaca, Pesquería, Marín, Doctor González, Cerralvo and General Treviño to Tamaulipas where it terminates at Mier.

Federal Highway 57 from Saltillo (Coahuila) across the south-west for 190 km via San Rafael and San Roberto to Matehuala (San Luis Potosi state).

Federal Highway 58 west from Linares 95 km via Iturbe to Federal Highway 57 in San Roberto.

Federal Highway 85 (the Inter-American highway, part of the Pan-American) south from Nuevo Laredo (Tamaulipas state) and south-east via Monterrey to Ciudad Victoria in Tamaulipas state.

State highways include State Highway 1 Spur (NL 1) (Carretera estatal 1) south from Laredo–Colombia Solidarity International Bridge at Colombia 75 km (47 miles) to SH1 in Ciudad Anáhuac.

=== Railroads ===
Canadian Pacific Kansas City (formerly Kansas City Southern de Mexico) operates the former Mexican National line connecting Monterrey with Saltillo to the west and Nuevo Laredo to the north on the US border, with a branch line north-east to Matamoros.

Ferromex (Ferrocarril Mexicano: Mexican Railroad) includes a Belgian-built line (the former F.C. de Monterrey al Golfo Mexicano) connecting Monterrey with the port of Tampico to the south-east, and west to Saltillo.

Monterrey Metro (Metrorrey), opened 1991, has 31 km with two lines and 32 stations.

=== Airports ===
There are two international airports at Monterrey (General Mariano Escobedo International Airport and Del Norte International Airport), and a major domestic airport at Agualeguas.

== Government ==
=== State government ===
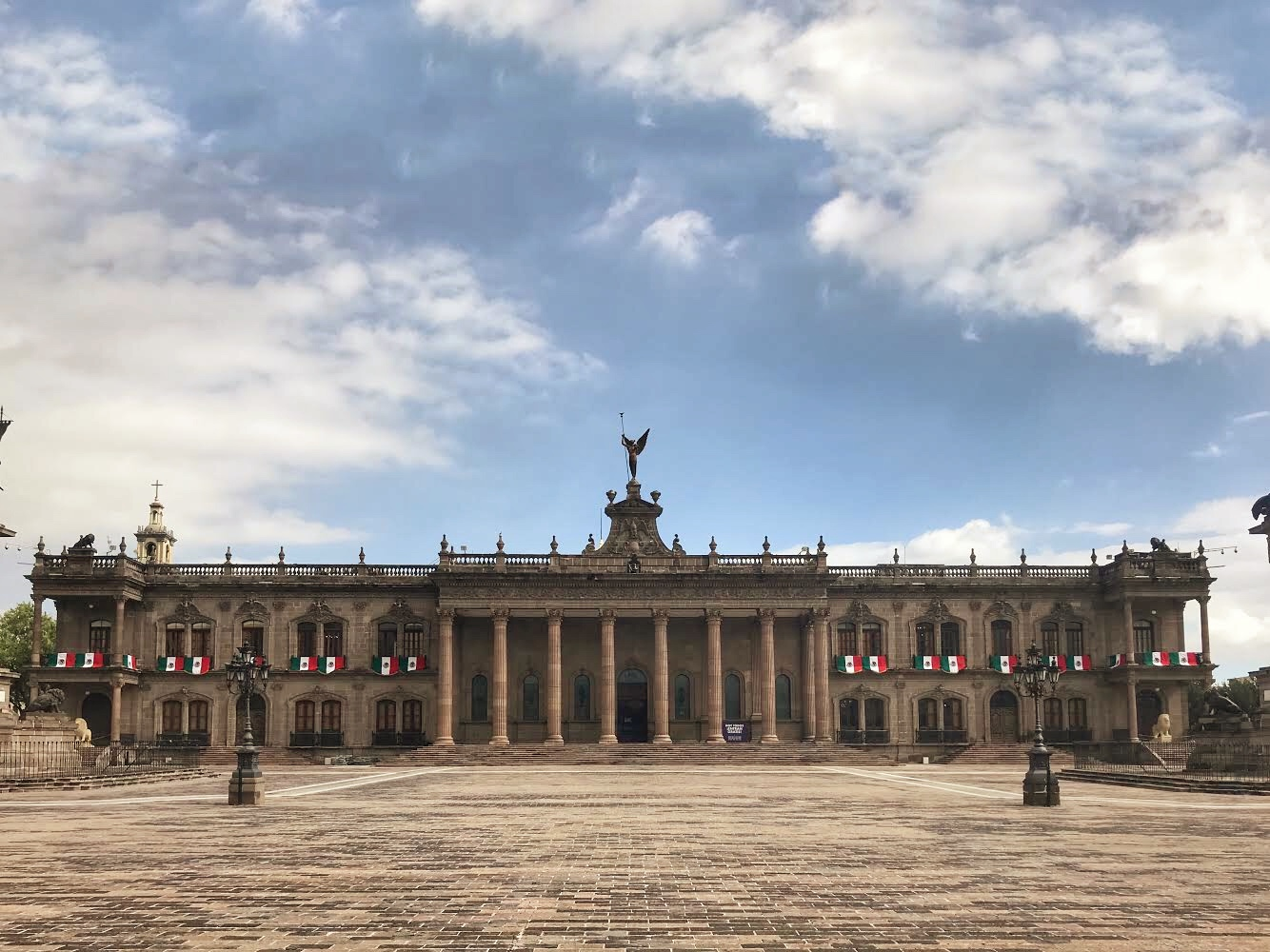
Government Palace of Nuevo León, seat of the government of Nuevo León and workplace of the governor.

Article 62 of the state constitution of Nuevo León defines the separation of powers: the executive branch, consisting of the governor, the centralized public administration, and the parastatal public administration; the legislative branch, consisting of the Congress of Nuevo León; and the judicial branch, consisting of the Superior Court of Justice of Nuevo León, first-instance courts, and lower courts.

==== Executive branch ====
The executive branch of Nuevo León consists of a governor serving a non-renewable six-year term and various executive entities that are divided into two main components: the centralized public administration, which includes seventeen ministries known as secretariats, each overseen by a governor-appointed secretary; and the parastatal public administration, consisting of decentralized public entities such as state-controlled enterprises and public trusteeships.

==== Legislative branch ====
The legislative branch consists of the unicameral Congress of Nuevo León, which is composed of 42 deputies, with 26 elected through first-past-the-post voting and 16 through proportional representation.

==== Judicial branch ====
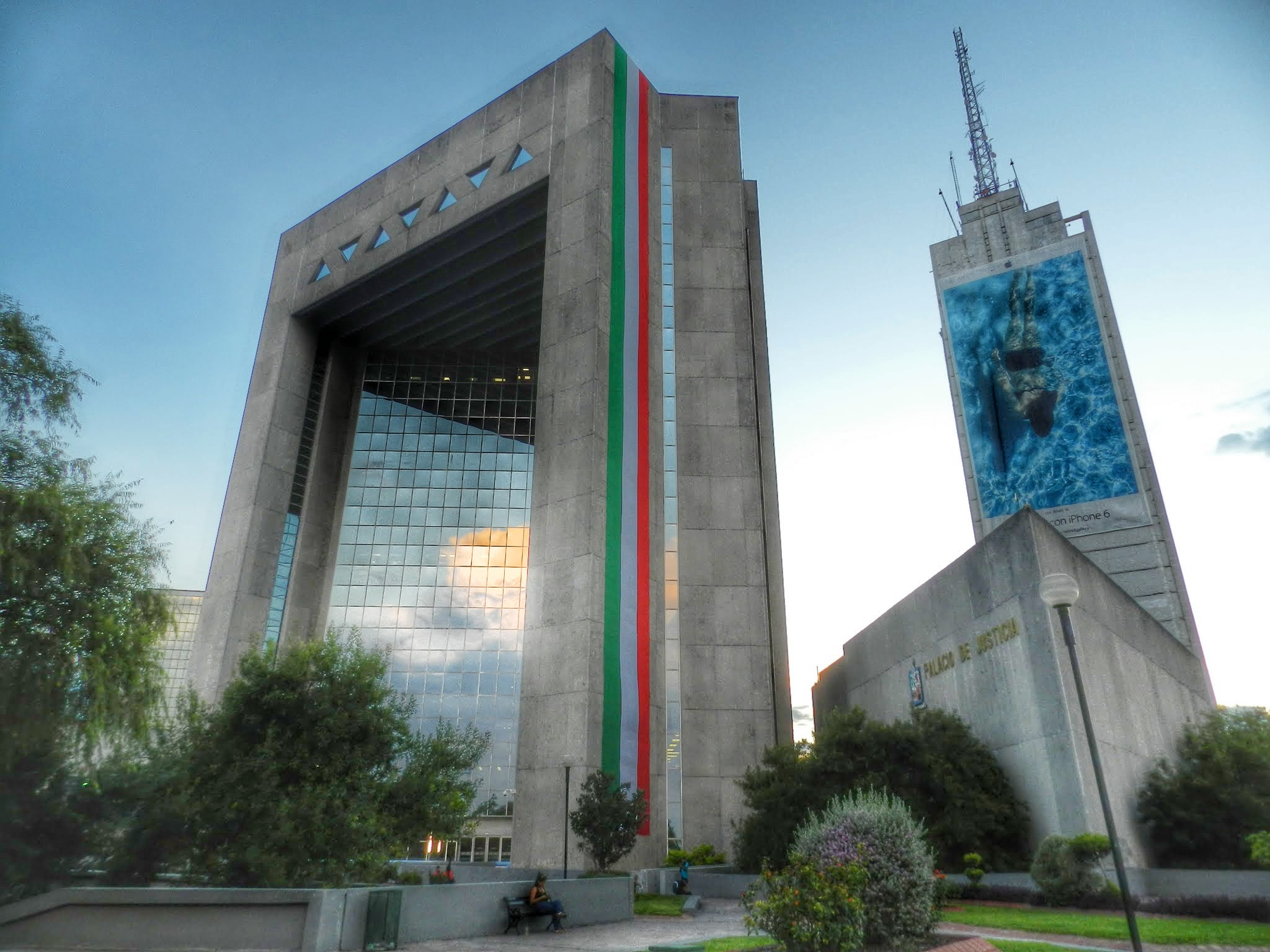
Building of the Superior Court of Justice of Nuevo León

Nuevo León's judicial branch serves two main functions: overseeing civil, family, criminal, and labor cases, and ensuring compliance with the constitution and federal laws. It comprises the Superior Court of Justice of Nuevo León, first-instance courts, and lower courts. As of 2023, the state is divided into fifteen judicial districts with a total of 140 judges.

The Superior Court of Justice of Nuevo León consists of 16 magistrates who are appointed by the Congress of Nuevo León, requiring a two-thirds supermajority for their election. The Superior Court of Justice is headed by a president, who is elected by the magistrates, for a renewable two-year term.

The administration of the court system is controlled by the Judicial Council, composed of the president of the Superior Court of Justice, two judges chosen by the Superior Court of Justice, one representative chosen by the governor, and one representative chosen by the Congress of Nuevo León.

=== Federal representation ===
Under the 2023 districting plan, Nuevo León elects 14 deputies to the Chamber of Deputies. The state is part of the second electoral region for proportional representation, which is headquartered in Monterrey.

Nuevo León is represented in the Senate of the Republic by Waldo Fernández González, Blanca Judith Díaz Delgado, and Luis Donaldo Colosio Riojas.

== Sports ==
In Nuevo León there is a wide diversity of sports that are practiced with great relevance.

The most practiced sport in the State has been baseball. It is home to the Sultanes de Monterrey, a professional baseball team with the longest history in the Mexican League, who have won ten championships since their founding in 1939. The Estadio Mobil Super is the largest baseball stadium in Mexico. In addition, its children's teams have been world champions in 1957, 1958 and 1997 in the Little League World Series.

Since the 1980s, association football has begun to gain popularity in the State after gaining followers among society. The oldest team is the C.F. Monterrey (popularly known as the Rayados), who have won the Liga MX on 5 occasions, in addition to 5 Concacaf Champions Leagues -three of them consecutively-, and 3 Cups for a total of 13 championships. For its part, Tigres UANL, the first team from Nuevo León to win a tournament, has 16 titles, including 8 League titles, 3 Cup titles and 1 Concacaf Champions League. The Clásico Regiomontano is considered one of the most anticipated matches of the season, and this is due to the already deep-rooted rivalry between Tigres and Monterrey for the honor of being the best team in the State or the luxurious squads with which they count. Both clubs have had confrontations in decisive matches, such as the two finals they faced, in 2017 and 2019. It is well known that fans each year wait in line for days outside both stadiums to get tickets, which are often priced at two or three times their original value.

Nuevo León also has a professional basketball team, with the Fuerza Regia de Monterrey squad as the greatest exponent that participates in the Liga Nacional de Baloncesto Profesional (LNBP). They play at the Gimnasio Nuevo León. In 2004, it hosted the first WNBA game outside the United States between the Detroit Shock and the San Antonio Silver Stars.

Ice hockey has shown notable growth in the state, although it is less popular than other more popular sports such as soccer or baseball. The state of Nuevo León has a professional team associated with the recent Mexican Hockey Federation, the Toros Monterrey, whose headquarters are the Monterrey Ice Complex ice rink, in Santa Catarina.

Influenced by the proximity to the U.S., American football is another popular sport. The Autonomous University of Nuevo León, with the Auténticos Tigres, and the Monterrey Institute of Technology and Higher Education, with the Borregos Salvajes, are precursors of this sport in the country. The Auténticos play in the Organización Nacional Estudiantil de Fútbol Americano (ONEFA), and are based at the Estadio Gaspar Mass. While the Borregos play in the Comisión Nacional Deportiva Estudiantil de Instituciones Privadas (CONADEIP), and are based at the Estadio Borregos.

== Media ==
Newspapers and news websites of Nuevo León include: ABC Noticias, El Gráfico de Nuevo León, El Norte, El Porvenir, La Última Palabra, Milenio, Publimetro edición Monterrey, Reporte Índigo, Distrito Regio, Solo Ofertas, El Horizonte, Regio.com, Red Crucero, Noticias Nuevo León.

== Twinning and covenants ==
The state has agreements with other states, provinces, regions and autonomous communities.

- Quebec
- Texas
- Catalonia
- Lombardy, Italy
- State of Mexico, Mexico
- Jalisco, Mexico

== See also ==
- Fiestas of Nuevo León
- History of Nuevo León
- Sierra de Picachos

== Sources ==
- Human Development Report for Mexico 2002
- Historia de Nuevo León by Israel Cavazos (in Spanish)
- Enciclopedia de los Municipios de México (in Spanish)
- Comisión Estatal Electoral de Nuevo León (in Spanish)
- Ley Estatal Electoral de Nuevo León, 1996 (in Spanish)
