= Coat of arms of Nuevo León =

Coat of Arms of Nuevo León

Versions
- Armiger: State of Nuevo León
- Adopted: 2 June 1944
- Motto: Semper Ascendens

The Coat of arms of Nuevo León (Spanish: Escudo de Nuevo León, lit. "state shield of New Leon") is a symbol of the Free and Sovereign State of Nuevo León in Mexico. Was adopted on 2 June 1943.

== Symbolism ==
The shield is quartered with a small shield and a border. First, in a gold field, the Cerro de la Silla and on its summit a red sun, and in the foreground an orange tree in fruit; second, in a silver field, a rampant lion of red, crowned, lampasado and armed with gold; third, on a silver background and in natural colors, the old temple of San Francisco; fourth, in a gold field, five smoking chimneys, sable. On a small shield in a silver field, a sable chain around and a band of the same color. The azure border contains different weapons, all in silver; above are three golden bees on each side and below the name of the State of Nuevo León. Above the shield is a burnished, three-sided silver helmet with five grids. At the foot of the shield is a ribbon with the national colors, and the Latin phrase “Semper Ascendens” (Always Ascending) is written in sable letters, handwritten in the 16th century.

=== Elements ===
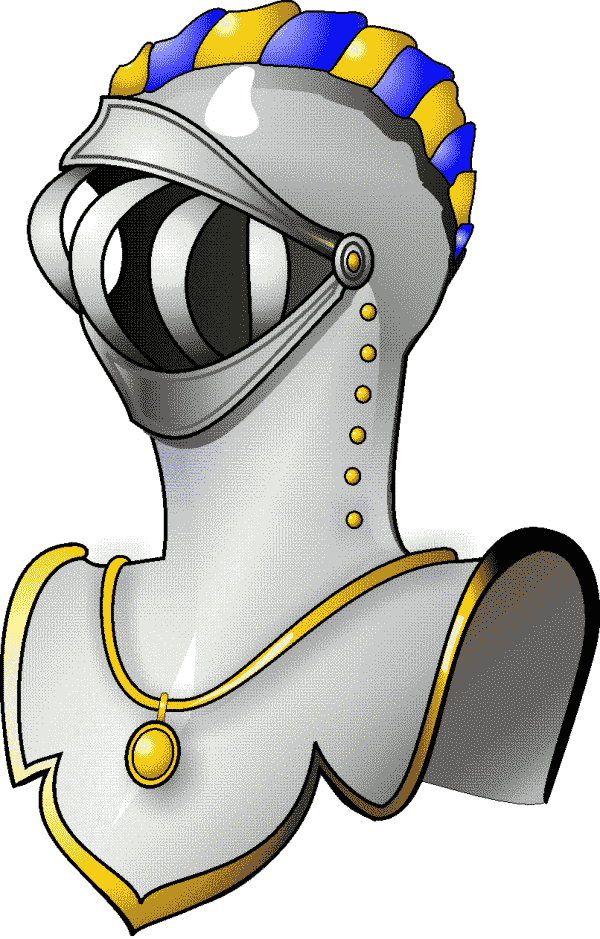
The helmet, there are three-sided silver helmet with five grids, symbol reserved for members of the nobility.

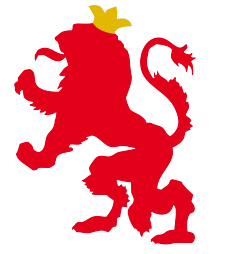
The lion, is the representations of the Kingdom of León in Castile, under the effigy of the monarchs is one lion passing in an attitude of attack and their color is red with a crown.

== History ==
The coat of arms of Nuevo León was created by a commission on June 2, 1943. Before its creation, the state used the coat of arms of the city of Monterrey, the state capital.

The Monterrey artist Ignacio Martínez Rendón was in charge of painting this coat of arms in oil, which is located in the Government Palace located in the capital.

=== Historical coats ===
The symbol is used by all successive regimes in different forms.

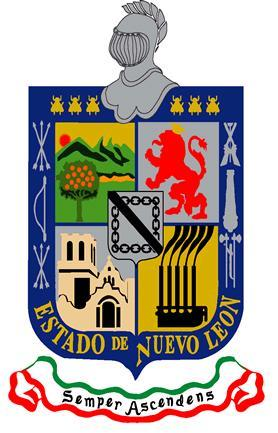
Coat of arms from 1979.

== See also ==
- Nuevo León
- Coat of arms of Mexico
