= Grupo Garza Ponce =

Mexican construction company

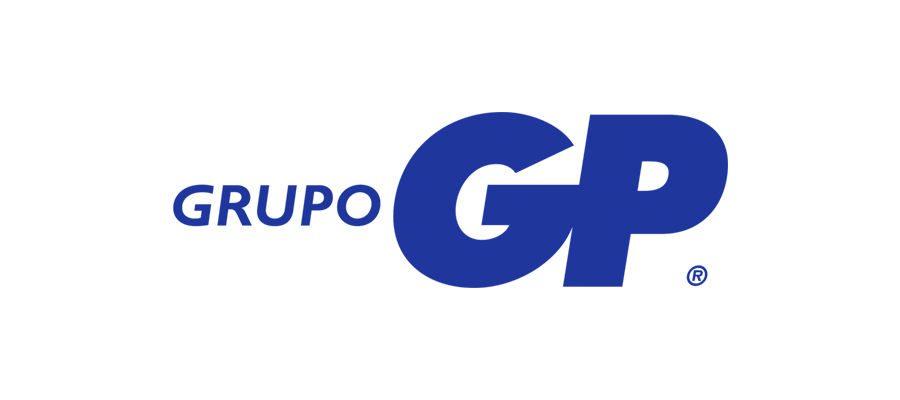
- Type: Private
- Industry: Construction
- Founded: August 1, 1966; 60 years ago
- Headquarters: Monterrey, Nuevo León, Mexico
- Number of locations: 18 of 31 Mexican states
- Area served: Mexico
- Key people: José María Garza Ponce (Founder); José María Garza Treviño (President)
- Number of employees: 4,154 (2008)
- Divisions: 7
- Website: www.grupogp.com.mx

Grupo Garza Ponce is a Mexican construction company based in Monterrey, Nuevo León. It was founded in 1966 by civil engineer José María Garza Ponce after he decided to take advantage of the boom in public works that Mexico was experiencing during that time. In the early 1980s, the company nearly went out of business due to the country's debt crisis; during that decade, they built the first private industrial park in Nuevo León, and later tapped into different markets by partnering with transnational companies in multimillion-dollar construction projects. They are currently one of the largest construction firms in Mexico and one of the leading ones in the northern part of the country.

In the early 2000s, Grupo Garza Ponce had a strong business relationship with the Institutional Revolutionary Party (PRI) based in Nuevo León, which granted them opportunities to participate in several construction projects, including the Puente de la Unidad bridge and the expansion of the Monterrey Metro. In the 2010s, they constructed industrial park projects in Nuevo León, the Mexico City Arena, and the football stadium Estadio BBVA Bancomer, home of Mexican top division team C.F. Monterrey. It was also part of the bidding process for the New International Airport for Mexico City.

== Foundation and profile ==
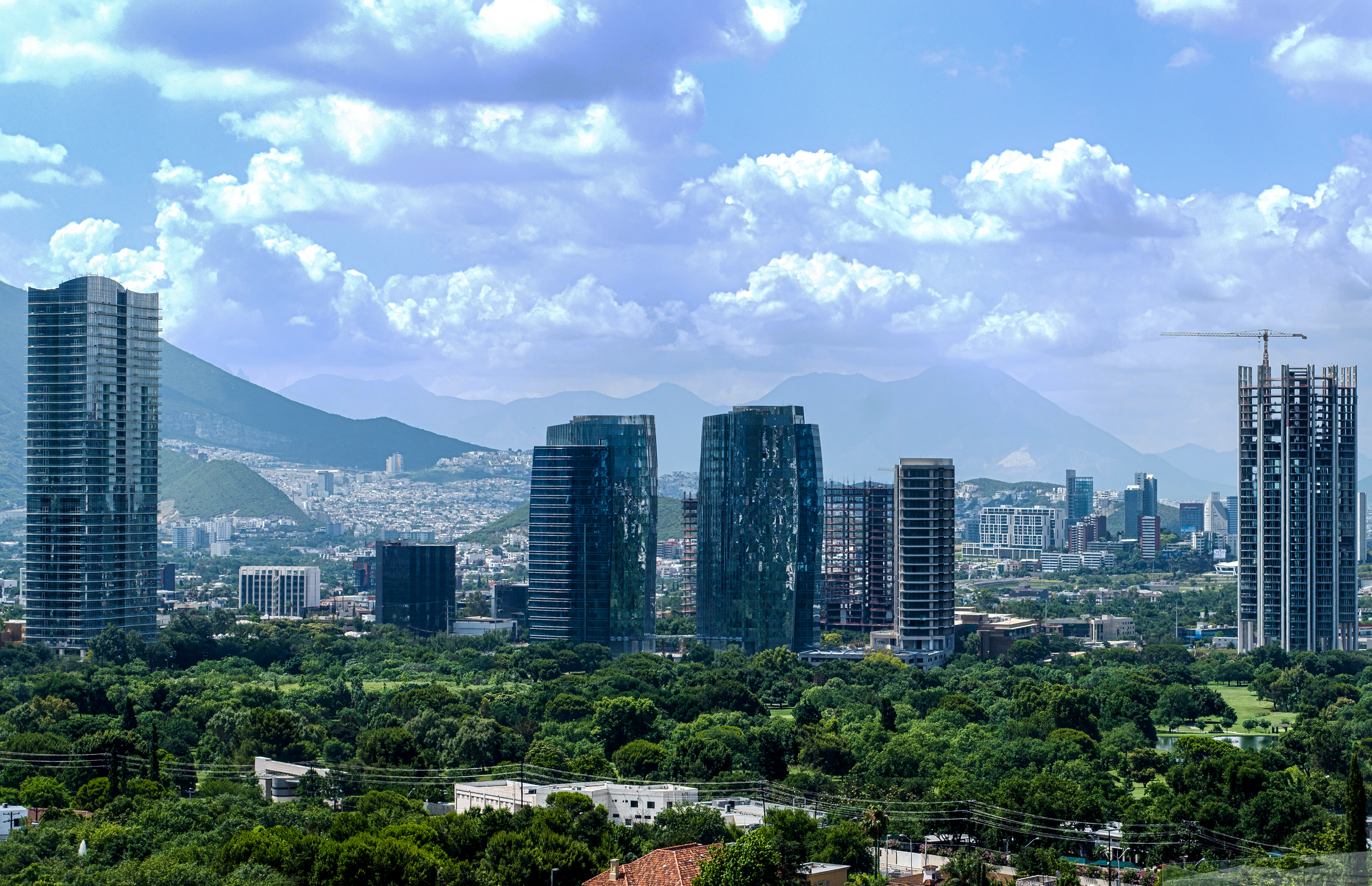
View of Monterrey, Nuevo León, the city where Grupo Garza Ponce was founded and is headquartered

Grupo Garza Ponce was founded on August 1, 1966, under the name "Constructora Garza Ponce" in Monterrey, Nuevo León, Mexico. The company was founded by José María Garza Ponce, a Mexican civil engineer who used to work as a contractor for companies in the United States. He decided to create the company to take advantage of the boom of public works in Mexico.

In the 1980s, Grupo Garza Ponce nearly went out of business due to the 1982 debt crisis; the prices that the company paid for its supplies were fluctuating by between 10 and 12%, and according to José María Garza Treviño, the President of Grupo Garza Ponce, this forced the company to change its business model each month. Grupo Garza Ponce experienced a huge loss in personnel, but they were able to recuperate by tapping different markets and forging business projects with transnational companies. During the 1980s, Grupo Garza Ponce consolidated their services into 6 different business units: GP Construcción, GP Desarrollos, GP Servicios, GP Vivienda, GP Residencial, GP Asfaltos y Precolados. The last one was later broken down into two separate entities, GP Precolados and GP Concreto Asfáltico. With the economic crisis, demand for public works declined in northern Mexico; this forced Grupo Garza Ponce to close agreements with companies in the private sector.

In 2007, Grupo Garza Ponce received an international standard certificate from the International Organization for Standardization (ISO). The certificate stated that they were compliant with the requirements mentioned in the ISO 9000:2008 quality management systems version. In 2008, they had grown to 4,154 employees. Garza Treviño told the press that year that Grupo Garza Ponce had 10,000,000 square metres (110,000,000 sq ft) of constructions across Mexico, including 60 apartment complexes and 45,000 houses. He said their goal was to expand throughout all of Mexico and have market share from Tijuana (in the northwest) to Playa del Carmen (in the southeast). In 2009, they obtained a socially responsible business certificate (es) from the Mexican Center for Philanthropy (Cemefi) for following certain sustainability and quality procedures.

In 2013, Grupo Garza Ponce changed its operational structure and began to explore other revenue streams besides public works, which were on the decline in Mexico. When the company was first founded, it depended almost entirely on public work projects. However, as urban construction was slowed down in Mexico, Grupo Garza Ponce was able to diversify its services. By 2014, the company experienced 30% growth by taking over construction plans that involved parks and automobile plants. Among their major clients included General Motors, Faurecia, Whirlpool, Nokia, BMW, and Banco de México. By 2016, only 15% of the company's revenue came from public works. According to Grupo Garza Ponce's executive team, the mid 2010s was a "boom" era for Nuevo León's industrial growth.

The company is headquartered in Monterrey. In the 2010s, it had offices in 18 of the 31 states in Mexico. The states were Baja California, Baja California Sur, Coahuila, Chihuahua, Durango, State of Mexico, Guanajuato, Guerrero, Jalisco, Nuevo León, San Luis Potosí, Sinaloa, Sonora, Tabasco, Tamaulipas, Querétaro, Quintana Roo, and Veracruz. They also have a presence in Mexico City. The states where Grupo Garza Ponce is not present are Aguascalientes, Campeche, Chiapas, Colima, Hidalgo, Michoacán, Morelos, Nayarit, Oaxaca, Puebla, Tlaxcala, Yucatán, and Zacatecas.

== Construction projects ==
=== 1960s–2010 ===
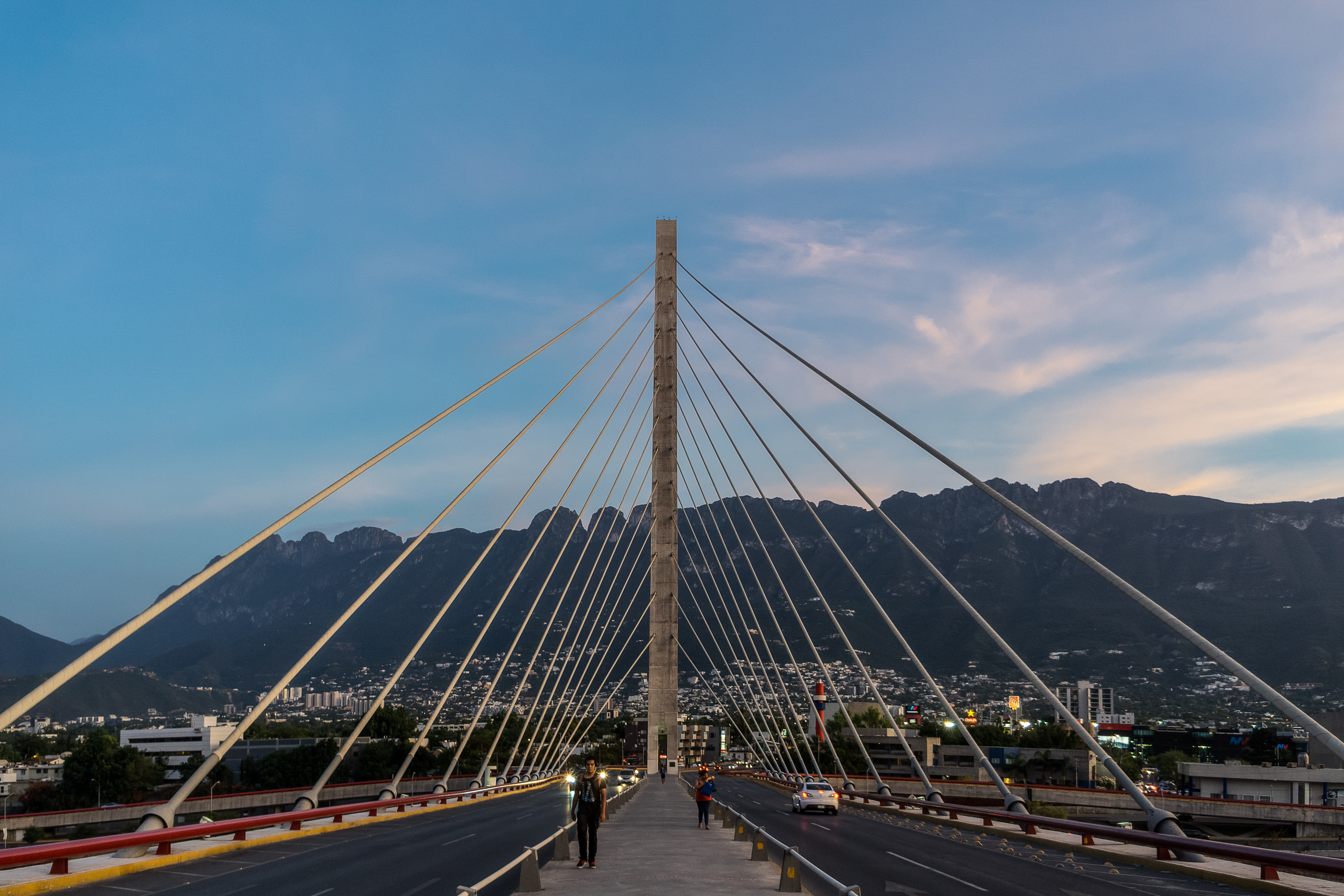
Pedestrian crossing view of Puente de la Unidad, a 2003 construction of Grupo Garza Ponce

The first construction of Grupo Garza Ponce was in 1968, when they created the Central de Abastos, the central supply center and wholesale market of Monterrey. In 1973, they partnered with Mexico's National Housing Fund for Workers (INFONAVIT) and created several houses and neighborhoods in Nuevo León. In 1978, Grupo Garza Ponce was responsible for the construction of the Abastos Estrella market in Monterrey. Two years later, they constructed the Galerías Monterrey, a major retail shop in the city. During the 1980s, they created the Monterrey Industrial Park, the state's first private industrial park. In 1982, they constructed Mexican Social Security Institute (IMSS) #33 in Monterrey.

In May 1993, Grupo Garza Ponce partnered with Koll Company, a US-based construction company, to expand the facilities of the Monterrey Industrial Park and other areas in northeastern Mexico. Koll Company was doing this development pact via two of its business units, Koll International-Commercial, headquartered in Newport Beach, California, and Koll Company's Southwest division, based out of Dallas, Texas. Koll Company subdivision Koll Cushman Realty Mexico was also working to establish a stronghold in Mexico to help foreign companies looking to move to Mexico to open manufacturing facilities. In 1994, Grupo Garza Ponce partnered with Kohler in Mexico to create a 55,000 square metres (590,000 sq ft) sanitary production facility.

In 1995, they partnered with Denso and constructed a 2,700 square metres (29,000 sq ft) automobile production facility in Apodaca, Nuevo León. Three years later, they announced a partnership with Prologis, and both of them constructed several industrial areas totaling 48,000 square metres (520,000 sq ft) in Mexico. In 2000, they partnered with Nokia to create an industrial park in Reynosa, Tamaulipas, of 6,500 square metres (70,000 sq ft). The following year, they worked with LG Electronics in Apodaca, where they constructed a 26,000 square metres (280,000 sq ft) industrial park. In 2003, Grupo Garza Ponce was chosen from a pool of 40 Mexican companies to create the Puente de la Unidad, a bridge in Monterrey.

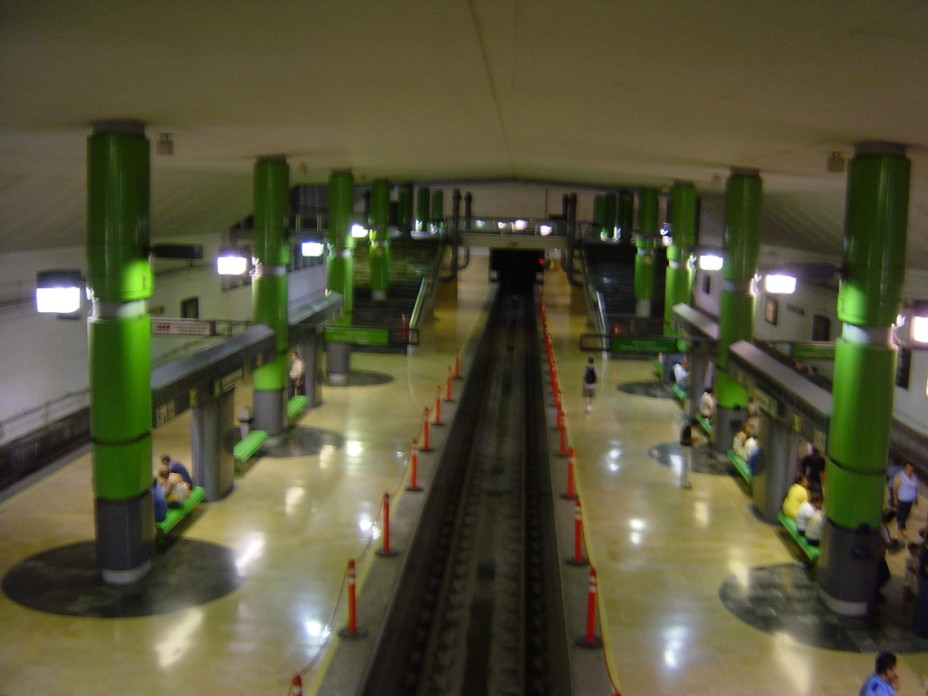
Interior view of Line 2 substation of Monterrey Metro, one of Grupo Garza Ponce's constructions

Between 2003 and 2009, Grupo Garza Ponce enjoyed a strong relationship with the Nuevo León government under the Institutional Revolutionary Party (PRI). Javier González Parás, the brother of former governor José Natividad González Parás, was a stakeholder of the company. He was involved with foreign companies like Bombardier and Siemens in several construction projects. The cost of this construction was estimated to be MXN$3.5 billion. Opposition party National Action Party (PAN) criticized the PRI for favoring Grupo Garza Ponce and the governor's brother. They said that Garza Treviño negotiated lower project costs to win the bid. Garza Treviño and Javier were linked to a bar known as Far West Rodeo, which was located in San Nicolás de los Garza, Nuevo León, and in San Antonio, Texas. In August 2005, Grupo Garza Ponce, Bombardier, and Siemens won the bid for the construction of Line 2 of Monterrey Metro, which was planned to be 8.4 kilometres (5.2 mi) long and span across seven different metro stations. The metro was opened to the public in October 2007. Two years later, they worked with Whirlpool to construct a 600,000 cubic metres (21,000,000 cu ft) facility in Mexico that helped facilitate the transportation logistics of the company.

In 2010, Grupo Garza Ponce, along with Mexico's ambassador to Uruguay, Felipe Enríquez Hernández, signed a document requesting for power over the administration of 49 hectares (120 acres) of land owned by Desarrollos Punta Piedra, a company based in Tulum, Quintana Roo. According to documents in possession of the Garza Ponce family, the land was bought by them and Schiavon Magaña, another Monterrey-based businessman, in the 1950s. The land had several hotels and ejido farming units off the peninsula coast. Grupo Garza Ponce had the power to order the evacuation of hotels and farmers under the new decree. The company intended to use the land for construction expansions, but several farmers from the area opposed the projects proposed by Grupo Garza Ponce. Locals claimed that the documents that the Nuevo León businessmen had were fake, while Grupo Garza Ponce insisted that they were authentic. One of the lawyers handling the case on the farmers' behalf was murdered at his office by an unidentified assailant. Several farmers believed that the lawyer was killed for taking this land dispute to court. Grupo Garza Ponce and several businessmen and politicians tied to the lands were able to expropriate them by 2017.

=== 2011–2015 ===
In December 2011, Grupo Garza Ponce built a facility for the San Pedro Garza García, Nuevo León, municipal police force in Valle Oriente (es). The contract was valued at MXN$19.6 million, and the local government agreed to pay the company around MXN$1.6 million every month for the course of 15 years, totaling 180 monthly payments. The monthly payments stated did not include the mandatory value-added tax charged, as this number is decided by Mexico's National Institute of Statistics and Geography's (INEGI) consumer price index branch. Fernando Fuentes Urbieta, director at Grupo Garza Ponce, stated that these sorts of agreement between construction companies and local governments were becoming prevalent in Mexico, as municipal authorities usually did not have large sums of capital for these types of investments. In an interview with the press in March 2014, local newspapers from San Pedro Garza García began circulating rumors that Grupo Garza Ponce was overcharging the local police force on these monthly installments. Fuentes Urbieta clarified to the press that these rumors were false and that his company was only charging the police what was stipulated in the contract.

In February 2012, they finished the construction of the Mexico City Arena, a project where several Mexican constructions firms participated to create a 8,300 square metres (89,000 sq ft) arena. In April 2012, Grupo Garza Ponce constructed industrial facilities for Embraco and Magna International in Apodaca and San Luis Potosí respectively. According to Garza Treviño, the company expected to grow between 8 and 10% that year. In 2011, Grupo Garza Ponce grew 15%. In 2010, the company experienced 20% in growth. In 2009, however, the company's growth dropped 25% when compared to 2008, which was one of the company's best growth years. Garza Treviño explained that 2012 was expected to be one of their best years because there was a large industrial output in Central Mexico, and that international companies like Mazda and Honda were planning to open industrial plants in Mexico. He also stated that Grupo Garza Ponce was involved in the construction of an inland port and industrial park in Apodaca, a residential tower in Valle Oriente, an IMSS hospital, a football stadium, and several other expansions across the Santa Catarina River. That year, Grupo Garza Ponce was the eighth biggest construction firm in Mexico, and one of the leading ones in the northern part of the country.

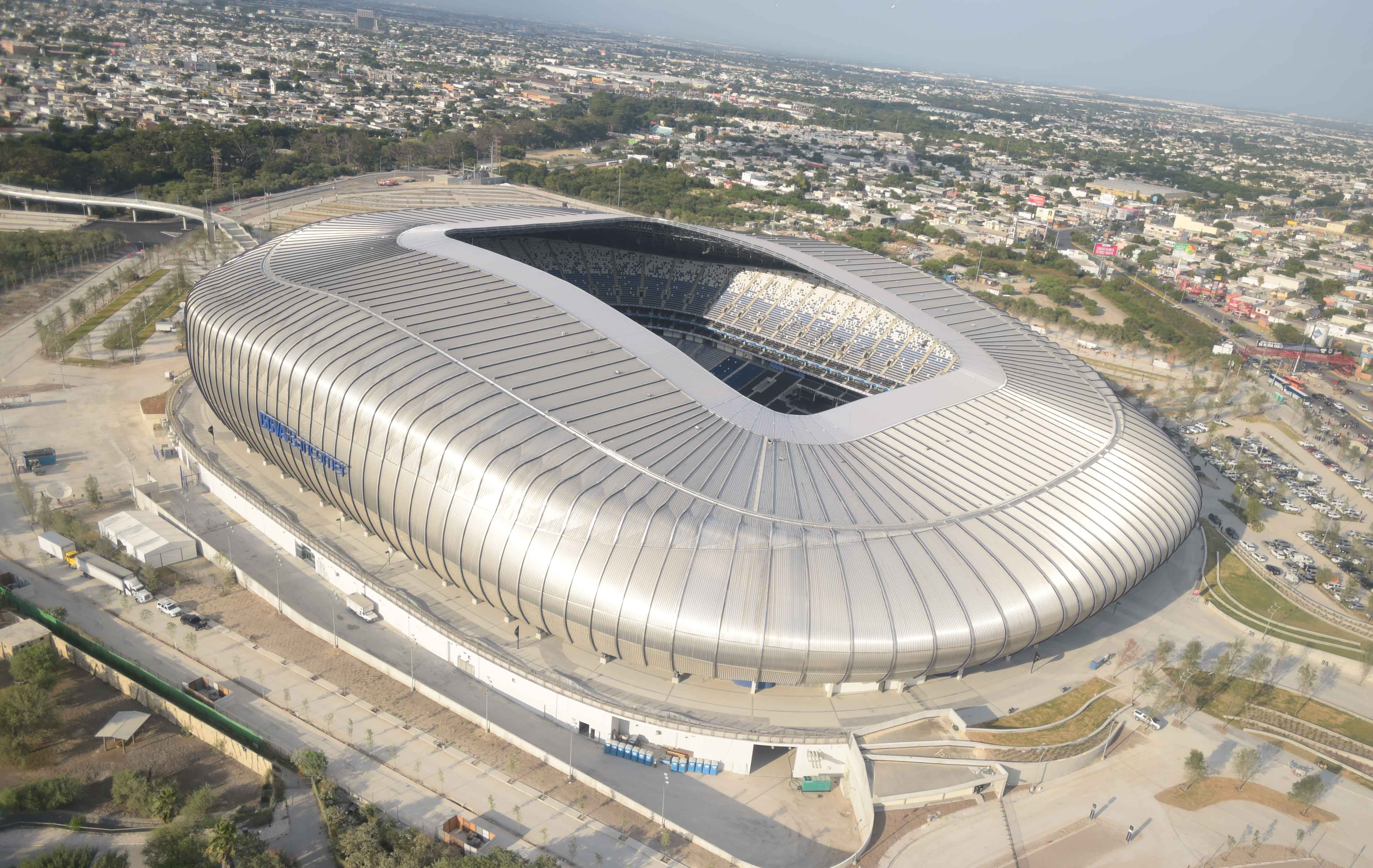
Aerial photo of Estadio BBVA Bancomer, a 2015 construction of Grupo Garza Ponce

In April 2013, they built the Roberto Garza Sada Center in the University of Monterrey. This was the first Tadao Ando Japanese architecture construction in Mexico. In October 2013, Grupo Garza Ponce announced that they were selling 29 industrial parks and 4 territorial reservation areas totaling US$274.8 million to Fibra Uno, a Mexican real estate investment firm. This decision was part of a partnership agreement they had with US-based real estate firm Clarion Partners. Fibra Uno agreed to inherit a US$74.3 million debt and pay US$200.5 million in trust certificates. Garza Treviño explained that as part of the trust law, Grupo Garza Ponce and Clarion Partners owned half of the assets that were sold, which meant that each part was to receive US$137.4 million for the transaction. Garza Treviño stated that the money would be used to construct two additional industrial parks. Fibra Uno's general director Gonzalo Robina clarified that of the 29 industrial parks acquired, 14 of them were in Nuevo León, 13 were in either Chihuahua and Tamaulipas, one in San Luis Potosí, and another one—valued at US$50 million, the highest of the transaction—was in Saltillo, Coahuila.

In 2013, Grupo Garza Ponce participated in the construction of Mexican football team C.F. Monterrey's stadium Estadio BBVA Bancomer. They worked alongside another Mexican construction company, Aceros Lozano, and two major steel and cement, Villacero (de) and Cemex, respectively. Regarded by the Mexican press as the "most modern stadium in Latin America", Estadio BBVA Bancomer required 6,000 tons of steel and 49,000 tons of concrete. The construction of the stadium experienced several delays from DeAcero, one of the steel supplies. Garza Treviño explained that the delays had nothing to do with Grupo Garza Ponce, and clarified that their employees and projects were in line with the timeline. The stadium's construction was first announced in 2008 and was expected to be finished by 2011. The end date was pushed off multiple times by other contractors until the stadium was finally constructed in its entirety in 2015.

In February 2014, Grupo Garza Ponce invested US$60 million for two industrial parks in Apodaca and Escobedo, Nuevo León. About US$30 million was destined for each park. The Escobedo park was in Nueva Castilla sector and intended to be 85 hectares (210 acres). The one in Apodaca, known as La Concordia, was intended to be 60 hectares (150 acres). Grupo Garza Ponce decided to make this investment after a growing demand for an urban concept that included an industrial park with business offices, daycare centers, hospitals, and stores. The project was broken down into three segments: industrial, offices, and commercial spaces. 70% of the investment was destined to the industrial expansion. For the commercial expansion, Grupo Garza Ponce announced that they were partnering with Soriana and Grupo Acosta Verde. Soriana agreed to create two shopping centers in Apodaca and Cadereyta, Nuevo León; Grupo Acosta Verde agreed to create a Walmart shopping center in Juárez. When the constructed started, Grupo Garza Ponce made a US$14 million initial investment in infrastructure and land, with an expected US$6 million on top of that. That same month, the company announced that they were entering the second construction phase of a 100 hectares (250 acres) industrial park in Aguascalientes for Nissan and other Japanese firms.

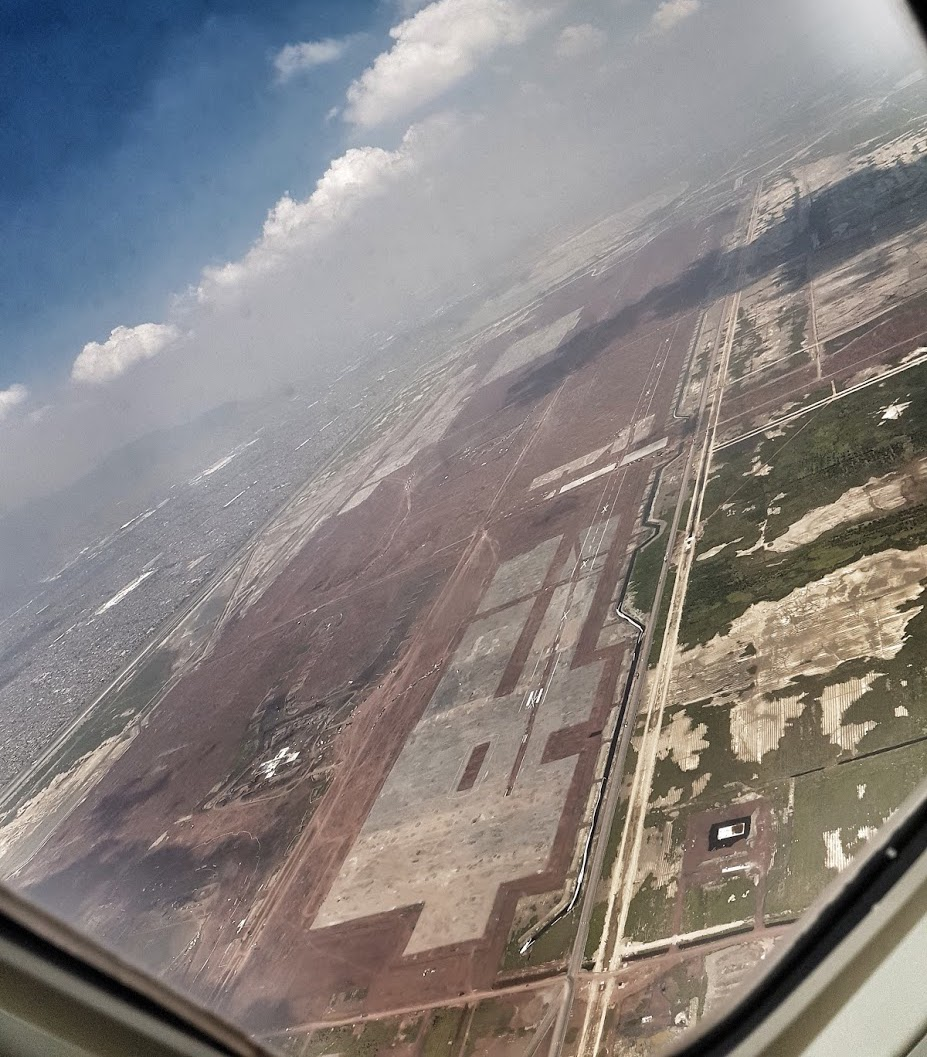
Aerial photo of Mexico City's New International Airport site, a construction bid in which Grupo Garza Ponce was involved in 2017

In October 2014, Mexico's Industrial Construction Chamber announced that Grupo Garza Ponce was among the bidders for the construction of Mexico City's New International Airport. In the bidding process were other construction companies based in Nuevo León, Jalisco, and State of Mexico. This new construction was intended to take place next to the Mexico City International Airport, which was needed additional space to reduce traffic saturation. The design of the new airport was done by Norman Foster, the owner of Foster and Partners, along with Mexican architect Fernando Romero, relative of Mexican billionaire Carlos Slim. Slim's construction company Grupo Carso was also among the bidders. The value of the project was estimated to be at around US$9.12 billion. Mexico's Secretary of Communications and Transportation Gerardo Ruiz Esparza stated that the government of President Enrique Peña Nieto (2012–2018) likely going to pick a foreign construction company with experience in airport construction for this project. He stated that the company would work with domestic firms like Grupo Garza Ponce or others to build the new airport.

In December 2014, they started building an underground children's ecological and environmental museum in Fundidora Park. The construction was approximately 10,000 square metres (110,000 sq ft) and cost around MXN$500 million pesos. 40% of this amount was paid by the Federal Government of Mexico, while an additional 5% was granted by the Nuevo León government. Construction was expected to finish by the first half of 2015, but delays pushed off the inauguration. In June 2017, the museum was opened to the public. The museum was awarded a Leadership in Energy and Environmental Design (LEED) certificate for having a sustainable energy and carbon-saving building.

In August 2015, Garza Treviño attended a meeting at the Chamber of Real Estate Owners (Caprobi) in Monterrey to discuss a plan Grupo Garza Ponce had to develop a statewide urban plan with the Government of Nuevo León. Among the attendees was the Governor Jaime Rodríguez Calderón. Grupo Garza Ponce stated that Nuevo León needed an urban development plan that was uniform throughout all of its municipalities. Under this proposed plan, municipalities had to work in conjunction with the state government and other municipalities to guarantee uniformity; municipalities would be allowed to exercise certain authorities and regulations without approvals from the state. Grupo Garza Ponce stated that the problem was that each municipality in the state had their own agenda for urban planning.

== Ongoing and future projects ==
In June 2016, JAOS & SGB, a company owned by Grupo Garza Ponce, took on a construction project for Toyota's branch in the Americas. The project consisted of building a 607 hectares (1,500 acres) assembly plant in Apaseo el Grande, Guanajuato. Grupo Gara Ponce owned 200 hectares (490 acres) of land. According to the contract, JAOS & SGB bought 1 hectare (2.5 acres) for MXN$180,000 each, and sold them for MXN$1.45 million each to Government of Guanajuato under Miguel Márquez Márquez. The local ejido owners complained that some of the land originally owned by them was bought through illegal means. The Party of the Democratic Revolution (PRD) criticized Grupo Garza Ponce and stated that they believed the company had insider information that allowed them to make strategic purchases. The Government of Guanajuato stated that Grupo Garza Ponce's purchases and sales were legal.

In April 2017, Grupo Garza Ponce, along with Mexican firms Vynmsa, Banco Base, Grupo Prodens, Clúster Automotriz (Claut), and Clúster de Electrodomésticos, traveled to Asia to attract investment from countries like Japan, China, and South Korea. They met with investors in a variety of business sectors to discuss the investment opportunities in Nuevo León's small-and-medium business environment. In China, they met in Beijing, Hangzhou, and Qingdao. In South Korea, they attended the Seoul Motor Show, and attended investment info sessions in Busan and Seoul. In Japan, the Mexican group met in Tokyo with the Japan Bank for International Cooperation (JBIC) and Mizuho Bank.

Grupo Garza Ponce, alongside Mexican construction firm Abitat, is working on the construction of an industrial facility for Michelin, an international tire manufacturer, at the Industrial Park León Bajío (PILBA) in León, Guanajuato, Though initially expected to conclude in 2018, delays in construction and supplies pushed the inauguration date to the first quarter of 2019. The role of Grupo Garza Ponce in the project is to place the base construction structures for Michelin's facility. Abitat is responsible for the overall construction of the facility. The total value of the project is US$510 million; Michelin is expected to produce between 3 and 4 million tires in the first year. The project is expected to be one of the biggest in the state and the most important one for León's industrial sector.

== See also ==
- List of companies of Mexico
