= PROFECO =

Mexican consumer rights agency

Federal Consumer Protection Agency
- Procuraduría Federal del Consumidor
- Official logo

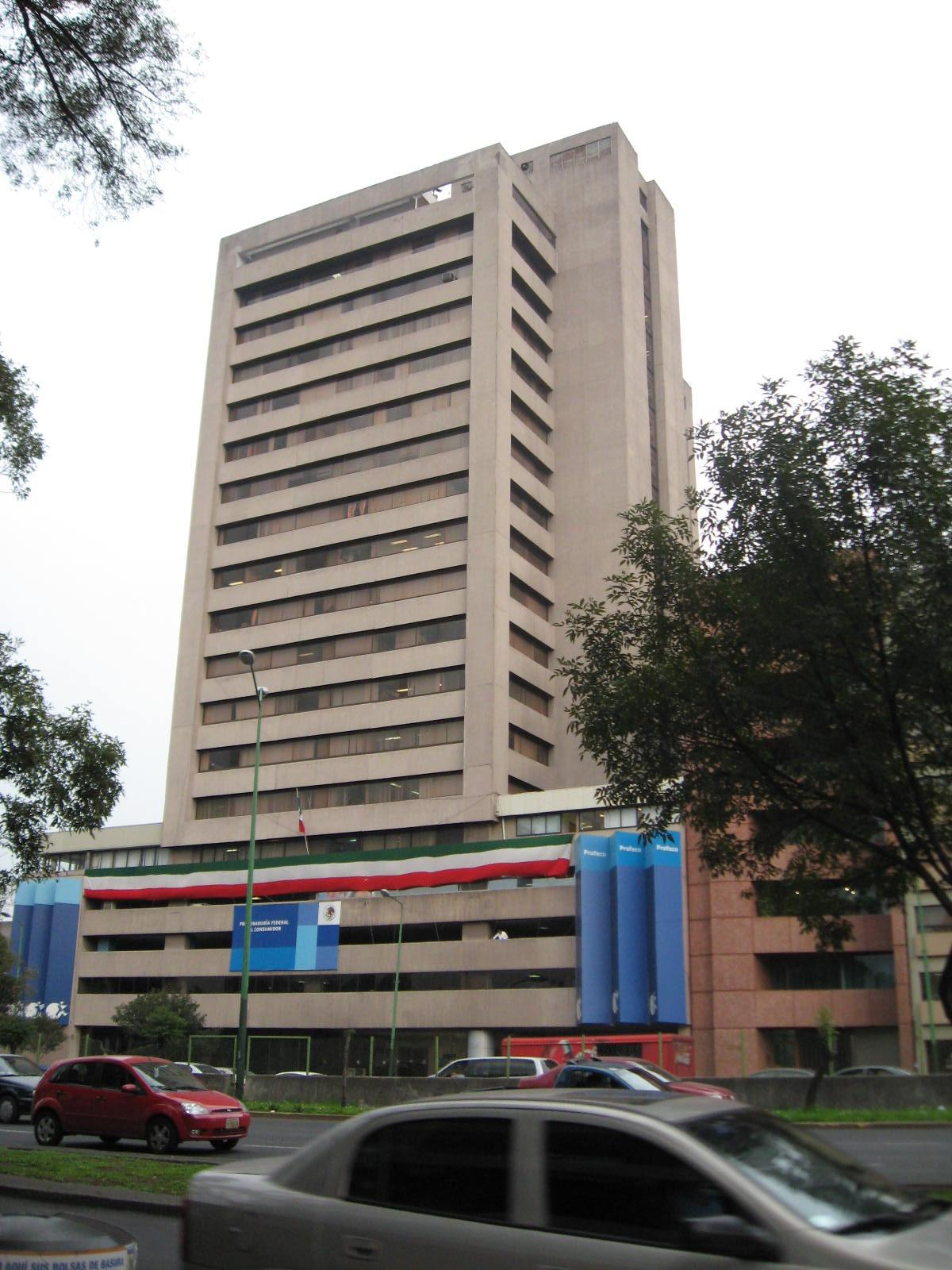
- Offices in Mexico City

Agency overview
- Formed: February 5, 1976; 50 years ago
- Jurisdiction: Federal government of Mexico
- Headquarters: Avenida José Vasconcelos 208, Colonia Condesa, Cuauhtémoc, 06140 Mexico City, Mexico; 19°24′48.6″N 99°10′49.9″W
- Website: www.gob.mx/profeco

The Procuraduría Federal del Consumidor (PROFECO; Federal Consumer Protection Agency) is an agency of the Mexican government headed by the federal consumer attorney. Mexico became the second Latin American country to enact a federal consumer protection law on February 5, 1976, and later became the first to establish a dedicated consumer protection agency. By 1982, the agency had 32 offices, one in each federative entity of Mexico. PROFECO now has 51 offices nationwide, and its main headquarters are in Mexico City. The most recent reform to the federal law was signed by President Enrique Peña Nieto in early 2018.

PROFECO works with organizations such as the U.S. Consumer Product Safety Commission and Health Canada to help ensure that imported products are safe for consumers. In February 2018, representatives of the three agencies met in the United States to sign a memorandum of understanding (MOU). Through this agreement, the three countries committed to improving the safety and quality of imported products for consumers in North and South America. PROFECO was represented at the meeting by attorney Rogelio Cerda Pérez, who had served as federal consumer attorney since August 2017.

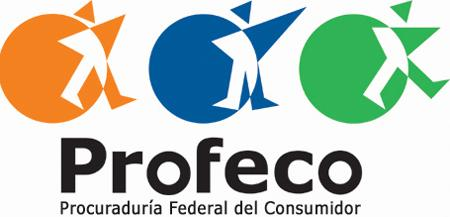
PROFECO's previous logo

== Objectives ==
- Protect consumers against abuses or fraud by companies operating in Mexico.
- Provide information to help consumers make good decisions when they need to buy products.
- Inform the community about their rights and obligations as consumers.
- Create and put in practice new methods to provide prompt attention for consumer complaints.

== Programs ==
- The Good Weekend (El Buen Fin): a shopping weekend intended to stimulate the economy by encouraging consumption
- Who is Who on the Prices (Quien es Quien en los Precios (QQP)): PROFECO collects information about prices of products that consumers buy regularly. They make a list comparing the prices of these products at different stores, and share this information with the consumers to help them decide where is the best place to buy.
- Consumer magazine: PROFECO has published this monthly magazine for more than 40 years. In this magazine consumers will find a wide variety of information about daily life, like comparison of products, recipes, studies and alerts.

== Current Commissioners ==
Name	Position	Sworn in
César Iván Escalante Ruiz	Federal consumer procurator	October 2024
Raymundo Rodríguez Diego	Verification Deputy Attorney	April 2017
Pedro Fernando Flamand Gutiérrez	General Coordinator of Administration	--
Omar Cervantes Rodríguez	General Director of Social Communication	October 2017
Rafael Ochoa Morales	Legal Deputy Attorney	March 2016
María de los Ángeles Jasso Cisneros	Deputy Attorney General	September 2017
Héctor Alejandro Gutiérrez Ordaz	General Director of Planning and Evaluation	November 2015
Carlos de Jesús Ponce Beltrán	Deputy Attorney for Telecommunications	September 2015
Juan Carlos Estefan Mafud	General Coordinator of Education and Dissemination	November 2017
Humberto Lepe Lepe	General Director of Delegations	August 2017

== See also ==
- United States–Mexico–Canada Agreement
- Canada–Mexico relations
- Mexico–United States relations
- Toy safety
- El Buen Fin
