= Juan Manuel Parás González =

Mexican politician (born 1956)

Member of the Chamber of Deputies for Nuevo León's 12th district
- In office 1 September 2006 – 31 August 2009
- Succeeded by: Rogelio Cerda Pérez

Member of the Chamber of Deputies for Nuevo León's 5th district
- In office 1 September 1997 – 31 August 2000
- Preceded by: Jesús Siller Rojas
- Succeeded by: Eloy Cantú Segovia

Personal details
- Born: 11 April 1956 (age 69) Nuevo León, Mexico
- Party: PRI
- Occupation: Politician

Juan Manuel Parás González (born 11 April 1956) is a Mexican politician affiliated with the Institutional Revolutionary Party (PRI). He has been elected to the federal Chamber of Deputies on two occasions: in the 1997 mid-terms, for Nuevo León's 5th district; and in the 2006 general election, for Nuevo León's 12th district.
