= Pedro Pablo Treviño Villarreal =

Mexican lawyer and politician

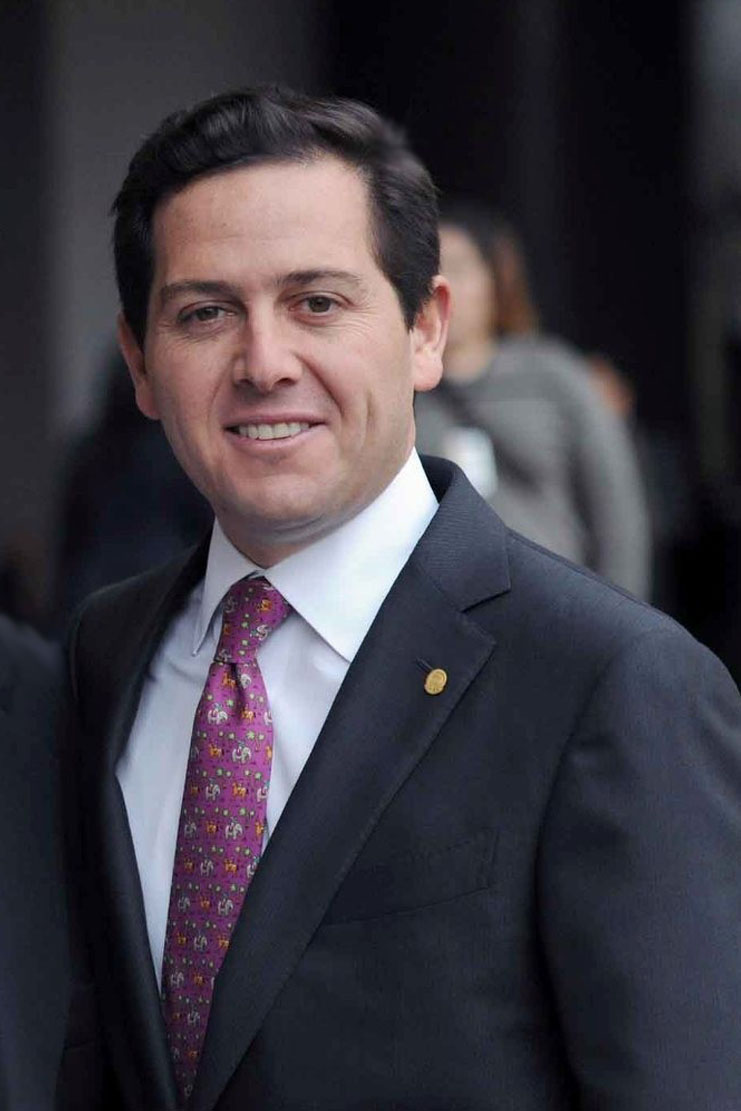

President of the PRI's State Steering Committee in Nuevo León
- In office September 1, 2017 – June 18, 2020
- Succeeded by: Heriberto Treviño Cantú

Managing Director of the Lotería Nacional para la Asistencia Pública and Pronósticos para la Asistencia Pública
- In office September 23, 2015 – September 1, 2017
- Preceded by: María Esther Scherman
- Succeeded by: Eugenio Garza Riva Palacio

Federal Deputy of the Congress of the Union from Nuevo León's 12th federal district
- In office August 29, 2012 – August 31, 2015
- Preceded by: Rogelio Cerda Perez
- Succeeded by: Edgar Romo García

Secretary of Labor of Nuevo León
- In office July 20, 2010 – February 7, 2012
- Preceded by: Alvaro Ibarra Hinojosa
- Succeeded by: Hector Morales Rivera

Personal details
- Born: June 13, 1972 (age 54) Monterrey, Nuevo Leon, Mexico
- Party: Institutional Revolutionary Party
- Education: Autonomous University of Nuevo León
- Occupation: Politician

Pedro Pablo Treviño Villarreal (born 13 June 1972 in Monterrey, Nuevo León) is a Mexican lawyer and politician.

He served as state secretary of Labor in Nuevo León from 2010 until 2012, federal deputy for the Nuevo León's 12th Federal District from 2012 until 2015, chairman of the Committee on Budget and Public Accounts in the 62nd Legislature of the Mexican Congress, managing director of Lotería Nacional para la Asistencia Pública, Pronósticos para la Asistencia Pública until September 2017, and president of PRI's State Steering Committee in Nuevo León until June 2020.

== Personal life and education ==
Treviño Villarreal was born on 13 June 1972 in Monterrey, Nuevo León, Mexico.

He has a law and social sciences degree from the Autonomous University of Nuevo León. In 2001, he obtained his master's degree in public administration from the University of Colorado, and in 2002 he obtained his master's in international law from the University of Denver. He also has several diplomas in public administration from the Mexico Autonomous Institute of Technology in Mexico City and in business management from Rice University in Houston, Texas. In 2005, he was granted a scholarship by the United States Embassy in Mexico for the North American Competitiveness and Asian Challenge diploma at the Institute of the Americas in California. That same year he received "The Challenges of the future of Mexico: Leadership and Performance Strategies" diploma from Harvard University's John F. Kennedy School of Government in Massachusetts.

== Career ==
=== Private sector ===
In the private sector, Treviño Villarreal has served as adviser to Quintero & Quintero, attorneys at law; assistant financial vice president at Bancomer Transfer Services; transactions lawyer for Mexico and Latin America at Holland & Hart; and international lawyer at Vitro Corporation.

=== Public sector ===
In 1990, Treviño Villarreal joined the Institutional Revolutionary Party (PRI), where he served as leader, coordinator, and political training secretary of municipal committees of the Popular Revolutionary Youth, the youth organization of the National Confederation of Popular Organizations (CNOP).

From 1996 to 1997, he was the secretary to the general director of the National Lottery for the Public Assistance.

In 2003, he served as technical secretary of the Social Development Council of the campaign of winning gubernatorial candidate José Natividad González Parás, and from 2003 to 2006 as deputy minister of trade and industry of Nuevo León.

In 2006, he was nominated by the PRI when he sought election as federal deputy to Nuevo León's 6th federal district.

From 2006 until 2009, he was general director of the Corporation for the Development of Nuevo León's Borderland in the state government.

In 2009 he was institutional relations coordinator of candidate and ex-state governor Rodrigo Medina de la Cruz.

On July 20, 2010, the governor, Rodrigo Medina de la Cruz, appointed him Minister of Labor in the state government, where he served until February 2012.

==== LXII Legislature of the Mexican Congress ====
In the 2012 federal elections Treviño Villarreal was elected federal deputy for the 12th Federal District of Nuevo León, having been nominated by the "Compromiso por Mexico" coalition, which was formed of the PRI and the Ecologist Green Party. On July 6, the Electoral Federal Institute's accredited him as having obtained 126,069 votes (46.01% of the votes cast), which made him the federal deputy candidate with the highest number of votes received nationally.

On August 29, he was sworn as federal deputy of the LXII Legislature of the Mexican Congress. He has served as the chairman of the Committee on Budget and Public Accounts, and as a member of the Northern Border Affairs, Competitiveness, and Special Exportation Manufacturing Industry committees. Additionally, he was vice president of the Group of Friendship Mexico–France and a member of the Group of Friendship Mexico–Japan.

Preceded by Rogelio Cerda Perez	Federal Deputy from Nuevo León's 12th federal district 2012 – present	Succeeded by Incumbent
Preceded by Alvaro Ibarra Hinojosa	Secretary of Labor of Nuevo León; 2010 – 2012	Succeeded by Hector Morales Rivera
