= Underground Electric Railways Company of London =

Former holding company for underground railways and bus operators in London

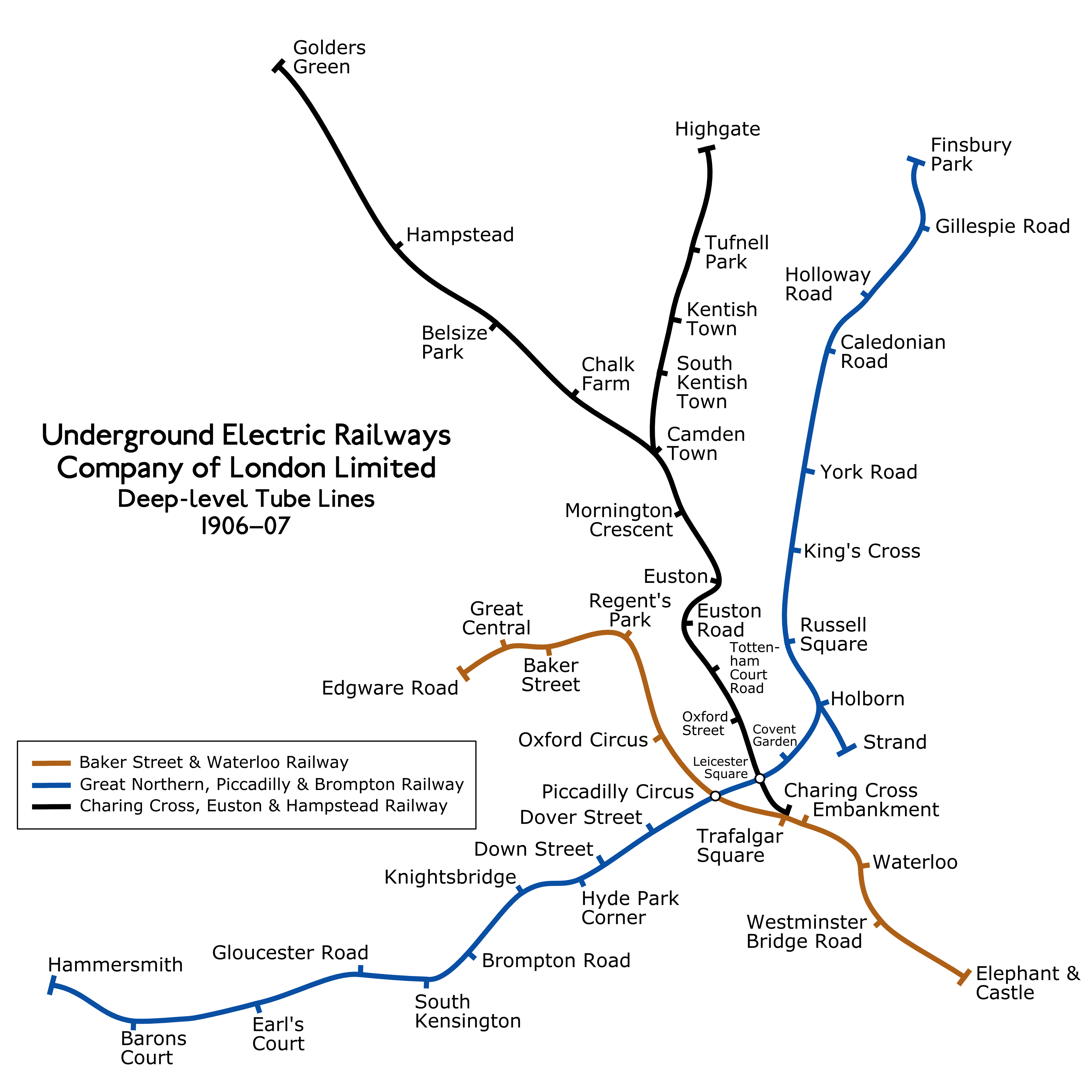
Geographic map of the UERL's three deep-level tube lines in 1907

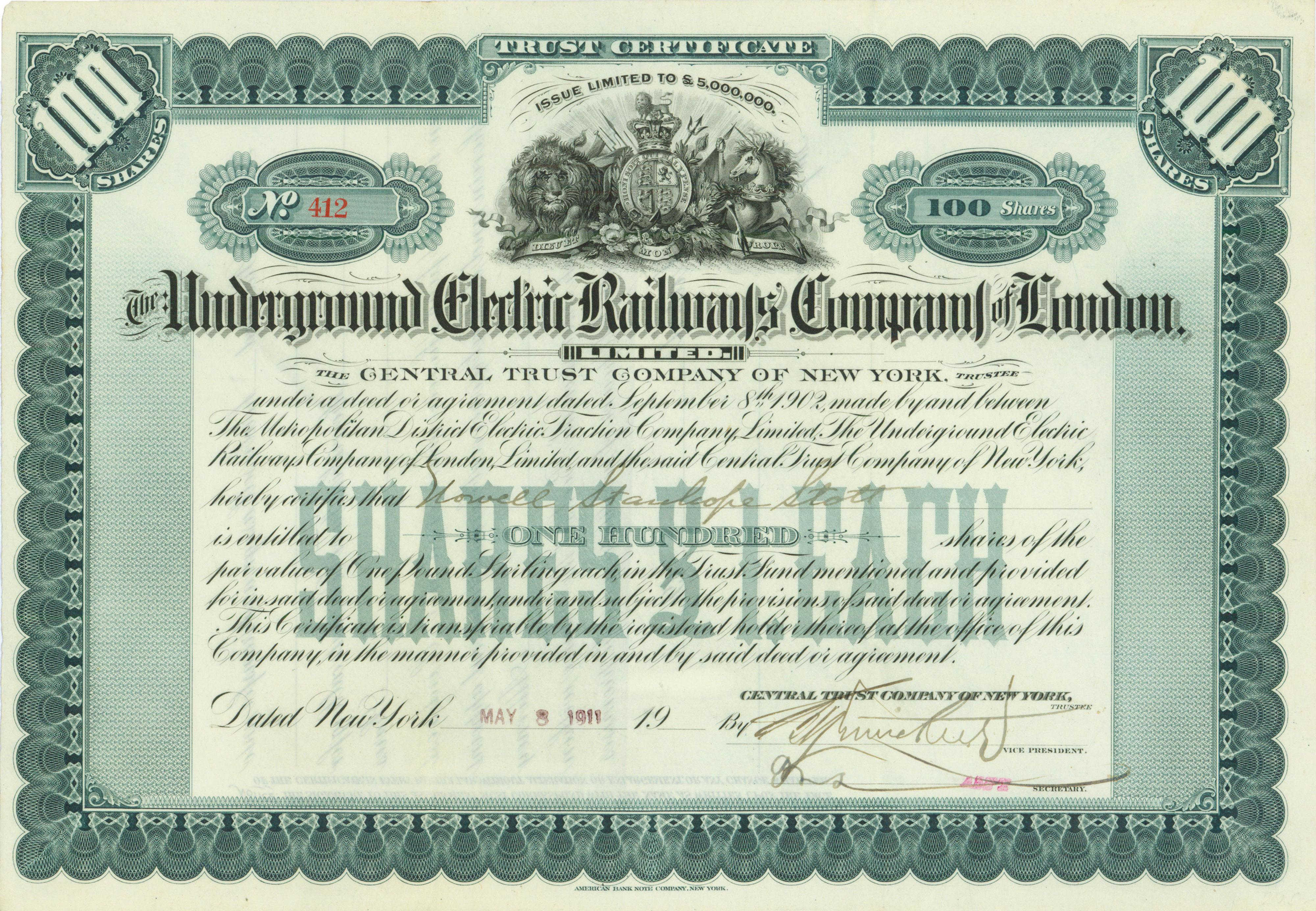
American trust certificate of the Underground Electric Railways Company of London, Ltd., issued 8 May 1911

The Underground Electric Railways Company of London, Limited (UERL), known operationally as the Underground for much of its existence, was established in 1902. It was the holding company for the three deep-level "tube" (Note: A "tube" railway is an underground railway constructed in a circular tunnel by the use of a tunnelling shield, usually deep below ground level. Today, the word is used colloquially to refer to any or all of the London Underground, even those parts that use cut and cover or run above ground.) underground railway lines opened in London during 1906 and 1907: the Baker Street and Waterloo Railway, the Charing Cross, Euston and Hampstead Railway and the Great Northern, Piccadilly and Brompton Railway. It was also the parent company from 1902 of the District Railway, which it electrified between 1903 and 1905. The UERL is a precursor of today's London Underground; its three tube lines form the central sections of today's Bakerloo, Northern and Piccadilly lines.

The UERL struggled financially in the first years after the opening of its lines and narrowly avoided bankruptcy in 1908 by restructuring its debt. A policy of expansion by acquisition was followed before World War I, so the company operated most of the underground railway lines in and around London. It also controlled large bus and tram fleets, the profits from which subsidised the financially weaker railways. After the war, railway extensions took the UERL's services out into suburban areas to stimulate additional passenger numbers so that, by the early 1930s, the company's lines stretched beyond the County of London and served destinations in Middlesex, Essex, Hertfordshire and Surrey.

In the 1920s, competition from small unregulated bus operators reduced the profitability of the road transport operations, leading the UERL's directors to seek government regulation. This led to the establishment of the London Passenger Transport Board in 1933, which absorbed the UERL and all of the independent and municipally operated railway, bus, and tram services in the London area.

== Establishment ==
=== Background ===
The first deep-level tube railway, the City and South London Railway (C&SLR), opened in 1890. Its early success resulted in a rush of proposals to Parliament for other deep-level routes under the capital, but by 1901 only two more lines had opened: the Waterloo & City Railway (W&CR) in 1898 and the Central London Railway (CLR) in 1900. Construction started on one other line and stopped following a financial crisis. The rest of the companies needed help to raise funding.

The District Railway (DR) was a sub-surface (Note: A "sub-surface" underground railway is constructed in a shallow roofed-over trench using the cut and cover method.) underground railway, which had opened in 1868. Its steam-hauled services operated around the Inner Circle and on branches to Hounslow, Wimbledon, Richmond, Ealing, Whitechapel and New Cross. By 1901, the DR was struggling to compete with emerging motor bus and electric tram companies and the CLR, which were eroding its passenger traffic. To become more competitive, the DR was contemplating a programme of electrification. However, it needed to be financially strong enough to raise the capital to carry out the work independently. It also had parliamentary approval for a congestion-relieving deep-level line that was to run beneath its existing route between Gloucester Road and Mansion House.

By 1898, American financier Charles Tyson Yerkes had made a large fortune developing the electric tramway and elevated railway systems in Chicago, but his questionable business methods, which included bribery and blackmail, had finally drawn the disapproving attention of the public. Yerkes had unsuccessfully attempted to bribe the city council and Illinois state legislature into granting him a 100-year franchise for the tramway system. Following a public backlash, he sold his Chicago investments and turned his attention to opportunities in London.

=== Acquisitions ===
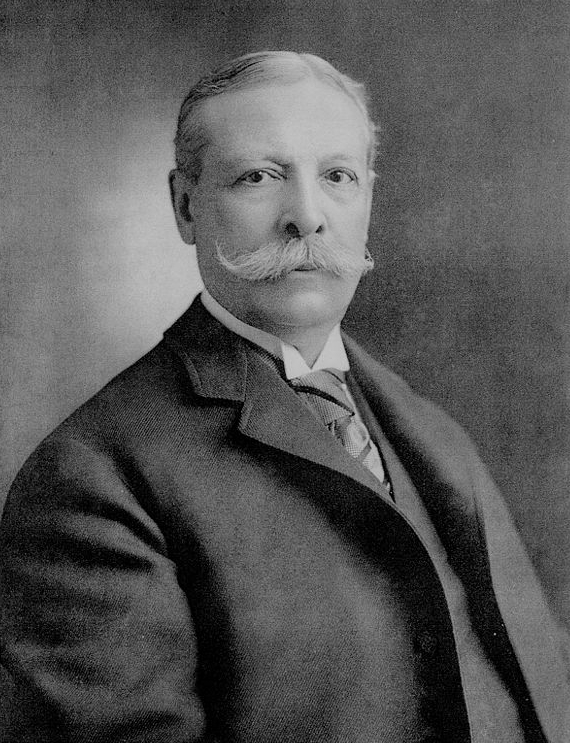
Charles Yerkes, UERL chairman from 1902

Yerkes' first acquisition in London was the Charing Cross, Euston and Hampstead Railway (CCE&HR). The company had parliamentary permission to build a deep-level tube railway from Charing Cross to Hampstead and Highgate. Still, it could not raise the finances, selling only a tiny fraction of the shares. Robert Perks, a solicitor for several railway companies and Member of Parliament for Louth, had suggested the CCE&HR to Yerkes and the American's consortium bought the company for £100,000 (approximately £10.6 million today) on 28 September 1900.

Perks was also a large shareholder in Yerkes' next target, the Metropolitan District Railway, usually known as the District Railway or DR. By March 1901, the syndicate had acquired a controlling interest in the DR and proposed its electrification. Yerkes established the Metropolitan District Electric Traction Company (MDETC) on 15 July 1901 with himself as managing director. The company raised £1 million (£106 million today) to carry out the electrification works including the construction of the generating station and supplying the new electric rolling stock. In September 1901, Perks became the DR's chairman.

The Brompton and Piccadilly Circus Railway (B&PCR) was a tube railway company that had been purchased by the DR in 1898 but had remained a separate financial entity. It had permission to construct a line from South Kensington to Piccadilly Circus. Still, it had yet to raise the capital to do so. At South Kensington, it was to connect to the deep-level line planned by the DR. On 12 September 1901, the DR-controlled board of the B&PCR sold the company to the MDETC. In the same month, the B&PCR took over the Great Northern and Strand Railway (GN&SR), a tube railway with permission to build a line from Strand to Finsbury Park. The routes of the B&PCR and GN&SR were subsequently linked and combined with part of the DR's tube route to create the Great Northern, Piccadilly and Brompton Railway (GNP&BR).

Yerkes' final purchase was the Baker Street and Waterloo Railway (BS&WR) in March 1902 for £360,000 (£38.3 million today). The BS&WR had permission to construct a line from Paddington to Elephant & Castle and, unlike his other tube railway purchases, construction work had started in 1898. Substantial progress had been made before it was stopped following the collapse of the BS&WR's parent company, the London & Globe Finance Corporation, due to the fraud of its managing director Whitaker Wright in 1900. With a varied collection of companies under his control, Yerkes established the UERL in April 1902 to take control of them all and manage the planned works and took the position of chairman. On 8 June 1902, the UERL took over the MDETC and paid off the company's shareholders with cash and UERL shares.

=== Finances ===
The UERL was set up with an initial capitalisation of £5 million (£531 million today). The company was backed by three merchant banks, Speyer Brothers in London, Speyer & Co. in New York and Old Colony Trust Company in Boston, each of which was to receive £250,000 from the capital raised. Almost 60 per cent of the initial share offering was bought in the United States, with a third sold in Britain and the rest mainly in the Netherlands. Further capital was soon needed for the construction works and additional share and bond issues followed. The UERL eventually raised a total of £18 million (£1.89 billion today).

Like many of Yerkes' schemes in the United States, the structure of the UERL's finances was highly complex and involved the use of novel financial instruments. One method, used by Yerkes to raise £7 million, was "profit-sharing secured notes", a form of bond which was secured against the value of shares. They were sold at a 4 per cent discount, paid 5 per cent interest and were due for repayment in 1908. The assumption was that shares would inevitably rise in value once the UERL's tube railways were operational and producing a profit. Investors in the notes would gain the double benefit of the growth in share price and interest.

== Engineering works ==
=== Electrification of the District Railway ===
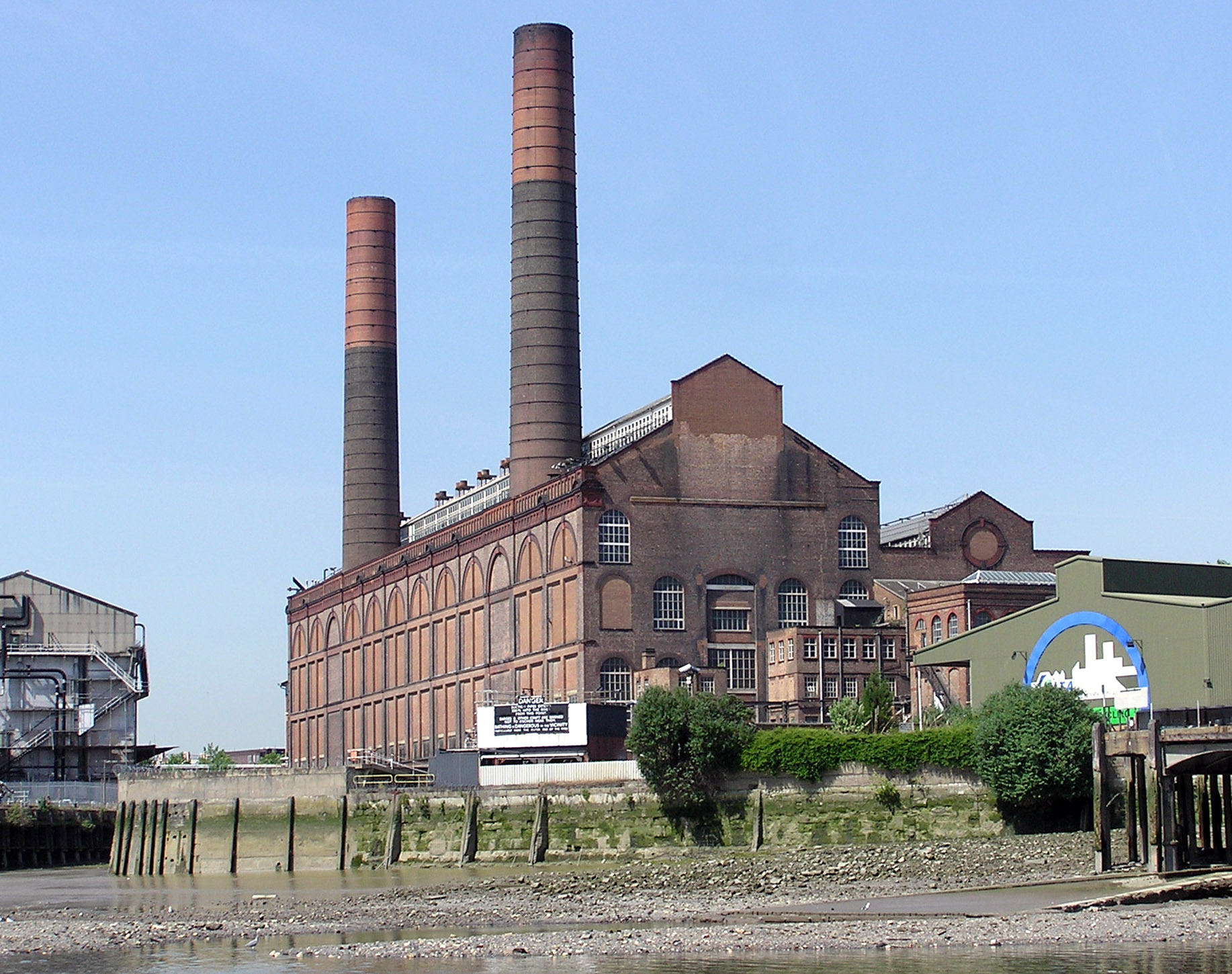
Originally built with four chimneys, Lots Road Power Station provided electricity for all of the UERL's lines.

Before its takeover, the DR had carried out some joint electrification experiments with the Metropolitan Railway (MR), the other sub-surface line with which the DR shared the Inner Circle. A section of track between Earl's Court and High Street Kensington was electrified with a four-rail system and a jointly owned test train operated a shuttle service between February and November 1900. Having proven the practicality of electric traction, the two companies set up a joint committee to select a supplier of equipment for the electrification of their networks.

The committee's preferred system was a 3,000 volt, three-phase alternating current system proposed by Hungarian electrical engineering company Ganz. The system delivered current by overhead conductor wires and was cheaper than alternatives using power rails and required fewer electrical sub-stations. An experimental line had been constructed by Ganz in Budapest, although the system had not yet been adopted for the full-scale operation of a railway. Before the appointment of Ganz could be finalised, Yerkes took control of the DR. He and his engineers preferred the low voltage direct current conductor rail system they had worked with in the United States and which was already in use on the City & South London and Central London Railways; they rejected the Ganz system putting the DR and the MDETC into dispute with the MR which wanted to proceed with the Ganz system. After some acrimonious debate between the two companies, some of which was carried out in public through the letters pages of The Times newspaper, the dispute went to arbitration at the Board of Trade. The decision was made in December 1901 to use the four-rail system, although the arbitrator, Alfred Lyttelton, was critical of the DR's unilateral decision.

Victorious, the MDETC quickly began the electrification of the DR's tracks, starting with an extension from Ealing Common to South Harrow that opened with its first electric service in June 1903. Conversion of the rest of the DR's tracks was completed in mid-1905, although failure to coordinate installations with the MR meant that the first electric services on the Inner Circle from 1 July 1905 were disrupted for several months due to equipment failures on the MR's trains. Power came from the UERL's own Lots Road Power Station on Chelsea Creek. Originally planned by the B&PCR, construction of the power station began in 1902 and finished in December 1904. It became operational on 1 February 1905, generating three-phase alternating current at 11,000 volts, which was converted to 550 volts direct current at track-side transformers located around the network. The power station was constructed large enough to power all of the UERL's lines once they opened plus others later. By the time the last of the DR's steam trains were retired on 5 November 1905, the UERL had spent £1.7 million (£179 million today) on the electrification of the line.

=== Construction of the tube railways ===
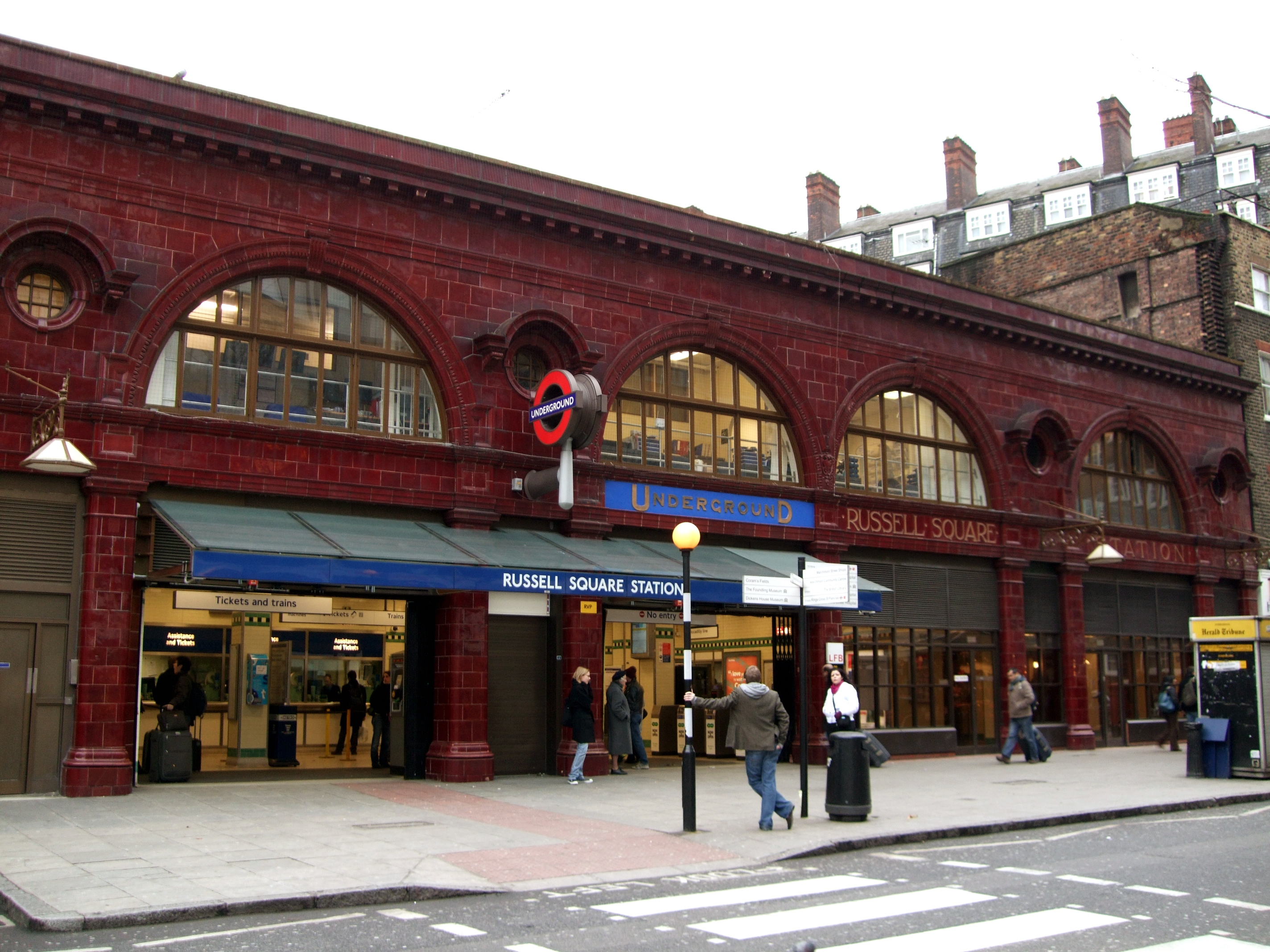
Russell Square station, an example of the Leslie Green design used for the UERL's stations

With funds in place, construction of the BS&WR was quickly restarted. 50 per cent of the tunnelling and 25 per cent of the station work had been completed before work had been stopped, and by February 1904 virtually all of the tunnels and underground parts of the stations between Elephant & Castle and Great Central station (later renamed Marylebone) were complete and works on the station buildings were under way. Construction of the GNP&BR and the CCE&HR began in July 1902 and proceeded quickly so that the UERL was able to record in its annual report in October 1904 that 80 per cent of the GNP&BR's and 75 per cent of the CCE&HR's tunnels had been completed.

Following the pattern adopted by the earlier tube lines, each of the UERL's lines was constructed as a pair of circular tunnels using tunnelling shields with segmental cast iron tunnel linings bolted together and grouted into place as the shield advanced. Generally the tunnels followed surface roads and were constructed side by side, but where the width of the road above was insufficient, tunnels were placed one above the other. Stations on all three lines were provided with surface buildings designed by the UERL's architect Leslie Green in a standardised style modified for each site. These consisted of two-storey steel-framed buildings faced with red glazed terracotta blocks with wide semi-circular windows on the upper floor. (Note: Stations which did not have surface buildings by Leslie Green were Regent's Park, Trafalgar Square, Embankment and Waterloo on the BS&WR, Finsbury Park, Earl's Court, Barons Court and Hammersmith on the GNP&BR and Tottenham Court Road and Charing Cross on the CCE&HR. For these stations the tube line was accessed either from an existing station building or from a pedestrian subway under the street.) The stations had flat roofs and were designed to accommodate upward extension for commercial development. Most stations were provided with between two and four lifts and an emergency spiral staircase in a separate shaft. (Note: The lifts, supplied by American manufacturer Otis, were installed in pairs within 23-foot (7.0 m) diameter shafts. The number of lifts depended on the expected passenger demand at the stations, for example, the BS&WR's Lambeth North had two lifts, but Elephant & Castle originally had four.) At platform level, the wall tiling featured the station name and an individual geometric pattern and colour scheme designed by Green.

The UERL used a Westinghouse automatic signalling system operated through electrified track circuits. This controlled signals based on the presence or absence of a train on the track ahead. Signals incorporated an arm that was raised when the signal was red. If a train failed to stop at a red signal, the arm would activate a "tripcock" on the train; applying the brakes automatically.

== Operation ==
=== Early struggle for survival ===
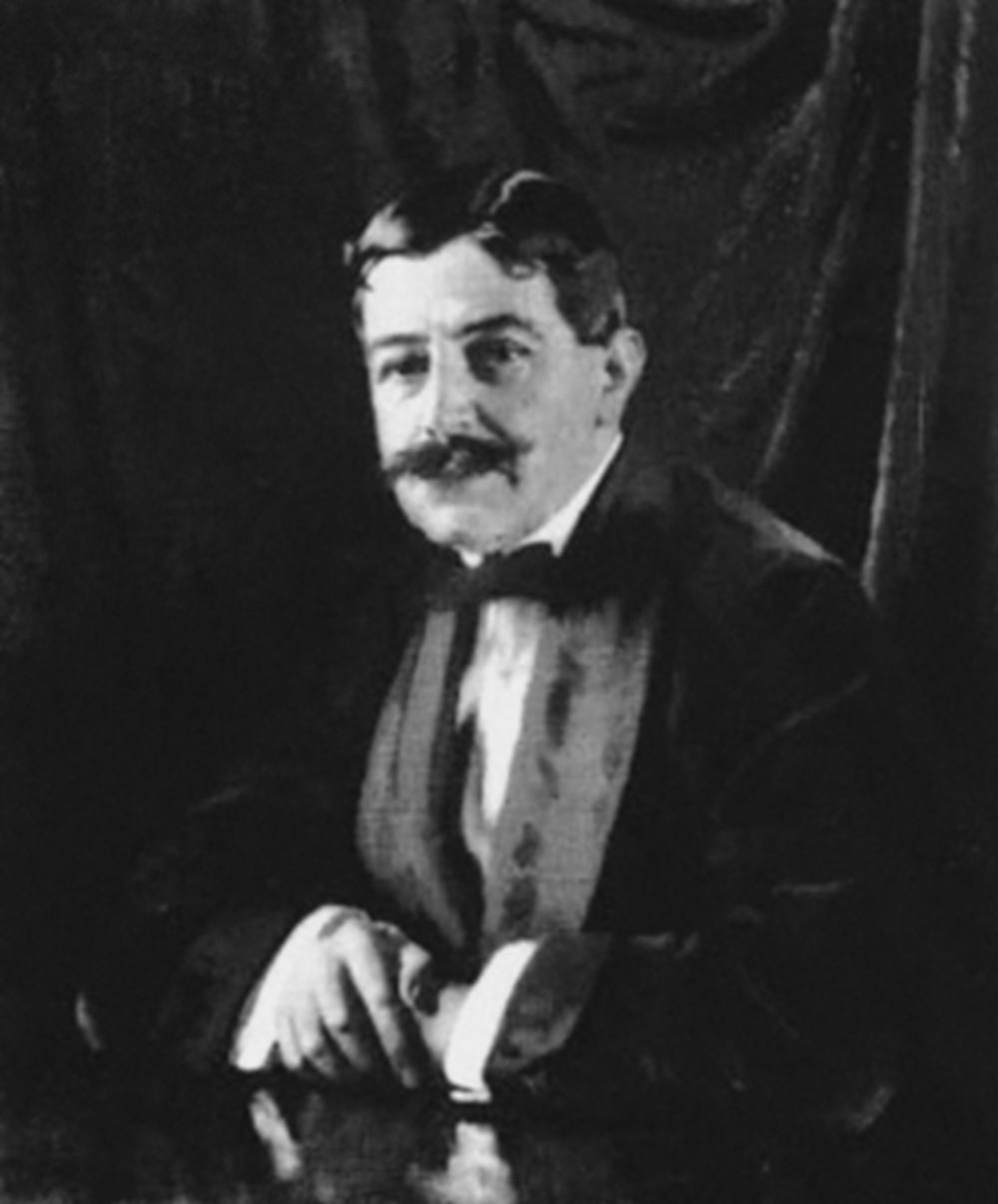
Sir Edgar Speyer, chairman of Speyer Brothers and UERL chairman from 1906

Apart from the electrification of the DR, Yerkes did not live to see the completion of the fast-paced construction works that he set in motion; he died in New York on 29 December 1905 and was replaced as UERL chairman by Edgar Speyer. Speyer was chairman of the UERL's backer Speyer Brothers and a partner in Speyer & Co. Sir George Gibb, general manager of the North Eastern Railway, was appointed managing director. The BS&WR opened to passengers on 10 March 1906. The GNP&BR followed on 15 December 1906, with the CCE&HR on 22 June 1907. The three tube lines quickly came to be known as the Bakerloo Tube, Piccadilly Tube and Hampstead Tube.

Yerkes also did not live to see the UERL's financial struggle during the first years after the opening of the new lines. Because of greatly over-optimistic pre-opening predictions of passenger numbers, the lines failed to generate the income expected and needed to fund the interest payments on the UERL's substantial borrowings. In the Bakerloo Tube's first twelve months of operation, it carried 20.5 million passengers, less than sixty per cent of the 35 million that had been predicted during the planning of the line. The Piccadilly Tube achieved 26 million of a predicted 60 million and the Hampstead Tube managed 25 million of a predicted 50 million. For the DR, the UERL had predicted an increase to 100 million passengers after electrification, but achieved 55 million. The lower than expected passenger numbers were partly due to competition between the UERL's lines and those of the other tube and sub-surface railway companies, and the further spread of electric trams and motor buses, replacing slower, horse-drawn road transport, that took a large number of passengers away from the trains. The low price of tickets also depressed income.

The crisis point for the UERL was the need to redeem the five-year profit-sharing secured notes on 30 June 1908. The UERL did not have the money. Speyer unsuccessfully tried to persuade the London County Council (LCC) to inject £5 million into the UERL and used some of his own bank's money to pay-off disgruntled shareholders threatening bankruptcy proceedings. Eventually, Speyer and Gibb managed to obtain agreement from the shareholders to convert the notes into long-term debt to be repaid in 1933 and 1948.

=== Consolidation ===
Albert Stanley (Lord Ashfield from 1920), managing director of the UERL from 1910 and chairman from 1919

As Speyer and Gibb worked to restructure the debt, the UERL's general manager, Albert Stanley, appointed by Gibb in 1907, began to increase the UERL's income by improving management structures. With commercial manager Frank Pick, Stanley instigated a plan to increase passenger numbers; developing the "Underground" brand and establishing a joint booking system and coordinated fares throughout all of London's underground railways, including those not controlled by the UERL.

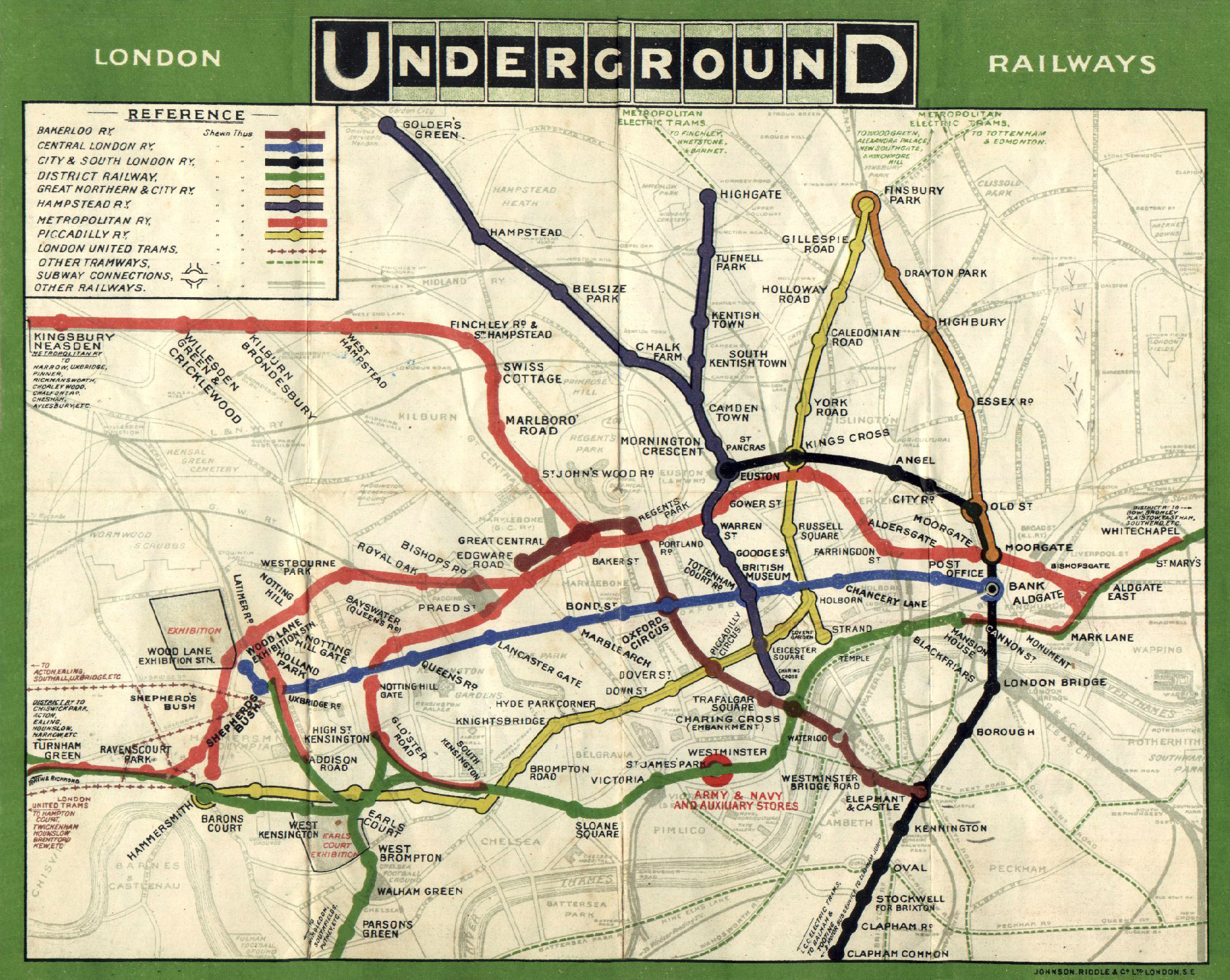
The first Underground map from 1908 showing the UERL's lines and those of the other tube companies and the Metropolitan Railway

In 1909, the UERL overcame the objections of previously reluctant American investors, and announced a parliamentary bill for the formal merger of the Bakerloo, Hampstead and Piccadilly Tube lines into a single company, the London Electric Railway Company (LER). This bill received royal assent and was enacted on 26 July 1910 as the London Electric Railway Amalgamation Act 1910 (10 Edw. 7. & 1 Geo. 5. c. xxxii). The DR was not merged with the tube lines and remained a separate company.

As managing director of the UERL from 1910, Stanley led further transport consolidation with the UERL's take-over of London General Omnibus Company (LGOC) in 1912 and the CLR and the C&SLR on 1 January 1913. The LGOC was the dominant bus operator in the capital and its high profitability (it paid dividends of 18 per cent compared with Underground Group companies' dividends of 1 to 3 per cent) subsidised the rest of the group. Through the UERL's shareholding in the London and Suburban Traction Company (LSTC), which it owned jointly with British Electric Traction, the UERL took control in 1913 of the London United Tramways, the Metropolitan Electric Tramways and the South Metropolitan Electric Tramways. The UERL also took control of bus builder AEC. The much enlarged group became known as the Combine. Only the MR (and its subsidiaries the Great Northern & City Railway and the East London Railway) and the W&CR (by then fully owned by the London and South Western Railway) remained outside of the Underground Group's control.

=== Extensions and improvements ===
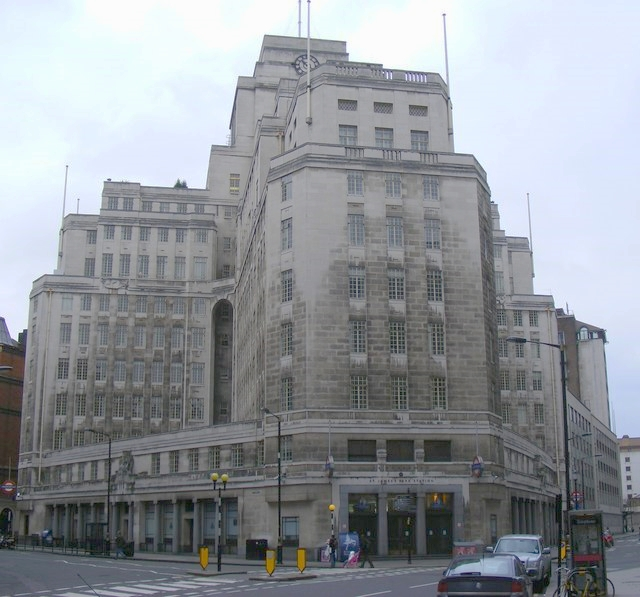
55 Broadway, St James's, headquarters of the London Electric Railway

Another way in which the UERL tried to improve income was the construction of extensions to its lines to generate additional passenger traffic, often through the stimulation of new housing developments in the areas through which the lines ran. The DR was extended to Uxbridge in 1910, by a connection made to the MR. In 1913, the Bakerloo Tube was extended to Paddington and to Queen's Park and Watford Junction four years later. The Hampstead tube was extended a short distance at its southern end to provide an interchange with the Bakerloo and the DR at Embankment in 1914. It was extended at its northern end from Golders Green into the Middlesex countryside to reach Edgware in 1924. In 1926, the Hampstead tube was extended south to connect to the C&SLR at Kennington in conjunction with a reconstruction of the C&SLR and its 1926 extension from Clapham Common to Morden. The CLR was extended to Ealing Broadway in 1920. Permission for an extension of the line to Richmond was obtained in 1913 and again in 1920, but was not used. Later, during 1932 and 1933, the Piccadilly Tube was extended at both ends: in the north from Finsbury Park to Cockfosters, and in the west from Hammersmith to Hounslow and Uxbridge using the DR's tracks.

In addition, a programme of modernising many of the Underground's busiest central London stations was started; providing them with escalators to replace lifts. New and refurbished rolling stock was gradually introduced on a number of lines with automatic sliding doors along the length of the carriages instead of manual end gates, reducing boarding times. By the middle of the 1920s, the organisation had expanded to such an extent that a large, new headquarters building designed by Charles Holden was constructed at 55 Broadway over St James's Park station.

== Move to public ownership ==
Starting in the early 1920s, competition from numerous small bus companies, nicknamed "pirates" because they operated irregular routes and plundered the LGOC's passengers, eroded the profitability of the Combine's bus operations. This had a negative impact on the profitability of the whole group. Stanley lobbied the government for regulation of transport services in the London area. Starting in 1923, a series of legislative initiatives were made in this direction, with Stanley and Labour politician Herbert Morrison, London County Councillor (and later member of parliament and Minister of Transport) at the forefront of debates as to the level of regulation and public control under which transport services should be brought. Stanley aimed for regulation that would give the UERL group protection from competition and allow it to take substantive control of the LCC's tram system; Morrison preferred full public ownership. After seven years of false starts, a bill was announced at the end of 1930 for the formation of the London Passenger Transport Board (LPTB), a public corporation that would take control of the UERL, the Metropolitan Railway and all bus and tram operators within an area designated as the London Passenger Transport Area. As Stanley had done with shareholders in 1910 over the consolidation of the three UERL controlled tube lines, he used his persuasiveness to obtain their agreements to the government buy-out of their stock.

The Board was a compromise – public ownership but not full nationalisation – and came into existence on 1 July 1933, with Stanley as chairman and Pick as Chief Executive.

== See also ==
- List of transport undertakings transferred to the London Passenger Transport Board
- London Post Office Railway
- History of public transport authorities in London

== Notes and references ==
=== Bibliography ===
- Badsey-Ellis, Antony (2005). London's Lost Tube Schemes. Capital Transport. ISBN 1-85414-293-3.
- Bruce, J Graeme; Croome, Desmond F (2006) [1996]. The Central Line. Capital Transport. ISBN 1-85414-297-6.
- Connor, J.E. (2006) [2001]. London's Disused Underground Stations. Capital Transport. ISBN 1-85414-250-X.
- Day, John R; Reed, John (2008) [1963]. The Story of London's Underground. Capital Transport. ISBN 978-1-85414-316-7.
- Horne, Mike (2001). The Bakerloo Line. Capital Transport. ISBN 1-85414-248-8.
- Horne, Mike (2006). The District Line. Capital Transport. ISBN 1-85414-292-5.
- Rose, Douglas (1999) [1980]. The London Underground, A Diagrammatic History. Douglas Rose/Capital Transport. ISBN 1-85414-219-4.
- Wolmar, Christian (2005) [2004]. The Subterranean Railway: How the London Underground Was Built and How It Changed the City Forever. Atlantic Books. ISBN 1-84354-023-1.
