= Raúl Gracia Guzmán =

Mexican politician

Senator for Nuevo León
- In office 1 September 2012 – 31 August 2018
- Preceded by: Eloy Cantú Segovia
- Succeeded by: Víctor Oswaldo Fuentes Solís

Member of the Chamber of Deputies for Nuevo León's 7th district
- In office 1 September 2000 – 31 August 2003
- Preceded by: Juan Carlos Ruíz García
- Succeeded by: Alfonso González Ruiz

Personal details
- Born: 20 February 1975 (age 51) Monterrey, Nuevo León, Mexico
- Party: PAN
- Occupation: Senator

Raúl Gracia Guzmán (born 20 February 1975) is a Mexican politician affiliated with the National Action Party (PAN). He was a deputy during the 64th Congress (2018–2021). He served as a senator in the 62nd and 62rd Congresses (2012–2018), representing Nuevo León. He also served as a deputy, for Nuevo León's 7th district, during the 58th Congress (2000–2003).
