= Trust certificate =

Trust certificate may refer to:

- Public key infrastructure
- Trust Certificate (finance)
