= Eloy Cantú Segovia =

Mexican politician

President of the Senate of Mexico
- In office 1 September 1995 – 30 September 1995
- Preceded by: Martha Lara Alatorre
- Succeeded by: Eugenio Ruiz Orozco

Senator for Nuevo León
- In office 1 September 2006 – 31 August 2012
- Preceded by: Rubén Zarazúa Rocha
- Succeeded by: Raúl Gracia Guzmán
- In office 1 November 1994 – 31 August 2000
- Succeeded by: Adalberto Madero

Member of the Chamber of Deputies for Nuevo León's 5th district
- In office 1 September 2000 – 31 August 2003
- Preceded by: Juan Manuel Parás González
- Succeeded by: Marcela Guerra Castillo

Member of the Chamber of Deputies for Nuevo León's 7th district
- In office 1 November 1991 – 31 October 1994
- Preceded by: Ismael Garza T. González
- Succeeded by: Dante Decanini Livas

Personal details
- Born: 24 September 1952 (age 73) Monterrey, Nuevo León, Mexico
- Party: PRI
- Occupation: Politician

Eloy Cantú Segovia (Note: In this Spanish name, the first or paternal surname is Cantú and the second or maternal family name is Segovia.) (born 24 September 1952) is a Mexican politician affiliated with the Institutional Revolutionary Party (PRI).

Cantú Segovia was born in Monterrey, Nuevo León, in 1952 and has been an active member of the PRI in 1971. He holds degrees in law (Universidad de Monterrey, 1975) and economics (Instituto Tecnológico y de Estudios Superiores de Monterrey, 1975), and a doctorate in constitutional law from the University of Paris II.

He has been elected to the Chamber of Deputies three times: in the 1991 mid-terms, for Nuevo León's 7th district; in the 2000 general election, for Nuevo León's 5th district; and in the 2012 general election, as a plurinominal deputy.

He has also been elected to two six-year terms in the Senate, representing Nuevo León: 1994–2000 (56th and 57th sessions of Congress) and 2006–2012 (60th and 61st sessions).
