= Víctor Oswaldo Fuentes Solís =

Mexican politician

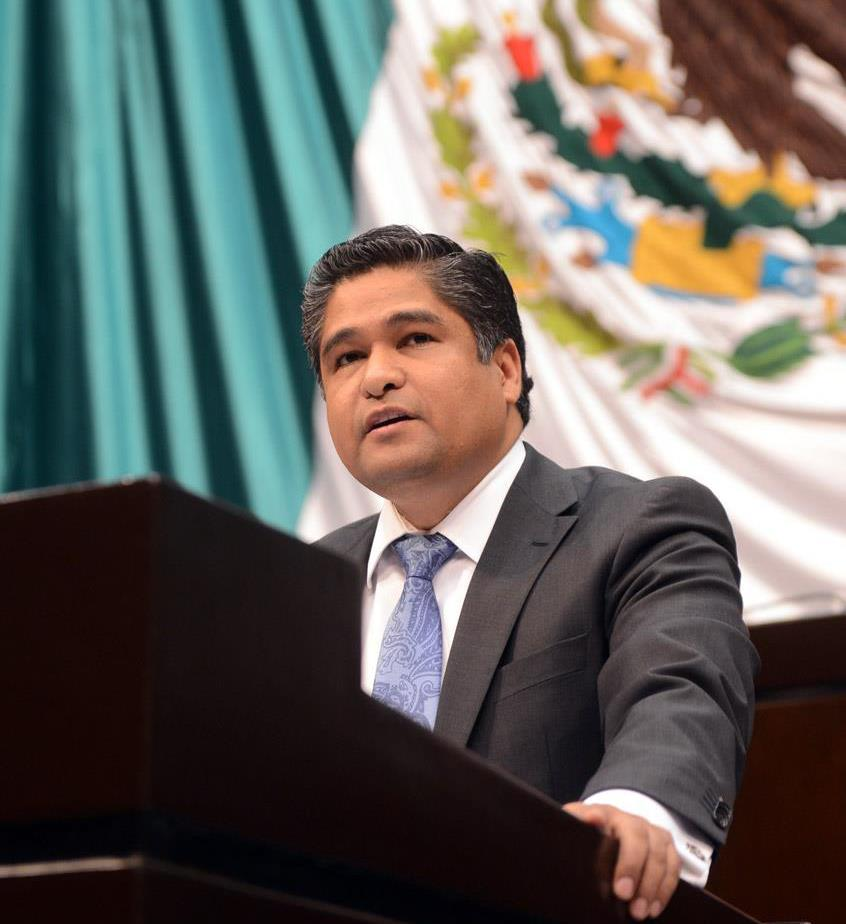
- Víctor Solís in 2014

Senator of the Republic from Nuevo León First minority
- In office 14 May 2021 – 31 August 2024
- Preceded by: Jesús Horacio González
- Succeeded by: Luis Donaldo Colosio Riojas
- In office 1 September 2018 – 28 January 2021
- Preceded by: Raúl Gracia Guzmán
- Succeeded by: Jesús Horacio González

Personal details
- Born: 27 May 1975 (age 50) Monterrey, Nuevo León, Mexico
- Party: National Action Party (1994–2021; since 2021)
- Other political affiliations: Morena (2021)
- Education: Universidad Regiomontana
- Occupation: Senator

Víctor Oswaldo Fuentes Solís (born 27 May 1975) is a Mexican politician affiliated with the National Action Party (PAN).

Fuentes Solís served in the Congress of Nuevo León from 2009 to 2012. In the 2012 general election he was elected to the Chamber of Deputies to represent Nuevo León's 4th district during the 62nd session of Congress. He resigned his seat on 12 February 2015 and was replaced for the remainder of his term by his alternate, Ricardo Flores Suárez.

In the 2018 general election he was elected to the Senate for Nuevo León.
