= José Martín López Cisneros =

Mexican politician

- Born: 11 November 1972 (age 53); Monterrey, Nuevo León, Mexico
- Occupation: Politician
- Political party: PAN
- Website: http://www.martinlopez.mx/

José Martín López Cisneros (born 11 November 1972) is a Mexican politician affiliated with the National Action Party (PAN). In the 2012 general election he was elected to the Chamber of Deputies to represent Nuevo León's 7th district during the 62nd Congress. In the 2018 general election he was elected to the Chamber of Deputies to represent Nuevo León's 10th district during the 64th Congress.

He also served as a deputy during the 60th Congress (2006–2009).
