= Cristian Castaño Contreras =

Mexican politician

- Born: 12 September 1970 (age 55); Monterrey, Nuevo León, Mexico
- Occupation: Politician
- Political party: PAN

Cristian Castaño Contreras (born 12 September 1970) is a Mexican politician affiliated with the National Action Party (PAN). He has served as a federal deputy of the 56th and 60th sessions of Congress representing Nuevo León, and previously served as a local deputy in the 68th session of the Congress of Nuevo León.

Among his elected positions are those of councilman, federal deputy to the 56th Congress from 1994 to 1997, deputy to the Congress of Nuevo León from 1997 to 2000 and federal deputy for the 7th federal electoral district of Nuevo León in the 60th Congress (2006–2009), where he served as vice-coordinator of the PAN bench.

From 2001 to 2006 he was general director of the Mexican Youth Institute. He is currently director of the School of Criminology and Law at the Universidad Metropolitana de Monterrey.
