= 12th federal electoral district of Nuevo León =

Federal electoral district of Mexico

Nuevo León's 12th
- Electoral district of the Chamber of Deputies of Mexico

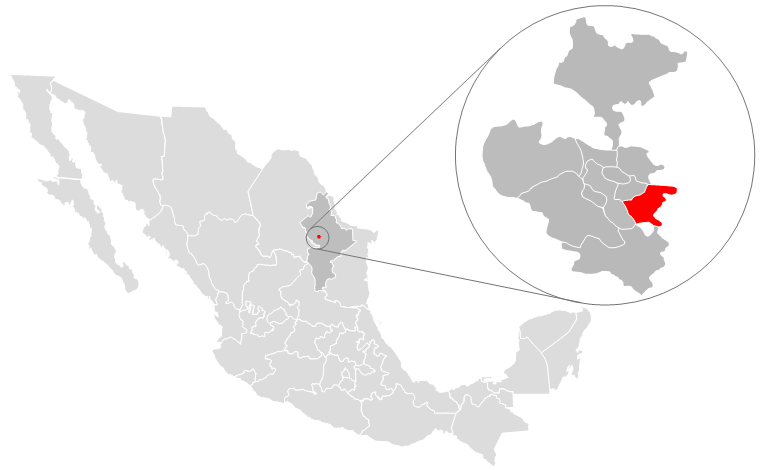
- 12th district since 2022

Incumbent
- Member: Héctor de la Garza Villarreal
- Party: ▌Ecologist Green Party
- Congress: 66th (2024–2027)

District
- State: Nuevo León
- Head town: Ciudad Benito Juárez
- Coordinates: 25°39′N 100°05′W
- Covers: Municipality of Júarez
- PR region: Second
- Precincts: 172
- Population: 470,587 (2020 census)

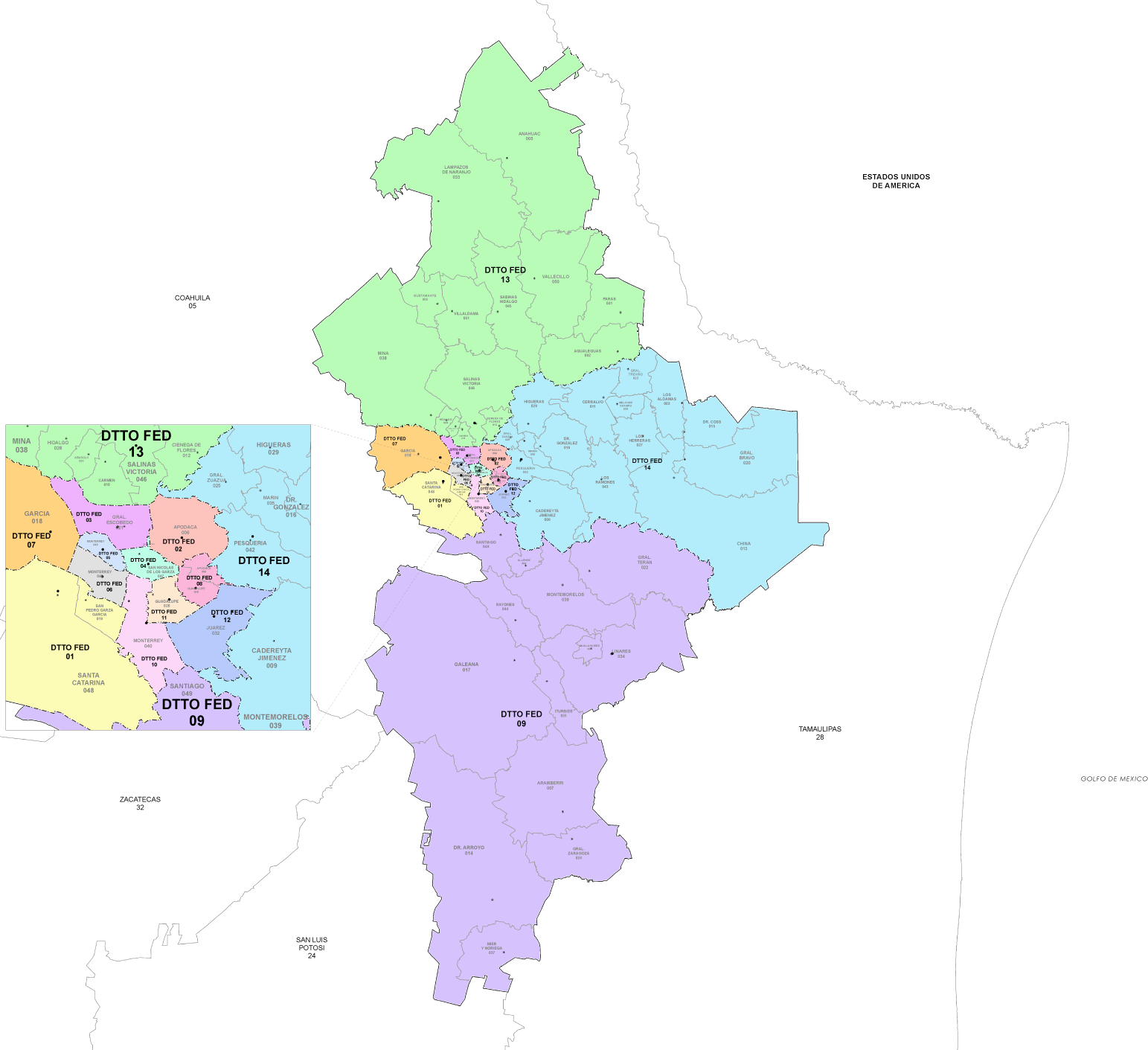
Federal electoral districts of Nuevo León since 2023

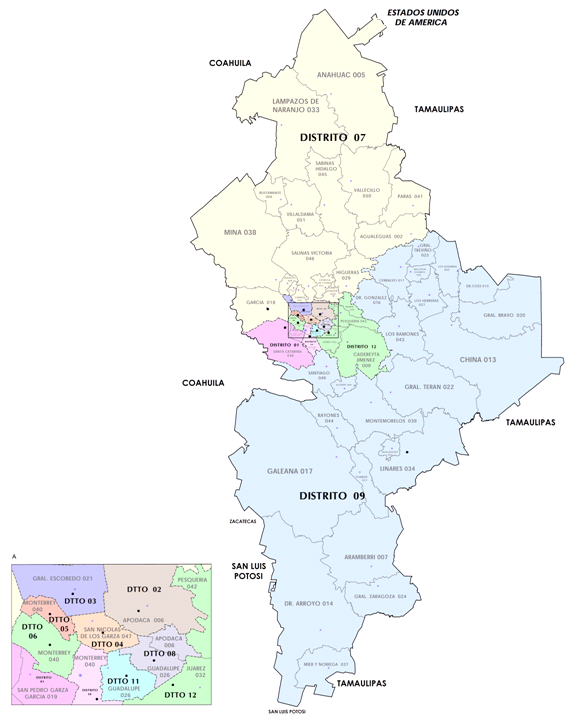
Nuevo León's districts in 2017–2022

The 12th federal electoral district of Nuevo León (Spanish: Distrito electoral federal 12 de Nuevo León) is one of the 300 electoral districts into which Mexico is divided for elections to the federal Chamber of Deputies and one of 14 such districts in the state of Nuevo León.

It elects one deputy to the lower house of Congress for each three-year legislative session by means of the first-past-the-post system. Votes cast in the district also count towards the calculation of proportional representation ("plurinominal") deputies elected from the second region.

The 12th district was created by the Federal Electoral Institute (IFE) its 2005 redistricting process and was first contested in the 2006 general election. The current member for the district, elected in the 2024 general election, is Héctor Alfonso de la Garza Villarreal of the Ecologist Green Party of Mexico (PVEM).

== District territory ==
In its 2023 districting plan, which is to be used for the 2024, 2027 and 2030 federal elections, the National Electoral Institute (INE) increased Nuevo León's congressional seat allocation from 12 to 14. The reconfigured 12th district is in the Monterrey metropolitan area and covers the 172 electoral precincts (secciones electorales) that make up the municipality of Júarez.

The head town (cabecera distrital), where results from individual polling stations are gathered together and tallied, is the city of Ciudad Benito Juárez. The district reported a population of 470,587 in the 2020 census.

== Previous districting schemes ==
Evolution of electoral district numbers
	1974	1978	1996	2005	2017	2023
Nuevo León	7	11	11	12	12	14
Chamber of Deputies	196	300				

2017–2022

Between 2017 and 2022, the district comprised 200 precincts and covered the municipalities of Cadereyta Jiménez, Juárez, Marín and Pesquería.

2005–2017

Under the 2005 districting plan, the newly created district's head town was at Cadereyta Jiménez and it covered 255 precincts across 28 municipalities in the north of the state.

== Deputies returned to Congress ==
(Mexico) National parties
- Current
- PAN
- PRI
- PT
- PVEM
- MC
- Morena
- PAZ
- Somos
- Defunct or local only
- PLM
- PNR
- PRM
- PNM
- PP
- PPS
- PARM
- PFCRN
- CON
- PANAL
- PSD
- PES
- PES
- PRD

Nuevo León's 12th district
Election	Deputy	Party	Term	Legislature
2006	Juan Manuel Parás González	Institutional Revolutionary Party	2006–2009	60th Congress
2009	Rogelio Cerda Pérez	Institutional Revolutionary Party	2009–2012	61st Congress
2012	Pedro Pablo Treviño Villarreal	Institutional Revolutionary Party	2012–2015	62nd Congress
2015	Edgar Romo García	Institutional Revolutionary Party	2015–2018	63rd Congress
2018	Sandra Paola González Castañeda	National Regeneration Movement	2018–2021	64th Congress
2021	José Luis Garza Ochoa	Institutional Revolutionary Party	2021–2024	65th Congress
2024	Héctor Alfonso de la Garza Villarreal	Ecologist Green Party of Mexico	2024–2027	66th Congress

== Presidential elections ==
Nuevo León's 12th district
Election	District won by	Party or coalition	%
2018	Andrés Manuel López Obrador	Juntos Haremos Historia	44.8270
2024	Claudia Sheinbaum Pardo	Sigamos Haciendo Historia	55.5090
