= List of transport undertakings transferred to the London Passenger Transport Board =

The following is a list of the transport undertakings transferred to the London Passenger Transport Board under the terms of the London Passenger Transport Act 1933. The transfer took a number of months as agreement had to be reached between the various operators and the board.

== 1 July 1933 ==
- Undertakings owned by the Underground Group:
  - The London Electric Railway Company
  - The Metropolitan District Railway Company
  - The Central London Railway Company
  - The City & South London Railway Company
  - The Lots Road Power House Joint Committee
  - The London General Omnibus Company, Limited
  - London General Country Services, Limited
  - Overground, Limited
  - The Tramways (M.E.T.) Omnibus Company, Limited
  - The Metropolitan Electric Tramways, Limited
  - The London United Tramways, Limited
  - The Union Surplus Lands Company, Limited
  - The Union Construction and Finance Company, Limited
  - Morden Station Garage, Limited
  - Acme Pullman Services, Limited
  - Bucks Expresses (Watford), Limited
  - Green Line Coaches, Limited.
  - Skylark Motor Coach Company, Limited
  - South Metropolitan Electric Tramways and Lighting Company, Limited (tramway and light railway undertaking only)
- The Metropolitan Railway Company, (excluding the undertaking of the Surplus Lands Committee)
- The following local authorities' tramway, light railway or trolley vehicle undertakings:
  - The mayor, aldermen and burgesses of the borough of Barking
  - The Bexley Urban District Council
  - The mayor, aldermen and burgesses of the County Borough of Croydon
  - The mayor and commonalty and citizens of the City of London
  - The Dartford Urban District Council
  - The mayor, aldermen and burgesses of the County Borough of East Ham
  - The Erith Urban District Council
  - The Hertfordshire County Council
  - The mayor, aldermen and burgesses of the borough of Ilford
  - The mayor, aldermen and burgesses of the borough of Leyton
  - The London County Council
  - The Middlesex County Council
  - The mayor, aldermen and burgesses of the borough of Walthamstow
  - The mayor, aldermen and burgesses of the County Borough of West Ham
- Thomas Tilling, Limited
- Tilling and British Automobile Traction Company Limited

== 1 October 1933 ==
- Thomas Tilling Limited
- Lewis Omnibus Company Limited

== 31 October 1933 ==
- Cardinal Omnibus Company, Limited
- Chariot Omnibus Services, Limited
- Filkins & Ainsworth, Limited.
- Glen Omnibus Company (London), Limited
- F. W. Hayes
- F. J. C. Kirk.
- Nelson Omnibus Company, Limited
- A. H. Raper
- Ryan Omnibus Company
- F. Steer
- Supreme Motor Omnibus Company, Limited
- United Omnibus Company, Limited

== 9 November 1933 ==
- Convey and Clayton
- Eagle Omnibus Company, Limited
- Essex Omnibus Company, Limited
- E. G. Hope
- A. Mills
- C. H. Pickup
- Pro Bono Publico, Limited
- Renown Traction Company, Limited
- Charles Russett and Son

== 23 November 1933 ==
- Amersham and District Motor Bus and Haulage Company, Limited
- Earl Motor Omnibus Company, Limited
- E. Puttergill, Limited
- F. A. Rasey
- A. G. Summerskill, Limited
- Triumph Motor Omnibus Company
- Woolvett and Carswell

== 4 December 1933 ==
- G. H. Allitt and Sons, Limited
- E. Brickwood, Limited
- Cleveland Omnibus Company, Limited
- Enterprise Transport Company, Limited
- Holliday and Bangs
- Peraeque Transport Company, Limited
- Pioneer Omnibus Company

== 14 December 1933 ==
- B.B.P. Omnibus Company, Limited
- Gordon Omnibus Company, Limited
- Powell and Whybrow

== 20 December 1933 ==
- Premier Omnibus Company, Limited
- Premier Line, Limited

== 1 February 1934 ==
- Empress Motors, Limited

== 14 February 1934 ==
- Red Rover Omnibus, Limited

== 21 February 1934 ==
- Birch Brothers, Limited

== 13 June 1934 ==
- Paterson Omnibus Company, Limited

== 11 July 1934 ==
- Westminster Omnibus Company, Limited

== 18 July 1934 ==
- St. George Omnibus Company, Limited

== 10 August 1934 ==
- Chocolate Express Omnibus Company, Limited

== 29 August 1934 ==
- Ambassador Bus Company, Limited
- Sphere Omnibus Company, Limited
- Miller Traction Company, Limited
- Perkins Omnibus Company, Limited

== 7 November 1934 ==
- City Motor Omnibus Company, Limited
- Reliance Omnibus Company, Limited
- Victory Omnibus Company, Limited

== 5 December 1934 ==
- Prince Omnibus Company, Limited
