= 7th federal electoral district of Nuevo León =

Federal electoral district of Mexico

Nuevo León's 7th
- Electoral district of the Chamber of Deputies of Mexico

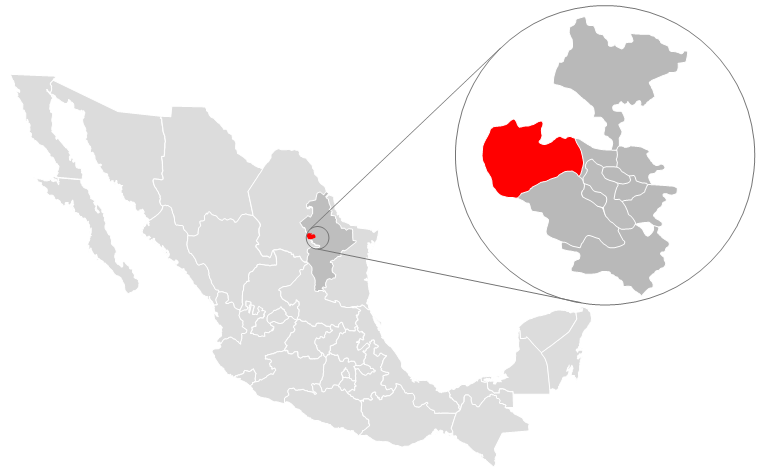

Incumbent
- Member: Carlos Alberto Guevara Garza
- Party: ▌Ecologist Green Party of Mexico
- Congress: 66th (2024–2027)

District
- State: Nuevo León
- Head town: Valle de Lincoln, García
- Coordinates: 25°49′N 100°35′W
- Covers: García
- PR region: Second
- Precincts: 136
- Population: 397,071 (2020 census)

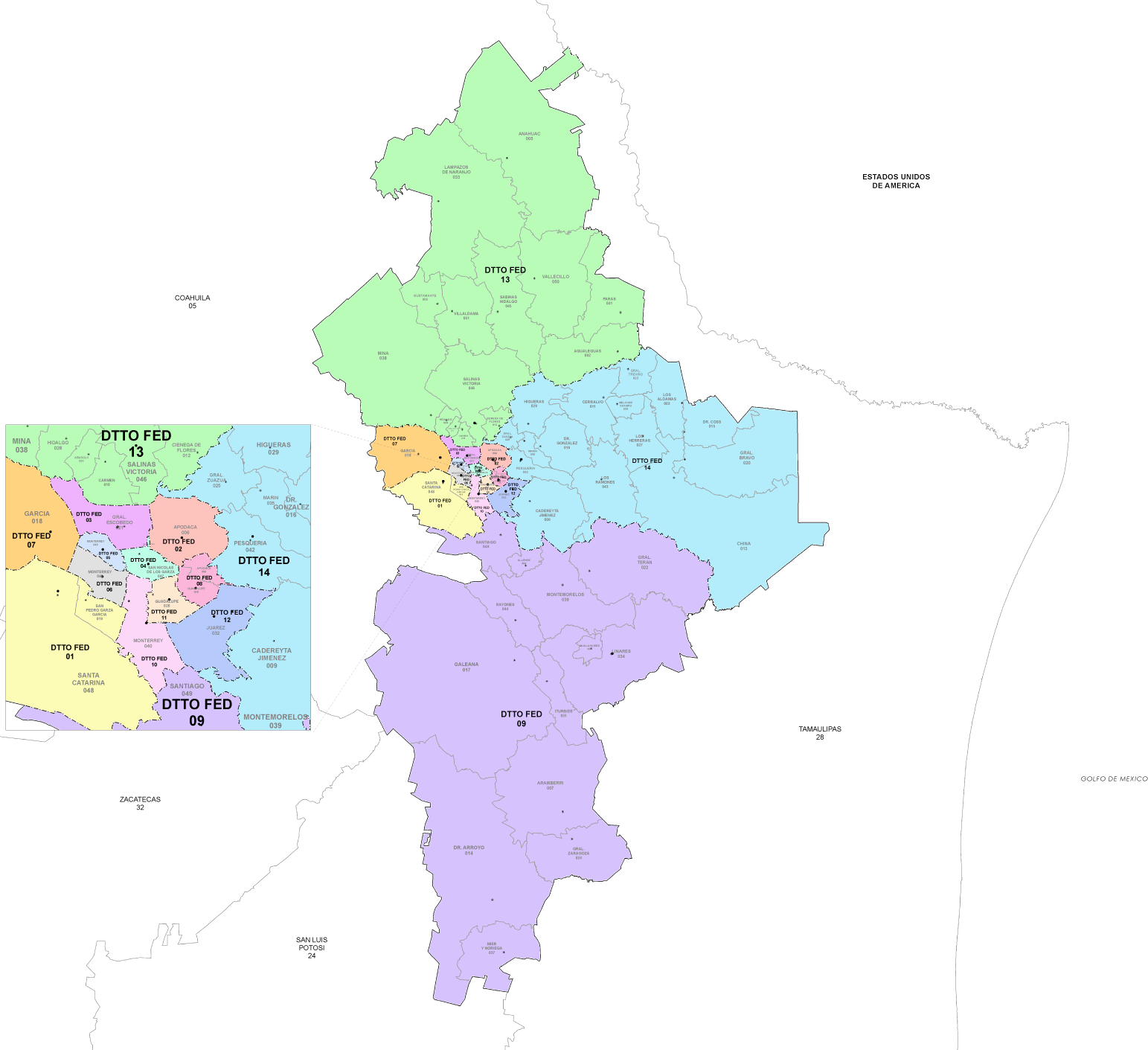
Nuevo León under the 2023 districting plan

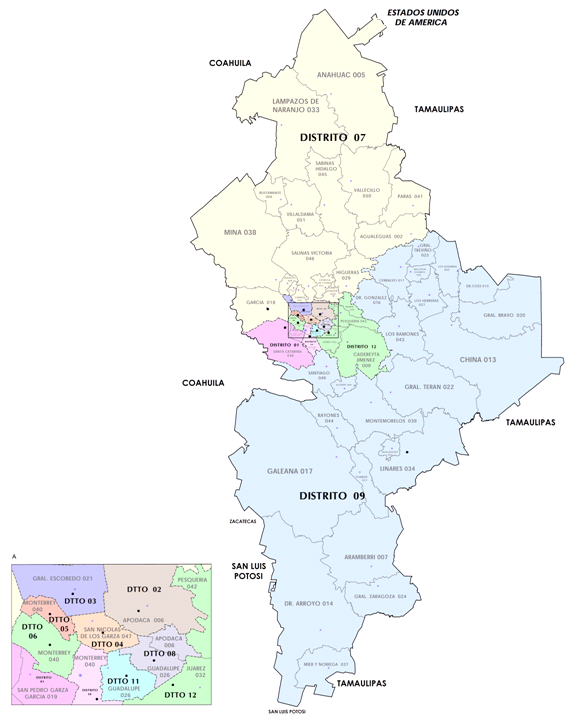
Nuevo León's districts in 2017–2022

The 7th federal electoral district of Nuevo León (Spanish: Distrito electoral federal 07 de Nuevo León) is one of the 300 electoral districts into which Mexico is divided for elections to the federal Chamber of Deputies and one of 14 such districts in the state of Nuevo León.

It elects one deputy to the lower house of Congress for each three-year legislative session by means of the first-past-the-post system. Votes cast in the district also count towards the calculation of proportional representation ("plurinominal") deputies elected from the second region.

The current member for the district, elected in the 2024 general election, is Carlos Alberto Guevara Garza of the Ecologist Green Party of Mexico (PVEM).

== District territory ==
In its 2023 districting plan, which is to be used for the 2024, 2027 and 2030 federal elections, the National Electoral Institute (INE) increased Nuevo León's congressional seat allocation from 12 to 14. The reconfigured 7th district is in the Monterrey metropolitan area and covers the 136 electoral precincts (secciones electorales) that make up the municipality of García, Nuevo León.

The district's head town (cabecera distrital), where results from individual polling stations are gathered together and tallied, is in the Valle de Lincoln neighbourhood of the municipality. The district reported a population of 397,071 in the 2020 census.

== Previous districting schemes ==
Evolution of electoral district numbers
	1974	1978	1996	2005	2017	2023
Nuevo León	7	11	11	12	12	14
Chamber of Deputies	196	300				

2017–2022

Between 2017 and 2022, the district's head town was at García and it covered that municipality and a further 16 municipalities to the north of the state: Abasolo, Agualeguas, Anáhuac, Bustamante, Carmen, Ciénega de Flores, García, General Zuazua, Hidalgo, Higueras, Lampazos de Naranjo, Mina, Parás, Sabinas Hidalgo, Salinas Victoria, Vallecillo and Villaldama.

2005–2017

Under the 2005 districting plan, the district covered 316 precincts in the municipality of Monterrey, with the remainder of the municipality assigned to the 5th, 6th and 10th districts.

1996–2005

From 1996 to 2005, the district comprised 291 precincts in the centre of the municipality of Monterrey, with the remainder of the municipality assigned to the 5th, 6th and 10th districts.

1978–1996

The districting scheme in force from 1978 to 1996 was the result of the 1977 electoral reforms, which increased the number of single-member seats in the Chamber of Deputies from 196 to 300. Under that plan, Nuevo León's seat allocation rose from 7 to 11. The 7th district had its head town at Garza García and it comprised the municipalities of Garza García and García and part of the city of Monterrey.

== Deputies returned to Congress ==
(Mexico) National parties
- Current
- PAN
- PRI
- PT
- PVEM
- MC
- Morena
- PAZ
- Somos
- Defunct or local only
- PLM
- PNR
- PRM
- PNM
- PP
- PPS
- PARM
- PFCRN
- CON
- PANAL
- PSD
- PES
- PES
- PRD

Nuevo León's 7th district
Election	Deputy	Party	Term	Legislature
1979	Andrés Montemayor Hernández	Institutional Revolutionary Party	1979–1982	51st Congress
1982	Ricardo Cavazos Galván	Institutional Revolutionary Party	1982–1985	52nd Congress
1985	Romeo Flores Caballero	Institutional Revolutionary Party	1985–1988	53rd Congress
1988	Ismael Garza T. González	Institutional Revolutionary Party	1988–1991	54th Congress
1991	Eloy Cantú Segovia	Institutional Revolutionary Party	1991–1994	55th Congress
1994	Dante Decanini Livas	Institutional Revolutionary Party	1994–1997	56th Congress
1997	Israel Hurtado Acosta	National Action Party (Mexico)	1997–2000	57th Congress
2000	Raúl Gracia Guzmán	National Action Party (Mexico)	2000–2003	58th Congress
2003	Alfonso González Ruiz (Note: González Ruiz declared himself an independent on 16 March 2006.)	Institutional Revolutionary Party Independent politician	2003–2006	59th Congress
2006	Cristian Castaño Contreras	National Action Party (Mexico)	2006–2009	60th Congress
2009	Felipe Enríquez Hernández	Institutional Revolutionary Party	2009–2012	61st Congress
2012	José Martín López Cisneros	National Action Party (Mexico)	2012–2015	62nd Congress
2015	Pablo Elizondo García	Institutional Revolutionary Party	2015–2018	63rd Congress
2018	Laura Erika de Jesús Garza Gutiérrez	Social Encounter Party	2018–2021	64th Congress
2021	Andrés Pintos Caballero (Note: Pintos Caballero switched from the PVEM to MC on 17 April 2022.)	Ecologist Green Party of Mexico Citizens' Movement (Mexico)	2021–2024	65th Congress
2024	Carlos Alberto Guevara Garza	Ecologist Green Party of Mexico	2024–2027	66th Congress

== Presidential elections ==
Nuevo León's 7th district
Election	District won by	Party or coalition	%
2018	Andrés Manuel López Obrador	Juntos Haremos Historia	40.4838
2024	Claudia Sheinbaum Pardo	Sigamos Haciendo Historia	61.3857
