= Juárez, Nuevo León =

Ciudad Benito Juárez
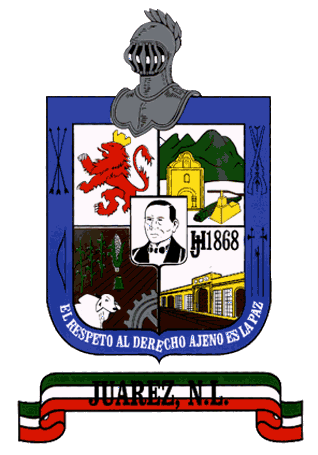
- Coat of arms
- Motto(s): El respeto al derecho ajeno es la paz (Respect to other's rights, is peace)
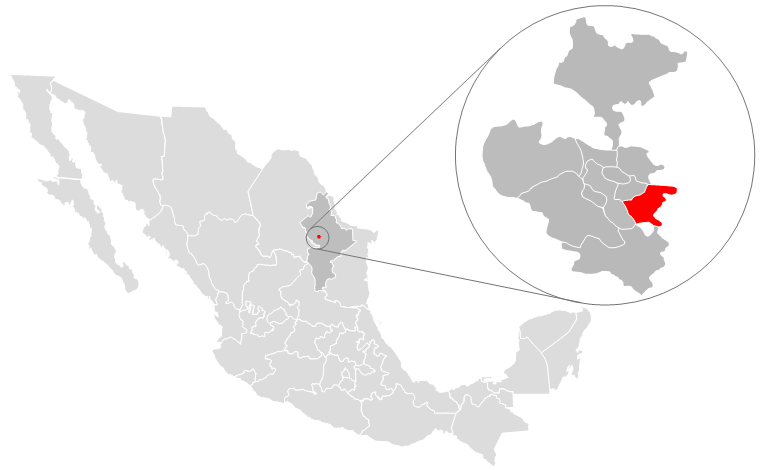
- Coordinates: 25°39′N 100°05′W
- Country: Mexico
- State: Nuevo León
- Founded: June 15, 1604

Government
  - Mayor: Francisco Héctor Treviño Cantú (2021-2024)
  - Federal electoral district: Nuevo León's 12th

Area
  - City: 39.32 km^{2} (15.18 sq mi)
- Elevation: 403 m (1,322 ft)

Population (2020 census)
  - City: 308,285
  - Density: 7,840/km^{2} (20,310/sq mi)
  - Metro: 5,341,177
- Time zone: UTC-6 (Zona Centro)
- Website: http://juarez-nl.gob.mx

Ciudad Benito Juárez, or simply Juárez, is the name of a city located in the eastern part of the Monterrey metropolitan area in the Mexican state of Nuevo León. It is the seat of the municipality of the same name. Ciudad Benito Juárez had a 2020 census population of 308,285 and is the sixth-largest city in Nuevo León. It shares borders with the municipalities of Pesquería to the north; to the south with Santiago; to the east with Cadereyta Jiménez; and to the west with Guadalupe.

== Origin of the name ==
The city was named in honor of 19th century Mexican president Benito Juárez.

== History ==
Founded as "Hacienda de San José" or "Hacienda San José de los González" on June 15, 1604. The governor of the state of Nuevo León, Martín de Zavala, granted the lands for settlement to Bernabé González Hidalgo on April 1, 1642.

The congress of the state decreed on March 1, 1850, the foundation of a new district with the name "El Rosario", within then "Hacienda de Villa". This new district was part of the municipality of Cadereyta until 1868.

On December 30, 1868, General Jerónimo Treviño, governor of the state of Nuevo León, decreed that the "Villa de Juárez" (Juarez's Village) will be founded and recognized in the same area "El Rosario" occupied. As all of the other present-day municipalities of the state, Juárez was part of the system of villages used in the 19th century. These villages were founded in order to exploit the natural resources of the zone.

Villa de Juárez was granted the title of city in May, 1988 with the name of "Ciudad Benito Juárez".

=== Present day ===
The city is going under a heavy process of urbanization and construction of houses and residential complexes, as all of the inner municipalities part of the Monterrey metropolitan area have no more room available.

== Geography ==
The municipality has an extension of 277.8 km^{2} and located at an altitude of 403 meters above the sea level. The territory is mountainous, but with not important elevations, with around 70% of plain or semi-plain lands and 30% of rugged terrain. The lands are crossed by River La Silla, that joins River Santa Catarina in a place called "Las adjuntas". River La Silla joins River San Juan in the municipality of Cadereyta Jiménez.

=== Climate ===
With a BSH climate, dry and hot. Juárez's annual average temperature is 22 °C, and its annual rain precipitation is 400 mm. Dominant winds comes from the north.

== Government ==
Ciudad Benito Juárez is a municipality governed by a democratic elected Presidente Municipal (Municipal President or Mayor) for a period of 3 years with no right to reelection. The political environment is one of civility.

The City Council of Juárez (Cabildo de Juárez) is an organ integrated by the mayor, the Regidores and the Síndicos. The mayor is the executor of the determinations of the City Council and the person directly in charge of the public municipal administration. The Regidores represent the community and their mission is to collectively define the city policies in all the subjects affecting it. The Síndicos are in charge of watching and legally defend the city interests, as well as in charge of watching the City Treasury status and the municipal patrimony.

The current mayor of Juárez is Rodolfo Ambriz Oviedo from the National Action Party (PAN), who was elected in the past municipal election on July 1, 2012, and will remain in office until 2015.

The political parties with representation in the city are the Institutional Revolutionary Party or PRI, the National Action Party or PAN, the Party of the Democratic Revolution or PRD, the Labor Party or PT, the Green Party, Convergence, Social Democratic and Farmer Alternative and Nueva Alianza.
