= Alfonso González Ruiz =

Mexican politician

- Born: 21 September 1959 (age 66); Nuevo León, Mexico
- Other name: Poncho
- Occupation: Politician

Alfonso González Ruiz (born 21 September 1959) is a Mexican politician.

In the 2003 mid-terms he was elected to the Chamber of Deputies to represent Nuevo León's 7th district during the 59th session of Congress. Originally elected for the Institutional Revolutionary Party (PRI), he declared himself an independent on 16 March 2006.
