= El Buen Fin =

Shopping promotion in Mexico

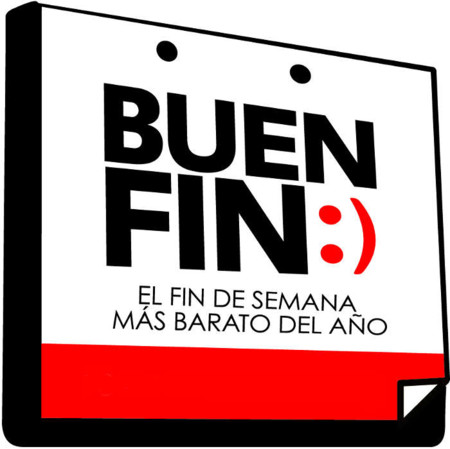
- Observed by: Mexico
- Celebrations: Shopping
- Date: Weekend prior to the Mexican Revolution holiday.
- Related to: Black Friday, Day of the Revolution, and Christmas

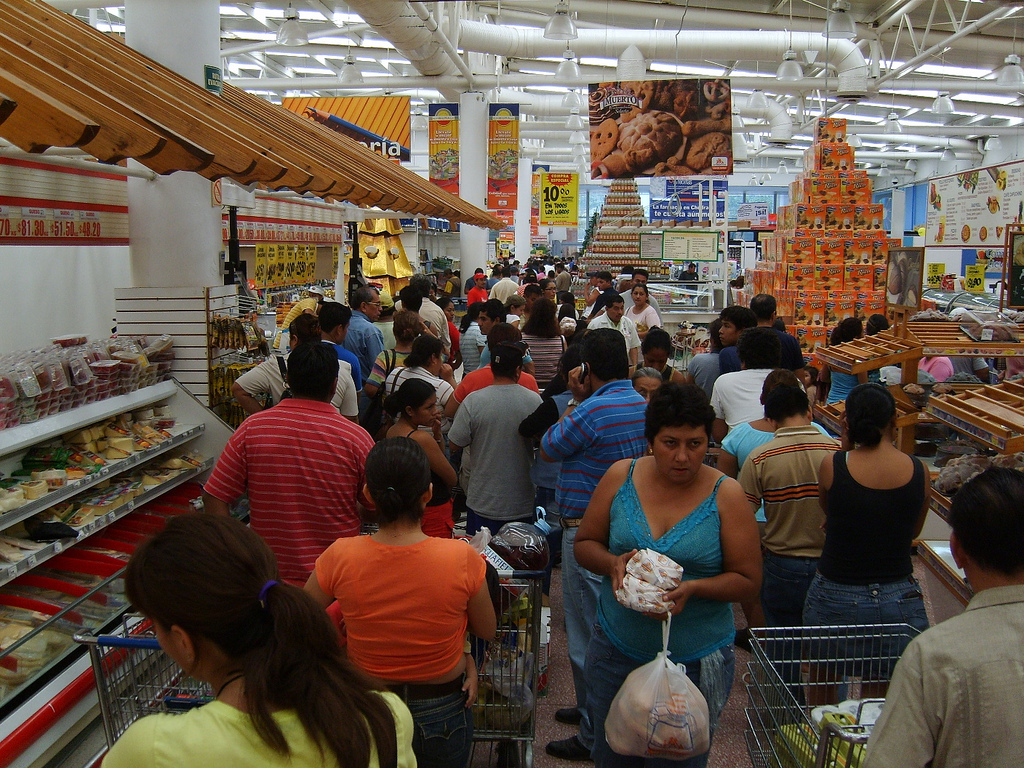

El Buen Fin (short for "El Buen Fin de Semana," meaning "The Good Weekend") is an annual nationwide shopping event in Mexico, starting in 2011. It occurs the weekend before Mexican Revolution Day, which is observed on November 20. On this weekend, major retailers extend their store hours and offer special promotions, including extended credit terms and price promotions.

The purpose of El Buen Fin is to stimulate the economy by encouraging consumption and to improve quality of life through promotions and discounts. It was inspired by the American tradition of Black Friday and emerged as an initiative of Council of Business Coordination, in association with the federal government and private sector organizations.

== History ==
Mexican President Felipe Calderón stated his belief that this move will cushion Mexican economy from the threats of European and US economic difficulties.

The event is organized by

- the Bancos de México's Association
- Mexican Internet Association
- National Association of Supermarkets and Departmental Stores (ANTAD)
- Council of Business Coordinator
- Bosses Confederation of the Mexican Republic (COPARMEX)
- Confederation of National Chambers of Trade, Services and Tourism (Concanaco Servytur)
- Confederation of Industrial Chambers of the United States of Mexico (CONCAMIN), and
- Iniciativa México, in coordination with the Mexico's federal government.

Since 2011, retailers have run campaigns marketing El Buen Fin to be the best time of the year to buy goods. Critics say that Mexico's Black Friday deals are not helpful for Mexican consumers causing them to go into unnecessary debt as most of the offers are monthly payment deals, package deals (i.e. buy 2, get 1 free) or store credit deals (get $300 for every $1000 spent, for example) and not real discounts. Others, such as furniture store chain Famsa, see it as an opportunity to attract North American buyers, especially in the border cities such as Tijuana, Ciudad Juárez or Reynosa, along with South Texas and Rio Grande Valley consumers to stores in its flagship Monterrey market, as El Buen Fin is scheduled to be about one or two weeks before the US Black Friday.

Mexican civil society consumer rights watchdog El Poder del Consumidor has said that this economic activity has pushed more Mexicans to credit card debts.

Sales during El Buen Fin 2019 reached MXN $118 billion, and 115,279 establishments participated in 2019.
