= Felipe Enríquez Hernández =

Mexican diplomat and politician

- Born: 6 March 1969 (age 57); Monterrey, Nuevo León, Mexico
- Education: UANL
- Occupations: Diplomat and politician
- Political party: PRI

Felipe Enríquez Hernández (Note: In this Mexican name, the surname is Enríquez and the second or maternal family name is Hernández.) (born 6 March 1969) is a Mexican diplomat and politician from the Institutional Revolutionary Party (PRI). In the 2009 mid-terms he was elected to the Chamber of Deputies to represent Nuevo León's 7th district during the 61st session of Congress. He previously served in the Congress of Nuevo León from 2006 to 2009.

In 2013 he was appointed ambassador to Uruguay. During his time in Uruguay, he offered President José Mujica 10 four-wheel drive pickup trucks in exchange for his 1987 Volkswagen Beetle.
