= Rogelio Cerda Pérez =

Mexican politician

- Born: 21 November 1951 (age 74); Monterrey, Nuevo León, Mexico
- Occupation: Politician
- Political party: PRI

Rogelio Cerda Pérez (born 21 November 1951) is a Mexican politician from the Institutional Revolutionary Party (PRI). In the 2009 mid-terms he was elected to the Chamber of Deputies to represent Nuevo León's 12th district during the 61st session of Congress.
