= Trust certificate (finance) =

In finance, a trust certificate is a corporate bond backed by other securities, usually a parent corporation borrowing against securities of its subsidiaries.
