= Area codes in Mexico by code (800–899) =

The 800–899 range of area codes in Mexico is reserved for the states of Coahuila, Durango, Nuevo León, San Luis Potosí, Tamaulipas, and Veracruz. The country code of Mexico is 52.

For other areas, see Area codes in Mexico by code.

City	State	Code	Ref.
Hualahuises	Nuevo León	821	
Iturbide	Nuevo León	821	
Linares	Nuevo León	821	
China	Nuevo León	823	
Doctor Coss	Nuevo León	823	
Garza González	Nuevo León	823	
General Bravo	Nuevo León	823	
General Tapia (Mariano Escobedo)	Nuevo León	823	
Los Herreras	Nuevo León	823	
Los Ramones	Nuevo León	823	
San Vicente	Nuevo León	823	
Garza Ayala	Nuevo León	824	
Los Colorados de Abajo	Nuevo León	824	
Sabinas Hidalgo	Nuevo León	824	
Vallecillo	Nuevo León	824	
Ciénaga de Flores	Nuevo León	825	
Doctor González	Nuevo León	825	
Dulces Nombres	Nuevo León	825	
General Zuazua	Nuevo León	825	
Higueras	Nuevo León	825	
Marín	Nuevo León	825	
Pesqueria	Nuevo León	825	
Allende	Nuevo León	826	
Aramberri	Nuevo León	826	
Atongo de Abajo	Nuevo León	826	
Catarino Rodríguez (El Potosí)	Nuevo León	826	
Congregación Calles	Nuevo León	826	
El Fraile	Nuevo León	826	
Galeana	Nuevo León	826	
General Terán	Nuevo León	826	
General Terán	Nuevo León	826	
General Zaragoza	Nuevo León	826	
La Ascensión	Nuevo León	826	
Laguna de Labradores	Nuevo León	826	
Montemorelos	Nuevo León	826	
Pablillo	Nuevo León	826	
Rayones	Nuevo León	826	
San José de Raíces	Nuevo León	826	
San Rafael	Nuevo León	826	
Cadereyta	Nuevo León	828	
Cadereyta	Nuevo León	828	
El Barranquito	Nuevo León	828	
San Juan	Nuevo León	828	
Bustamante	Nuevo León	829	
El Potrero	Nuevo León	829	
Hidalgo	Nuevo León	829	
Mina	Nuevo León	829	
Villa Aldama	Nuevo León	829	
Antiguo Morelos	Tamaulipas	831	
Celaya	Tamaulipas	831	
Ciudad Mante	Tamaulipas	831	
Division del Norte	Tamaulipas	831	
El Abra	Tamaulipas	831	
El Limón	Tamaulipas	831	
Fortines y Emiliano Zapata	Tamaulipas	831	
Francisco I. Madero	Tamaulipas	831	
Los Aztecas	Tamaulipas	831	
Nuevo Tantoán	Tamaulipas	831	
Plan de Ayala	Tamaulipas	831	
Quintero	Tamaulipas	831	
San Miguel de la Mora	Tamaulipas	831	
Tantoyuquita	Tamaulipas	831	
Adolfo López Mateos (Chamal Nuevo)	Tamaulipas	832	
Bustamante	Tamaulipas	832	
El Azúcar	Tamaulipas	832	
Jaumave	Tamaulipas	832	
Llera de Canales	Tamaulipas	832	
Loma Alta de Gómez Farias	Tamaulipas	832	
Miquihuana	Tamaulipas	832	
Ocampo	Tamaulipas	832	
Palmillas	Tamaulipas	832	
Segunda Unidad Xicotencatl (Aquishe)	Tamaulipas	832	
Tula	Tamaulipas	832	
Xicoténcatl	Tamaulipas	832	
Altamira	Tamaulipas	833	
Ciudad Madero	Tamaulipas	833	
Lomas del Real	Tamaulipas	833	
Tampico	Tamaulipas	833	
Anáhuac, Veracruz	Veracruz	833	
Ciudad Cuauhtémoc	Veracruz	833	
El Magozal	Veracruz	833	
El Moralillo	Veracruz	833	
Hidalgotitlán	Veracruz	833	
Tampico Alto	Veracruz	833	
Aquilés Serdán	Tamaulipas	834	
Ciudad Victoria	Tamaulipas	834	
Congregación Caballeros	Tamaulipas	834	
La Presa	Tamaulipas	834	
Abasolo	Tamaulipas	835	
Allende	Tamaulipas	835	
Casas	Tamaulipas	835	
El Barretal	Tamaulipas	835	
Estación Santa Engracia	Tamaulipas	835	
Gsemez	Tamaulipas	835	
Guadalupe Victoria	Tamaulipas	835	
Hidalgo	Tamaulipas	835	
La Pesca	Tamaulipas	835	
Magueyes	Tamaulipas	835	
Nicolas Bravo (Palo Alto)	Tamaulipas	835	
Nuevo Morelos	Tamaulipas	835	
Nuevo Padilla	Tamaulipas	835	
San Carlos	Tamaulipas	835	
Santander Jiménez	Tamaulipas	835	
Soto la Marina	Tamaulipas	835	
Tampiquito (Soto la Marina)	Tamaulipas	835	
Villa Mainero	Tamaulipas	835	
Villagrán	Tamaulipas	835	
Estación Cuauhtémoc	Tamaulipas	836	
Estación Manuel	Tamaulipas	836	
Esteros	Tamaulipas	836	
González	Tamaulipas	836	
Graciano Sánchez	Tamaulipas	836	
Estación Colonias	Tamaulipas	836	
López Rayón	Tamaulipas	836	
Río Tamiahua	Tamaulipas	836	
San Antonio Rayón	Tamaulipas	836	
Santa Fé	Tamaulipas	836	
Villa Aldama	Tamaulipas	836	
Burgos	Tamaulipas	841	
Carboneras (La Carbonera)	Tamaulipas	841	
Cruillas	Tamaulipas	841	
El Maguey	Tamaulipas	841	
General Francisco Villa	Tamaulipas	841	
Gral. Fco. González Villarreal (San Juan)	Tamaulipas	841	
La Carreta Dos	Tamaulipas	841	
San Fernando	Tamaulipas	841	
San Germán	Tamaulipas	841	
Santa Teresa	Tamaulipas	841	
Villa de Méndez	Tamaulipas	841	
General Cepeda	Coahuila	842	
Parras de la Fuente	Coahuila	842	
Concepción del Oro	Zacatecas	842	
Mazapil	Zacatecas	842	
San Tiburcio	Zacatecas	842	
Arteaga	Coahuila	844	
Ramos Arizpe	Coahuila	844	
Saltillo	Coahuila	844	
San Antonio de las Alazanas	Coahuila	844	
Aurelio Manrique	San Luis Potosí	845	
Ebano	San Luis Potosí	845	
Plan de Iguala	San Luis Potosí	845	
Ponciano Arriaga	San Luis Potosí	845	
Pujal Coy	San Luis Potosí	845	
Santa Martha	San Luis Potosí	845	
Buenavista (Ejido Buena Vista)	Veracruz	846	
Chijol 17	Veracruz	846	
Colonia Piloto	Veracruz	846	
Huayalejo	Veracruz	846	
Las Cucharas	Veracruz	846	
Lázaro Cárdenas	Veracruz	846	
Nuevo Michoacán	Veracruz	846	
Ozuluama	Veracruz	846	
Pánuco	Veracruz	846	
Poza Del Tule	Veracruz	846	
Tamos	Veracruz	846	
Vega de Otates	Veracruz	846	
Vichinchijol Nuevo	Veracruz	846	
Villa Cacalilao	Veracruz	846	
Don Martín	Coahuila	861	
Juárez	Coahuila	861	
Nueva Rosita	Coahuila	861	
Progreso	Coahuila	861	
Sabinas	Coahuila	861	
San José de Aura	Coahuila	861	
San Juan de Sabinas	Coahuila	861	
Allende	Coahuila	862	
Guerrero	Coahuila	862	
Morelos	Coahuila	862	
Nava	Coahuila	862	
Río Bravo	Coahuila	862	
Villa Unión	Coahuila	862	
Zaragoza	Coahuila	862	
Las Esperanzas	Coahuila	864	
Minas de Barroterán	Coahuila	864	
Minas La Florida	Coahuila	864	
Muzquiz	Coahuila	864	
Palau	Coahuila	864	
Abasolo	Coahuila	866	
Castaños	Coahuila	866	
Frontera	Coahuila	866	
Monclova	Coahuila	866	
Ocho de Enero	Coahuila	866	
Primero de Mayo	Coahuila	866	
Guadalupe	Nuevo León	866	
Hidalgo	Coahuila	867	
Colombia, Nuevo León	Nuevo León	867	
Nuevo Laredo	Tamaulipas	867	
Alfredo V. Bonfil	Tamaulipas	868	
El Control	Tamaulipas	868	
Matamoros	Tamaulipas	868	
Sandoval	Tamaulipas	868	
Santa Adelaida	Tamaulipas	868	
Cuatrocienegas	Coahuila	869	
Lamadrid	Coahuila	869	
Nadadores	Coahuila	869	
Ocampo	Coahuila	869	
Sacramento	Coahuila	869	
San Buenaventura	Coahuila	869	
El Cambio	Coahuila	871	
El Coyote	Coahuila	871	
Escuadron Doscientos Uno	Coahuila	871	
Hidalgo	Coahuila	871	
Juan Eugenio	Coahuila	871	
La Esperanza	Coahuila	871	
La Flor de Mayo y La Barca	Coahuila	871	
La Luz	Coahuila	871	
La Partida	Coahuila	871	
La Paz	Coahuila	871	
Matamoros	Coahuila	871	
Purísima	Coahuila	871	
Santo Niño Aguanaval	Coahuila	871	
Torreón	Coahuila	871	
California	Durango	871	
Ciudad Lerdo	Durango	871	
El Vergel	Durango	871	
Esmeralda	Durango	871	
Estación Noé	Durango	871	
Gómez Palacio	Durango	871	
La Goma	Durango	871	
La Popular	Durango	871	
Nazareno	Durango	871	
Pastor Rouaix	Durango	871	
Picardías	Durango	871	
San Felipe	Durango	871	
San Jacinto	Durango	871	
Sapioris	Durango	871	
Seis de Enero	Durango	871	
Villa Gregorio García	Durango	871	
Villa Juárez	Durango	871	
El Retiro	Coahuila	872	
Francisco I. Madero	Coahuila	872	
La Concordia (Rosita)	Coahuila	872	
Laguna del Rey	Coahuila	872	
Lequeitio	Coahuila	872	
Luchana	Coahuila	872	
Mayran	Coahuila	872	
San Ignacio	Coahuila	872	
San Pedro	Coahuila	872	
San Rafael de Arriba	Coahuila	872	
Bermejillo	Durango	872	
El Lucero (Arcinas)	Durango	872	
Mapimí	Durango	872	
San Francisco de Horizonte	Durango	872	
Tlahualilo de Zaragoza	Durango	872	
Candela	Coahuila	873	
Ciudad Anáhuac	Nuevo León	873	
Lampazos	Nuevo León	873	
Ciudad Acuña	Coahuila	877	
San Carlos	Coahuila	877	
Jiménez	Coahuila	878	
Piedras Negras	Coahuila	878	
Ciudad Camargo	Tamaulipas	891	
Gustavo Díaz Ordaz	Tamaulipas	891	
Los Comales	Tamaulipas	891	
Santa Rosalía	Tamaulipas	891	
Valadeces	Tamaulipas	891	
Agualeguas	Nuevo León	892	
Cerralvo	Nuevo León	892	
General Treviño	Nuevo León	892	
Los Aldamas	Nuevo León	892	
Melchor Ocampo	Nuevo León	892	
Villa de Paras	Nuevo León	892	
Anáhuac	Tamaulipas	894	
Empalme	Tamaulipas	894	
Mario Souza	Tamaulipas	894	
Santa Apolonia	Tamaulipas	894	
Valle Hermoso	Tamaulipas	894	
Arcabuz	Tamaulipas	897	
Ciudad Mier	Tamaulipas	897	
Ciudad Miguel Alemán	Tamaulipas	897	
Guardados de Arriba	Tamaulipas	897	
Los Guerra	Tamaulipas	897	
Nueva Ciudad Guerrero	Tamaulipas	897	
La Soledad	Tamaulipas	899	
Nuevo Progreso	Tamaulipas	899	
Reynosa Díaz	Tamaulipas	899	
Reynosa	Tamaulipas	899	
Río Bravo	Tamaulipas	899	
