= XHMNL-TDT =

State-owned public television station in Monterrey, Nuevo León, Mexico

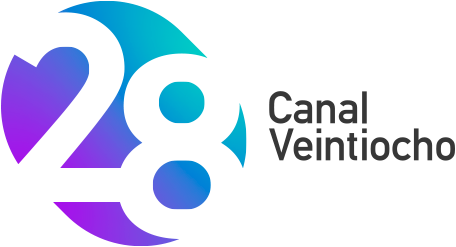
- Monterrey, Nuevo León; Mexico
- Channels: Digital: 28 (UHF); Virtual: 28
- Branding: Canal 28

Ownership
- Owner: Gobierno del Estado de Nuevo León

History
- Founded: May 14, 1982
- Former call signs: XHMNL-TV (1982–2015)
- Former channel numbers: Analog: 28 (UHF; 1982-2015)
- Call sign meaning: Monterrey, Nuevo León

Technical information
- Licensing authority: CRT
- ERP: 139.54 kW (digital)
- HAAT: 190.4 m (625 ft)
- Transmitter coordinates: 25°37′33″N 100°19′15″W

Links
- Website: srtvnl.com

Canal 28 (call sign XHMNL-TDT) is an educational and public television station owned and operated by the government of the Mexican state of Nuevo León. It is part of Radio y Televisión de Nuevo León and broadcasts on 24 transmitters serving the entire state.

== History ==
XHMNL-TV and its Monterrey transmitter signed on May 14, 1982, as part of the Televisión de la República Mexicana/Televisión Rural de México system. The original offices were located on the 27th and 28th floors of the Latino Building in Monterrey.

In 1984 XHMNL broke from the network and became a station focused on Monterrey and Nuevo León, under the auspices of the state government; the next year it moved to its current facilities on San Francisco Avenue. Channel 28's transmitter is located on Cerro del Mirador.

On September 24, 2015, XHMNL in Monterrey shut off its analog signal and began exclusively broadcasting in digital on channel 28. Other transmitters followed in December 2016, with the state network adopting 28 as its virtual channel.

In May 2017, TVNL (TV Nuevo León) began branding as Canal 28 with a new logo and slogan.

On September 5, 2018, the Federal Telecommunications Institute approved the conversion of Canal 28 into a common-concession state network that could build new repeaters anywhere in Nuevo León, with the existing 23 repeaters of XHMNL-TDT losing their individual concessions and call signs and 14 of them being moved to channel 28 to form a single-frequency network. This was effectuated on April 29, 2019, with the surrender of the 23 associated concessions.

== Programs ==
Channel 28 broadcasts a variety of cultural, public affairs, news, sports and other programs.

== Transmitters ==
The state government owns 24 transmitters carrying Canal 28 programming. After the 2019 conversion, all transmitters were moved to channel 27, 28, or 29.

RF	Location	ERP
27	Agualeguas	.205 kW
28	Aramberri	0.5 kW
27	Cerralvo-Melchor Ocampo	.5 kW
28	Anáhuac	.5 kW
28	Doctor Arroyo	.542 kW
29	Doctor Coss	.2 kW
27	General Bravo–General Tapia	.2 kW
29	General Treviño	.198 kW
28	General Zaragoza	.2 kW
27	Higueras	.2 kW
28	Iturbide	.5 kW
28	La Chona, Aramberri	.2 kW
27	Lampazos de Naranjo	.2 kW
28	Linares	.5 kW
27	Los Aldamas-Estación Los Aldama	.5025 kW
27	Los Herreras	.2053 kW
27	Los Ramones	.2053 kW
28	Mier y Noriega	.2053 kW
28	Monterrey	139.54 kW
29	Parás	.2026 kW
28	Rayones	.2 kW
28	Sabinas Hidalgo	.5 kW
27	Vallecillo	.1 kW
27	Villaldama-Bustamante	.5 kW

In March 2018, in order to facilitate the repacking of TV services out of the 600 MHz band (channels 38-51), the Mier y Noriega transmitter, then with the call sign XHMNG, was assigned channel 27 for continued digital operations. It was moved to channel 28 when reauthorized under the XHMNL concession.
