= Municipalities of Nuevo León =

List of municipalities of Mexican state

Map of Mexico with Nuevo León highlighted

Nuevo León is a state in northeast Mexico that is divided into 51 municipalities. According to the 2020 INEGI census, it is the seventh most populated state with 5,784,442 inhabitants and the 13th largest by land area spanning 64,156.2 square kilometres (24,770.8 sq mi).

Municipalities in Nuevo León are administratively autonomous of the state according to the 115th article of the 1917 Constitution of Mexico. Every three years, citizens elect a municipal president (Spanish: presidente municipal) by a plurality voting system who heads a concurrently elected municipal council (ayuntamiento) responsible for providing all the public services for their constituents. The municipal council consists of a variable number of trustees and councillors (regidores y síndicos). Municipalities are responsible for public services (such as water and sewerage), street lighting, public safety, traffic, and the maintenance of public parks, gardens and cemeteries. They may also assist the state and federal governments in education, emergency fire and medical services, environmental protection and maintenance of monuments and historical landmarks. Since 1984, they have had the power to collect property taxes and user fees, although more funds are obtained from the state and federal governments than from their own income.

Outside the Monterrey Metropolitan Area, the state is sparsely populated. The largest municipality by population is Monterrey, with 1,142,994 residents (19.75% of the state's total), while the smallest is Parás with 906 residents. The largest municipality by land area is Galeana which spans 7,068.30 km^{2} (2,729.09 sq mi), and the smallest is Abasolo, with 46.90 km^{2} (18.11 sq mi). The newest municipality is Melchor Ocampo, established in 1948.

Nuevo León has several distinctive municipalities: Pesquería was the fastest growing municipality in Mexico from 2010 to 2020; Hualahuises is one of the very few enclaves in Mexico, surrounded by Linares; and San Pedro Garza García has the best quality of living in Mexico and is considered among the most affluent municipalities in Latin America.

== Municipalities ==
Largest municipalities in Nuevo León by population

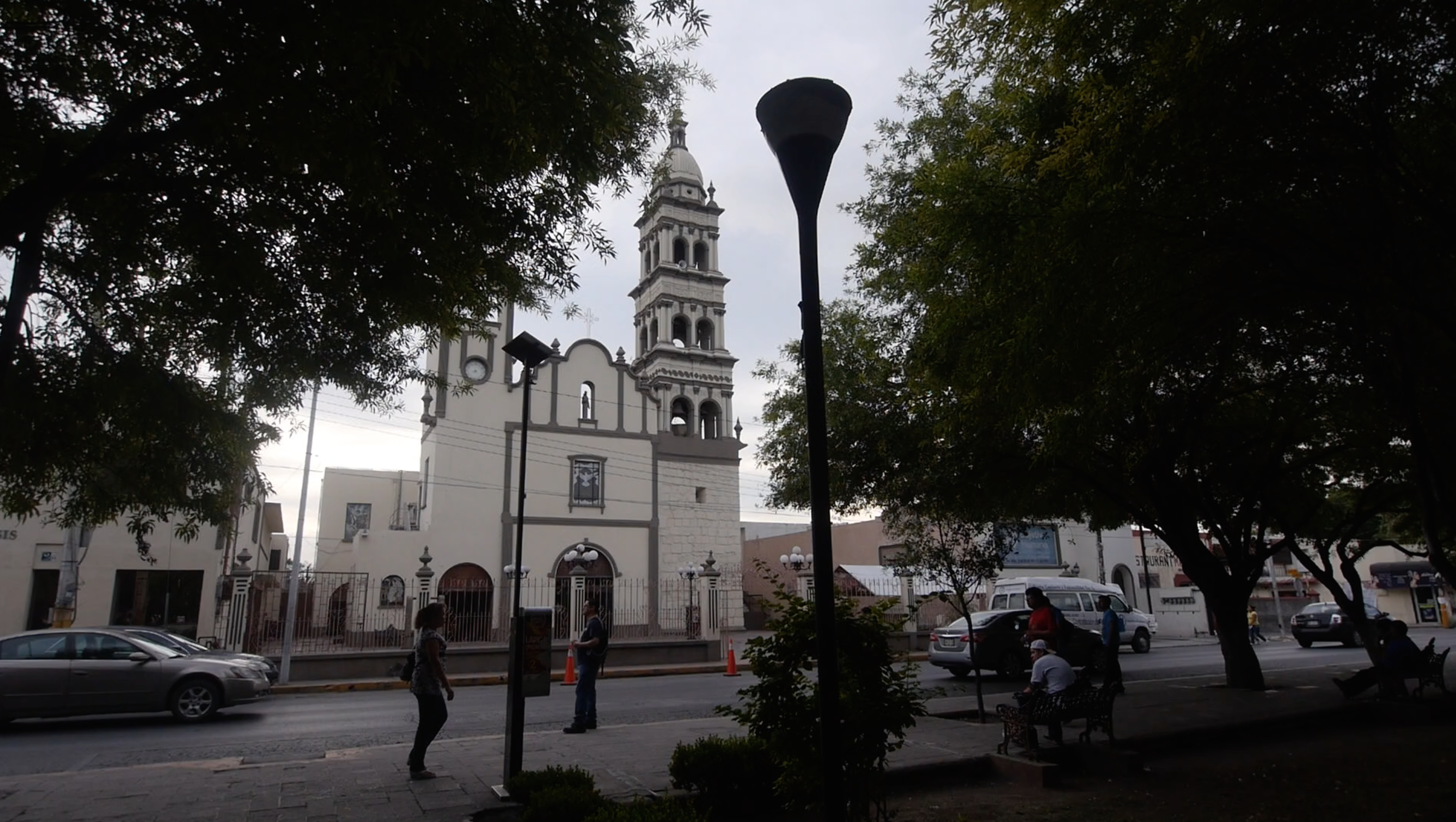
Apodaca, second largest municipality by population.

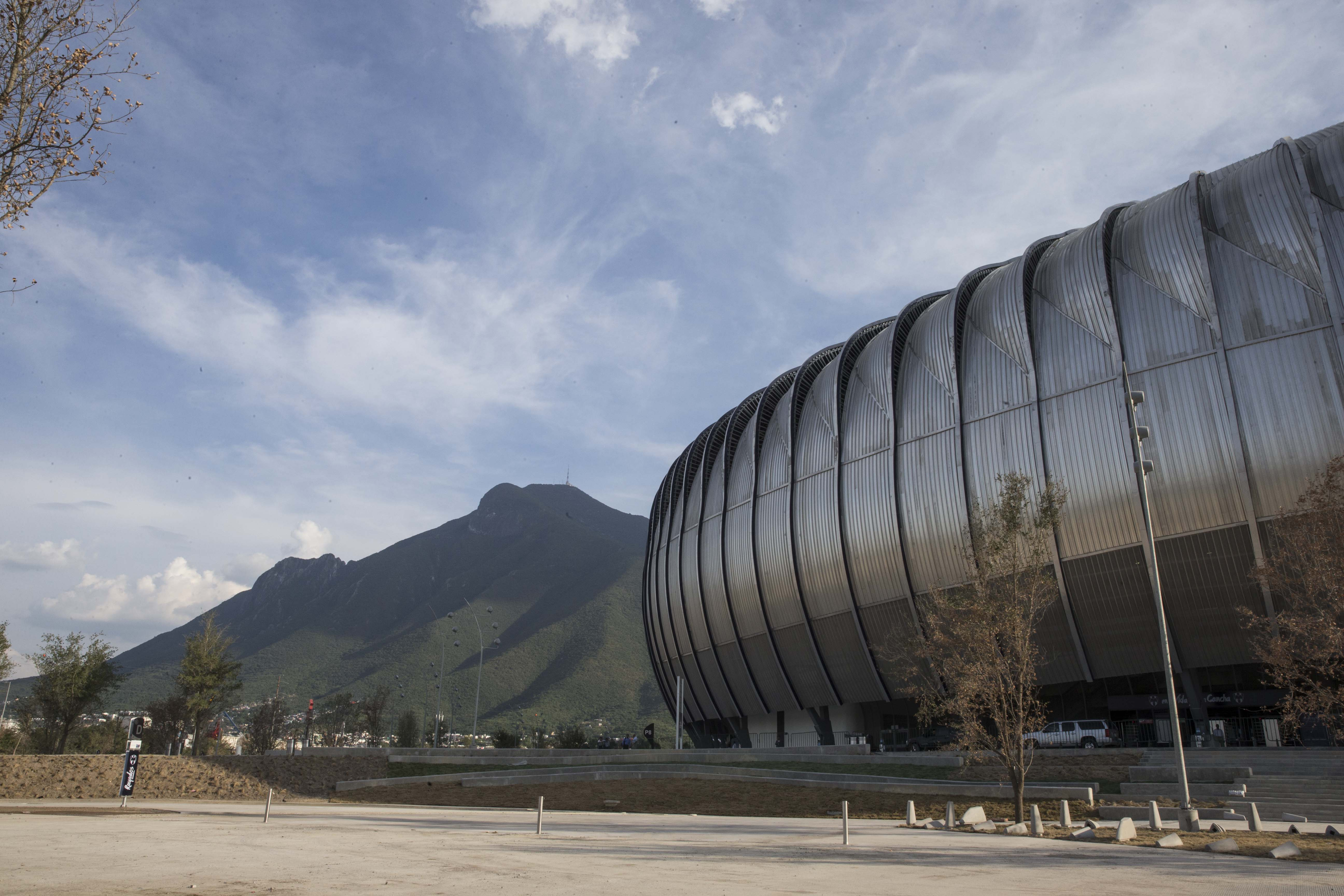
Guadalupe, third largest municipality by population.

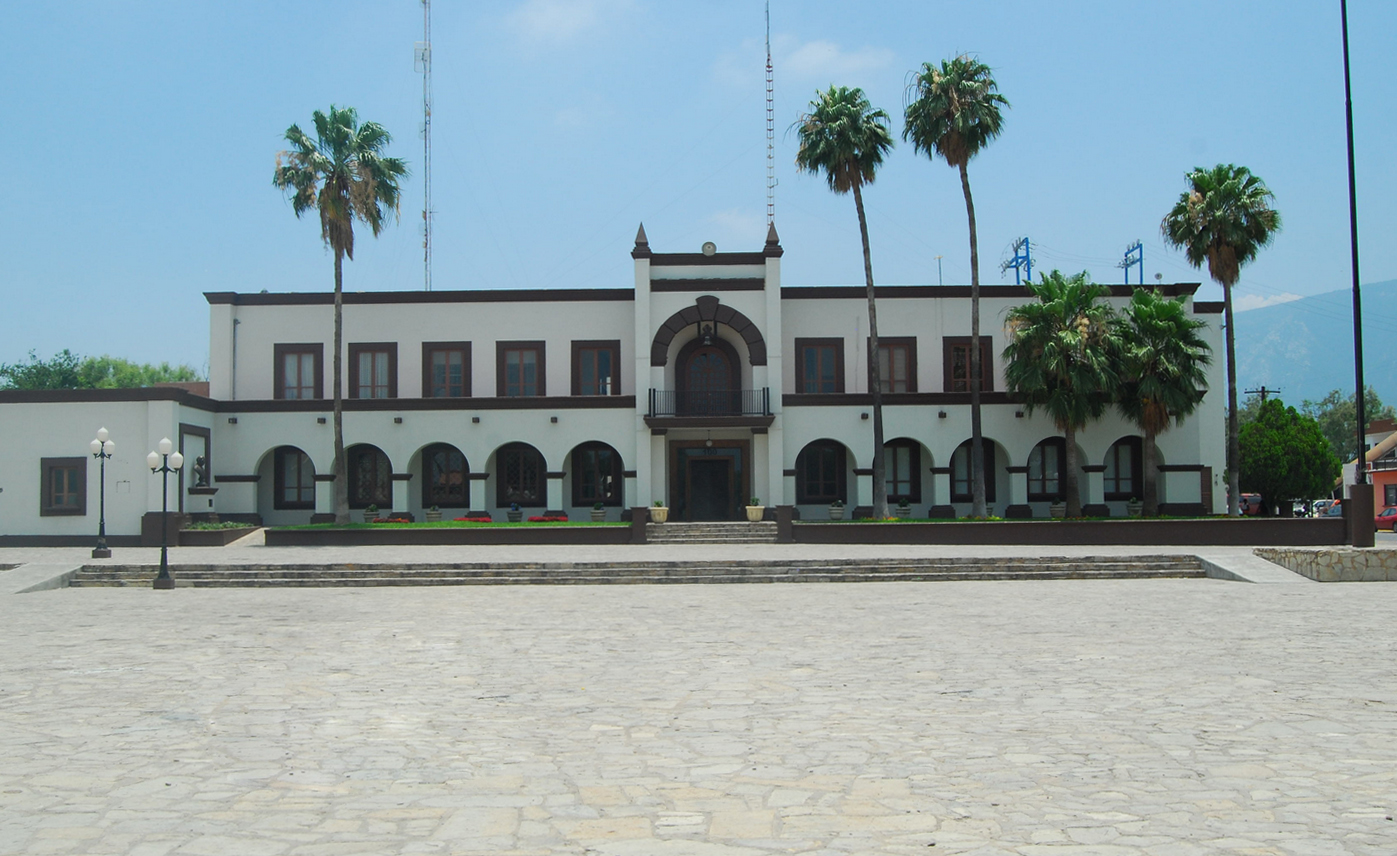
General Escobedo, fourth largest municipality by population.

† State capital

Municipalities of Nuevo León
Name	Seat	Population (2020)	Population (2010)	Change	Land area		Population density (2020)	Incorporation	Origin and Etymology	Map
Name	Seat	Population (2020)	Population (2010)	Change	km^{2}	sq mi	Population density (2020)	Incorporation	Origin and Etymology	Map
Abasolo	Abasolo	2,974	2,791	+6.6%	46.9	18.1	63.4/km^{2} (164.2/sq mi)	April 6, 1827	Founded as the Hacienda of Eguía de Viudas in 1648, renamed as Abasolo in 1826. Mariano Abasolo, revolutionist during the Mexican War of Independence.	
Agualeguas	Agualeguas	3,382	3,443	−1.8%	980.9	378.7	3.4/km^{2} (8.9/sq mi)	March 5, 1825	Founded as a mission, Santa Teresa de Alamillo. Renamed San Nicolás Gualeguas in 1675 and Agualeguas in 1793. Gualeguas, an extinct Native American nomadic tribe which scarcely inhabited this area.	
Allende	Allende	35,289	32,593	+8.3%	190.5	73.6	185.2/km^{2} (479.8/sq mi)	March 12, 1850	Founded as Rancho del Reparo in 1825, changing its name in 1850. Ignacio Allende, captain of the Spanish Army, sympathizer with the Mexican War of Independence.	
Anáhuac	Anáhuac	18,030	18,480	−2.4%	4,539.2	1,752.6	4.0/km^{2} (10.3/sq mi)	May 31, 1935	Created with land from Lampazos, Vallecillo and Juárez, Coahuila, to expand Nuevo León's border with Texas. Anáhuac, the Aztec name for the region which comprises the Valley of México.	
Apodaca	Ciudad Apodaca	656,464	523,370	+25.4%	224.0	86.5	2,930.6/km^{2} (7,590.3/sq mi)	December 29, 1845	Founded as San Francisco in 1585, changing its name on December 16, 1917. Salvador de Apodaca, former bishop of Linares.	
Aramberri	Aramberri	14,992	15,470	−3.1%	2,688.6	1,038.1	5.6/km^{2} (14.4/sq mi)	March 5, 1825	Founded as the Santa María de los Angeles in 1648, renamed as Río Blanco in 1660. Originally incorporated under that name, changing it on October 31, 1877. José Silvestre Aramberri, military general born in this municipality who fought in the Reform War.	
Bustamante	Bustamante	3,661	3,773	−3.0%	466.7	180.2	7.8/km^{2} (20.3/sq mi)	March 5, 1825	Founded in 1686 as San Miguel de Aguayo. Originally incorporated under that name, changing it on December 29, 1845. Anastasio Bustamante, president of Mexico.	
Cadereyta Jiménez	Cadereyta Jiménez	122,337	86,445	+41.5%	1,140.9	440.5	107.2/km^{2} (277.7/sq mi)	March 5, 1825	Founded as Villa de Cadereyta in 1637, known as San Juan Bautista de Cadereyta from 1692. Lope Díez de Armendáriz, 1st Marquess of Cadreita, Viceroy of New Spain. José Mariano Jiménez, rebel officer in the Mexican War of Independence.	
Cerralvo	Cerralvo	7,340	7,855	−6.6%	1,007.4	389.0	7.3/km^{2} (18.9/sq mi)	March 5, 1825	Founded in 1582, Villa of San Gregorio de Cerralvo was the first Spanish settlement and capital of Nuevo León. Rodrigo Pacheco, 3rd Marquess of Cerralvo, fifteenth Viceroy of New Spain.	
Ciénega de Flores	Ciénega de Flores	68,747	24,526	+180.3%	138.7	53.6	495.7/km^{2} (1,283.7/sq mi)	February 23, 1863	Settled as Hacienda of Ciénega de Flores in 1624, in the area known as Valle del Carrizal. Ciénega, a Spanish word for a swampy or boggy area. Flores, the surname of an early rancher of the area.	
China	China	9,930	10,864	−8.6%	4,265.7	1,647.0	2.3/km^{2} (6.0/sq mi)	March 5, 1825	Founded in 1719 as San Felipe de Jesús de China, renamed China in 1812. Doctor Coss and General Bravo were created out of their territory. Saint Philip of Jesus, Mexican Catholic missionary in China and Japan, one of the Twenty-six Martyrs of Japan	
Doctor Arroyo	Doctor Arroyo	36,088	35,445	+1.8%	5,053.7	1,951.2	7.1/km^{2} (18.5/sq mi)	April 7, 1827	Established as Valle de la Purísima Concepción in 1826, changing its name on March 31, 1851. During the Mexican Revolution, Doctor Arroyo became capita of Mexico in 1915 for 45 days. José Francisco Arroyo de Anda, doctor and first delegate to the Nuevo León's congress.	
Doctor Coss	Doctor Coss	1,360	1,716	−20.7%	720.7	278.3	1.9/km^{2} (4.9/sq mi)	March 2, 1850	Founded in 1740 as Rancho del Zacate. Merged with China in 1851-1882. José María Cos, doctor and delegate to the Congress of Chilpancingo.	
Doctor González	Doctor González	3,256	3,345	−2.7%	614.7	237.3	5.3/km^{2} (13.7/sq mi)	November 14, 1883	Founded as Hacienda de Ramos, in the Las Salinas valley area. Renamed Doctor González in 1883. José Eleuterio González, doctor, philanthropist, writer and governor of Nuevo León.	
El Carmen	El Carmen	104,478	16,092	+549.3%	104.3	40.3	1,001.7/km^{2} (2,594.4/sq mi)	February 5, 1852	Founded as Hacienda de Chipinque in 1614, part of Las Salinas valley. Our Lady of Mount Carmel, patroness of the Carmelite Order.	
Galeana	Galeana	40,903	39,991	+2.3%	7,068.3	2,729.1	5.8/km^{2} (15.0/sq mi)	March 5, 1825	Founded as San Pablo de Labradores in 1678. Originally incorporated as Labradores and renamed Galeana on February 19, 1829. Hermenegildo Galeana, hero of the Mexican War of Independence.	
García	García	397,205	143,668	+176.5%	1,032.0	398.5	384.9/km^{2} (996.9/sq mi)	March 5, 1825	Founded as Pesquería Grande in 1583. Originally incorporated under that name, renamed García on March 31, 1851. Joaquín García, former Governor of Nuevo León.	
General Bravo	General Bravo	5,506	5,527	−0.4%	1,888.6	729.2	2.9/km^{2} (7.6/sq mi)	November 18, 1868	Founded as Rancho del Toro in 1790. Established with territory from China. Nicolás Bravo, Mexican president and general in the Mexican–American War.	
General Escobedo	General Escobedo	481,213	357,937	+34.4%	149.4	57.7	3,221.0/km^{2} (8,342.3/sq mi)	February 24, 1868	Founded as Hacienda del Topo de los Ayala in 1624, renamed as Villa del General Escobedo in 1868. Mariano Escobedo, Mexican Army general and former Governor of Nuevo León.	
General Terán	General Terán	14,109	14,437	−2.3%	2,478.8	957.1	5.7/km^{2} (14.7/sq mi)	March 5, 1825	Founded as La Mota in 1746. Originally incorporated under that name, renamed General Terán on March 31, 1851. Manuel de Mier y Terán, military general in the Mexican War of Independence.	
General Treviño	General Treviño	1,808	1,277	+41.6%	387.9	149.8	4.7/km^{2} (12.1/sq mi)	December 3, 1868	Settled as Rancho del Puntiagudo in 1688, renamed to General Treviño in 1868. Jerónimo Treviño, military general in the Reform War and former Governor of Nuevo León.	
General Zaragoza	General Zaragoza	6,282	5,942	+5.7%	1,306.7	504.5	4.8/km^{2} (12.5/sq mi)	September 26, 1886	Founded as San José de Río Blanco in 1626. It merged with Aramberri from 1660 to 1886. Ignacio Zaragoza, military general, led the Mexican army at the Battle of Puebla.	
General Zuazua	General Zuazua	102,149	55,213	+85.0%	184.5	71.2	553.7/km^{2} (1,434.0/sq mi)	March 6, 1863	Founded as Hacienda of Santa Helena in 1660, created out of Marín. Juan Zuazua, military general in the Reform War.	
Guadalupe	Guadalupe	643,143	678,006	−5.1%	118.4	45.7	5,432.0/km^{2} (14,068.7/sq mi)	March 5, 1825	Founded in 1714 as a Spanish mission, Nuestra Señora de Guadalupe. Our Lady of Guadalupe, patroness of Mexico and Latin America.	
Hidalgo	Hidalgo	16,086	16,604	−3.1%	170.6	65.9	94.3/km^{2} (244.2/sq mi)	February 13, 1828	Founded as Hacienda de Enmedio in 1611. Originally incorporated as San Nicolás Hidalgo, changing its name on May 30, 1923. Miguel Hidalgo y Costilla, leader of the Mexican War of Independence.	
Higueras	Higueras	1,386	1,594	−13.0%	443.2	171.1	3.1/km^{2} (8.1/sq mi)	February 18, 1863	Founded as Teresa de las Higueras in 1714. Figuera, Spanish word for the fig tree, abundant throughout the area	
Hualahuises	Hualahuises	7,026	6,914	+1.6%	127.8	49.3	55.0/km^{2} (142.4/sq mi)	March 5, 1825	Founded as the mission of San Cristóbal de los Hualahuises in 1646. Hualahuises, a Native American tribe which inhabited the area before the Spanish settlement.	
Iturbide	Iturbide	3,298	3,558	−7.3%	560.5	216.4	5.9/km^{2} (15.2/sq mi)	March 9, 1850	Agustín de Iturbide, army general and politician and first Emperor of Mexico.	
Juárez	Ciudad Benito Juárez	471,523	266,970	+76.6%	247.3	95.5	1,906.7/km^{2} (4,938.3/sq mi)	March 9, 1850	Founded as Hacienda de San José in 1604. Originally incorporated under that name, changing it on December 16, 1868. Benito Juárez, 26th president of Mexico.	
Lampazos de Naranjo	Lampazos de Naranjo	5,351	5,349	0.0%	3,428.0	1,323.6	1.6/km^{2} (4.0/sq mi)	March 5, 1825	Founded as the Mission of Nuestra Señora de la Punta de Lampazos in 1698. Originally incorporated under that name, changing it on October 4, 1847. Lampazo, Spanish word for Xanthosoma robustum, a plant that grows in this area.	
Linares	Linares	84,666	78,669	+7.6%	2,509.2	968.8	33.7/km^{2} (87.4/sq mi)	March 5, 1825	Founded as San Felipe de Linares in 1712. Fernando de Alencastre, 1st Duke of Linares and Viceroy of New Spain.	
Los Aldamas	Los Aldamas	1,407	1,374	+2.4%	694.5	268.1	2.0/km^{2} (5.2/sq mi)	May 7, 1829	Founded as the Mission of Puerto de Hoyos in 1760, renamed Santa María de los Aldamas. Brothers Ignacio Aldama and Juan Aldama, revolutionary soldiers during the Mexican War of Independence.	
Los Herreras	Los Herreras	1,959	2,030	−3.5%	496.6	191.7	3.9/km^{2} (10.2/sq mi)	December 9, 1874	Settled as Hacienda de la Manteca around 1760. Originally incorporated as Villa de los Herreras, changing its name on November 29, 1878. Brothers José Martín Herrera and Rafael Herrera, who participated in the Battle of San Bernabé in 1872.	
Los Ramones	Los Ramones	5,389	5,359	+0.6%	1,341.0	517.8	4.0/km^{2} (10.4/sq mi)	November 1, 1912	Settled as Rancho del Capadero in Cerralvo around 1750. Later annexed to Cadereyta Jiménez as Valle de San José de los Ramones. Brothers Juan Ignacio Ramón and Buenaventura Ramón, who fought in the Mexican War of Independence.	
Marín	Marín	5,119	5,488	−6.7%	264.9	102.3	19.3/km^{2} (50.0/sq mi)	March 5, 1825	Settled as Rancho de San Antonio de los Martínez in 1684, renamed Villa de San Carlos de Marín in 1804. Primo Feliciano Marín de Porras, bishop of the New Kingdom of León and honorary chaplain of Spain's king.	
Melchor Ocampo	Melchor Ocampo	1,483	862	+72.0%	207.9	80.3	7.1/km^{2} (18.5/sq mi)	October 5, 1948	Newest municipality in Nuevo León. Settled as a ranch named Charco Redondo in 1702. Melchor Ocampo, Foreign Secretary during the Reform War.	
Mier y Noriega	Mier y Noriega	7,652	7,095	+7.9%	997.9	385.3	7.7/km^{2} (19.9/sq mi)	July 27, 1849	Founded as Hacienda de San Antonio de Medina around 1715. Servando Teresa de Mier, Catholic priest and politician, involved in the Mexican War of Independence.	
Mina	Mina	6,048	5,447	+11.0%	3,860.0	1,490.4	1.6/km^{2} (4.1/sq mi)	May 30, 1837	Founded as San Francisco de Cañas in 1608, in the Las Salinas valley area. Originally incorporated under that name, changing it on March 31, 1851. Martín Javier Mina y Larrea, sympathizer with the Mexican War of Independence.	
Montemorelos	Montemorelos	67,428	59,113	+14.1%	1,869.0	721.6	36.1/km^{2} (93.4/sq mi)	March 5, 1825	Settled as San Mateo del Pilón in 1637. Originally incorporated as Pilón, changing its name on October 26, 1826. Monte, Spanish word for mountain. José María Morelos, priest and leader in the Mexican War of Independence.	
Monterrey	Monterrey†	1,142,994	1,135,550	+0.7%	324.4	125.3	3,523.4/km^{2} (9,125.6/sq mi)	March 5, 1825	First founded as Santa Lucía in 1577, formally settled as Our Lady of Monterrey in 1596. Gaspar de Zúñiga, 5th Count of Monterrey, Viceroy of New Spain, and his wife.	
Parás	Parás	906	1,034	−12.4%	1,171.2	452.2	0.8/km^{2} (2.0/sq mi)	February 17, 1851	Originally known Rancho del Huizachal de los Canales. Formally incorporated as Parás in 1851. José María Parás, first Governor of Nuevo León.	
Pesquería	Pesquería	147,624	20,843	+608.3%	322.8	124.6	457.3/km^{2} (1,184.5/sq mi)	December 29, 1845	Founded as Hacienda del Espíritu Santo in 1699, later known as Pesquería Chica. Originally incorporated under that name, changing it in 1995. From the Pesquería River, meaning fishery in Spanish.	
Rayones	Rayones	2,377	2,628	−9.6%	683.1	263.7	3.5/km^{2} (9.0/sq mi)	September 13, 1851	Founded as San Miguel del Tasajal, joined with Hacienda de los Barreales to form Los Rallones in 1851. Brothers Ramón, Francisco and Ignacio López Rayón, who fought in the Mexican War of Independence.	
Sabinas Hidalgo	Sabinas Hidalgo	34,709	34,671	+0.1%	1,541.5	595.2	22.5/km^{2} (58.3/sq mi)	March 5, 1825	Founded as Valle de Santiago de las Sabinas in 1693. Sabinas, Spanish word for junipers, coniferous plants abundant in the area. Miguel Hidalgo y Costilla, leader of the Mexican War of Independence.	
Salinas Victoria	Salinas Victoria	86,766	32,660	+165.7%	1,667.4	643.8	52.0/km^{2} (134.8/sq mi)	March 5, 1825	Founded as Villa de Cueva in 1586. Renamed as Cañón de Guadalupe de Salinas, administrative seat of Las Salinas valley. Changed its name to Salinas Victoria on May 30, 1837. "Salinas", Spanish word for salt marshes characteristic of the lands. Guadalupe Victoria, first president of Mexico.	
San Nicolás de los Garza	San Nicolás de los Garza	412,199	443,273	−7.0%	60.1	23.2	6,858.6/km^{2} (17,763.6/sq mi)	December 30, 1830	Settled in 1596, and formally founded as Estancia de los Garzas in 1634. Originally incorporated under that name, changing it on May 20, 1837. Saint Nicholas, early Christian bishop Garza, surname of Pedro de la Garza, early Spanish settler of the area.	
San Pedro Garza García	San Pedro Garza García	132,169	122,659	+7.8%	70.8	27.3	1,866.8/km^{2} (4,835.0/sq mi)	December 14, 1882	Settled as San Pedro de los Nogales in 1725. Originally incorporated as Garza García, changing its name on October 14, 1987. Saint Peter, one of the first leaders of the early Church; Genaro Garza García, Governor of Nuevo León.	
Santa Catarina	Santa Catarina	306,322	268,955	+13.9%	915.8	353.6	334.5/km^{2} (866.3/sq mi)	March 5, 1825	Founded as Hacienda de Santa Catalina in 1596, renamed Santa Catarina in 1837. Saint Catherine, an earlier Christian martyr; it was founded on the eve of Saint Catherine's day, November 24.	
Santiago	Santiago	46,784	40,469	+15.6%	739.2	285.4	63.3/km^{2} (163.9/sq mi)	March 5, 1825	Founded as Valle de Santiago del Huajuco in 1648. Originally incorporated as Guajuco, changing its name on June 30, 1831. "Santiago", Spanish name of Saint James apostle.	
Vallecillo	Vallecillo	1,552	1,971	−21.3%	1,764.9	681.4	0.9/km^{2} (2.3/sq mi)	March 5, 1825	Founded as Real de San Carlos de Vallecillo in 1768. The location of the settlement in a small valley, vallecillo in Spanish, or El Vallecillo, municipality in the province of Teruel, Spain.	
Villaldama	Villaldama	3,573	4,113	−13.1%	879.3	339.5	4.1/km^{2} (10.5/sq mi)	March 5, 1825	Founded as Boca de Leones in 1690. Originally incorporated under that name, changing it on April 18, 1827. Juan Aldama, revolutionary soldier during the Mexican War of Independence.	
Nuevo León	—	5,784,442	4,653,458	+24.3%	64,156.2	24,770.8	90.2/km^{2} (233.5/sq mi)	—	—	—
Mexico	—	126,014,024	112,336,538	+12.2%	1,960,646.7	757,010	64.3/km^{2} (166.5/sq mi)	—	—	—
