= List of sister cities in Texas =

This article is a list of sister cities in the United States state of Texas. Sister cities, known in Europe as town twins, are cities that partner with each other to promote human contact and cultural links, although this partnering is not limited to cities and often includes counties, regions, states, and other sub-national entities.

Many cities works with foreign cities through Sister Cities International, an organization whose goal is to "promote peace through mutual respect, understanding, and cooperation."

As a result of a bill passed by the Texas Legislature in 2025, all Texas sister city partnerships with cities in China, Russia, North Korea, or Iran are to be terminated.

== A ==
Abilene

- Río Cuarto, Argentina

Alton

- Cedral, Mexico

Amarillo

- Dnipro, Ukraine
- Tuxtla Gutiérrez, Mexico

Arlington

- Bad Königshofen, Germany

Austin

- Adelaide, Australia
- Angers, France
- Antalya, Turkey
- Chiang Mai, Thailand
- Gwangmyeong, South Korea
- (Republic of Ireland) Limerick, Ireland
- Koblenz, Germany
- Lima, Peru
- Maseru, Lesotho
- Ōita, Japan
- Orlu, Nigeria
- Pune, India
- Saltillo, Mexico
- Taichung, Taiwan

== B ==
Bandera

- Strzelce Opolskie, Poland
- Tysmenytsia, Ukraine

Big Spring

- Hadera, Israel
- San Miguel el Alto, Mexico

Brownsville

- Barranquilla, Colombia
- Matamoros, Mexico

Bryan

- Bastogne, Belgium
- Salamanca, Mexico
- Toruń, Poland

== C ==
Carrollton

- Guri, South Korea

Castroville

- Eguisheim, France

Cleburne

- Comonfort, Mexico

College Station

- Bastogne, Belgium
- Salamanca, Mexico
- Toruń, Poland

Conroe

- Allende, Mexico

Corpus Christi

- Agen, France
- Keelung, Taiwan
- Yokosuka, Japan

Cuero

- Miguel Alemán, Mexico

== D ==
D'Hanis

- Oberentzen, France

Dallas

- Brno, Czech Republic
- Dijon, France
- Monterrey, Mexico
- Riga, Latvia
- Sendai, Japan
- Taipei, Taiwan

Denison

- Cognac, France

DeSoto

- Taoyuan, Taiwan

== E ==
East Bernard

- Hvozdná, Czech Republic

El Paso

- Ciudad Juárez, Mexico
- Chihuahua, Mexico
- Guadalajara, Mexico
- Hadera, Israel
- Jerez de la Frontera, Spain
- Querétaro, Mexico
- Torreón, Mexico

== F ==
Farmers Branch

- Bassetlaw, England, United Kingdom
- Garbsen, Germany

Fort Worth

- Bandung, Indonesia
- Budapest, Hungary
- Guiyang, China
- Mbabane, Eswatini
- Nagaoka, Japan
- Nîmes, France
- Reggio Emilia, Italy
- Toluca, Mexico
- Trier, Germany

== G ==
Gainesville

- Sinaia, Romania

Galveston

- Macharaviaya, Spain
- Niigata, Japan
- Stavanger, Norway
- Veracruz, Mexico

Garland

- Taoyuan, Taiwan

Goliad

- Hidalgo, Mexico

Granbury

- Sinan, South Korea

Grand Prairie

- Baden, Austria
- Charlesbourg (Quebec City), Canada
- Guishan (Taoyuan), Taiwan
- Kalush, Ukraine

Grapevine

- Krems an der Donau, Austria
- Parras, Mexico
- West Lothian, Scotland, United Kingdom

== H ==
Houston

- Abu Dhabi, United Arab Emirates
- Baku, Azerbaijan
- Basra, Iraq
- Chiba, Japan
- Guayaquil, Ecuador
- Huelva, Spain
- Istanbul, Turkey
- Karachi, Pakistan
- Leipzig, Germany
- Luanda, Angola
- Nice, France
- Perth, Australia
- Shenzhen, China
- Stavanger, Norway
- Taipei, Taiwan
- Tampico, Mexico
- Ulsan, South Korea

== I ==
Irving

- Boulogne-Billancourt, France
- Darkhan, Mongolia
- Espoo, Finland
- León, Mexico
- Marino, Italy
- Merton, England, United Kingdom

Killeen

- Osan, South Korea
- San Juan, Puerto Rico

== L ==
La Grange

- Frenštát pod Radhoštěm, Czech Republic

Laredo

- Acámbaro, Mexico
- Campeche, Mexico
- Cerralvo, Mexico
- Chenzhou, China
- Ciénega de Flores, Mexico
- Ciudad Valles, Mexico
- La Cruz, Costa Rica
- Cuernavaca, Mexico
- General Escobedo, Mexico
- General Terán, Mexico
- Guadalajara, Mexico
- Guadalupe, Mexico
- Los Herreras, Mexico
- Hutt, New Zealand
- Jerez, Mexico
- Lampazos de Naranjo, Mexico
- Laredo, Spain
- Lázaro Cárdenas, Mexico
- León, Mexico
- Mexticacán, Mexico
- Monclova, Mexico
- Montemorelos, Mexico
- Murray Bridge, Australia
- Nuevo Laredo, Mexico
- Papantla, Mexico
- San Antonio de Areco, Argentina
- San Miguel de Allende, Mexico
- Tainan, Taiwan
- Tepatitlán de Morelos, Mexico
- Tijuana, Mexico
- Tlahualilo, Mexico
- Tonalá, Mexico
- Torreón, Mexico
- Veracruz, Mexico
- Wenzhou, China
- Wuwei, China
- Zixing, China

== M ==
Marshall

- Taipei, Taiwan

McAllen

- Cadereyta Jiménez, Mexico
- Chilpancingo de los Bravo, Mexico
- Ciudad Victoria, Mexico
- García, Mexico
- Guadalupe, Mexico
- Irapuato, Mexico
- Monterrey, Mexico
- Reynosa, Mexico
- San Luis Potosí, Mexico
- Tampico, Mexico
- Taxco de Alarcón, Mexico
- Zihuatanejo de Azueta, Mexico

Mineral Wells

- Mediaș, Romania

Mission

- Almolonga, Guatemala
- Benito Juárez, Mexico
- Fortín, Mexico
- Isla Mujeres, Mexico
- Puerto Vallarta, Mexico
- Río Bravo, Mexico
- Villa del Carbón, Mexico

== N ==
New Braunfels

- Braunfels, Germany

== P ==
Pasadena

- Hadano, Japan

Plano

- Hsinchu, Taiwan
- San Pedro Garza García, Mexico

Prairie View

- Aseseeso, Ghana
- Guachené, Colombia
- Manta, Colombia
- Pabellón de Arteaga, Mexico
- Punta Gorda, Belize

== R ==
Rio Bravo

- Santiago, Mexico

Rio Grande City

- Celaya, Mexico

Roma

- Cerralvo, Mexico

Round Rock

- Lake Macquarie, Australia
- Sabinas Hidalgo, Mexico

== S ==
San Antonio

- Chennai, India
- Darmstadt, Germany
- Guadalajara, Mexico
- Gwangju, South Korea
- Kumamoto, Japan
- Monterrey, Mexico
- Kaohsiung, Taiwan
- Las Palmas de Gran Canaria, Spain
- Santa Cruz de Tenerife, Spain
- Windhoek, Namibia
- Wuxi, China

San Elizario

- Allende, Mexico
- Casas Grandes, Mexico
- Ciudad Juárez, Mexico
- Doña Ana, United States
- Guerrero, Mexico
- Hidalgo del Parral, Mexico
- Janos, Mexico
- Jiménez, Mexico
- Mesilla, United States
- Santa Bárbara, Mexico
- Satevó, Mexico
- Valle de Zaragoza, Mexico

Seguin

- San Nicolás de los Garza, Mexico

South Padre Island

- San Pedro Garza García, Mexico

Southlake

- Tome, Japan
- Wuzhong (Suzhou), China

== T ==
Temple

- Aguascalientes, Mexico

Tomball

- Telgte, Germany

Tyler

- Lo Barnechea, Chile
- Jelenia Góra, Poland
- Liberia, Costa Rica
- San Miguel de Allende, Mexico
- Yachiyo, Japan

== V ==
Victoria

- Vitoria-Gasteiz, Spain

Von Ormy

- Marín, Mexico

== W ==
West

- Kunovice, Czech Republic

Wichita Falls

- Fürstenfeldbruck, Germany

Williamson County

- Yongin, South Korea
