= Esteros =

Esteros may refer to:

- Esteros (film), 2016 film
- Esteros, Tamaulipas, town in Mexico
- Gertrude Esteros (1914–2016), American college professor
