= Sierra de Picachos =

Mountain range in Nuevo Leon, Mexico

- Location within Mexico

Geography
- Location: Nuevo Leon, Mexico
- Range coordinates: 26°02′N 99°33′W

The Sierra de Picachos is a mountain range located in the state of Nuevo Leon, Mexico. The highest peak in the range reaches an elevation of 4,990 feet (1,521 m) at 26° 03′ 54″ North Latitude and 99° 54′ 56″ West Longitude.

== Geography ==
The Sierra de Picachos is located about 35 miles (55 km) northeast of the city of Monterrey. The Sierra is about 40 miles (55 km) from north to south and 15 miles (25 km) wide. It covers a total area of 542 square miles (1,405 km^{2}). Elevations range from 1,300 feet (400 m) to 4,990 feet (1,521 m). Several peaks reach elevations of more than 4,200 feet (1,300 m). The Sierra is separated from the main ranges of the Sierra Madre Oriental by a mountain pass traversed by Highway 85 which runs from Nuevo Laredo to Monterrey.

Most of the land is cloaked in a semi-desert shrubland (Tamaulipan matorral) made up of woody shrubs, small trees, cacti, and succulents. Above elevations of 2,600 feet (800 m), an oak forest is the dominant vegetation covering 15 percent of the total land in the Picachos. Two species of pines, Arizona Pine and Mexican pine, are found among the oaks. Mammals found in the Picachos include American black bear and Cougar

Due to the prominence of its rocky-topped peaks and its proximity to Monterrey, conservation efforts to preserve the natural environment of the Sierra de Picachos have been extensive. In 2003, the state of Nuevo Leon declared 185,329 acres (75,853 ha) of the Sierra as a Protected Natural Area. Most of the land in the protected area is privately owned but the human impact has been relatively light.

An extensive study of avian life from 1997 to 2000 identified 146 bird species in the Sierra de Picachos.

== Climate ==
The climate of the Sierra is mostly semi-arid, ranging from desert to a more humid environment at higher elevations. Summers are hot; winters are cool by Mexican standards with freezes common. Precipitation is highly variable ranging from about 12 inches (300 mm) to 32 inches (800 mm) annually. Most precipitation is in the summer from May to October. Winters are dry. The climate of Higueras at the foot of the Picachos is typical of the lower elevations in the Sierra.

Climate data for Higueras, Nuevo Leon. Elevation: 1,620 ft (494 m) (1988-2010)
Month	Jan	Feb	Mar	Apr	May	Jun	Jul	Aug	Sep	Oct	Nov	Dec	Year
Record high °C (°F)	35.0 (95.0)	38.5 (101.3)	42.0 (107.6)	43.0 (109.4)	43.0 (109.4)	42.0 (107.6)	40.0 (104.0)	39.0 (102.2)	39.0 (102.2)	36.0 (96.8)	35.0 (95.0)	34.0 (93.2)	43.0 (109.4)
Mean daily maximum °C (°F)	19.7 (67.5)	22.1 (71.8)	26.0 (78.8)	29.6 (85.3)	31.8 (89.2)	32.8 (91.0)	33.2 (91.8)	33.0 (91.4)	30.2 (86.4)	27.0 (80.6)	22.8 (73.0)	18.7 (65.7)	27.2 (81.0)
Daily mean °C (°F)	13.0 (55.4)	14.9 (58.8)	18.7 (65.7)	22.6 (72.7)	25.6 (78.1)	27.1 (80.8)	27.5 (81.5)	27.3 (81.1)	24.8 (76.6)	21.1 (70.0)	16.7 (62.1)	12.6 (54.7)	21.0 (69.8)
Mean daily minimum °C (°F)	6.2 (43.2)	7.7 (45.9)	11.5 (52.7)	15.6 (60.1)	19.4 (66.9)	21.4 (70.5)	21.7 (71.1)	21.6 (70.9)	19.4 (66.9)	15.2 (59.4)	10.5 (50.9)	6.5 (43.7)	14.7 (58.5)
Record low °C (°F)	−5 (23)	−7 (19)	−2 (28)	1 (34)	6 (43)	9 (48)	10 (50)	11 (52)	9 (48)	0 (32)	−2 (28)	−8 (18)	−8 (18)
Average precipitation mm (inches)	27.0 (1.06)	17.0 (0.67)	16.0 (0.63)	21.0 (0.83)	56.0 (2.20)	65.0 (2.56)	71.0 (2.80)	89.0 (3.50)	126.0 (4.96)	42.0 (1.65)	15.0 (0.59)	26.0 (1.02)	571.0 (22.48)
Average precipitation days (≥ 0.1 mm)	5.5	4.6	3.3	3.3	5.3	5.9	5.3	6.9	8.6	5.6	4.4	6.4	65.1
Source: Weatherbase: Higueras, Nuevo Leon

Climatic Classification. Bsh (Koppen) or Bsak (Trewartha). Sub tropical Cw climates are found at higher elevations.
