= Doctor González, Nuevo León =

Doctor González
- Municipality and town
- Location within Nuevo León Location within Mexico
- Coordinates: 25°51′N 99°56′W
- Country: Mexico
- State: Nuevo León
- Municipal seat: Doctor González

Government
  - Federal electoral district: Nuevo León's 14th

Area
  - Total: 701.8 km^{2} (271.0 sq mi)
- Elevation: 360 m (1,180 ft)

Population (2010)
  - Total: 1,988
- Time zone: UTC-6 (Zona Centro)

Doctor González is a municipality and town located in the northeastern Mexican state of Nuevo León. It has a territorial extension of 701.8 km^{2}. The municipal seat has 404 metres above sea level. The municipality is located 48 km northeastwards Monterrey. The municipality was named in honor of José Eleuterio González.

== Geography ==
It borders with the municipalities of Higueras and Cerralvo to north, Pesquería and Los Ramones to south, Cerralvo to west, and Marín to west.

== History ==
The first settlement in what is today the municipality of Doctor González took place in October 21, 1694, founded by Spanish settlers as Hacienda de Ramos, the history of the region where the municipality is now located lies within the Salinas Valley, a historic region in the former New Kingdom of León which extended throughout the Salinas River comprising several municipalities in northern Nuevo León, an important region during the colonization of Nuevo León. The word 'Salinas' designated for the region, was because of the large area characterized by salinity on their lands, useful for livestock and which settled a large number of ranches and farms during the XVII, XVIII and XIX. In 1883 Hacienda de Ramos, was created as a municipality and renamed as Doctor González.
