= Los Ramones =

Human settlement in Mexico

- Municipality
- Location within Nuevo León Location within Mexico
- Country: Mexico
- State: Nuevo León

Government
  - Federal electoral district: Nuevo León's 14th
- Demonym: (in Spanish)
- Time zone: UTC-6 (Zona Centro)

Los Ramones is a municipality and its corresponding seat of government and main population center in the Mexican state of Nuevo León.

== Geography ==
=== Location ===
Los Ramones is located in the west central portion of the Mexican state of Nuevo León. Its coordinates are 25°42′N 99°37′W; it is 226 meters above sea level. It limits with the following municipalities, all in the state of Nuevo Leon: Cerralvo to the North; General Terán to the south; to the East with China, Nuevo Leon and Los Herreras; and to the West with Cadereyta Jiménez, Pesquería and Dr. González. Its total territory covers 1,378.8 square kilometers.

=== Climate ===
The southern portion of the municipality enjoys a temperate climate, with an average annual temperature between 12 and 18 degrees Celsius. The northern part of Los Ramones has an extremely hot, semi-arid climate, with little rainfall.

May and September are the rainiest months in Los Ramones, with an average rainfall of 600 mm. Generally, hail storms appear between February and May and freezing temperatures between November and February. The lowest temperature on record in the municipality was −8 degrees Celsius and the highest 45 degrees Celsius.

== Population ==
According to the 1990 Federal Census, the municipality of Los Ramones had a population of 6,538 inhabitants and a density 5/km².

The same census showed that there were 16 speakers of native languages, representing 0.30% of the total population. The main native language spoken was Huasteco, followed by Náhuatl.

The year 2000 Mexican federal census showed a slight decline in population in the municipality compared to a decade earlier. The 2000 census counted a total population of 6,237, of which 3,134 were male and 3,103 were female.

== Population centers ==
The main population center of the municipality is its seat of government, also named Los Ramones, with a population of approximately 1,300. Los Ramones is located 120 kilometers east of the state capital of Monterrey.

The municipality of Los Ramones contains 102 congregations within its territory, all with less than 500 inhabitants. The villages are: Altamira (Capadero), Amado Gomez, Altamira (El Capadero), Baltazar Rodriguez, Beto Rodriguez, Bonanza, Cancan, Casa Blanca, Cinco De Mayo, Clavelito, Comas Altas, Doña Ana, El Abrevadero, El Alba, El Alto, El Ancon, El Ayuncual, El Carrizo, El Ebanito (El Ebanito Dos), El Ebanito Tres (El Alto), El Ebano, El Esterito, El Faisan, El Gusto, El Huizache, El Mayorazgo, El Molino, El Peine, El Perico, (Rincon Del Valle), El Porvenir (Porvenir Ramones), El Porvenir Guerrero, El Refugio (Los Gonzalez), El Reloj, El Retiro, El Sabanito (Rincon del Valle), El Saucito, El Tuetano, Empalme Ramones, Facundo Gonzalez (El Peine), Fevi, Garza-Ayala (Paso del Macho), Garza-Gonzalez, Guadalupe, Hidalgo, La Amistad, La Arena, La Buena Fe, La Colorada, La Conquista, La Curva (Antigua Avenida), La Ernita, La Estrella, La Gloria, La Morita, La Palma, La Pedrera, La Piedra, La Ponderosa, La Posada, La Reforma, La Salanillas (Herradura), Lagunitas, Las Alazanas, Las Barretas (Barretitas), Las Enramadas, Las Presas, Las Puentes, Loma, Los Abuelos, Los Angeles (Palo Blanco, Las Burras), Los Centenario (Bueyes) Los Chaparros, Los Chaparros Numero Dos, Los Dos Puentes, Los Dos Rios, Los Ebanos, Los Garcia, Los Gomez-Ochoa (Los Gomez), Los Horcones, Los Martinez, Los Olmos, Los Pilares, Los Pobladores (La Calor), Lucio Leal, Maravillas, Maribel, Noe Gonzalez, Noel Ramirez, Nuevo Repueblo de Oriente, Rancho Nuevo (Rancho Nuevo del Sur), San Andres (Los Garza, Las Barranquitas), San Antonio, San Bartolo, San Benito, San Francisco, San Isidro, San Jose, San Lorenzo, Santa Cruz del Valle, Santa Rita, Santo Domingo, Toribio Perez, Valle Alto and Zacahuixtle.

== History ==
Historical references as to the origin and foundation of the municipality which is Los Ramones, indicate that Francisco Plácido Rodríguez Baca was its founder toward the last third of the 18th Century. Rodríguez Baca was a descendant of Captain Diego de Rodríguez, one of the original Spanish settlers of Nuevo Leon.

The current location of the municipality's seat of government is also the location of an original Spanish land grant made to a settler named Alférez José Ochoa de Elejalde.

In 1847, the inhabitants of Los Ramones petitioned the State government to secede from the municipality of Cerralvo, to which it belonged to at the time, and be incorporated into the municipality of Cadereyta Jiménez. The state Congress granted the request and on November 7, 1847 and Los Ramones ceased to belong to Cerralvo and became a dependency of Cadereyta Jiménez. Los Ramones was made a municipality on September 5, 1915.

On October 26, 2010, the city's police force quit after thirty sicarios shot the local police station.
