= Melchor Ocampo, Nuevo León =

Coordinates: 26.0586°N 99.5422°W

Melchor Ocampo
- Municipality
- Location in Mexico Melchor Ocampo (Mexico)
- Country: Mexico
- State: Nuevo León

Government
  - Federal electoral district: Nuevo León's 14th
- Demonym: (in Spanish)
- Time zone: UTC-6 (Zona Centro)

Melchor Ocampo is a municipality located in the Mexican state of Nuevo León. It is named after Don Melchor Ocampo, who was Foreign Minister during the government of Benito Juárez.

== Geography ==
The municipality of Melchor Ocampo is located in the northeastern part of the state. Its coordinates are: 25°03' N and 99°33' W, and it is 145 meters over sea level. It limits with the following municipalities: To the north with General Treviño; to the south with Los Herreras; to the east with Los Aldamas; and to the west with Cerralvo.

=== Climate ===
A semi-arid climate with extreme temperatures in winter and summer. In summer, average daily low temperature is 24 °C and average daily high is 40 °C. June, July and August are the hottest months. Average annual rainfall is 600mm. Wind currents tend to come from the south in summer and the north in winter.

== Population ==
According to the 1990 federal census, the municipality had a population of 1,641 and a density of 7 inhabitants/km^{2}. The census showed 834 males and 807 females in the population. There was 1 native language speaker, representing 0.09% of the total population in the municipality.

The 2000 federal census showed a decline in population, with 1,215 inhabitants, of which 631 were male and 584 female.

== Population Centers ==
The municipality seat of government, also named Melchor Ocampo with a population of 1,100 is the largest. Other population centers include: Sócrates Rizo, La Coma, El Reparo, La Paloma, Loma Blanca, El Orégano.

== History ==
Melchor Ocampo, N.L., was founded by the Spanish settlers Juan de Benavides and Napoleón de García in 1702. They named the foundation “Charco Redondo”.

Melchor Ocampo obtained the category of municipality by state decree on October 20, 1948.
