= Padilla, Tamaulipas =

Former settlement in Tamaulipas, Mexico

Coordinates: 24°02′N 98°54′W

Padilla
- Municipality
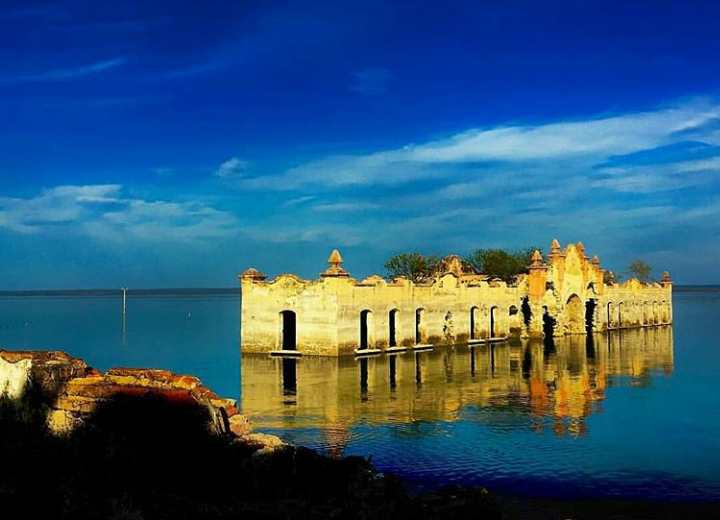

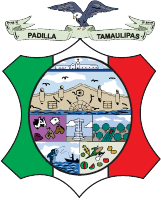
- Coat of arms

- Location in Mexico Padilla (Mexico)
- Country: Mexico
- State: Tamaulipas
- Demonym: (in Spanish)
- Time zone: UTC−6 (CST)

Padilla Municipality is a municipality in the Mexican state of Tamaulipas. After the flood at the Vicente Guerrero Dam in 1970, the seat was moved from Padilla to the town of Nuevo Padilla.

Padilla is known for being the place where the Mexican liberator and Emperor Agustín de Iturbide was executed by a firing squad. It is also the place where Manuel de Mier y Terán, a Mexican general, took his life with a sword. The town was established on 6 January 1749 by José de Escandón, then a Spanish Indian-fighter in New Spain and the founder and first governor of the colony of Nuevo Santander. The town was named after María Padilla, the wife of Juan Francisco de Güemes, the viceroy of New Spain. At the time of its establishment, more than 40 people from Hidalgo, Linares, and Río Blanco resided in the area. As of 2010, the municipality of Padilla has a population of 14,020.

The Federal Electricity Commission (CFE) reported that a blackout that affected 12 states of the country and more than 10 million users on December 28, 2020, was caused by a fire in 30 hectares (74 acres) of grasslands in Padilla. However, the Tamaulipas State Civil Protection Coordination rejected the document presented by the CFE, saying the document was falsified.
