= 14th federal electoral district of Nuevo León =

Federal electoral district of Mexico

Nuevo León's 14th
- Electoral district of the Chamber of Deputies of Mexico

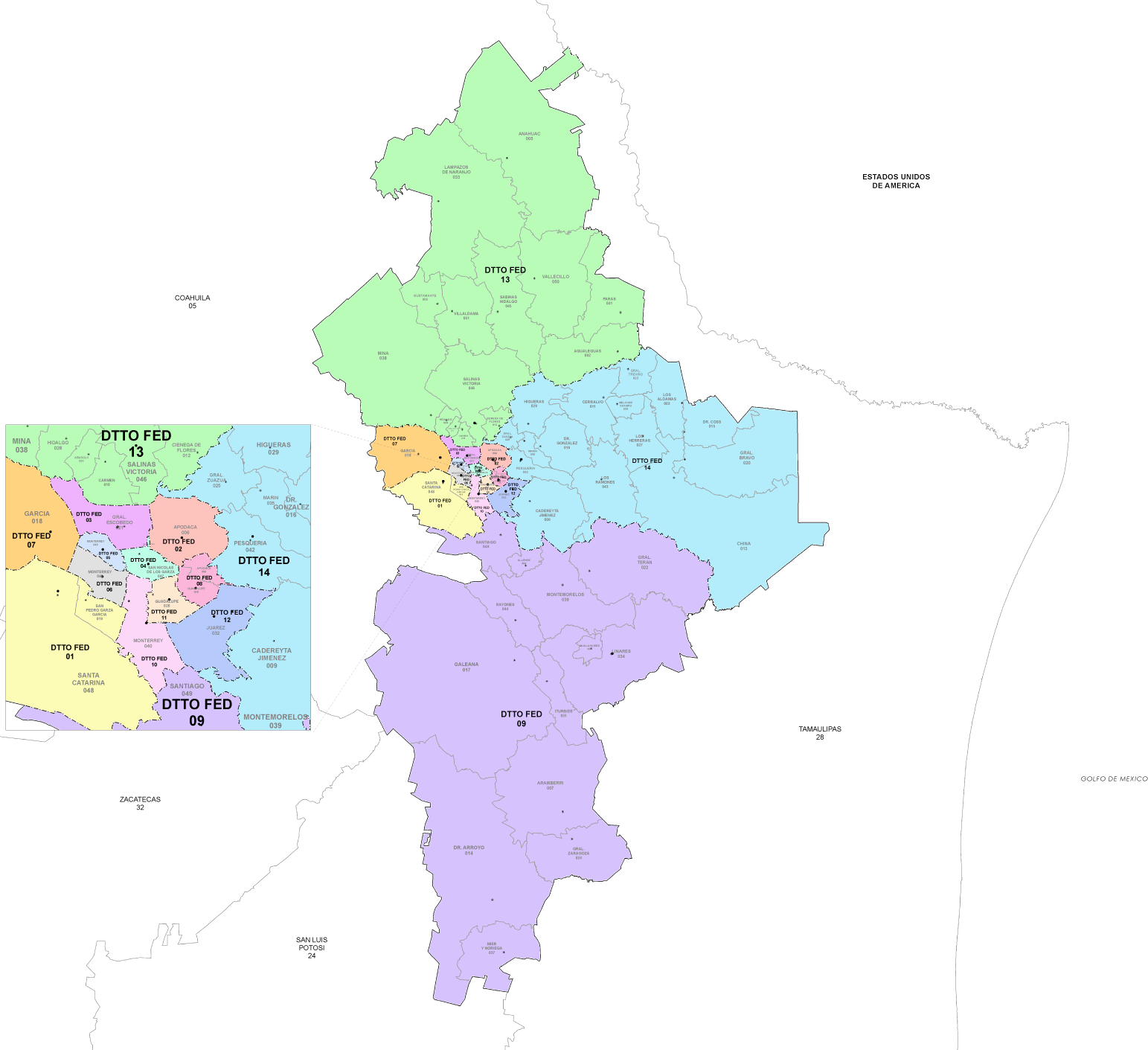
- 14th district

Incumbent
- Member: José Gloria López
- Party: ▌Labour Party
- Congress: 66th (2024–2027)

District
- State: Nuevo León
- Head town: Pesquería
- Coordinates: 25°47′N 100°03′W
- Covers: 15 municipalities: Los Aldamas, Cadereyta Jiménez, Cerralvo, China, Doctor Coss, Doctor González, General Bravo, General Treviño, General Zuazua, Los Herreras, Higueras, Marín, Melchor Ocampo, Pesquería, Los Ramones
- PR region: Second
- Precincts: 210
- Population: 400,627 (2020 census)

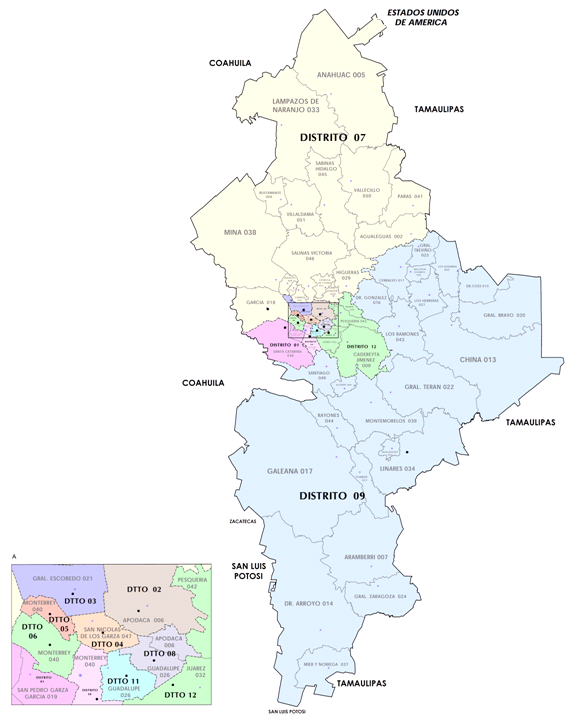
Nuevo León's districts in 2017–2022

The 14th federal electoral district of Nuevo León (Spanish: Distrito electoral federal 14 de Nuevo León) is one of the 300 electoral districts into which Mexico is divided for elections to the federal Chamber of Deputies and one of 14 such districts in the state of Nuevo León.

It elects one deputy to the lower house of Congress for each three-year legislative session by means of the first-past-the-post system. Votes cast in the district also count towards the calculation of proportional representation ("plurinominal") deputies elected from the second region.

The 13th and 14th districts were established by the National Electoral Institute (INE) in its 2021–2023 redistricting process and elected their first deputies in the 2024 general election. The inaugural member for the 14th district is José Gloria López of the Labour Party (PT).

== District territory ==
Evolution of electoral district numbers
	1974	1978	1996	2005	2017	2023
Nuevo León	7	11	11	12	12	14
Chamber of Deputies	196	300				

Under the INE's 2023 districting plan, which is to be used for the 2024, 2027 and 2030 federal elections, the new 14th district covers 210 electoral precincts (secciones electorales) across 15 of the state's eastern municipalities:

- Los Aldamas, Cadereyta Jiménez, Cerralvo, China, Doctor Coss, Doctor González, General Bravo, General Treviño, General Zuazua, Los Herreras, Higueras, Marín, Melchor Ocampo, Pesquería and Los Ramones.

The head town (cabecera distrital), where results from individual polling stations are gathered together and tallied, is the city of Pesquería. The district reported a population of 400,627 in the 2020 census.

== Deputies returned to Congress ==
(Mexico) National parties
- Current
- PAN
- PRI
- PT
- PVEM
- MC
- Morena
- PAZ
- Somos
- Defunct or local only
- PLM
- PNR
- PRM
- PNM
- PP
- PPS
- PARM
- PFCRN
- CON
- PANAL
- PSD
- PES
- PES
- PRD

Nuevo León's 14th district
Election	Deputy	Party	Term	Legislature
2024	José Gloria López	Labour Party (Mexico)	2024–2027	66th Congress

== Presidential elections ==
Nuevo León's 14th district
Election	District won by	Party or coalition	%
2024	Claudia Sheinbaum Pardo	Sigamos Haciendo Historia	59.6485
