= Vicente Guerrero Dam =

- Interactive map of Vicente Guerrero Dam
- Country: Mexico
- Location: Padilla, Tamaulipas
- Coordinates: 23°57′36″N 98°39′58″W
- Purpose: Irrigation
- Opening date: 1971

Dam and spillways
- Elevation at crest: 60 m (200 ft)

Reservoir
- Total capacity: 3.9 km^{3} (0.94 cu mi)

General Vicente Guerrero Dam (Spanish: Presa Vicente Guerrero), also known as Las Adjuntas Dam, is a dam in the Mexican state of Tamaulipas. It was constructed in 1971 for irrigation and public use. It was named for Vicente Guerrero, a revolutionary general of the Mexican War of Independence.
