= San Bernardo, Nuevo León =

Human settlement in Nuevo León, Mexico

Coordinates: 25°38′N 98°56′W

San Bernardo is a village in the municipality of China, Nuevo León, Mexico.
