= Nuevo Padilla, Tamaulipas =

Coordinates: 24°01′N 98°47′W

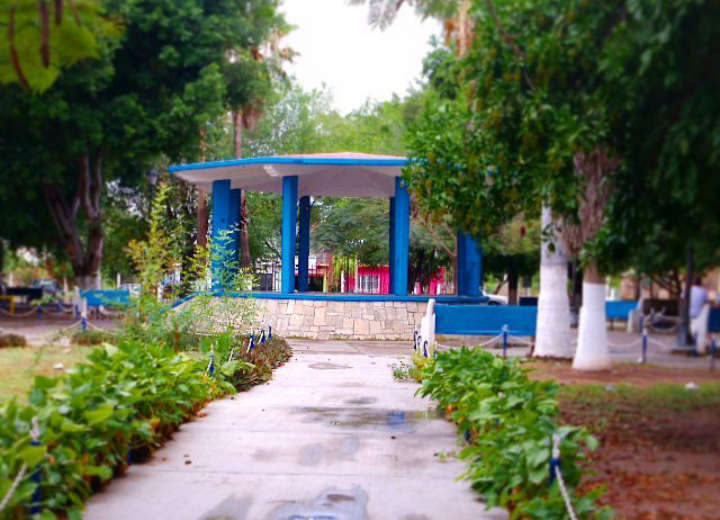
Nuevo Padilla, Tamaulipas

Do not confuse with Padilla, Tamaulipas, the former city and current municipality.

Nuevo Padilla, Tamaulipas is a Mexican town in the state of Tamaulipas and the seat of the municipality of Padilla. It was established in 1970 after the flood of the town of Padilla, Tamaulipas, the place where the historical figures of Agustín de Iturbide and Manuel de Mier y Terán died.
