= Hvozdná =

- Municipality
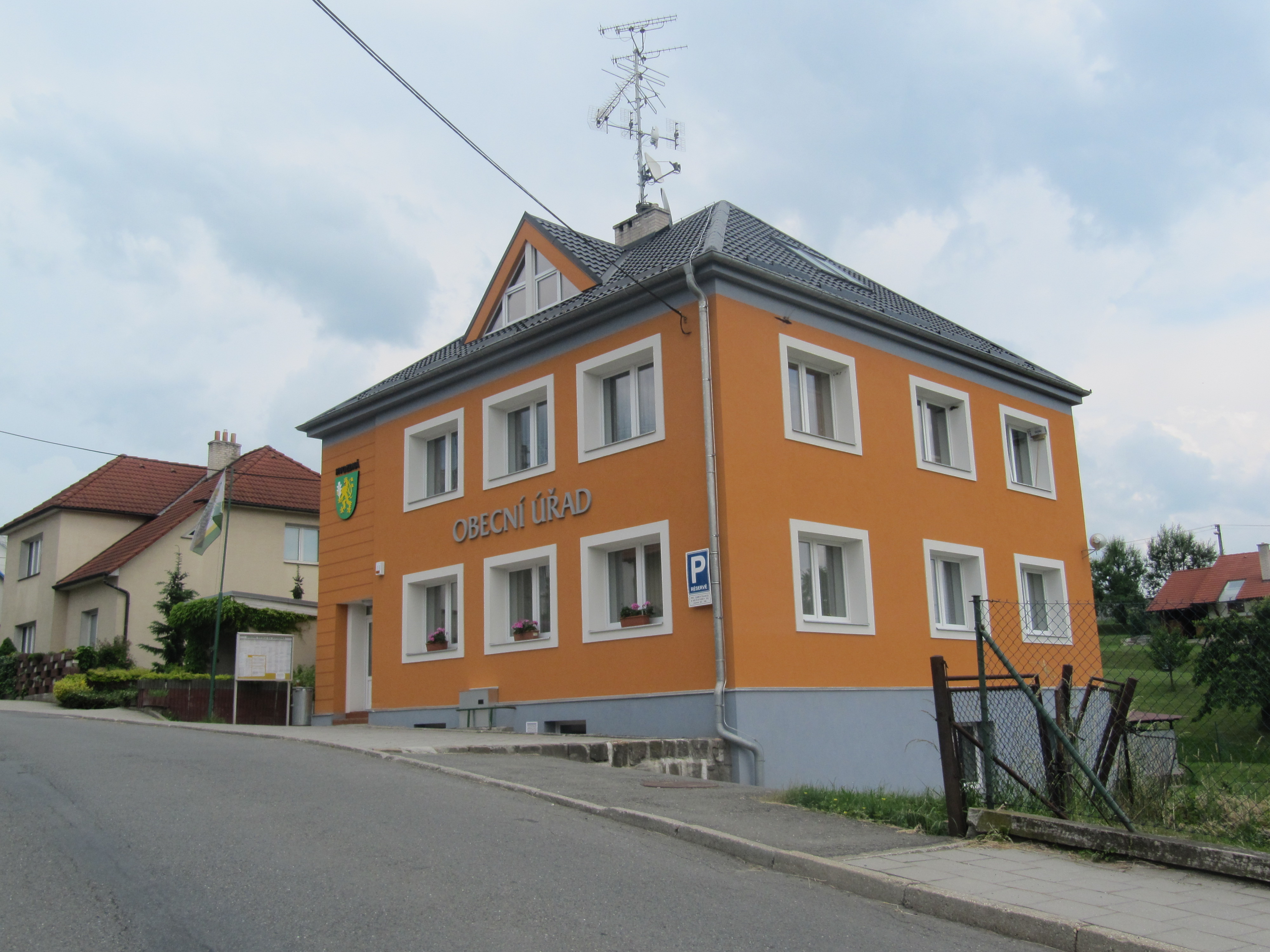
- Municipal office

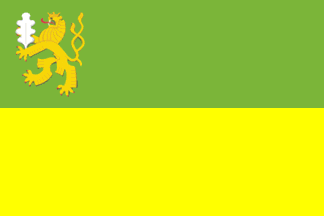
- Flag Coat of arms

- Location in the Czech Republic
- Coordinates: 49°14′55″N 17°45′6″E
- Country: Czech Republic
- Region: Zlín
- District: Zlín
- First mentioned: 1446

Area
  - Total: 7.28 km^{2} (2.81 sq mi)
- Elevation: 302 m (991 ft)

Population (2026-01-01)
  - Total: 1,302
  - Density: 179/km^{2} (463/sq mi)
- Time zone: UTC+1 (CET)
  - Summer (DST): UTC+2 (CEST)
- Postal code: 763 10
- Website: www.hvozdna.cz

Hvozdná is a municipality and village in Zlín District in the Zlín Region of the Czech Republic. It has about 1,300 inhabitants.

Hvozdná lies approximately 7 kilometres (4 mi) east of Zlín and 258 km (160 mi) east of Prague.

== History ==
The first written mention of Hvozdná is from 1446. Some data indicate the existence of the settlement as early as 1425.

== Demographics ==
Historical population
Year	Pop.	±%
1869	671	—
1880	779	+16.1%
1890	767	−1.5%
1900	800	+4.3%
1910	864	+8.0%
1921	857	−0.8%
1930	931	+8.6%
1950	1,055	+13.3%
1961	1,182	+12.0%
1970	1,108	−6.3%
1980	1,024	−7.6%
1991	946	−7.6%
2001	988	+4.4%
2011	1,187	+20.1%
2021	1,299	+9.4%
Source: Censuses

== Twin towns – sister cities ==
Hvozdná is twinned with:

- East Bernard, United States
