= Los Aldamas =

Municipality of Nuevo León, Mexico

- Municipality
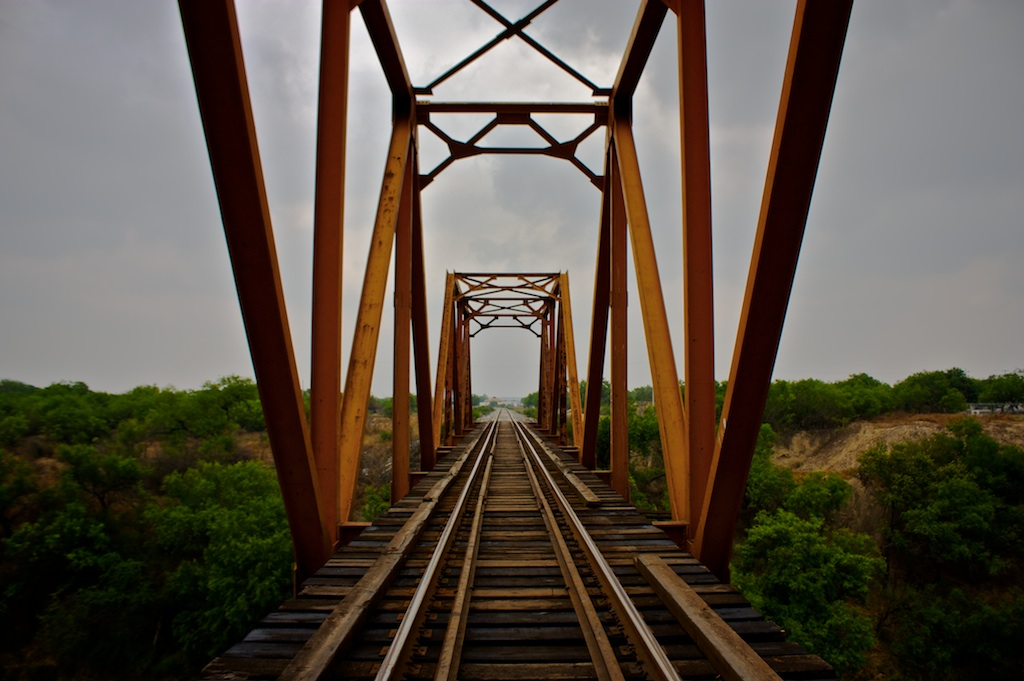
- Los Aldamas railway track

- Location within Nuevo León Location within Mexico
- Coordinates: 26°03′50″N 99°11′45″W
- Country: Mexico
- State: Nuevo León

Government
  - Type: Municipality
  - Mayor: Janett Leal Leal (PAN)
  - Federal electoral district: Nuevo León's 14th

Population (2020 census)
  - Total: 1,407
- Time zone: UTC-6 (Zona Centro)

Los Aldamas is a municipality located northeast of the Mexican state of Nuevo León. Its geographic coordinates are 26°03′N 99°11′W. It is bordered to the north by the state of Tamaulipas, to the south by the municipalities of Doctor Coss and China, to the east by the municipality of Dr. Coss, N.L and the state of Tamaulipas, and the west by the municipalities of General Treviño, Melchor Ocampo and Los Herreras, N.L.

== History ==
Franciscan priests founded the town in 1760 using the name of Guadalupe Mission, in an area then known as Puerto de Hoyos, which was a watering hole for cattle on the west bank of the San Juan River.

On Christmas Eve 1825, the Congress of the newly created State of Nuevo León, decreed the foundation of a new township to be located at Puerto de Los Hoyos with the name of Villa de Santa María de Aldama. In 1829, the name was changed to Villa de Santa María de Los Aldamas, the additional "s" to avoid confusion with Villa de Aldama, also located in Nuevo León. The name was in honor of brothers Juan Aldama and Ignacio Aldama, heroes of the Mexican War of Independence.

During the Mexican Revolution, the municipality served as the temporary capital of the state from February to May 1914.
