= Doctor Coss, Nuevo León =

Doctor Coss
- Municipality
- Location in Mexico Doctor Coss (Mexico)
- Country: Mexico
- State: Nuevo León

Government
  - Federal electoral district: Nuevo León's 14th
- Demonym: (in Spanish)
- Time zone: UTC−6 (Zona Centro)

Doctor Coss is both a city and a municipality in Nuevo León, Mexico. It is located at 25°56′N 99°10′W, 182 km NE of Monterrey. Its name honors Dr. José María Coss, a liberal politician of the 19th century. In 2000 the municipality had 2246 inhabitants, while the homonym city (which serves as the municipal seat) had some 1,000.

== History ==
The first settlement, Paso del Zacate, was formed around 1745 with families from Los Aldamas, Nuevo León and General Bravo. Almost a century later Paso del Zacate was declared a villa by the state congress and finally, on October 7, 1882, the municipality of Doctor Coss was formed with the unification of Paso del Zacate, Zacate, Soledad, El Ebanito, La Lajilla, Los Chorros, Tecomate, Lucero, Las Mujeres and Gachupines.

== Geography ==
The municipality has an area of 664.6 km^{2} and is bordered by the state of Tamaulipas to the north, General Bravo to the east and Los Aldama and China to the west. It is located 134 meters above sea level (which makes it the highest municipality in the state) and is crossed by the San Juan river.

== Education ==
Doctor Coss has 4 kindergartens, 14 elementary schools and one secondary school.

== List of mayors in Dr. Coss ==
Municipal President	Year(s) in office
Martín González Peña	1939–1940
Luis Gonzaga Cantu Salinas	1941–1942
Gumersindo Ríos Salinas	1943–1945
Ramón Hinojosa Martínez	1946–1948
Asencio Martínez Trigo	1949–1951
Zaragoza Ríos García	1952–1954
Arnulfo Madrigal Serna	1955–1957
David Peña Cantú	1957 -
Domingo Pérez Alanís	1958–1960
Fidel Ríos Cantú	1961–1963
Leandro Salinas Peña	1964–1966
Severiano Ríos Cantú	1967–1971
Pedro Salinas Treviño	1970–1971
Sixto Gutiérrez Ríos	1972–1973
Juan Salinas Cantú	1974–1976
Rodolfo Hinojosa Tijerina	1977–1979
Simón Ríos Balderas	1980–1982
Matías Leal Ríos	1983–1985
René Salinas Alanís	1986–1988
Simón Ríos Balderas	1989–1991
María Elva Salinas de Hinojosa	1992–1994
Guadalupe García Hinojosa	1994–1997
Delia Rangel Ríos	1997–2000
Jorge Alberto Cantú Cantú (El Queso - El Cheese)	2000–2003
Homero Alanis Salinas	2003–2006
Simón Ríos Rangel	2006–2009
Miguel Angel Salinas González	2009-2012
Simón Ríos Rangel	2015-2018
Simón Ríos Rangel	2018-2021
