= Cadereyta Jiménez =

- City and municipality
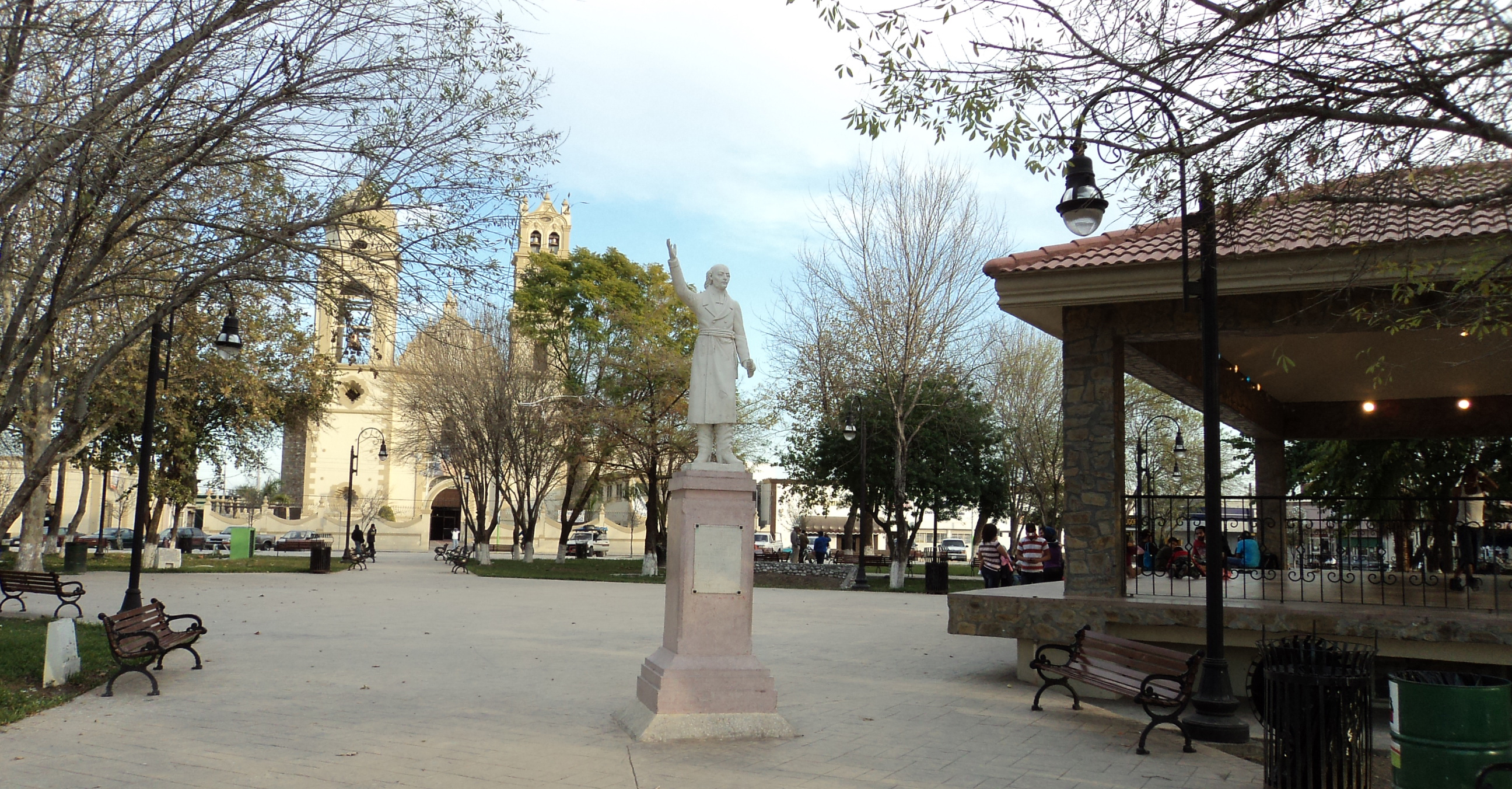
- Statue of Miguel Hidalgo

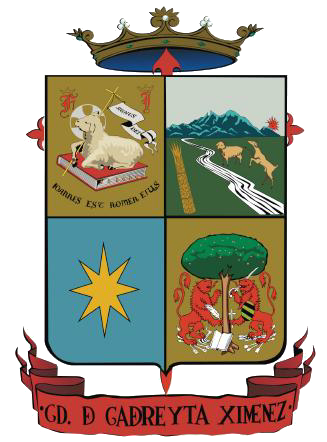
- Coat of arms
- Nickname: Cadereyta
- Location within Nuevo León Location within Mexico
- Coordinates: 25°36′N 100°00′W
- Country: Mexico
- State: Nuevo León
- Founded: August 13, 1637
- Named for: Lope Díez de Armendáriz, 1st Marquess of Cadreita and José Mariano Jiménez

Government
  - Mayor: Carlos Rodríguez "El cuate” (MC)
  - Federal electoral district: Nuevo León's 14th

Area
  - City: 36.16 km^{2} (13.96 sq mi)
  - Municipality: 1,141 km^{2} (441 sq mi)
- Elevation: 360 m (1,180 ft)

Population (2020 census)
  - City: 75,721
  - Density: 2,094/km^{2} (5,424/sq mi)
  - Metro: 5,341,177
  - Municipality: 122,337
  - Municipality density: 107.2/km^{2} (277.7/sq mi)
- Time zone: UTC-6 (Zona Centro)
- Website: http://www.cadereyta.gob.mx

Cadereyta Jiménez is the name of a city as well as of a municipality in the Mexican state of Nuevo León.

The municipality of Cadereyta Jiménez is located in the central part of the state, 360 meters above sea level, at 25' 36" N latitude and 100' 00" W longitude. The municipality has a territorial extension of 1,141 km^{2} (441 sq mi). It borders the following municipalities, all of which are in the state of Nuevo León: to the north, Juárez and Pesquería; to the south, Allende, Montemorelos and General Terán; to the east, General Terán and Los Ramones; to the west, Juárez and Santiago. It is the most easterly municipality of the Monterrey metropolitan area.

The city of Cadereyta Jiménez, which is the seat of the municipality and its main population center had a 2005 census population of 56,552, the ninth-largest city in the state. However, within the municipality there are numerous other villages, the largest of which are: San Juan, Ejido Palmitos, La Calzada, El Alamito, Pueblo Nuevo, Cereso Cadereyta, Atongo de Abajo and Palmitos. The municipality had an official population of 73,746, also the ninth-largest in the state.

== Foundation ==
In 1692, after a great flood, the town was relocated to the left side of the Santa Catarina river, 4.5 kilometers from its original location. In 1762, authorities and residents requested permission from Gubernator Carlos de Velasco to move back to the right side of the river, as they were going through a decade-long drought, and the terrain made it difficult for them to move water from the river to the inhabited area. This move to the new site occurred in February 1763. On March 28, 1825, the State Congress, at the request of Gubernator Antonio Rodriguez Leal, recategorized the community as a city and renamed it Cadereyta Jimenez. Its original name honored the sixteenth viceroy of New Spain, Lope Díez de Armendáriz, 1st Marquess of Cadreita, and General José Mariano Jiménez, precursor of the Independence of Nuevo Reino de Leon. Since 1638, the jurisdiction of the village San Juan Bautista de Cadereyta; Gubernator Zavala mark it from the west part until Tampico port. This enormous territory lasted until 1742, when the colony of Nuevo Santander (Tamaulipas) was founded. This colony was largely inhabited by people from Cadereyta.

== Chronology ==
- 1637: Foundation of the Village of Cadereyta, August 13.
- 1638: On a visit to the Village of Cadereyta, then Governor Zavala grants it territorial jurisdiction as far east as the port of Tampico. On February 25, the Governor orders his clerk to redact the certificate of foundation, and this document disappears from municipal records. Years later the certificate was found outside of the country by the historian Angel Mario Rocha Leal, who succeeded in saving it and reintegrating it to historical patrimony in 1996.
- 1692: The Village of Cadereyta is relocated to the left bank of the Santa Catarina River.
- 1762: Owing to a ravaging drought lasting since 1755 and the rough terrain and lack of water for human and animal consumption, authorities and residents requested permission from the Gubernator to move to the right side of river.
- 1763: In February, an exodus of the population begins to the present location of the city.
- 1825: May 28, the State Congress confers the category of city to the Village of Cadereyta.
- 1889: Construction began on the south tower of the Church San Juan Bautista, built to house a public clock bought by the town in 1872.
- 1892: Don Eugenio Serrano García installs in the city the first broom factory, called “La Aldeana”.
- 1917: An epidemic of Spanish fever strikes the city killing 250 people.
- 1945: Cadereyta City is known as the Broom Capital of Mexico.
- 1973: Construction of the Pemex refinery “Ing. Héctor R. Lara Sosa”, the biggest of Latin America, begins.
- 2005: On the night of October 13 to 14, a waterspout creates severe flooding in the city, leaving the greater part of the downtown under water, 1500 families affected and infrastructure damaged. The flooding also affects the municipalities Allende, Apodaca, Ciénega de Flores, Guadalupe, Benito Juárez, Montemorelos, Pesquería, San Nicolás de los Garza, San Pedro Garza García, Santa Catarina, Santiago y Marín.
- 2012: The Cadereyta Jiménez massacre occurred on the Mexican Federal Highway 40 on 13 May 2012. Mexican officials stated that 49 people were decapitated and mutilated by members of Los Zetas drug cartel and dumped by a roadside near the city of Monterrey in northern Mexico. The actual death toll may be more than 68 people. The bodies were found in the town of San Juan in the municipality of Cadereyta Jiménez, Nuevo León, at about 4 am on a non-toll highway leading to Reynosa, Tamaulipas.

== Government ==
José Santiago Preciado of the Partido Acción Nacional is currently the municipal president (executive or mayor).

== Notable people ==
- Alonso de León (1639–1691), explorer
- Agapito García Dávila (1812–1890), Governor of Nuevo León
- Jerónimo Treviño (1835–1914), Governor of Nuevo León and General
- José María Mier (1847–1914), lawyer, soldier, Governor of Nuevo León and later Jalisco
- María Luisa Garza (1887–1981), writer, poet
- Federico Cantú Garza (1907–1989), painter, muralist
- José Guadalupe Galván Galindo (b. 1941), Bishop Emeritus of Torreón, Coahuila

== Sister city ==
Cadereyta Jiménez has one sister city.:

- (United States) - McAllen, Texas, USA

== Tourism ==
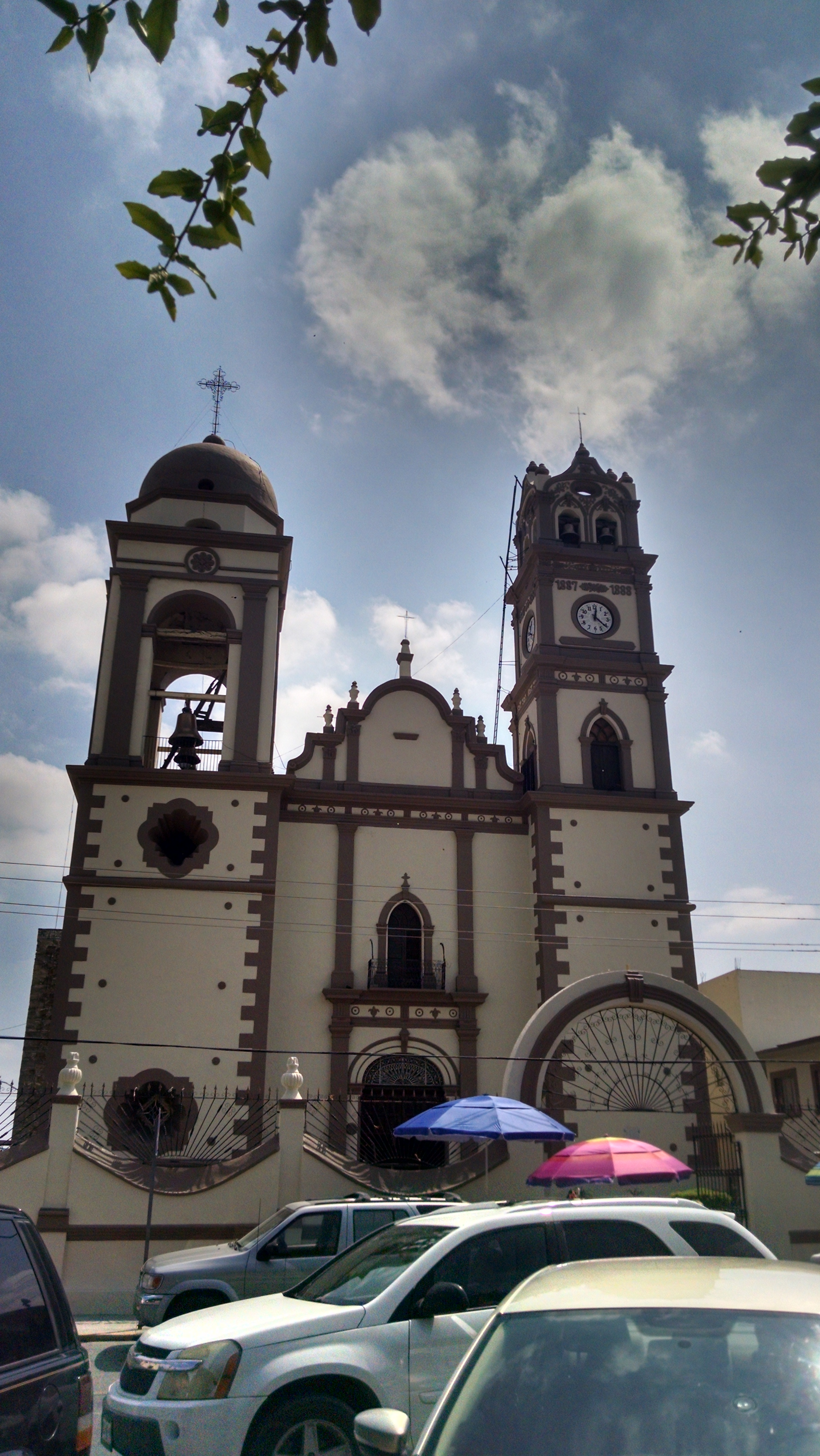
San Juan Bautista Church.

The Church of San Juan Bautista (Saint John Baptist) was completed in 1788; it is in the Spanish Sevillan style.

On April 5, 1998, the grottos “El Mezcal” were accidentally discovered by Pablo Carrizales Gomes and Rodrigo Gomez, who initially discovered a grotto with a depth of 20 to 30 meters and a radius of 200 meters. Later Rodrigo Gomez and Mario Hidalgo de Leon discovered a second grotto, approximately 50 meters in ground, of sufficient size that one can walk around freely. Within the grottos there are formations of stalagmites and stalactites.
