= Cerralvo Municipality =

Cerralvo
- Municipality
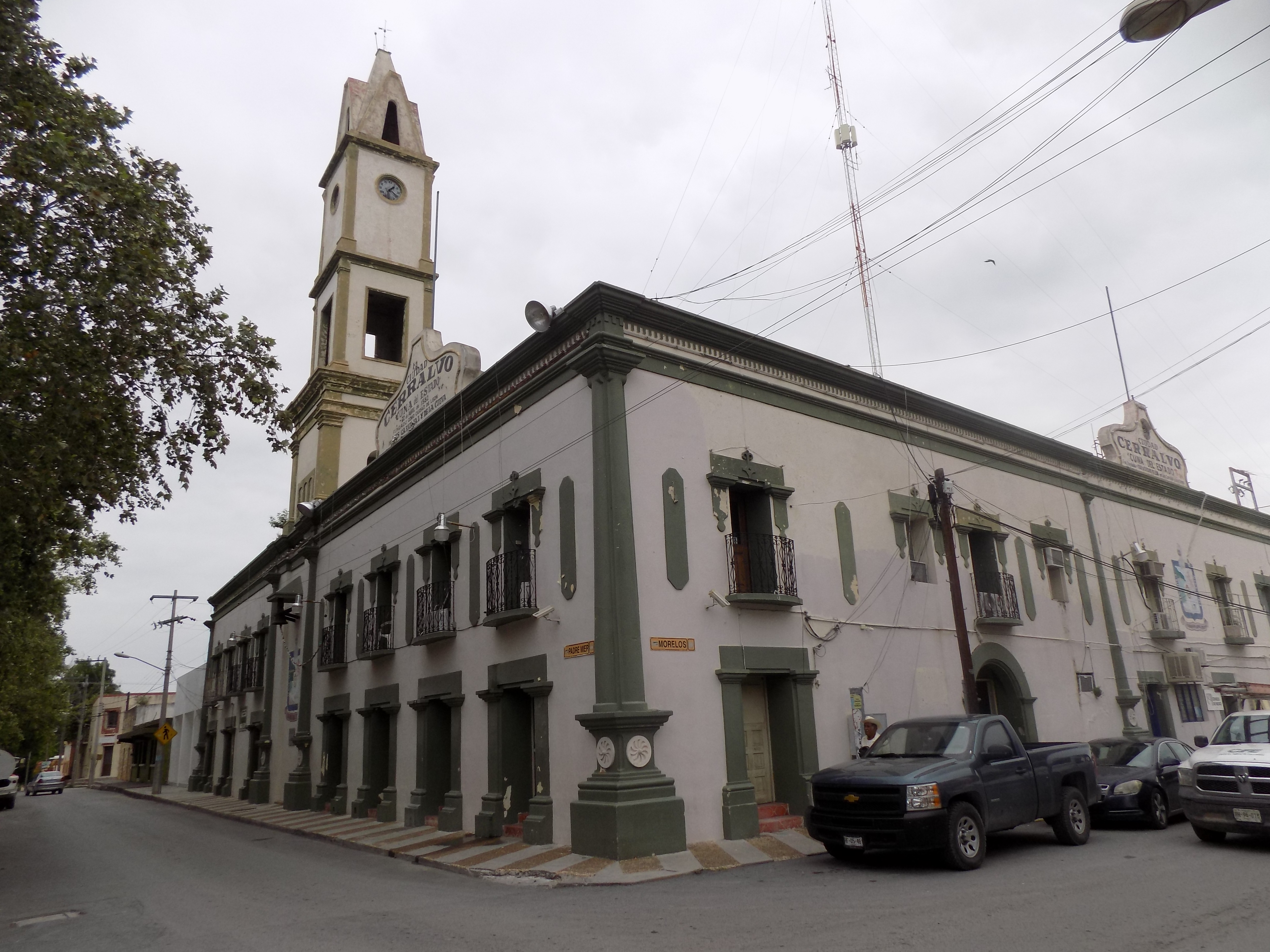
- Municipal Palace

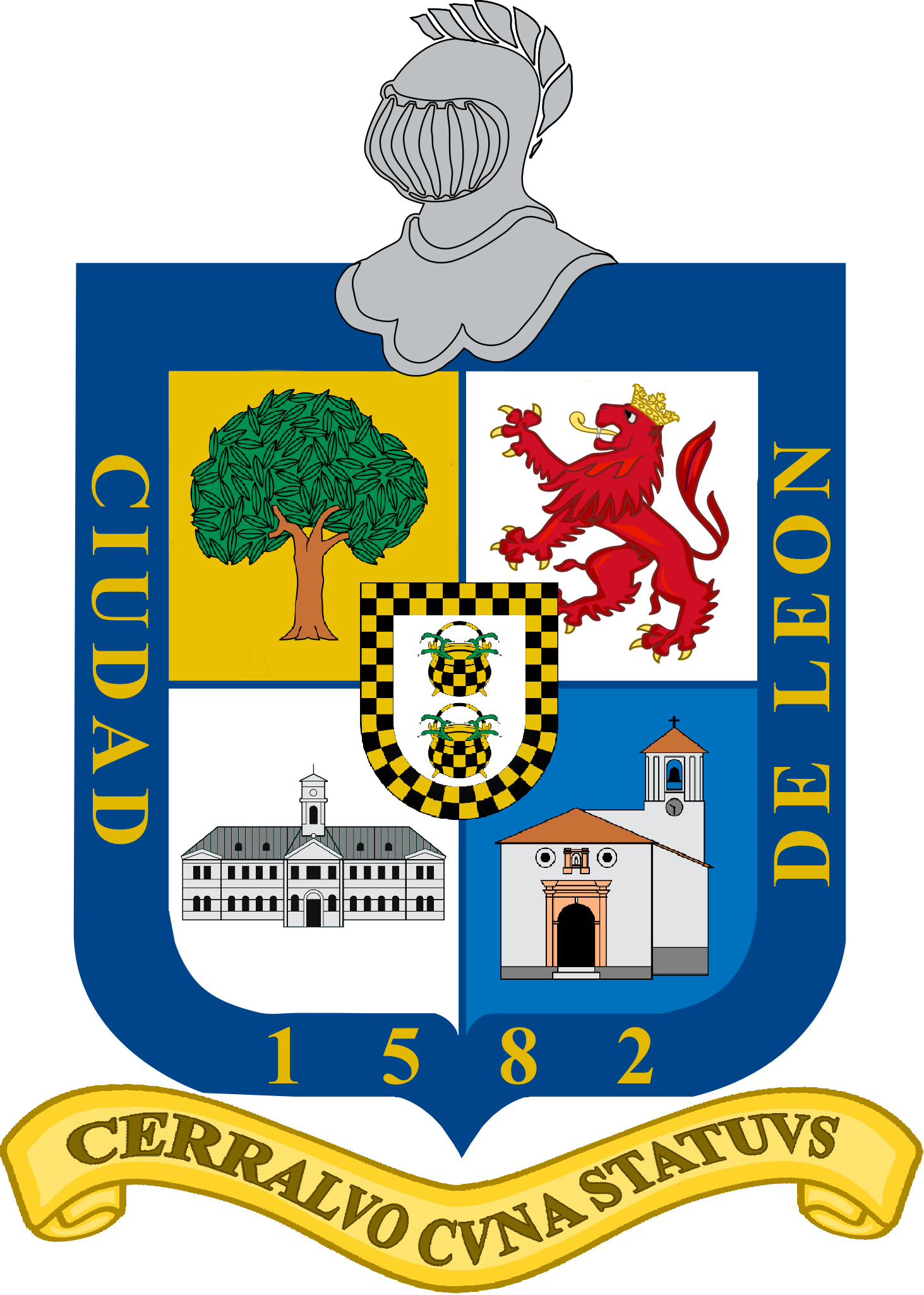
- Coat of arms

- Location within Nuevo León Location within Mexico
- Coordinates: 26°5′N 99°36′W
- Country: Mexico
- State: Nuevo León
- Municipal seat: Ciudad Cerralvo

Government
  - Federal electoral district: Nuevo León's 14th

Area
  - Total: 925.1 km^{2} (357.2 sq mi)

Population (2020)
  - Total: 7,340
  - Density: 7.93/km^{2} (20.5/sq mi)
- Time zone: UTC-6 (Zona Centro)
- Website: (in Spanish) cerralvo.gob.mx

Cerralvo, sometimes known as Ceralvo, is a municipality situated in the Mexican state of Nuevo León. Cerralvo is located in the northeastern region of Nuevo León, in the Gulf Coastal Plain and in the northeastern agricultural and ranching economic zone that also includes the municipalities of Agualeguas, General Treviño, Melchor Ocampo, and Parás. It borders the municipality of Agualeguas to the north, the municipality of Higueras to the west, the municipality of Doctor González to the southwest, the municipality of Los Ramones to the south, and the municipalities of Los Herreras, Melchor Ocampo, and General Treviño to the east.

The municipal seat of Cerralvo, Ciudad Cerralvo, is located at 26° 5' N, 99° 36' W, and is 345 meters above sea level.

== History ==
In 1577, José Luis Carvajal y de la Cueva founded the village of Saltillo; in the same year, he also founded Santa Lucía, now called Monterrey, and discovered the mines of San Gregorio, located in what is now called Cerralvo. On May 31, 1579, Luis Carvajal signed an agreement with King Philip II of Spain to pacify the region and to establish the state of Nuevo León; the contract authorized him to do this in an area that did not exceed 200 leagues on a side.

The first Spanish settlement in Nuevo León took place in 1582 in Cerralvo, which thus included the first capital of the state. In 1630, this settlement was renamed Villa de San Gregorio de Cerralvo, after the fifteenth Viceroy of New Spain, Rodrigo Pacheco y Osorio, marqués de Cerralvo.

The municipality was settled in order to exploit mineral resources, including lead, and to sell Indians to the Spanish.

Cerralvo is home to the national park El Sabinal, which, with an area of 8 hectares, is the smallest national park in Mexico.

== Timeline ==
- 1577—José Luis Carvajal y de la Cueva discovers the mines of San Gregorio (Cerralvo).
- 1582—First Spanish settlement in Nuevo León is founded in Cerralvo.
- 1630—Settlement receives the name of Villa de San Gregorio de Cerralvo.
- 1949—Gruma is founded as Molinos Azteca, SA, in Cerralvo.
