= Esteros, Tamaulipas =

Esteros
- Interactive map of Esteros
- Coordinates: 22°31′10″N 98°07′36″W
- Elevation: 30 m (98 ft)

Population (2005)
  - Total: 2,132
- Time zone: UTC-6 (CST)
  - Summer (DST): UTC-5 (CST)
- Zip Code: 89620
- Area code: +52-833

Esteros is a small town in the Altamira Municipality in Tamaulipas, Mexico. According to the 2005 INGI population estimate it had a population of 2,132. Esteros is located at 22°31′10″N 98°07′36″W (22.5201686, -98.1271362).
