= Marín, Nuevo León =

Marín
- Municipality
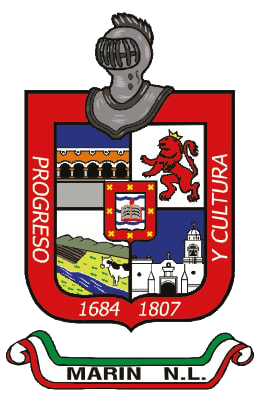
- Coat of arms
- Motto: Progreso y Cultura
- Location within Nuevo León Location within Mexico
- Coordinates: 25°53′N 100°02′W
- Country: Mexico
- State: Nuevo León
- Founded: 1684
- Elevation to city: 1807

Government
  - Type: Municipality
  - Mayor: Juan Carlos Rosales Herrera (PVEM)
  - Federal electoral district: Nuevo León's 14th

Area
  - Total: 129 km^{2} (50 sq mi)
- Elevation: 393 m (1,289 ft)

Population (2020 census)
  - Total: 5,119 (municipality)
- Time zone: UTC-6 (Zona Centro)

Marín is a town and municipality located in the Mexican state of Nuevo León. the municipality was named in honor of Dr. Primo Feliciano Marin de Porras, Bishop of Linares. It has an area of 129 square kilometres (50 sq mi) territorial.

== Geography ==
The town of Marín is located in northeastern Nuevo León, at a latitude of 25 ° 23 'west longitude of Greenwich Mean 100 ° 02'. It lies at an altitude of 393 meters (1,289 ft) above sea level. It has an area of 129 square kilometres (50 sq mi). Weather is extreme, with rainfall in August and September, with annual rainfall ranging between 700 and 1,200 mm (28 and 47 in). July and August are the hottest months.

== History ==
The earliest inhabitants of the area were Native Indians, notably the Aiguales band of Coahuilteco Indians. These indigenous groups were hunters and gatherers, who probably already knew the practice of sowing corn during the planting season. After the harvest they remained living in the region, as is evidenced by the arrowheads, axes and scraper that have been found around the Loma Larga and at sites near rivers. The Spanish arrived in the mid-sixteenth century. Captain Jose Martínez Flores, a native of Saltillo founded the Hacienda San Antonio de los Martinez in 1684. By 1804 the hacienda's treasury had grown considerably. This led to Joaquin Martinez, his relatives and neighbors to request from the political and ecclesiastical authorities to elevate the hacienda to the status of town (villa). The request was granted on July 16, 1807, under the name Villa de San Carlos de Marin, in honor of King Carlos IV of Spain and Bishop Primo Feliciano Marin de Porras of Linares. During the Mexican–American War, Marin was completely destroyed by the invading American army under General Zachary Taylor. The town was rebuilt and, in 1863, the neighboring town of General Zuazua was carved out of Marin.

== Sister city ==
- Von Ormy, Texas, USA
