= General Bravo, Nuevo León =

General Bravo
- Municipality
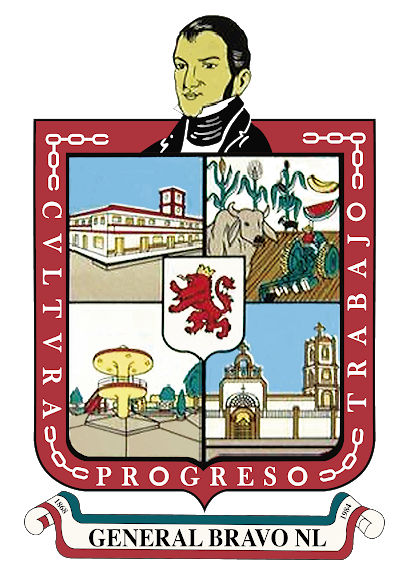
- Coat of arms

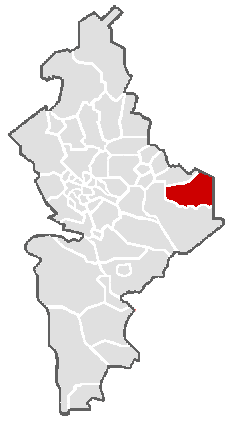
- Coordinates: 25°48′N 99°10′W
- Country: Mexico
- State: Nuevo León

Government
  - Mayor: Patricia Frinee Cantú Garza (PAN)
  - Federal electoral district: Nuevo León's 14th

Area
  - Total: 2,073.2 km^{2} (800.5 sq mi)

Population (2020 census)
  - Total: 5,506
- Time zone: UTC-6 (Zona Centro)

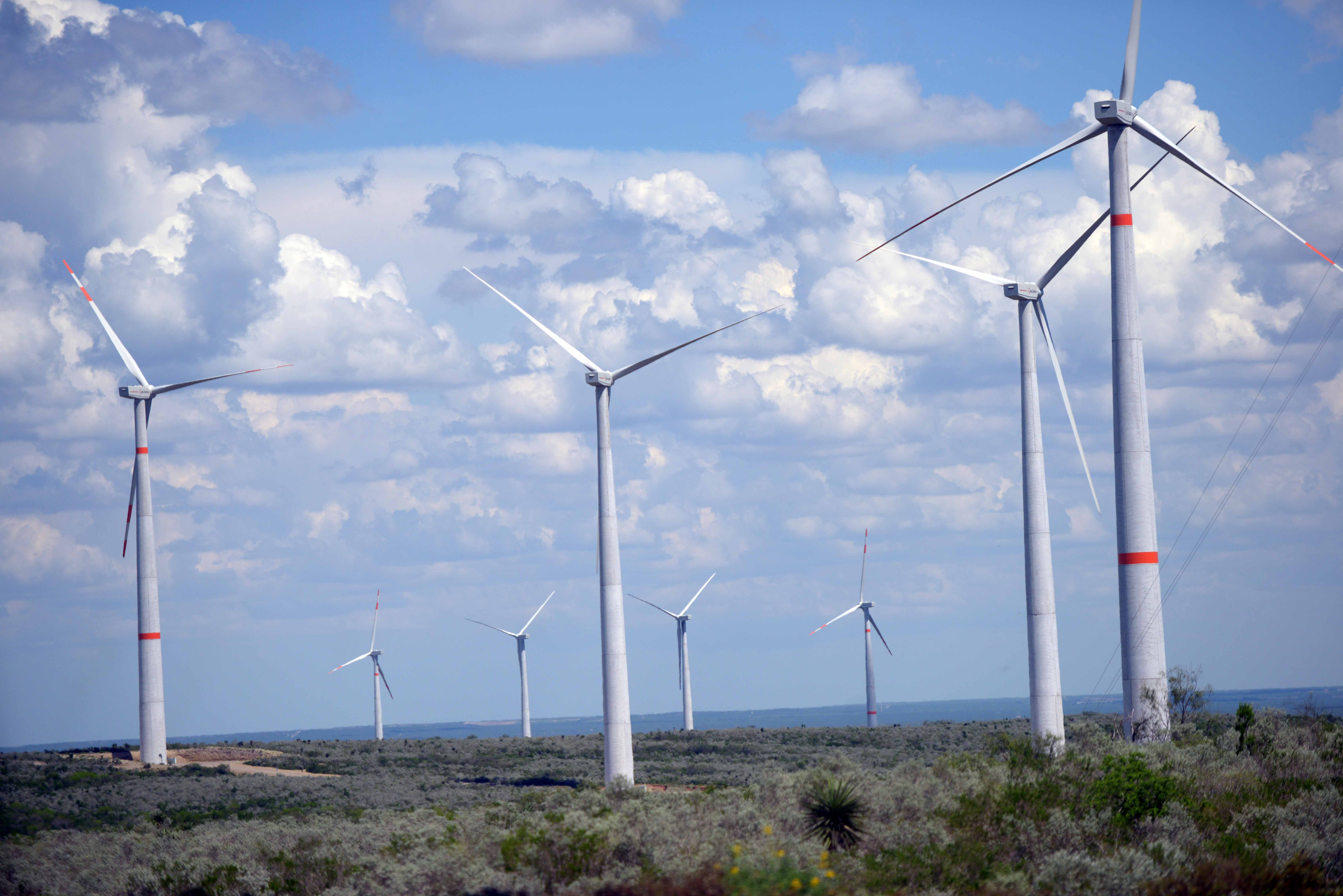
Wind turbines (84 in total) at the Parques Eólicos Ventika (Ventika I and Ventika II) located in General Bravo, Nuevo León.

General Bravo is a municipality located in the state of Nuevo León in northeastern Mexico.

It is also the name of its municipal seat of government and main center of population.

== History ==
General Bravo municipality and town is named after Nicolás Bravo, a hero of the Mexican War of Independence.

It was founded on November 18, 1868.
