= Higueras, Nuevo León =

Coordinates: 25°58′N 100°01′W

Higueras
- Municipality
- Interactive map of Higueras

Government
  - Mayor: Rafael González (PAN)
  - Federal electoral district: Nuevo León's 14th

Population (2020 census)
  - Total: 1,386
- Time zone: UTC-6 (Zona Centro)
- Website: higuerasnuevoleon.gob.mx

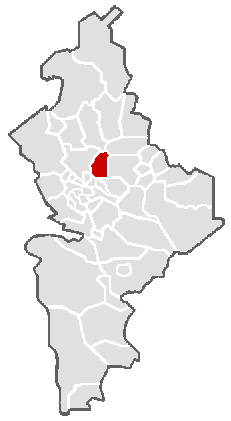
Location of Higueras within the state.

Higueras is a municipality in Nuevo León, Mexico. It has an area of 600.2 square kilometers. It is bordered on the north by Sabinas Hidalgo and Salinas Victoria, on the south by Doctor González y Marín, to the east by Agualeguas and Cerralvo, and to the west by General Zuazua and Cienega de Flores.

== History ==
In 1709, Luis Monterde y Antillón acquired the land for raising cattle. In 1714 the area was purchased by captain Diego de González. Thenceforth the area was known as Hacienda de Santa Teresa de las Higueras.

Diego de González died in 1728 and years his son-in-law, captain José Salvador Lozano, married Doña María Teresa González, and went on to construct the first chapel. The construction of a church was completed in 1854.

On February 18, 1865, the number of inhabitants reached 1000, and the title of town (villa) was consequently granted by the then-governor of Nuevo León, Santiago Vidaurri.

The first female mayor in Nuevo León, Orfelinda Villarreal, took office there in 1957.
