= General Treviño =

Municipality in northern Mexico

- Municipality
- Interactive map of General Treviño
- Location within Nuevo León Location within Mexico
- Coordinates: 26°13′21″N 99°29′06″W
- Country: Mexico
- State: Nuevo León

Government
  - Type: Municipality
  - Mayor: Maribel Hinojosa García (PAN)
  - Federal electoral district: Nuevo León's 14th

Population (2020 census)
  - Total: 1,808
- Time zone: UTC-6 (Zona Centro)

General Treviño is a municipality in the Mexican state of Nuevo León.

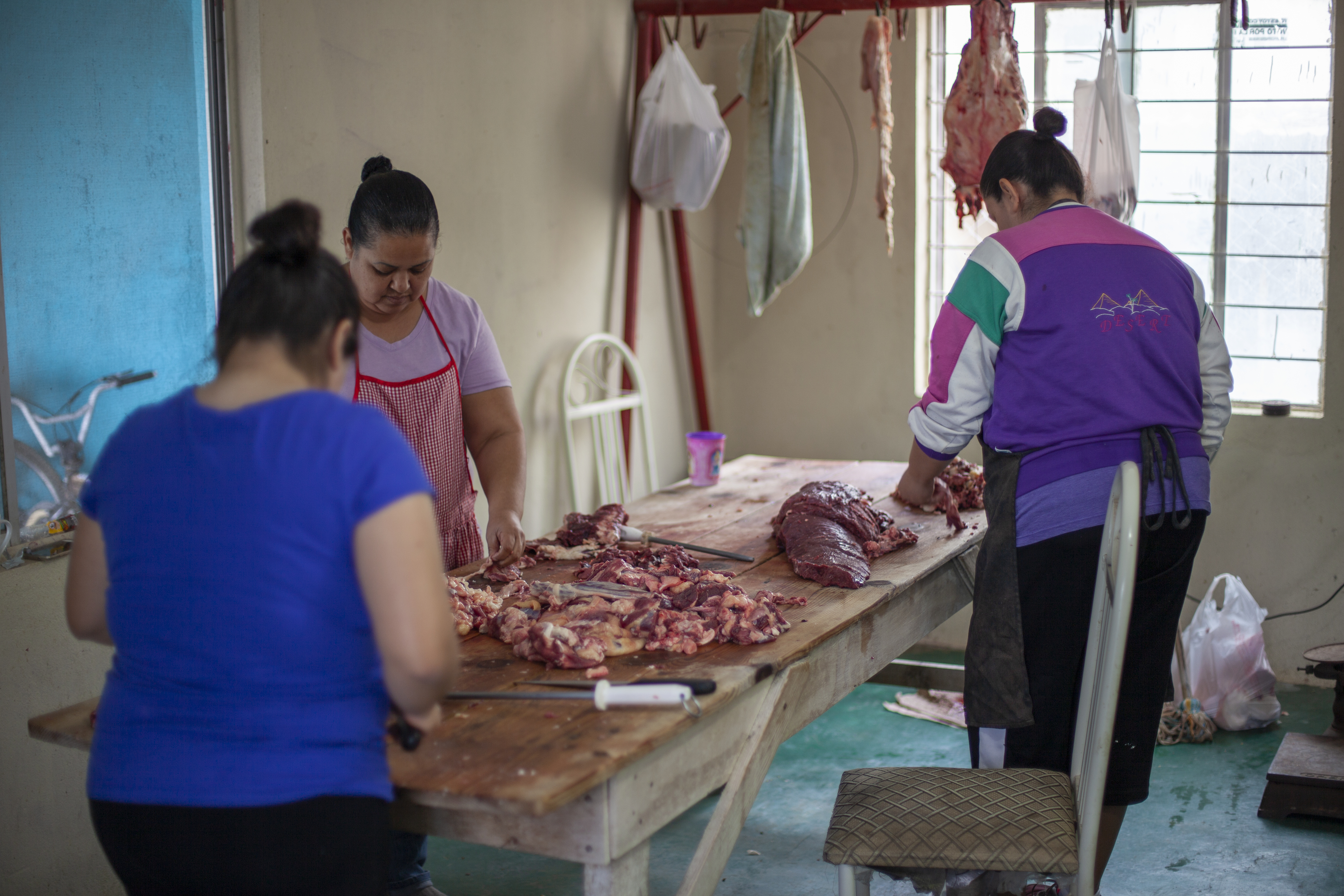
Butchers in General Treviño, 2020

General Treviño originated from a ranch named “El Puntiagudo” that was given to Don Juan Baptista Chapa on 14 January 1688. Don Francisco Chapa made the foundation in 1705. Its erection in the villa was verified on 9 December 1868, being Governor of the State Nuevo León, General Jerónimo Treviño; it belonged to the villas founded during the 19th century. The main reason for its foundation was agriculture.

General Treviño is located northeast of the state of Nuevo León, in the region called “Gran Llanura de Norte America”, in the zone denominated “Fidenor”, located in the coordinates 26º28' of west longitude. The municipality has an elevation of 188 metres (617 ft) above sealevel. General Trevino borders to the North and the West with Agualeguas, Nuevo León and Ciudad Mier, Tamaulipas; to the South with Melchor Ocampo and to the East with Los Aldamas.

The traditional foods of General Trevino include the Elote tamale, the “carne seca” and the “cabrito”. The typical candy is made of “fríjol” (bean).

General Treviño contains 1,808 inhabitants as of the 2020 census. There are 49 localities in the municipality, of which the most important are: San Javier, Rancho El Faro, Buena Vista and Los Maldonado.

== Municipal presidents (mayors) of General Treviño ==
- Antioco Chapa Pérez (1939–1940)
- Francisco Salinas González (1941–1942)
- Ventura Garza Guerra (1946–1947)
- Jorge Chapa Villarreal (1955–1957)
- Juan Guerra Hinojosa (1958–1960)
- Leopoldo Hinojosa Salinas (1961–1963)
- Librado Salinas González (1964–1966)
- Fernando Vela Madrigal (1970–1971)
- Mardoqueo Hinojosa Hinojosa (1972–1973)
- Arnoldo Garza Hinojosa (1974–1976)
- Hiram Henkel Hinojosa Madrigal (1977–1979)
- Mardoqueo Hinojosa Hinojosa (1980–1982)
- Natalio Madrigal Maldonado (1983–1985)
- José Marcelo Hinojosa Salinas (1986–1988)
- Jesús Oscar González Garza (1989–1991)
- José Marcelo Hinojosa Salinas (1992–1994)
- Norma Herminia Pérez Maldonado (1994–1997)
- Ildefonso Hinojosa Moreno (1997–2000)
- Hiram Henckel Hinojosa Madrigal (2000–2003)
- Raquel Villareal Cadena (2003–2006)
- Argelio Salinas Garza (2006–2009)
- José Marcelo Hinojosa Salinas (2009–2012)
- Elia Hinojosa García (2012–2015)
- Maribel Hinojosa García (2015–2018)
- Elia Hinojosa García (2018–2021)
- Maribel Hinojosa García (2021–2027)
