= Agualeguas =

Municipality in Nuevo León, Mexico

- Municipality

- Location within Nuevo León Location within Mexico
- Coordinates: 26°18′0″N 99°40′48″W
- Country: Mexico
- State: Nuevo León

Government
  - Type: Municipality
  - Mayor: Aldo Castellanos Amaya
  - Federal electoral district: Nuevo León's 13th

Population (2020 census)
  - Total: 3,382
- Time zone: UTC-6 (Zona Centro)

Agualeguas is a municipality located in the northeastern part of the state of Nuevo León, Mexico, (26°19′N 99°32′W). The name "Agualeguas" honors the first inhabitants of the region, the Gualegua tribe. It was recognized as a village on January 7, 1821, by the colonial government when Bro. Diego Velázquez declared it the village of "St. Nicholas of Gualeguas."

The municipality itself has an area of 980.9 km^{2} and is located 180 meters above sea level. According to the 2020 census, the municipality has a population of 3,382 inhabitants, a decrease of 1.8% from its 3,443 inhabitants according to the 2010 census data.

== Municipal Presidents of Agualeguas ==
- (1935 - 1936): Oscar N. Escudero Gonzales
- (1989 - 1991): Reynaldo Canales Vela
- (1992 - 1994): Juan José Salinas García
- (1994 - 1997): Elio Molina Salinas
- (1997 - 2000): Vicente Canales Cantú
- (2000 - 2003): Ignacio de Jesús Castellanos Ramos
- (2003 - 2006): Vicente Canales Cantú
- (2006 - 2009): José Israel González Rodríguez
- (2009 - 2012): José Guadalupe García Garza
- (2012 - 2015): José Israel González Rodríguez
- (2015 - 2018): José Luis García Montemayor
- (2018 - 2021): Ignacio Castellanos Amaya
- (2021 - 2024): Ignacio Castellanos Amaya
- (2024 - 2027): Aldo Castellanos Amaya

== See also ==
- Cerralvo Municipality
- Sabinas Hidalgo
- Municipalities of Nuevo León
- Nuevo León
