= General Terán, Nuevo León =

Coordinates: 25°16′N 99°41′W

General Terán
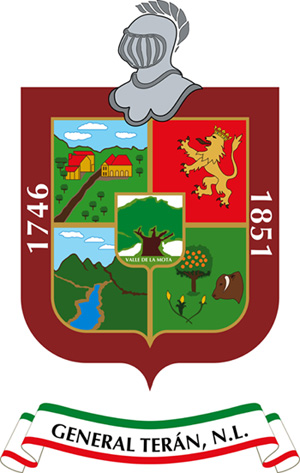
- Coat of arms
- Interactive map of General Terán

Government
  - Mayor: David Jonathan Sánchez Quintanilla (MC)
  - Federal electoral district: Nuevo León's 9th

Population (2020 census)
  - Total: 14,109
- Time zone: UTC-6 (Zona Centro)

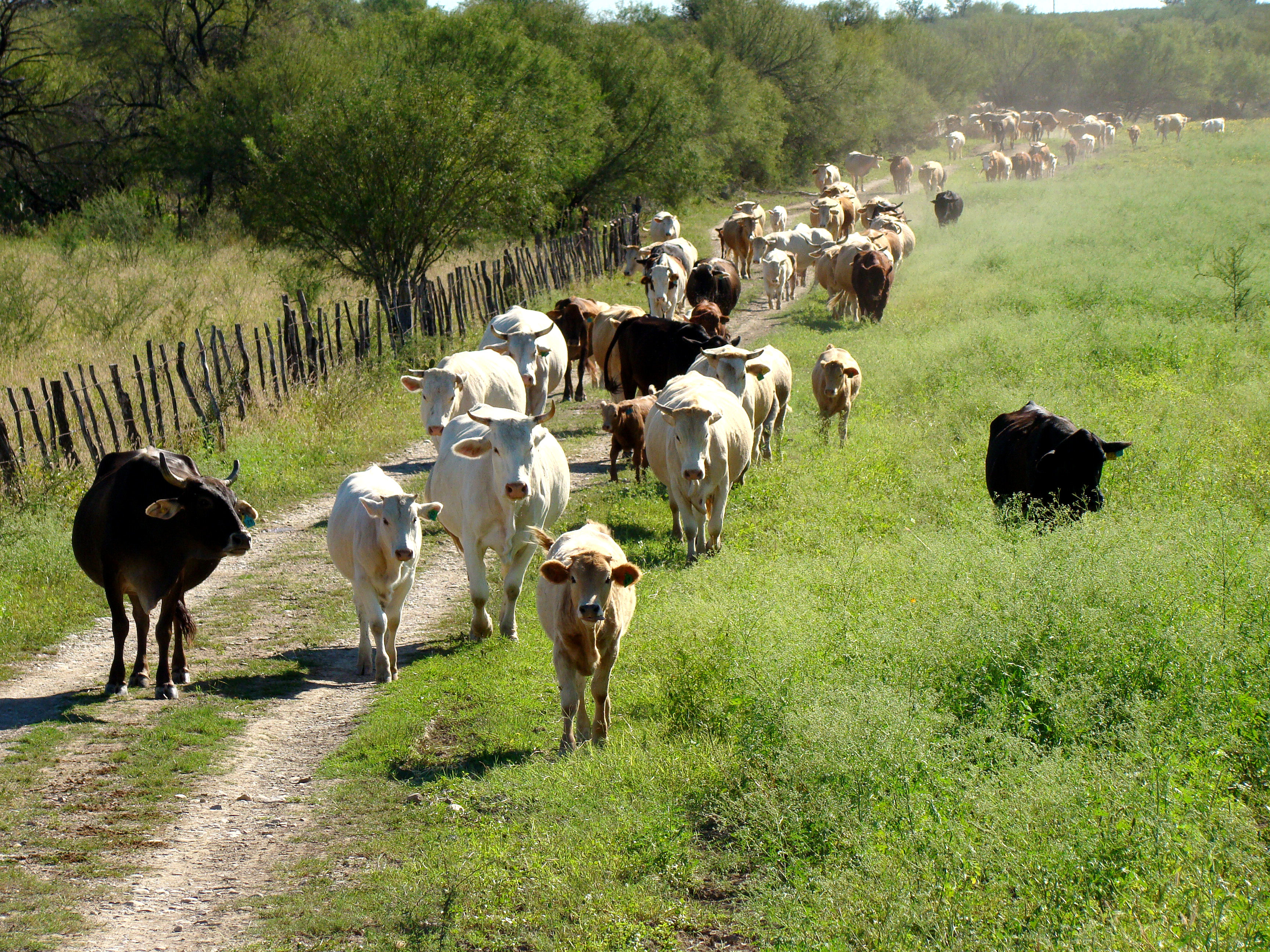
Livestock in General Terán.

General Terán is a municipality located in Nuevo León, Mexico. It was given its name in honour of General Manuel Mier y Terán. It has a 2,465 km^{2} (952 sq mi) territorial extension. To the north it borders Los Ramones Linares, Montemorelos in the south and the State of Tamaulipas, China in the east and west with Montemorelos and Cadereyta Jiménez.

In 2023, General Teran was designated a Pueblo Mágico by the Mexican government, recognizing its cultural and historical importance. The economy is based on agriculture, industry, and services. Crops grown include oranges, nuts, and corn, while local industry includes milk processing and clothing maquiladoras.

== History ==
Previously took the name of finance solitude of the Mota, located in the North of the River pilon and surrounded by other so many estates as the de San Rafael of the Llano, La Purísima, San Pedro, San Pablo, Ojo de Agua, etc. margin

To the north side of the municipal header of what today is General Teran N.L. is located property now known as Mota Soledad, where the then President of Mexico, Plutarco Elias Calles, organize and afino known today as party revolutionary institutional PRI political Institute.

First paved road of the State of Nuevo León, which connects the municipality of Montemorelos with General Teran, this due to in the 20s and 30s the President of Mexico Plutarco Elias Calles, travelling from Mexico City to spend a few days in its General Teran municipality, property towards travelling by train to the municipality of Montemorelos and took a car to reach General Terán, located just 10 km away.

== Economy ==
=== Agriculture ===
A variety of crops are grown including oranges, nuts, sorghum, corn, beans and wheat. Livestock farming specialises in the breeding of cattle, goats, pigs, horses and bottlenose.

=== Industry ===
There are companies devoted to milk processing, butter, bloqueras, clothes maquiladoras and artificial flowers processing factory sweets.

=== Tourism ===
Five kilometers from the municipal header is Recreativo "Sabino scoop", which is a sabino millenary and great circumference with a spring that never dries at its center. Sport fishing is available in the "Los glazing" dam (45 km.) and José Noriega (Los Mimbres) 84 km. municipal header can practice.

=== Services ===
There are commercial plazas with shops selling furniture, footwear, food, materials for construction, stationery, regional central form of meat of all kinds, etc.

Other businesses include metalworking machinery sales, car repairers, tire repairers, restaurants, medical clinics, laboratory testing, pharmacies, photographic studies, banks, funeral homes, currency exchange, petrol stations, etc.

== See also ==
- Terán
