= China, Nuevo León =

China
- Municipality and town
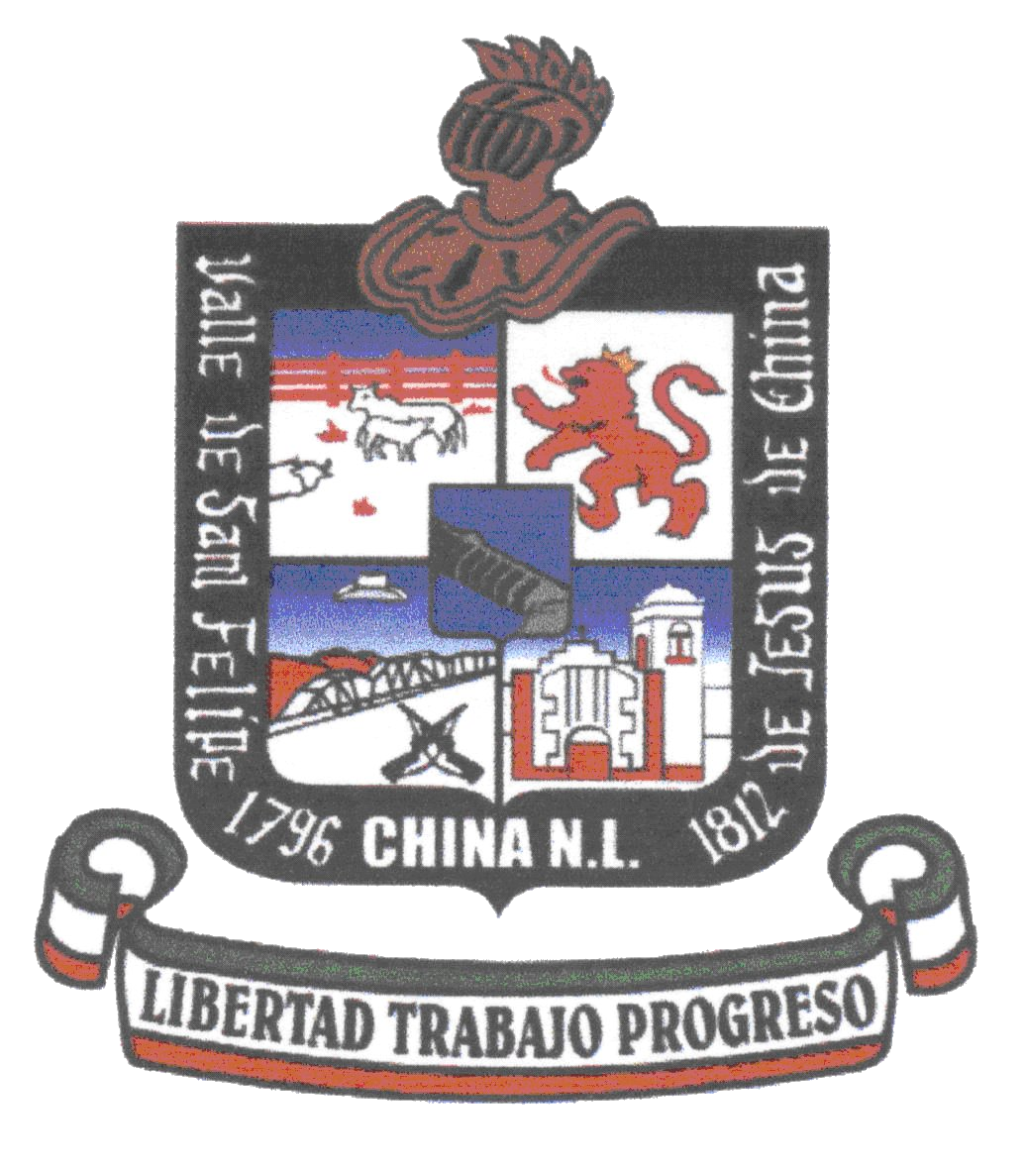
- Coat of arms

- Location within Nuevo León Location within Mexico
- Coordinates: 25°42′21″N 99°14′24″W
- Country: Mexico
- State: Nuevo León
- Municipal seat: China

Government
  - Federal electoral district: Nuevo León's 14th

Population (2010)
  - Total: 10,000
- Time zone: UTC-6 (Zona Centro)
- Website: www.china.gob.mx

China is a municipality in the Mexican state of Nuevo León. China is approximately 60 mi (97 km) northeast of Monterrey.

According to a 2020 census, China had 8264 inhabitants. The town is home to the Presa El Cuchillo reservoir.

== Localities ==
- San Bernardo
