= Los Herreras =

Municipality in Nuevo León, Mexico

Coordinates: 25°54′N 99°24′W

- Municipality
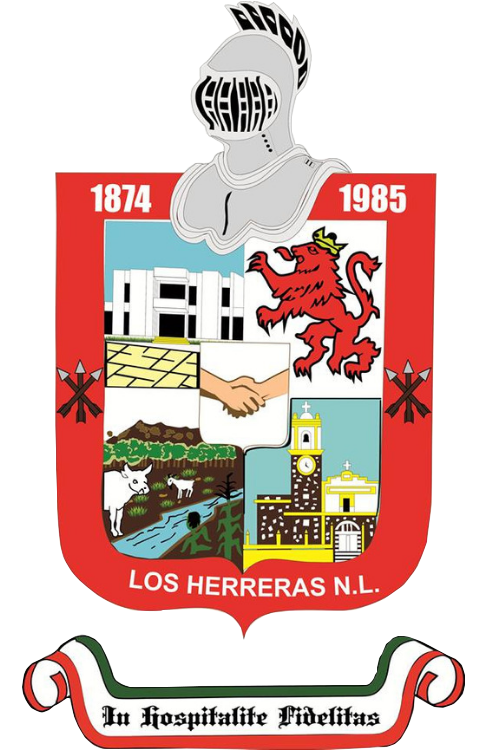
- Coat of arms

- Location in Mexico Los Herreras (Mexico)
- Country: Mexico
- State: Nuevo León

Government
  - Federal electoral district: Nuevo León's 14th
- Demonym: (in Spanish)
- Time zone: UTC-6 (Zona Centro)

Los Herreras is a municipality in the state of Nuevo León, Mexico and also the name of its seat of government and main population center. Los Herreras is at 281 meters above sea level and is located in the east-central part of the state. Its coordinates are 25º53' N and 99º33' W.

== History ==
The foundation of this village goes back to the middle of the 17th century and was originally called 'Rancho de la Manteca', Spanish for Lard Ranch. Don Juan de Zavala was given a land grant for its foundation by the governor, Don Martín de Zavala. Juan de Zavala and inhabitants from Cadereyta began the foundation.

The haciendas of San Vicente, Guadalupe and San Agustín, which are all under the jurisdiction of the modern municipality of Los Herreras, were all older foundations with larger populations than Rancho de la Manteca. However, this last one was chosen as the head of the municipality for its closeness to the railroad line that went between Monterrey and Matamoros.

Rancho de la Manteca was elevated to the status of township ("Villa") by a state congressional decree on November 20, 1874, which was signed into law by governor Don Ramón Treviño on December 9, 1874.

At its elevation to township status, the name of the municipality was changed to Los Herreras. The most commonly accepted reason for the selection of this name is that it was to honor the Herrera brothers, heroes of the battle of San Bernabe during Mexico's fight for independence from Spain.

== Geography ==
Los Herreras is at 281 meters above sea level and is located in the east-central part of the state.

=== Climate ===
The climate is an arid dry steppe, with very high temperatures in the summer and very little rainfall. The average annual temperature is 24°C and average annual precipitation is 500 mm. May and September are the rainiest months. Predominant winds are from the east.

== Population ==
According to the 1990 federal census, the municipality had a population of 3,363 — a density of 7.68/km^{2}. 69.91% of the population lived in the municipal seat. The census total showed that 1,705 inhabitants were male and 1,658 female.

The 2000 federal census showed a population decline compared to the previous count, with a total of 2,795 inhabitants, of which 50.8% were male and 49.2% female.

The population, like most of the northern part of the state, is predominantly of European or "White" descent, most of which are concentrated in the communities of San Agustin, San Vicente, La Laja and La Hacienda de Guadalupe.

== Population centers ==
The municipality has 21 population centers, among the principal ones are:

- Los Herreras — Main population center and seat of government.
- San Vicente — Second largest population center.
- San Agustin — Third largest population center.
- San Jose de La Laja — Fourth largest population center.
- Barretosa — Fifth largest population center.
- La Hacienda de Guadalupe — Sixth population center.
