= Politics and government of Nuevo León =

Politics of Nuevo León, Mexico

Popularly elected positions in Nuevo León
Title	Positions	Period
Governor	1	6 years
Mayors	51	3 years
State deputies	26	3 years
Federal deputies	12	3 years
Senators (federal)	2	6 years
Next state election	July 2021

The governmental structures of Nuevo León, a Mexican state, are organized according to article 30 of the state constitution, which provides for a republican, representative and popular government, divided into three independent branches (executive, legislative and judicial) that cannot be joined together in a single person or institution. Nuevo León's relation with the federal government of Mexico places it in a similar relation to that federal government as any other Mexican state, but it retains certain aspects of sovereignty with respect to other Mexican states and even toward foreign countries, especially with reference to its own internal affairs.

== Executive power ==
Results of the gubernatorial election (2003)
Party	Percentage	Votes
PAN	33.80	491,973
PRI/PVEM/FC	56.66	824,567
PRD	1.03	14,934
PT	4.99	72,620
PSN	0.18	2,592
PAS	0.13	1,959
MU	0.25	3,710
Null ballots	2.95	42,989
Total	100	1,455,344

Executive power rests in a governor, who is directly elected by the citizens, using a secret ballot, to a 6-year term with no possibility of reelection. The position is open only to a Mexican citizen by birth, at least 30 years old with at least 5 years residency in Nuevo León. As of 2021, the office is held by Samuel García Sepúlveda of the Citizen's Movement. The executive branch includes various institutions, which can be divided into two basic types: centralized public administration and parastatal public administration. Centralized public administration consists of the state-level secretaries of departments, statewide procurement, and their subordinates. Parastatal public administration consists of decentralized public entities, such as enterprises in which the state government has majority control and public trusteeships.

Nuevo León has not always had a democratically elected governor; see Governors of Nuevo León.

== Legislative power ==
Parties represented in the LXXI Legislature
Party	Directly elected	Plurinominal	Total
PRI	.	.	15
PAN	.	.	22
PT	0	2	2
PANAL	0	2	2
PRD	0	1	1
Total	26	16	42

Legislative power rests in a unicameral legislature composed of 42 deputies, also elected via secret ballot by the citizenry, 26 of whom are directly elected and 16 chosen according to a plurinominal system involving proportional representation. As of 2006 the LXXI Legislature of Nuevo León consists of 15 PRI deputies, 22 PAN deputies, 2 from PT, 2 from PANAL and 1 from PRD. To become a deputy, one must be a Mexican citizen by birth, at least 21 years old with at least 5 years residency in Nuevo León.

== Judicial power ==
Judicial power is invested in the Superior Court of Justice of Nuevo León, along with 7 ministers elected to a Consejo de la Judicatura for a term of 10 years, with the possibility of succeeding themselves once. These are elected by the state congress from a list presented by the governor. The Tribunal and the Council supervise 12 judicial districts. Membership of the Tribunal is limited to Mexican citizens by birth, at least 35 years old, with at least ten years practicing law with the title of Licenciado en Derecho, and at least 5 years residency in Nuevo León. The Presiding Minister Gustavo Adolfo Guerrero Gutiérrez was elected on August 1, 2007.

== Political parties ==
In accord with article 40 of the State Electoral Law, official recognition of a political party is determined by the State Electoral Commission only after verifying that the party has received 1.5% or more of the votes in a local election. As of 2004, the recognized parties are PRI, PAN, PRD, PVEM, PT and CD.

== Municipalities ==
Nuevo León consists of 51 autonomous municipalities, each headed by a mayor ('presidente municipal / alcalde) with a 3-year term; mayors can serve no more than two consecutive terms. Mayors must be Mexican citizens by birth, at least 21 years old with at least one-year residency in the municipality. As of 2004, the municipalities are:

- Abasolo
- Agualeguas
- Los Aldamas
- Allende
- Anáhuac
- Apodaca
- Aramberri
- Bustamante
- Cadereyta Jiménez
- El Carmen
- Cerralvo
- China
- Ciénega de Flores
- Doctor Arroyo
- Doctor Coss
- Doctor González
- Escobedo
- Galeana
- García
- General Bravo
- General Terán
- General Treviño
- Guadalupe
- Los Herreras
- Hidalgo
- Higueras
- Hualahuises
- Iturbide
- Juárez
- Lampazos de Naranjo
- Linares
- Marín
- Melchor Ocampo
- Mier y Noriega
- Mina
- Montemorelos
- Monterrey (capital)
- Parás
- Pesquería
- Los Ramones
- Rayones
- Sabinas Hidalgo
- Salinas Victoria
- San Nicolás de los Garza
- San Pedro Garza García
- Santa Catarina
- Santiago
- Vallecillo
- Villaldama
- Zaragoza
- General Zuazua.

== Citizenship ==
According to the state constitution, a Nuevoleonese citizen is a person who was either born in Nuevo León or a Mexican citizen who has maintained residency in the state for more than two years and has not indicated to the municipal authorities a desire to preserve his/her previous citizenship. Citizenship can be lost or suspended, among other reasons, for being or becoming a Mexican army officer in charge of federal troops entering or stationed inside the state borders or for committing certain crimes. Noble titles are not recognized and individual rights and freedoms are protected by the Title I of the state constitution.
