= Fiestas of Nuevo León =

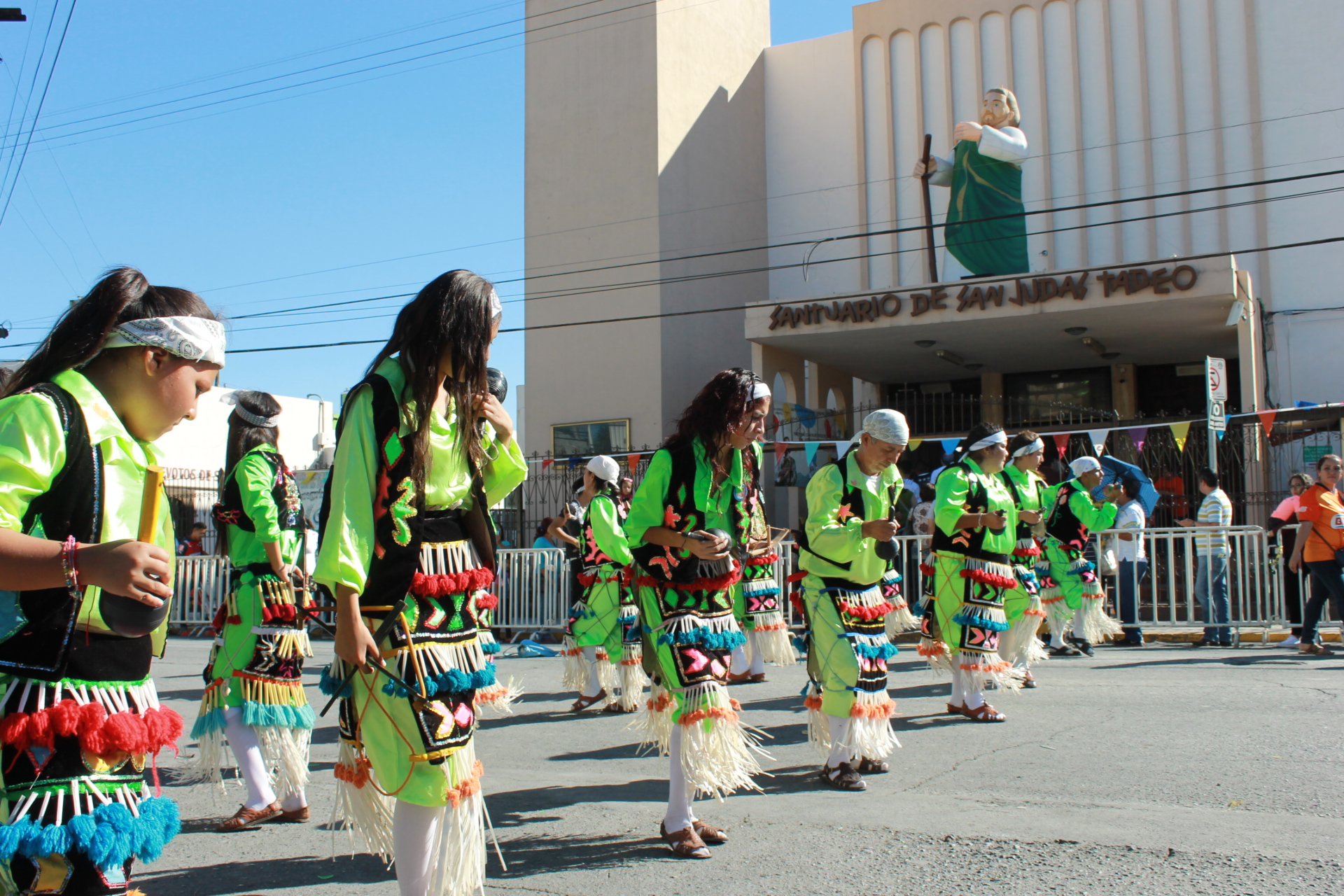
A fiesta

Most of the fiestas of the state of Nuevo León, Mexico are related to the anniversaries of the foundation of municipalities, the celebration of local Roman Catholic patron saints or exhibitions of the most popular produce of the particular region.

The majority are observed at the local level and, given that the greater part of the municipalities have few inhabitants, the festivals can be a bit austere. Nonetheless, some of them, such as the Festival del Barrio Antiguo ("Festival of the old neighborhood") or the Exposición Ganadera de Guadalupe ("Guadalupe cattle-ranching exposition") receive visitors from throughout Mexico and internationally.

== February ==
- Ciénega de Flores: Municipal holiday (February 18 to February 26).
- Escobedo: Municipal holiday (February 24 to March 12).
- General Zuazua: Municipal holiday (February 23 to March 7).

== March ==
- Allende: Feria de Allende (Allende Fair, March 12 to March 20).
- Agualeguas: Fiestas de la Semana Mayor (Party of the big week)(March 28 to April 3).
- General Terán: Aniversario de elevación a Villa (Anniversary of the elevation to villa, March 31 to April 3).
- Higueras: Feria del Orégano (Oregano Fair, March 26 to April 6).
- Hualahuises: Feria del Geranio (Geranium Fair, March 18 to March 20).
- Salinas Victoria: Municipal holiday (March 4 to March 20).

== April ==
- Abasolo: Aniversario de la fundación (Anniversary of foundation, April 3 to April 5).
- Cerralvo: Municipal holiday (April 14 to April 24).
- Hidalgo: Feria del Cemento (Cement Fair, April 8 to April 17).

== May ==
- Anáhuac: Municipal anniversary (May 1 to May 9).
- Mina: Fiestas de la Primavera (Spring holiday, May 14 to May 22).

== June ==
- Lampazos: Feria Exposición de Lampazos ( Expo Fair, June 19 to the June 28).

== July ==
- Aramberri: Feria del Aguacate (Avocado Fair, July 29 to the August 4).
- Bustamante: Feria del Señor de Tlaxcala (Señor de Tlaxcala Fair, July 28 to the August 6).
- Linares: Fiestas de Villaseca (July 29 to August 14).
- Marín: Municipal anniversary (July 8 to July 17).
- Pesquería: Feria de Pesquería (July 28 to August 7).
- Sabinas Hidalgo: Municipal anniversary (July 22 to July 31).
- Santiago: Feria de la Manzana (Apple Fair, July 29 to the August 14).

== September ==
- Apodaca: Feria Agrícola e Industrial (Agricultural and industrial fair, September 23 to October 7).
- El Carmen: Feria Industrial de la Nuez (Industrial fair of the walnut, September 10 to September 18).
- Ciénega de Flores: Feria del Machacado (September 9 to September 25).
- Monterrey: Día de fundación (city's foundation, September 20).
- Doctor Arroyo: Municipal anniversary (September 21 to September 22).
- Galeana: Feria de la Papa y la Manzana (Potato and apple fair, September 15 to September 18).

== October ==
- Doctor González: Municipal anniversary (October 28 to November 16).
- Zuazua: Feria de la Hojarasca (October 7 to October 23).
- Rayones: Feria de la Nuez (Walnut fair, October 16 to October 24).

== November ==
- General Bravo: Municipal anniversary (November 17 to November 21).

== December ==
- Agualeguas: Feria de Nuestro Señor de Agualeguas (Fair of Our Lord of Agualeguas, December 8).
- Ocampo: Municipal anniversary (December 29 to December 31).

== See also ==
- Nuevo León
- Culture of Nuevo León
- History of Nuevo León
