= Mexican Federal Highway 85D =

Toll highways in Mexico

Federal Highway 85D
- Carretera federal 85D

Route information
- Maintained by Caminos y Puentes Federales
- Length: 169 km (105 mi)
- Existed: 1991–present

Autopista Pachuca–Ciudad de México
- South end: Fed. 85 in Tlalnepantla de Baz
- North end: Fed. 85 in Tizayuca

Autopista Monterrey–Nuevo Laredo
- South end: Fed. 85 in Ciénega de Flores
- North end: Fed. 85 near Nuevo Laredo

Location
- Country: Mexico

Highway system
- Mexican Federal Highways; List; Autopistas
← Fed. 85	→ Fed. 87

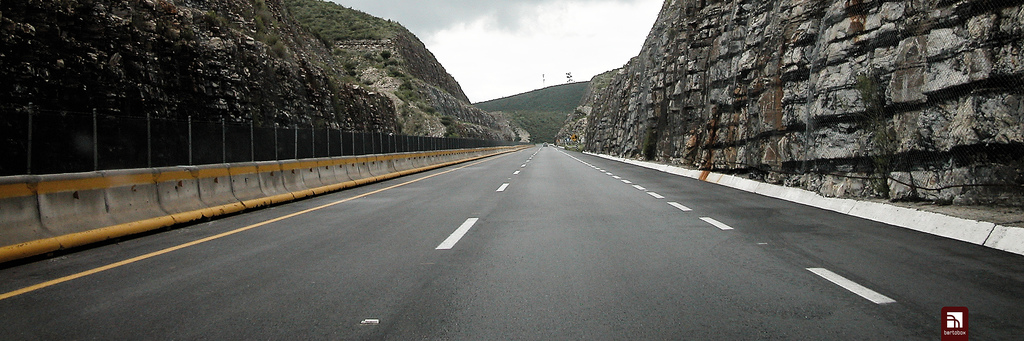
Mexican Federal Highway 85 from Nuevo Laredo - Monterrey

Carretera Federal 85D is the designation for toll highways (autopistas) paralleling Mexican Federal Highway 85. Two roads are designated Highway 85D, one from Nuevo Laredo, Tamaulipas, to Monterrey, Nuevo León, known as Autopista Monterrey–Nuevo Laredo, and the other from Pachuca, Hidalgo, to Mexico City, known as Autopista Pachuca–Ciudad de México. Both toll routes run parallel to their free alternative, Federal Highway 85. Highway 85D has wider lanes, offers a more direct route, and is continuously being repaired and repaved unlike the free route.

== Autopista Pachuca–Ciudad de México ==
Autopista Pachuca–Ciudad de México
- Location: State of Mexico and Hidalgo
- Length: 60.5 km (37.6 mi)

The Autopista Pachuca–Ciudad de México begins north of Tizayuca, Hidalgo, proceeding southwest and ending at an interchange on the border of Ecatepec de Morelos and Tlalnepantla, just shy of Mexico City itself. CAPUFE charges a toll of 47 pesos to use the road.

It serves as the western terminus of Mexican Federal Highway 132D (México-Tuxpan).

=== 2013 road accident ===
On 7 May 2013, the gas tanker of a tanker truck exploded after it crashed into a guardrail, killing 26 people and injuring 36.

== Autopista Monterrey–Nuevo Laredo ==
Autopista Monterrey–Nuevo Laredo
- Location: Nuevo León and Tamaulipas
- Length: 120.5 km (74.9 mi)

The second segment of Federal Highway 85D begins near Del Norte International Airport between Apodaca and Ciénega de Flores, northern suburbs of Monterrey. The highway's northern terminus at Fed. 85 just south of Fed. 2, approximately 25.5 kilometres (15.8 mi) south of central Nuevo Laredo. From San Marcos in northern Tamaulipas to its northern terminus, Autopista Monterrey–Nuevo Laredo closely parallels its parent highway. Outside of the greater Monterrey area, the highway is rural. The highway's only interchange in Tamaulipas is at its northern terminus.

The road is maintained by Caminos y Puentes Federales, Mexico's federal agency in charge of maintaining and operating federal highways and bridges, with a toll of 219 pesos.

Junction list

State	Municipality	Location	km	mi	Destinations	Notes
Nuevo León	Ciénega de Flores	Ciénega de Flores	0.0	0.0	Fed. 85 – Monterrey, Nuevo Laredo libre	Southern terminus
Nuevo León	Ciénega de Flores	Ciénega de Flores	6.4	4.0	SH 188 – Salinas Victoria, Ciénega de Flores, Nuevo Laredo libre	
Nuevo León	Salinas Victoria		18.1	11.2	Fed. 85D – Monterrey, Nuevo Laredo	
Nuevo León	Sabinas Hidalgo		54.4	33.8	SH 6 – Agualeguas, Sabinas Hidalgo	
Nuevo León	Vallecillo		74.2	46.1	SH 2 – Parás, Sabinas Hidalgo	
Nuevo León	Vallecillo		90.5	56.2	SH 4 – San Carlos	
Nuevo León	Anáhuac		120.4	74.8	Fed. 85 – Monterrey libre, Nuevo Laredo libre	
			150.3– 0.0	93.4– 0.0	Nuevo León–Tamaulipas state line	
Tamaulipas	Guerrero		18.5	11.5	Fed. 85 north – Nuevo Laredo	Northern terminus; northbound exit and southbound entrance
1.000 mi = 1.609 km; 1.000 km = 0.621 mi: Incomplete access; Tolled
