= Mina, Nuevo León =

Coordinates: 26°01′N 100°31′W

- Municipality
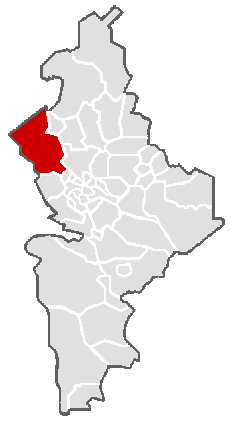
- Country: Mexico
- State: Nuevo León
- Founded: 1608

Government
  - Type: Municipality
  - Mayor: Edgar Molina Elizondo (MC)
  - Federal electoral district: Nuevo León's 13th

Area
  - Total: 3,915 km^{2} (1,512 sq mi)
- Elevation: 600 m (2,000 ft)

Population (2020 census)
  - Total: 6,048 (municipality)
  - Density: 1.545/km^{2} (4.001/sq mi)
- Time zone: UTC-6 (Zona Centro)
- Website: www.mina.gob.mx

Mina is a town and municipality located in the Northwestern part of the northeastern Mexican state of Nuevo León. The population was 6,048 at the 2020 census. Its name honors Spaniard insurgent general Francisco Javier Mina, who fought for the Mexican side in the independence movement from Spain. Located at the northwestern part of the state of Nuevo León. Mina is a renowned tourist destination, for its mysticism and legends in the state of Nuevo León.

== History ==
The municipality is part of a historical region called Valle de Salinas (Spanish for 'Salinas Valley') which was an administrative area of the New Kingdom of León during the Spanish colonial period. It was founded in 1608 by Canarian captain Bernabé de las Casas along with other Spanish and Canarian's settlers establishing the San Francisco de Cañas settlement (Named for Saint Francis of Assisi and cañas, a Spanish word for "reeds"), as it was established in a place surrounded by water springs and reeds, possibly around the Salinas River (Nuevo León), which courses across the municipality. San Francisco de Cañas was part of the Valle de las Salinas (Spanish for 'Salinas Valley'). The Salinas Valley was one of the fourteen subdivisions of the New Kingdom of León. It comprised the present-day municipalities of Abasolo, El Carmen, Mina, Hidalgo and Salinas Victoria, being the last one the administrative seat of the Salinas Valley. San Francisco de Cañas, often referred as Cañas until it was created as a municipality on May 31, 1851, therefore it was separated from the Salinas Valley administrative region, and was renamed as Mina. In honor of Spanish general Francisco Javier Mina.

Since its foundation in the Spanish colonial period and much of the 19th century, the municipality of Mina, and many other regions in Nuevo León and northeastern Mexico, remained isolated from the rest of Mexico, the centralist government of then, did not take up nor support many affairs and problems in the north, where there were a constant war against the Native Americans, in the first instance it was against the native Cuanales and Aiguales, subsequently in the late 18th and 19th century, the region was marked by violent Comanche and Apache raids from Texas, before and after it was annexed to the United States, those raiders often came to the region to steal cattle, livestock, properties, and attack the inhabitants. The region, especially the northern part of Nuevo León, where Mina is located, witnessed many cruelty and fierce battles against the Native Americans, this region was often known itself as tierra de guerra viva (Spanish: fierce war land). Several sites of historic battles took place in the region, such as in the Hacienda del Muerto, a former agricultural and livestock ranch, which also served as fort during many successful battles.

By the late 1850s, New Leonese governor Santiago Vidaurri, claimed the war had finished and there were no Native Americans in the region, after the Native Americans in the region were exterminated and the Apache and Comanche raiders were defeated. However, in the subsequent years the raids still continued although with much less proportion, until these raids virtually disappeared by late 19th century. However, the short period of peace had finished when the Mexican Revolution reached the region, New Leonese general Mariano Escobedo, achieved important victories against Porfirio Díaz forces, who was tremendously defeated in the Icamole fields, outside the Hacienda del Muerto. Although the victory was for the locals, this war attached a decreasing period for the Hacienda del Muerto, which did not fully recovered its golden age of several years ago, as well as, the Mexican revolution imposed a policy applied throughout all the country during the Mexican revolution which affected the state properties. The hacienda del Muerto, regarded as one of the most important historic sites in the state of Nuevo León, was sold in the early 20th century, later abandoned and it remained in ruins, almost isolated for many years.

In 1989 were discovered a great mammoth fossil by an expedition of paleontologists in the municipality, which arose the interest of creating a paleontology museum in Mina, which is now the Bernabé de las Casas museum. In recent years has been an increasing interest in developing tourism in Mina as well as in the Salinas valley region, Nuevo León, and northeastern Mexico.

== Geography ==
Mina is the sixth-largest municipality in Nuevo León, though it has one of the lowest population densities among municipalities, being just ahead of Vallecillo and Parás. Mina borders north with the municipality of Candela, west with Castaños and southwest with Ramos Arizpe in the state of Coahuila, and northeast with the municipalities of Bustamante and Villaldama, east with Salinas Victoria and Hidalgo, and south with García, all in the state of Nuevo León.

=== Flora and fauna ===
Vegetation in this region consists of several types of desert bushes, Huisache (Vachellia farnesiana var. farnesiana), mesquite (Prosopis spp.), Echinocereus enneacanthus, Opuntia spp., as well as Lechuguilla (Agave lechuguilla), Sotol (Dasylirion texanum) are abundant throughout the municipality, and there are several endemic plants, among them are Candelilla (Euphorbia antisyphilitica), Damiana (Turnera diffusa), La Gobernadora (Larrea tridentata), Hojasen (Flourensia cernua), Mariola (Parthenium incanum) and many other which have been less studied. Also, walnut, willow, pine, Oyamel (Abies religiosa), lantrisco, antelope bush (Purshia plicata), Tasajillo (Opuntia leptocaulis) are found in the highlands of the municipality close to Minas Viejas and Caja Pinta mountain range. According to recent excavations in the ejido Boca de potrerillos in this municipality, have been found at twelve meters underground, several rests of carbonized nogal, willow and several types of pine which contrasts with the present-day plants abundant in Boca de Potrerillos, which is predominantly desert, carbon 14 tests, pointed out the rests go back several centuries ago, this is an evidence about how vegetation and ecosystem has been changing through the years.

Fauna includes nine-banded armadillo, coyote, American badger, rattlesnake, deer, fox, rabbit, greater roadrunner, raccoon, great horned owl, and prairie dog, there are also several other types of mammals, birds, and reptiles.
