= List of twin towns and sister cities in Mexico =

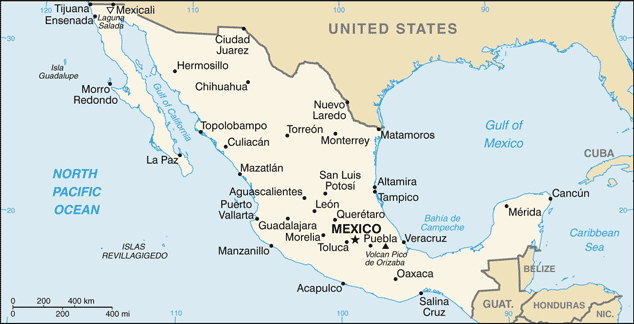
Map of Mexico

This is a list of municipalities in Mexico which have standing links to local communities in other countries. In most cases, the association, especially when formalised by local government, is known as "town twinning" (usually in Europe) or "sister cities" (usually in the rest of the world).

== A ==
Acámbaro

- Greenfield, United States
- Laredo, United States

Acapulco

- Beverly Hills, United States
- Cannes, France
- Cartagena, Colombia
- Eilat, Israel
- Onjuku, Japan
- Qingdao, China
- Sendai, Japan

Agua Prieta

- Douglas, United States

Aguascalientes

- Lampa, Peru
- Lynwood, United States
- Modesto, United States
- O Salnés, Spain
- Pharr, United States
- Temple, United States

Álamos

- Scottsdale, United States

Allende

- San Elizario, United States

Ángel Albino Corzo

- Ayutla, Guatemala
- La Blanca, Guatemala
- Catarina, Guatemala
- Coatepeque, Guatemala
- Malacatán, Guatemala
- Ocós, Guatemala

La Antigua

- Medellín, Spain

Atizapán de Zaragoza

- Sanford, United States
- Zaragoza, Spain

Ayotlán

- Storm Lake, United States

== B ==
Benito Juárez

- Antigua Guatemala, Guatemala
- Granadilla de Abona, Spain
- Hangzhou, China
- Mar del Plata, Argentina
- Medellín, Colombia
- Mission, United States
- Naperville, United States
- Pharr, United States
- Punta del Este, Uruguay
- Sanya, China
- Wichita, United States

Boca del Río

- Tacoma, United States
- Tampa, United States
- West Valley City, United States

== C ==
Caborca

- Prescott, United States
- Upland, United States

Cadereyta Jiménez

- McAllen, United States

Calkiní

- Colón, Cuba

Campeche

- Cartagena, Colombia
- Halifax, Canada
- Ibiza, Spain
- Laredo, United States
- Matanzas, Cuba
- Quetzaltenango, Guatemala
- Volusia County, United States

Cañadas de Obregón

- Superior, United States

Cananea

- Radebeul, Germany
- Sierra Vista, United States

Casas Grandes

- San Elizario, United States

Cedral

- Alton, United States
- Chicago Heights, United States

Celaya

- Durham, United States
- Rio Grande City, United States
- San Gabriel, United States
- Vigo, Spain

Centro

- San Bernardino, United States

Cerralvo

- Laredo, United States
- Roma, United States

Chapala

- Barrhead, Canada

Chiapa de Corzo

- Cuéllar, Spain
- Quetzaltenango, Guatemala
- Tejutla, Guatemala

Chihuahua

- Albuquerque, United States
- Aurora, United States
- El Paso, United States
- Midland, United States
- Pueblo, United States

Chilpancingo de los Bravo

- McAllen, United States

Ciénega de Flores

- Laredo, United States

Cihuatlán

- Vigan, Philippines

Ciudad Juárez

- El Paso, United States
- Jerez de la Frontera, Spain
- San Elizario, United States

Ciudad Obregón

- Tucson, United States

Ciudad Valles

- Abangares, Costa Rica
- Corral, Chile
- Laredo, United States
- Pharr, United States

Ciudad Victoria

- McAllen, United States

Coatzacoalcos

- Rizhao, China
- San Fernando, Philippines
- Shandong, China

Colima

- Norman, United States
- Redwood City, United States
- San Fernando, United States

Comonfort

- Cleburne, United States

Córdoba

- Baton Rouge, United States
- Chillicothe, United States
- Córdoba, Argentina
- Córdoba, Spain

Cozumel

- Caravaca de la Cruz, Spain
- Miami Beach, United States

Cuautitlán Izcalli

- Diez de Octubre (Havana), Cuba

Cuautla, Jalisco

- Renton, United States

Cuautla, Morelos

- Riverside, United States

Cuernavaca

- Cavite City, Philippines
- Denver, United States
- General Villegas, Argentina
- Laredo, United States
- Minneapolis, United States
- Minoh, Japan

== E ==
Ensenada

- Newport Beach, United States
- Redondo Beach, United States
- Riverside, United States

Erongarícuaro

- Jovellanos, Cuba

Ecatepec

- Guarulhos, Brazil
- San José, Costa Rica

Etzatlán

- Cienfuegos, Cuba

== G ==
García

- McAllen, United States

General Escobedo

- Laredo, United States

General Terán

- Laredo, United States

Gómez Palacio

- South El Monte, United States

Guadalajara

- Alajuela, Costa Rica
- Albuquerque, United States
- Caracas, Venezuela
- Cebu City, Philippines
- Cigales, Spain
- Changwon, South Korea
- Curitiba, Brazil
- Daejeon, South Korea
- Downey, United States
- Guadalajara, Spain
- Hagåtña, Guam
- Kansas City, United States
- Kingston, Jamaica
- Kyoto, Japan
- Lansing, United States
- Laredo, United States
- Lima, Peru
- Malabo, Equatorial Guinea
- Natal, Brazil
- Oñati, Spain
- Panama City, Panama
- Portland, United States
- Saint Petersburg, Russia
- San Antonio, United States
- San José, Costa Rica
- San Jose, United States
- San Salvador, El Salvador
- Santo Domingo, Dominican Republic
- Seville, Spain
- Tegucigalpa, Honduras
- Tucson, United States
- Wrocław, Poland
- Xiamen, China

Guadalupe

- Edinburg, United States
- Laredo, United States
- McAllen, United States
- Reno, United States
- Woodstock, United States

Guanajuato

- Alcalá de Henares, Spain
- Alcázar de San Juan, Spain
- Ávila, Spain
- Arequipa, Peru
- Ashland, United States
- Cuenca, Ecuador
- Morgantown, United States
- Old Havana (Havana), Cuba
- Salinas, United States
- San Fernando de Henares, Spain
- Santa Fe, Spain
- South Bend, United States
- Toledo, Spain

Guaymas

- Mesa, United States

Guerrero

- San Elizario, United States

== H ==
Hermosillo

- Irvine, United States
- Norwalk, United States
- Phoenix, United States

Los Herreras

- Laredo, United States

Hidalgo

- Goliad, United States

Hidalgo del Parral

- San Elizario, United States
- Santa Fe, United States

Huatabampo

- Gardena, United States

Huixquilucan

- Alajuela, Costa Rica
- Eshkol, Israel
- (Republic of Ireland) Longford, Ireland

== I ==
Irapuato

- Chula Vista, United States
- Green Bay, United States
- Marianao (Havana), Cuba
- McAllen, United States
- Murcia, Spain

Isla Mujeres

- Almirante Brown, Argentina
- Bonita Springs, United States
- Chascomús, Argentina
- Florencio Varela, Argentina
- Helena, United States
- Lanús, Argentina
- Mar del Plata, Argentina
- Mission, United States
- Old Havana (Havana), Cuba
- Pensacola, United States
- Quilmes, Argentina
- San Juan, Argentina
- St. Petersburg, United States

Ixtapan de la Sal

- Guantánamo, Cuba

== J ==
Jalostotitlán

- Livingston, United States

Janos

- San Elizario, United States

Jerez de García Salinas

- Laredo, United States

Jesús María

- Queen Creek, United States

Jiménez

- San Elizario, United States

Jocotepec

- Plymouth, United States
- Watsonville, United States

Juchitán de Zaragoza

- La Vall d'Uixó, Spain

== L ==
Lagos de Moreno

- Brea, United States

Lampazos de Naranjo

- Laredo, United States

Lázaro Cárdenas

- Laredo, United States

León

- Bogotá, Colombia
- Cangas de Onís, Spain
- Havana, Cuba
- Irving, United States
- Laredo, United States
- Las Vegas, United States
- León, Nicaragua
- León, Spain
- Novo Hamburgo, Brazil
- San Diego, United States

Lerdo

- Las Cruces, United States

Lerma

- Lerma, Italy
- Lerma, Spain
- Rosario de Lerma, Argentina

== M ==
El Mante

- Boulder, United States

Magdalena de Kino

- Sahuarita, United States
- Temple City, United States

Manzanillo

- Flagstaff, United States
- Saint Paul, United States
- San Pablo, United States
- Valparaíso, Chile

Marín

- Von Ormy, United States

Mazatlán

- Grande Prairie, Canada
- Hamm, Germany
- Pharr, United States
- Puntarenas, Costa Rica
- San Ysidro (San Diego), United States
- Santa Monica, United States
- Seattle, United States
- Tucson, United States

Mérida

- Camagüey, Cuba
- Chiquinquirá, Colombia
- Erie, United States
- Incheon, South Korea
- Manzanares, Colombia
- Mérida, Spain
- Mérida, Venezuela
- Miami, United States
- New Orleans, United States
- Panama City, United States
- Sarasota, United States

Metepec

- Antigua Guatemala, Guatemala
- Pharr, United States
- San Carlos, United States
- Trujillo, Peru
- Villanueva de la Cañada, Spain

Mexicali

- Calexico, United States
- Nanjing, China
- Sacramento, United States
- San Bernardino, United States
- Taichung, Taiwan

Mexico City

- Beijing, China
- Berlin, Germany
- Cádiz, Spain
- Cerro (Havana), Cuba
- Chicago, United States
- Cusco, Peru
- Havana, Cuba
- Istanbul, Turkey
- Kyiv, Ukraine
- Kuwait City, Kuwait
- Los Angeles, United States
- Madrid, Spain
- Nagoya, Japan
- Quito, Ecuador
- Samarkand, Uzbekistan
- San Antonio de los Baños, Cuba
- San José, Costa Rica
- Seoul, South Korea
- Tegucigalpa, Honduras

Mexico City – Coyoacán

- (Republic of Ireland) Clifden, Ireland

Mexico City – Cuauhtémoc

- Seocho (Seoul), South Korea

Mexticacán

- Laredo, United States

Monclova

- Laredo, United States

Montemorelos

- Laredo, United States

Monterrey

- Barcelona, Spain
- Bethlehem, Palestine
- Bilbao, Spain
- Cape Town, South Africa
- Concepción, Chile
- Dallas, United States
- Guatemala City, Guatemala
- Hamilton, Canada
- Iași, Romania
- McAllen, United States
- Medellín, Colombia
- Monterrei, Spain
- Olongapo, Philippines
- Orlando, United States
- Rosario, Argentina
- San Antonio, United States
- San Salvador, El Salvador
- Shenyang, China
- Surabaya, Indonesia

Morelia

- Arequipa, Peru
- Caspueñas, Spain
- Fullerton, United States
- Gettysburg, United States
- Kansas City, United States
- Madrigal de las Altas Torres, Spain
- Matanzas, Cuba
- Monterey Park, United States
- Norwalk, United States
- Old Havana (Havana), Cuba
- Shreveport, United States
- Sopó, Colombia
- Valladolid, Spain
- Yakima, United States

Moroleón

- Esquipulas, Guatemala
- Kennett Square, United States

Mulegé

- Union City, United States

== N ==
Nacozari de García

- Douglas, United States

Nahuatzen

- Martí, Cuba

Naucalpan de Juárez

- Anyang, South Korea
- Calgary, Canada
- Pittsburgh, United States
- Pozuelo de Alarcón, Spain

Nezahualcóyotl

- Stamford, United States

Nicolás Romero

- Belén, Costa Rica

Nogales

- Nogales, United States

Nuevo Casas Grandes

- Colorado Springs, United States

Nuevo Laredo

- Laredo, United States

Nuevo Parangaricutiro

- Pedro Betancourt, Cuba

== O ==
Oaxaca de Juárez

- Antequera, Spain
- Antigua Guatemala, Guatemala
- Cartago, Costa Rica
- Havana, Cuba
- Luanda, Angola
- Mérida, Venezuela
- Palo Alto, United States
- Santa Cruz, Chile

Ocotlán

- Corona, United States
- Olathe, United States
- Oxnard, United States
- Stone Park, United States

Orizaba

- Portsmouth, United States

El Oro

- Santa Cruz, Costa Rica

Othón P. Blanco

- San Pedro, Belize

== P ==
Pabellón de Arteaga

- Prairie View, United States

Palenque

- La Libertad, Guatemala

Papantla

- Laredo, United States

Paracho

- Cárdenas, Cuba

Parras

- Grapevine, United States

Pátzcuaro

- Madrigal de las Altas Torres, Spain
- Naperville, United States
- Sonoma, United States

Peribán

- Perico, Cuba

Piedras Negras

- Sandy, United States

Poncitlán

- Palmdale, United States

Puebla

- Antigua Guatemala, Guatemala
- Arequipa, Peru
- Burgo de Osma-Ciudad de Osma, Spain
- Cartagena, Colombia
- Cusco, Peru
- Fitero, Spain
- Florence, Italy
- Huntington Park, United States
- León, Spain
- Łódź, Poland
- Managua, Nicaragua
- Oklahoma City, United States
- Pueblo, United States
- San José, Costa Rica
- Talavera de la Reina, Spain
- Wonsan, North Korea
- Wuxi, China

Puerto Morelos

- Medellín, Colombia

Puerto Peñasco

- Fremont, United States
- Ruidoso, United States
- Somerton, United States
- Tucson, United States

Puerto Vallarta

- Encino (Los Angeles), United States
- Gijón, Spain
- Highland Park, United States
- Mission, United States
- San José, Costa Rica
- Santa Barbara, United States
- Siófok, Hungary

== Q ==
Querétaro

- Bakersfield, United States
- Holland, United States
- Orange, United States
- Santiago de Compostela, Spain
- Shijiazhuang, China
- Yeosu, South Korea

Quiroga

- Mayagüez, Puerto Rico

== R ==
Reynosa

- McAllen, United States
- Uberaba, Brazil

Rosarito Beach

- Glendale, United States
- Huntington Park, United States

== S ==
Saltillo

- Alma, Canada
- Los Andes, Chile
- Auburn Hills, United States
- Austin, United States
- Fredericton, Canada
- Guatemala City, Guatemala
- Holguín, Cuba
- Itagüí, Colombia
- Lansing, United States
- San José, Costa Rica
- Windsor, Canada

San Cristóbal de las Casas

- Asheville, United States
- Ciudad Real, Spain
- La Libertad, Guatemala
- Quetzaltenango, Guatemala

San José Iturbide

- Pharr, United States

San Luis Potosí

- Almadén, Spain
- Idrija, Slovenia
- Manizales, Colombia
- McAllen, United States
- Pharr, United States
- Pico Rivera, United States
- St. Louis, United States
- Tulsa, United States

San Mateo Atenco

- El Porvenir, Peru

San Miguel de Allende

- Acquaviva delle Fonti, Italy
- Cuenca, Ecuador
- Cusco, Peru
- Las Heras, Argentina
- Laredo, United States
- Old Havana (Havana), Cuba
- Redlands, United States
- Santa Fe, Spain
- Santa Fe, United States
- Tyler, United States
- Ushuaia, Argentina
- West Palm Beach, United States

San Nicolás de los Garza

- Bello, Colombia
- Seguin, United States
- Taipei, Taiwan
- Winnipeg, Canada

San Pedro Garza García

- Plano, United States
- South Padre Island, United States

Santa Bárbara

- San Elizario, United States

Santa María Huatulco

- Quetzaltenango, Guatemala

Santiago

- Edinburg, United States
- Rio Bravo, United States
- Santiago de Cuba, Cuba

Satevó

- San Elizario, United States

== T ==
Talpa de Allende

- Lynwood, United States

Tamazula de Gordiano

- Riverbank, United States

Tampico

- Houston, United States
- McAllen, United States

Tancitaro

- Pedro Betancourt, Cuba

Tangancícuaro

- Delano, United States
- Watsonville, United States

Tapachula

- Changzhou, China
- Dongying, China
- Quetzaltenango, Guatemala

Taretán

- Unión de Reyes, Cuba

Taxco de Alarcón

- Baguio, Philippines
- Baldwin Park, United States
- Canoga Park (Los Angeles), United States
- Cuenca, Spain
- McAllen, United States
- Zaruma, Ecuador

Tecámac

- Puyehue, Chile

Tecate

- Gilroy, United States

Tenango del Valle

- Huanchaco, Peru

Tepatitlán de Morelos

- Laredo, United States
- Madison, United States
- Ridgecrest, United States

Tepic

- Paramount, United States

Tequila

- Cathedral City, United States
- Chimbarongo, Chile
- Jelenia Góra, Poland
- Jerez de la Frontera, Spain
- Martel, France
- Padre Las Casas, Chile
- Pisco, Peru
- Yauco, Puerto Rico

Tijuana

- Baiyin, China
- Busan, South Korea
- Changchun, China
- Havana, Cuba
- Laredo, United States
- Panjin, China
- San Diego, United States
- Wuhan, China
- Zaragoza, Spain

Tingambato

- Limonar, Cuba

Tizapán El Alto

- Nampa, United States

Tlahualilo

- Laredo, United States

Tlalnepantla de Baz

- Ma'anshan, China
- Ourense, Spain
- La Serena, Chile
- Seville, Spain
- Wichita, United States

Tlaquepaque

- Antigua Guatemala, Guatemala
- Glendale, United States
- Springfield, United States

Tlaxcala de Xicohténcatl

- Medellín, Spain
- Munébrega, Spain
- Salé, Morocco

Toluca

- Caparroso, Spain
- Cartago, Costa Rica
- Debrecen, Hungary
- Fort Worth, United States
- Nanchang, China
- Novi Sad, Serbia
- Ramallah and al-Bireh, Palestine
- Saitama, Japan
- Suwon, South Korea
- La Vega, Dominican Republic

Tonalá

- Brovary, Ukraine
- Laredo, United States

Torreón

- Laredo, United States

Tototlán

- Baldwin Park, United States

Tula de Allende

- Benicia, United States

Tulancingo de Bravo

- Pleasanton, United States

Tultitlán

- Hengshui, China

Tuxpan

- Niquero, Cuba

Tuxtla Gutiérrez

- Amarillo, United States

== U ==
Uruapan

- Antigua Guatemala, Guatemala
- Casma, Peru
- Culver City, United States
- Kansas City, United States
- Madrigal de las Altas Torres, Spain
- Matanzas, Cuba

== V ==
Valladolid

- Asheville, United States

Valle de Zaragoza

- San Elizario, United States

Veracruz

- Cádiz, Spain
- Callao, Peru
- Galveston, United States
- Havana, Cuba
- Laredo, United States
- Miami-Dade County, United States
- Ordes, Spain
- Oviedo, Spain
- Pharr, United States
- Quetzaltenango, Guatemala
- San Jose, United States
- Santos, Brazil
- Seville, Spain
- Tampa, United States
- Valencia, Spain
- Valparaíso, Chile

Victoria de Durango

- Durango, Spain
- Durango, United States
- Franklin Park, United States
- Ningbo, China
- Sacaba, Bolivia
- Vigo, Spain

Villa del Carbón

- Mission, United States

Vista Hermosa

- Jalapa, Nicaragua

== X ==
Xalapa

- Ambato, Ecuador
- Covina, United States
- Omaha, United States

== Z ==
Zacatecas

- Azusa, United States
- Cuenca, Spain
- Eibar, Spain
- Huishan (Wuxi), China
- Jerez de la Frontera, Spain
- Lynwood, United States
- Málaga, Spain
- Oñati, Spain
- La Plata, Argentina
- Tolosa, Spain
- Woodstock, United States

Zapopan

- Antigua Guatemala, Guatemala
- Cartago, Costa Rica
- Changwon, South Korea
- Chengdu, China
- Częstochowa, Poland
- Grand Rapids, United States
- Jinan, China
- Marianao (Havana), Cuba
- Putuo (Shanghai), China
- Rosemead, United States
- Saginaw, United States
- San Pedro Sula, Honduras

Zapotlán el Grande

- Longmont, United States
- Redwood City, United States
- San Felipe, Chile

Zapotlanejo

- Chanco, Chile
- Racine, United States
- San Antonio de los Baños, Cuba

Zihuatanejo de Azueta

- Bensenville, United States
- Collingwood, Canada
- Los Gatos, United States
- McAllen, United States
- Palm Desert, United States

Ziracuaretiro

- Perico, Cuba
