= UANL High school system =

School system in Mexico

Nivel Medio Superior, UANL

Location
- San Nicolás de los Garza; Mexico

District information
- Type: Public High School
- Established: 1933
- President: Alejandro Galván Ramírez

Students and staff
- Colors: Blue & Gold

The UANL High School System consists of 29 public schools in Nuevo León affiliated with the Autonomous University of Nuevo León (Spanish: Universidad Autónoma de Nuevo León, UANL) The high schools have several programs such as the propedeutic baccalaureate, bilingual program, bivalent program in bilingual education, binational program in bilingual education, technical program, and the University Superior Technician degree. Three schools offer technical education, and one school, CIDEB, offers the International Baccalaureate Diploma Programme. Fifteen schools are in the metropolitan area of Monterrey.

== History ==
On May 31, 1933 with the rise of the UANL the Escuela de Bachilleres was established in the Colegio Civil. At that time the Colegio Civil was also used by a law school. Later in 1939, the Nocturn School for Workers (now Preparatoria 3) was founded.

In 1955 the Escuela de Bachilleres was divided into three: Preparatoria 1 in the Colegio Civil, Preparatoria 2 in the neighborhood Mitras, and Preparatoria 3 Nocturn School in the Colegio Civil. Also was renamed the Preparatoria 4 in Linares.

The Escuela de Artes y Labores Pablo Livas was founded in 1921 by Anastasio A. Treviño Martínez. In 1933 it was incorporated to UANL. The Pablo Livas was a girls' school till 1974 when it became co-educational.

The Escuela Industrial Alvaro Obregón was founded in 1930 by Aarón Saénz Garza and was incorporated in 1933 in the UANL. The EIAO had the building in the center of Monterrey and offered mechanical and industrial courses.

Carlos Torres González, principal of Preparatoria 22 in Ciudad Guadalupe, died after being shot and least six times on July 14, 2017. It is unclear if this was a robbery attempt or a targeted murder.

== Schools ==
=== Propedeutic Baccalaurate ===
School	Location	Establishment	Notes
Preparatoria 1	Apodaca	May 31, 1933	
Preparatoria 2	Monterrey	December 12, 1955	
Preparatoria 3	Monterrey		Nocturn for Workers
Preparatoria 4	Linares		
Preparatoria 5	Sabinas Hidalgo	1964	
Preparatoria 6	Montemorelos		
Preparatoria 7	Las Puentes; San Nicolás de los Garza	September 6, 1966	
Preparatoria 7	Oriente; San Nicolás de los Garza	1981	
Preparatoria 8	Guadalupe	1967	
Preparatoria 9	Monterrey	September 2, 1970	
Preparatoria 10	Doctor Arroyo		
Preparatoria 11	Cerralvo		
Preparatoria 12	Cadereyta Jiménez		
Preparatoria 13	Allende		
Preparatoria 14	General Terán		
Preparatoria 15	Florida; Monterrey		
Preparatoria 15	Madero; Monterrey		
Preparatoria 16	Escobedo	September 17, 1974	
Preparatoria 16	San Nicolás de los Garza		
Preparatoria 17	Ciénega de Flores		
Preparatoria 18	Hidalgo		
Preparatoria 19	Villa de García		
Preparatoria 20	Santiago		
Preparatoria 21	China	August 21, 1984	
Preparatoria 22	Guadalupe	September 5, 1975	
Preparatoria 23	San Pedro Garza García		
Preparatoria 23	Santa Catarina, Nuevo León		
Preparatoria 24	Anahuác		
Preparatoria 25; Dr. Eduardo Aguirre Pequeño	Escobedo	September 25, 2005	

=== Technical School ===
School	Location	Establishment	Area
Preparatoria Técnica Médica	Monterrey	August 7, 1974	Medicine
Escuela Industrial Álvaro Obregón	Unidad Churubusco; Monterrey		Technical School
Escuela Industrial Álvaro Obregón	Unidad Tres Caminos; Guadalupe		Technical School
Escuela Industrial Álvaro Obregón	Unidad Santo Domingo; San Nicolás de los Garza		Technical School
Escuela Industrial Álvaro Obregón	Unidad Linares; Linares	January, 2005	Technical School
Escuela Industrial Pablo Livas	Unidad Centro; Monterrey	April 2, 1921	Technical School
Escuela Industrial Pablo Livas	Unidad Poniente; Escobedo	September 24, 1997	Technical School
Centro de Investigación y Desarrollo de Educación Bilingüe (CIDEB)	Monterrey	2000	Bilingual School
