= Numbered highways in Mexico =

State highway system of Mexico

Highways in Mexico are composed of two groups:

- Mexican Federal Highways are built and maintained by the Secretariat of Infrastructure, Communications and Transportation.
- State Highways are built and maintained by the states they are in.

== Shield list ==
=== Federal Highways ===
Mexican Federal Highways

See: Mexican Federal Highway 85

Tolled Mexican Federal Highways

See: Mexican Federal Highway 1D

=== State Highways ===
- Nuevo Leon State Highway 1 Spur
- Nuevo Leon State Highway 58
- Durango state highways
- List of highways in Sonora
- Jalisco State Highway 225
- Sinaloa State Highway 1D
- Tamaulipas State Highway 1
