= Guerrero Municipality, Tamaulipas =

Guerrero
- Municipality
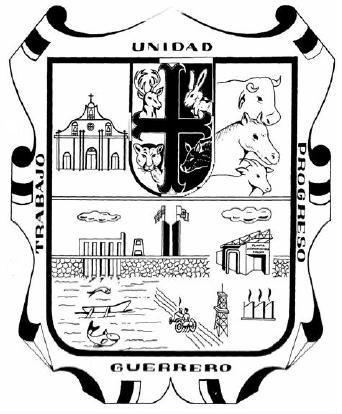
- Coat of arms

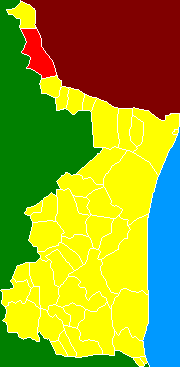
- Municipality of Guerrero in Tamaulipas
- Country: Mexico
- State: Tamaulipas
- Municipal seat: Nueva Ciudad Guerrero

Population (2010)
  - Total: 4,312

Guerrero is a municipality located in the Mexican state of Tamaulipas.

== Towns and villages ==
The largest localities (cities, towns, and villages) are:

Name	2010 Census Population
Nueva Ciudad Guerrero	4,312
La Montura	51
Los González	18
El Nogal	15
La Palma	10
Total Municipality	4,477

== Adjacent municipalities and counties ==
- Mier Municipality - southeast and south
- Parás Municipality, Nuevo León - southwest
- Vallecillo Municipality, Nuevo León - southwest
- Anáhuac Municipality, Nuevo León - west
- Nuevo Laredo Municipality - northwest
- Webb County, Texas - northeast
- Zapata County, Texas - east
- Starr County, Texas - southeast
