= Monterrey metropolitan area =

Monterrey Metropolitan Area
- Metropolitan Area
- Zona Metropolitana de Monterrey (Spanish)
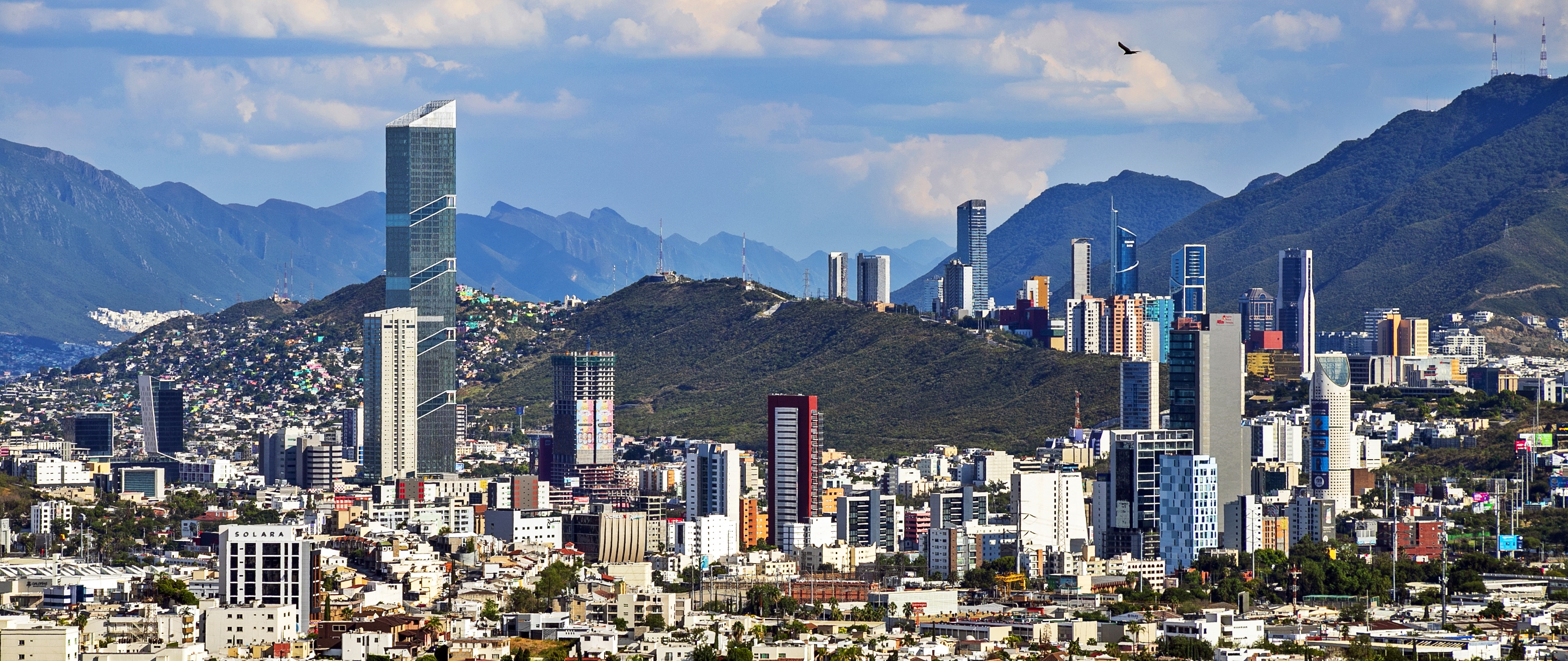
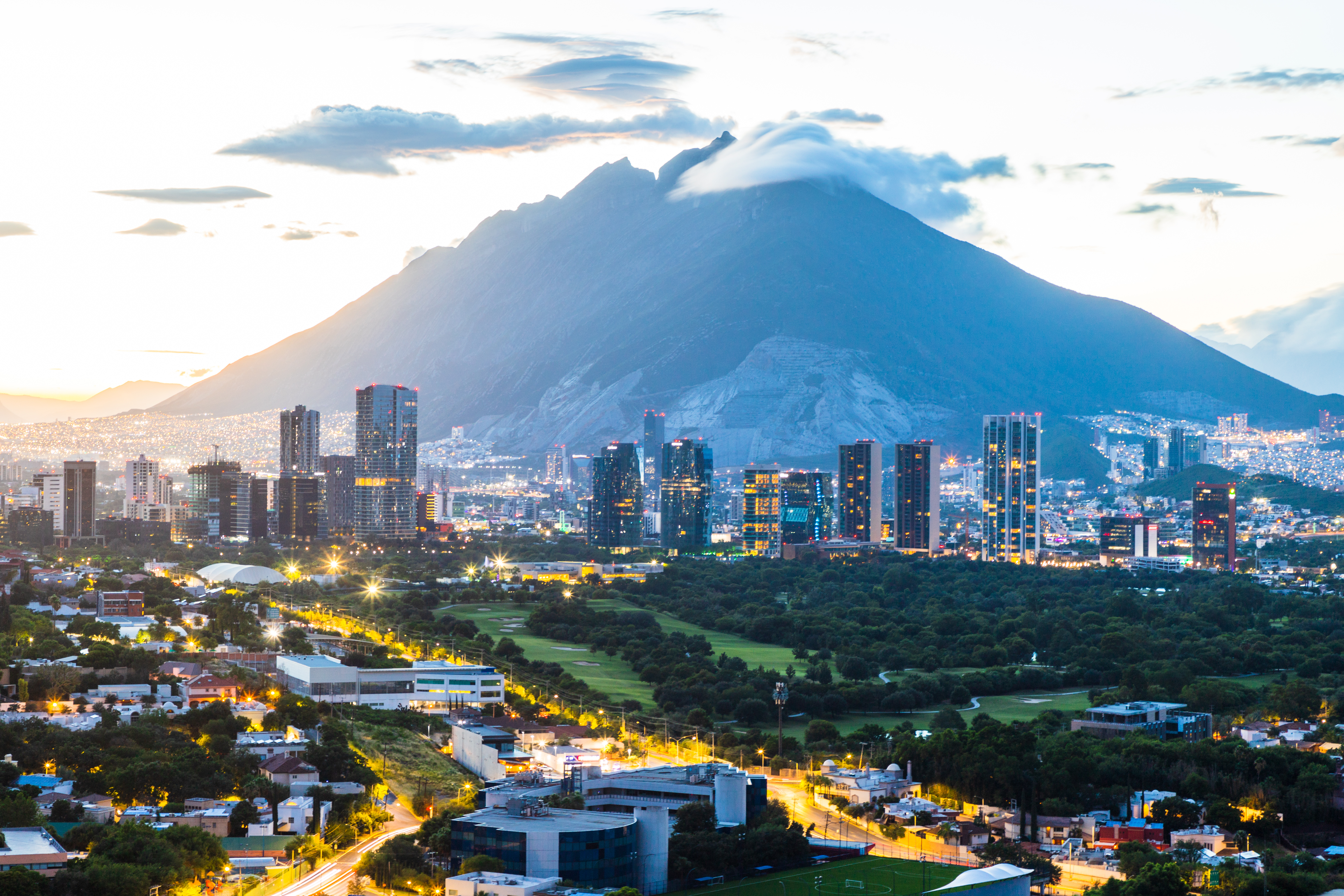
- Aerial view of Monterrey Campestre de Monterrey
Interactive Map of Monterrey Metropolitan Area
City of Monterrey / Ciudad de Monterrey
Monterrey Metro Area / Zona Metropolitana
- Country: Mexico
- State(s): Nuevo Leon
- Largest city: Monterrey
- Other cities: Apodaca; Cadereyta Jiménez; El Carmen; Ciénega de Flores; Garcia; General Escobedo; General Zuazua; Guadalupe; Juárez; Pesquería; Salinas Victoria; San Nicolás de los Garza; San Pedro Garza García; Santa Catarina; Santiago

Area
  - Total: 2,957 sq mi (7,658 km^{2})
- Highest elevation: 4,900 ft (1,500 m)
- Lowest elevation: 1,680 ft (512 m)

Population (2020 census)
  - Total: 5,341,177
  - Rank: 2nd
  - Density: 1,806/sq mi (697.5/km^{2})

GDP (PPP, constant 2015 values)
  - Year: 2023
  - Total: $190.3 billion
  - Per capita: $37,210
- Time zone: UTC−06:00 (Zona Centro)
- Area code: +52 81

The Monterrey metropolitan area (Spanish: Área Metropolitana de la Ciudad de Monterrey), also known as Greater Monterrey, is a conurbation in the northeastern Mexican state of Nuevo León, centered on the city of Monterrey. It is the second-largest metropolitan area in Mexico by population, with an estimated 5,341,177 inhabitants as of 2020. The region serves as a major industrial and economic hub for the country.

== Overview ==
The Monterrey metropolitan area is composed of the municipalities/cities of:

- Apodaca
- Cadereyta Jiménez
- El Carmen
- Escobedo
- García
- Guadalupe
- Juárez
- Monterrey
- Salinas Victoria
- San Nicolás de los Garza
- San Pedro Garza García
- Santa Catarina
- Santiago

There are three adjacent towns that do not maintain continuous urban development with the core urban area. These towns are considered strategic as the metropolitan area grows and integrates them:

- Ciénega de Flores
- General Zuazua
- Pesquería

== See also ==
- Metropolitan areas of Mexico
