= 13th federal electoral district of Nuevo León =

Federal electoral district of Mexico

Nuevo León's 13th
- Electoral district of the Chamber of Deputies of Mexico

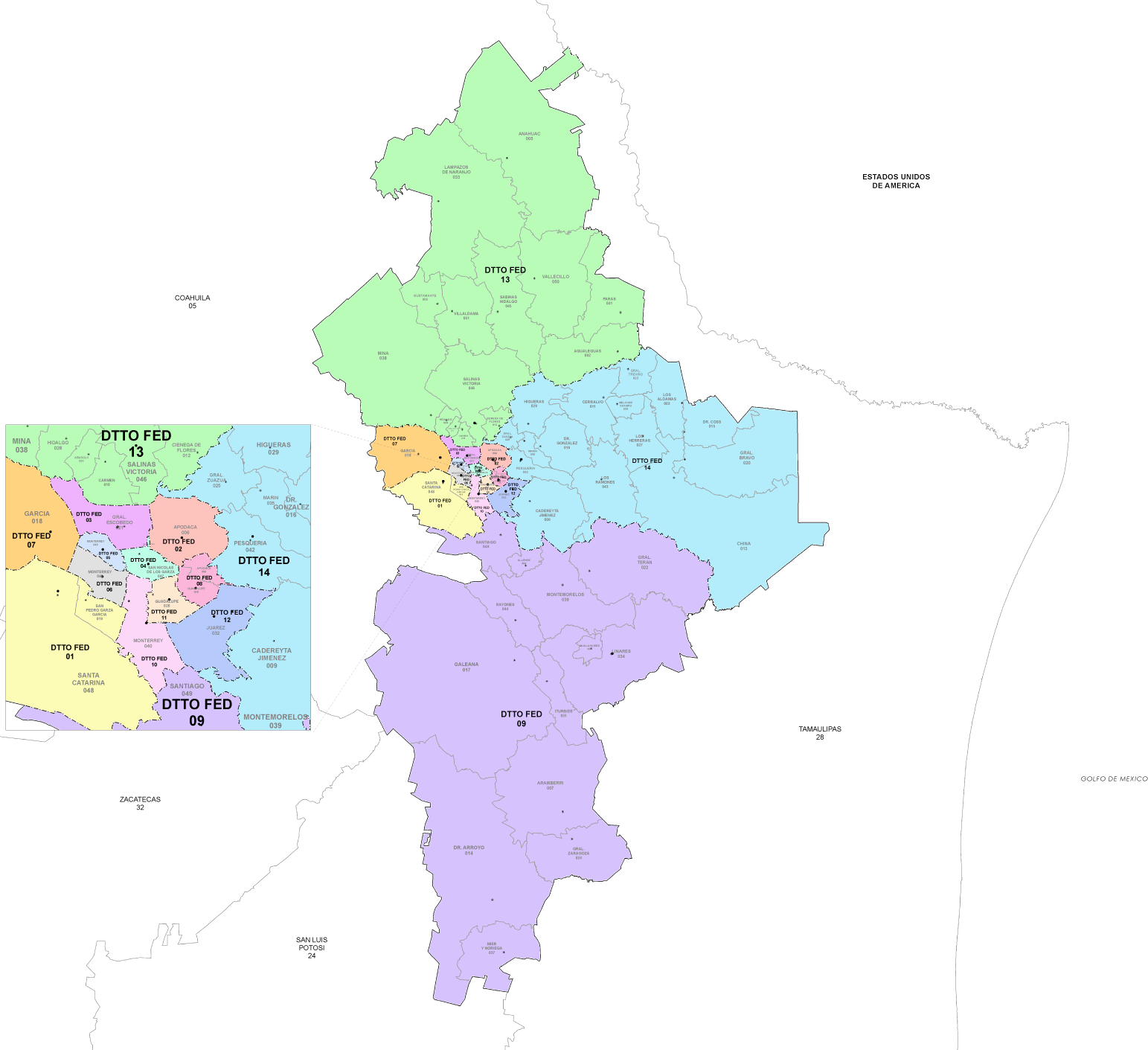
- 13th district

Incumbent
- Member: Luis Orlando Quiroga Treviño
- Party: ▌Ecologist Green Party
- Congress: 66th (2024–2027)

District
- State: Nuevo León
- Head town: Salinas Victoria
- Coordinates: 25°58′N 100°18′W
- Covers: 14 municipalities: Abasolo, Agualeguas, Anáhuac, Bustamante, Ciénaga de Flores, El Carmen, Hidalgo, Lampazos de Naranjo, Mina, Parás, Sabinas Hidalgo, Salinas Victoria, Vallecillo, Villaldama
- PR region: Second
- Precincts: 145
- Population: 374,769 (2020 census)

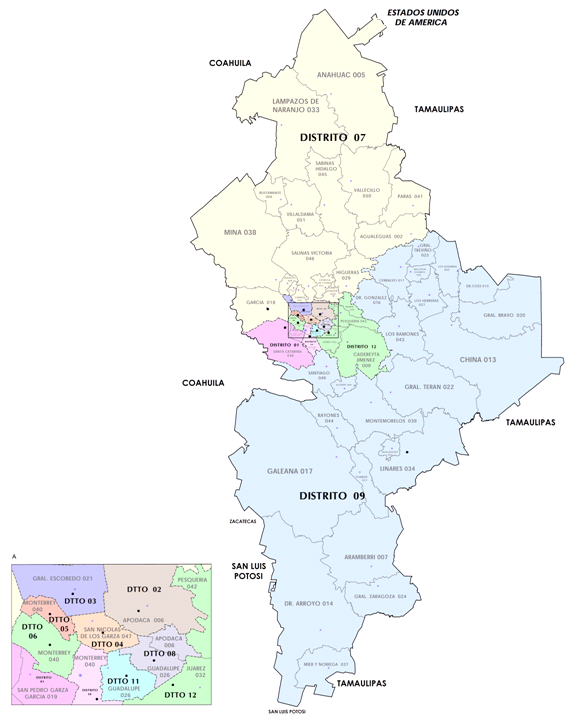
Nuevo León's districts in 2017–2022

The 13th federal electoral district of Nuevo León (Spanish: Distrito electoral federal 13 de Nuevo León) is one of the 300 electoral districts into which Mexico is divided for elections to the federal Chamber of Deputies and one of 14 such districts in the state of Nuevo León.

It elects one deputy to the lower house of Congress for each three-year legislative session by means of the first-past-the-post system. Votes cast in the district also count towards the calculation of proportional representation ("plurinominal") deputies elected from the second region.

The 13th and 14th districts were established by the National Electoral Institute (INE) in its 2021–2023 redistricting process and elected their first deputies in the 2024 general election. The inaugural member for the 13th district is Luis Orlando Quiroga Treviño of the Ecologist Green Party of Mexico (PVEM).

== District territory ==
Evolution of electoral district numbers
	1974	1978	1996	2005	2017	2023
Nuevo León	7	11	11	12	12	14
Chamber of Deputies	196	300				

Under the INE's 2023 districting plan, which is to be used for the 2024, 2027 and 2030 federal elections, the new 13th district covers 145 electoral precincts (secciones electorales) across 14 of the state's northern municipalities:

- Abasolo, Agualeguas, Anáhuac, Bustamante, Ciénaga de Flores, El Carmen, Hidalgo, Lampazos de Naranjo, Mina, Parás, Sabinas Hidalgo, Salinas Victoria, Vallecillo and Villaldama.

The head town (cabecera distrital), where results from individual polling stations are gathered together and tallied, is the city of Salinas Victoria. The district reported a population of 374,769 in the 2020 census.

== Deputies returned to Congress ==
(Mexico) National parties
- Current
- PAN
- PRI
- PT
- PVEM
- MC
- Morena
- PAZ
- Somos
- Defunct or local only
- PLM
- PNR
- PRM
- PNM
- PP
- PPS
- PARM
- PFCRN
- CON
- PANAL
- PSD
- PES
- PES
- PRD

Nuevo León's 13th district
Election	Deputy	Party	Term	Legislature
2024	Luis Orlando Quiroga Treviño	Ecologist Green Party of Mexico	2024–2027	66th Congress

== Presidential elections ==
Nuevo León's 13th district
Election	District won by	Party or coalition	%
2024	Claudia Sheinbaum Pardo	Sigamos Haciendo Historia	55.4745
