= Villaldama, Nuevo León =

Villaldama
- Municipality and town
- Location within Nuevo León Location within Mexico
- Coordinates: 26°30′N 100°26′W
- Country: Mexico
- State: Nuevo León
- Municipal seat: Ciudad Villaldama

Government
  - Mayor: Luis Eduardo Sepúlveda de León (MC)
  - Federal electoral district: Nuevo León's 13th

Area
  - Total: 860.9 km^{2} (332.4 sq mi)

Population (2020 census)
  - Total: 3,573
- Time zone: UTC-6 (Zona Centro)

Villaldama is a municipality in the state of Nuevo Leon, Mexico extending over 870.5 km^{2} (336.1 sq mi). Ciudad Villaldama is its principal town and seat of government. It is located in the northern part of the state, coordinates 26° 30' N and 100° 25' W, with an elevation of 420 m above sea level. It limits to the north with the municipality of Lampazos de Naranjo and to the south with Salinas Victoria; to the east with Sabinas Hidalgo and the west with Bustamante. It is located approximately 96 km from Monterrey, the state capital. Villaldama is a town in Mexico, located in Nuevo León. The locality had its maximum development when its name was Real of Mines of San Pedro Mouth of Lions, during the mining splendor of the New Kingdom of León towards 1690, its current name is due to the hero of the Independence of Mexico: Juan Aldama, and it changed in the year 1812.

== Population ==
Per the 2020 INEGI census, there were 3,573 people living in the municipality of Villadama, of which 1,787 were male and 1,786 were female.

== Geography ==
It Is located in the northern part of the state, at coordinates 100° 25' longitude West and 26° 30' north latitude, at a height of 420 meters above sea level. It is Confined to the north by the municipality of Mops de Naranjo and to the south by Salinas Victoria; To the east with Sabinas Hidalgo and to the west with Bustamante. Its approximate distance to the capital of the state is 96 km. The way to arrive is to travel the Road Colombia of the State of Nuevo León.

== Climate ==
The climate is extreme and arid, with high temperatures and low precipitation. The mean annual temperature is 25 °C. Summer temperatures range from 39 to 43 °C. Winter temperatures can reach -4 °C. Average annual precipitation is 500 mm. However, rainfall can be as high as 750 mm during rainy periods and as low as 340 mm during dry seasons.

== History ==
The northern region of the state is inhabited the aboriginal groups known as the Alazapas, Toboso Apache and Catapaches. Colonization in the north of the state was slower than in other states of the country. The Spaniards tried to colonize at the end of the eighteenth century and was rejected by the aboriginal peoples. This corresponds to the Tlaxcalans coming from the center of the country to facilitate the colonization and the founding of towns like that of San Miguel de Aguayo of the New Tlaxcala, today Bustamante; The Real of San Pedro de Boca de Leones, today Villaldama; The Real of Santiago of the Sabinas, today Sabinas Hidalgo; And the Mission of Our Lady of Sorrows of the Point of Lampazas of Naranjo. In 1690 the Real San Pedro de Boca de Leones was founded by Captain Juan de Villarreal, Francisco de Bobarbarigoo and Tlaxcala Antonio Gonzalez who discovered the first mines in the Valley of Boca de Leones.

By consolidating the triumph of independence changed the political life of the country and what was the new Kingdom of León the State of Nuevo León was created. The Real went to the political category of Villa on 17 March 1828. In 1830 of new account the Old Mines were exploited by Don Darío Guerrero, from where he obtained the silver he gave to frame the painting of the Virgin of Guadalupe in the temple of the same name.

The armed Struggle of 1910 barely lasted six months, and mining continued normally. Between The years 1914 and 1918 in the Hacienda of Guadalupe were built four vertical kilns and three of rotation, and in Old Mines a vertical oven was installed. The mining production was focused on silver and zinc. Minas Viejas is located in the Sierra of the same name. During the revolutionary movement, a bout was recorded, which is remembered for being very bloody, on 3 May 1913. The revolutionary troops were in command of the Lord Jesus Carranza, who triumphed over the federal troops under the command of Colonel Villanueva.

Currently, the Rancho Minas Viejas is owned by Don Pedro Elizaldi Cantu, who worked as a miner in these properties more than 40 years ago, and who 20 years ago was one of the mayors of Lampazas de Naranjo, Nuevo León.

== Tourism ==
Villaldama has architectural attractions such as The Municipal Palace, a classic colonial building built between 1906 and 1907. The Church of Our Lady of Guadalupe shows the architectural style of the sixteenth century. The Ancient Temple of St. Peter The Apostle, of rustic construction and currently used as an outdoor experimental theatre. The Hermitage of the Holy Cross located at 300 meters from the municipal head, the only church in the state with a complete Viacrucis in its staircase, known for its inhabitants as The Hermitage of La Loma from where you can see all of Villaldama Rancho Real de Minas Viejas, oriented to the preservation, conservation and reproduction of flora and fauna, located in an important mining area, where silver, lead and gold were exploited near the end of the seventeenth century. Activities such as mine exploration, mountain biking, bird watching, astronomy and photographic safari can be carried out. Additionally, a viewpoint known as "Volcano of the Air" from which you can see an impressive landscape.

The locality has four lodging centres: Hotel María Luisa, Hotel Aurora, Hotel Villa Alreta, and the Rancho Real de Minas Viejas.

== Culture ==
The Municipal Museum exhibits antiques of the region and photographs that show the transformation of the village over the years. It also has a space for pictorial exhibitions and a multipurpose room and is located on the side of the Church of Our Lady of Guadalupe.

=== Gastronomy ===
The Municipality of Villaldama is famous for the number of good bakeries it has had throughout its history. Throughout the municipality they find a wide variety of bakeries, which still use traditional stone ovens, where you can buy empanadas (pumpkin, pineapple, caramel, among others), volcanoes, Coyotas, hojarascas, among other pieces of bread.

=== Popular Fiestas ===
Feria de la Santa Cruz: 26 April through 3 May.

=== Notable people ===
Some notable people originating in Villaldama are: baseball player: Epitacio "La Mala " Torres and the lawyer and former Senator of the Republic, Ángel Santos Cervantes, among others.

David Carrillo González, (Villaldama, Nuevo León 29 October 1920, State of Mexico, 16 December 2015.). Dean of the Mexican caricature, he has been president and Founding Partner of the Mexican Society of Caricaturists; Thanks to his vision the Museum of the Caricature is created and a showcase contains his work and personal objects. The Founders ' Hall bears its name. His work has been disseminated in newspapers of greater circulation such as Universal, Excelsior and the Sun of Mexico. In Television He worked in Duel of Cartoonists, alternating with Cabral, Freyre and Isaac. He Has exhibited throughout the Mexican Republic and in cities in the United States. He has eight books published. In 1939 he made his first cover in Magazines Magazine; then he collaborated in the newspapers The Universal Illustrated and The Afternoon where he began as a political caricaturist. In 1945 Carrillo paints a large format box commissioned by the Pan American Legion, in which he captured among others the figures of George Washington, José Martí, Hidalgo, Morelos, Juárez, Chian-Kai-Chek, De Gaulle, Manuel Ávila, Camacho, Roosevelt, etc. This work was titled "Continental Fraternity" was given to then President Roosevelt, by the Government of Mexico and the Pan American Legion.

Carillo’s caricatures employ a language that is simultaneously kind and sharp—and accessible to everyone. The satire and parody in his political cartoons have provided an opportunity to view the historical unfolding of national life through a more critical and detailed lens.

== Main population centers ==
The municipality of Villaldama has 43 population centers, the principal ones being:

Name	Population (2020)	Note
Ciudad de Villaldama	2,578	Municipal seat, located 96 km from Monterrey
El Potrero	496	Located 12 km from Ciudad de Villaldama
Hacienda Santa Fe	126	Located 5 km from Ciudad de Villaldama
