= Nuevo Leon State Highway 58 =

Highway in Nuevo Leon, Mexico

State Highway 58
- Carretera estatal 58

Major junctions
- East end: Morales, Nuevo Leon
- Fed. 85; Fed. 85D
- West end: El Merendero, Nuevo Leon

Location
- Country: Mexico
- State: Nuevo León

Highway system
- Mexican Federal Highways; List; Autopistas

Nuevo Leon State Highway 58 ( NL 58 ) is a two-lane Nuevo Leon state highway. The highway connects Morales, Nuevo Leon with El Merendero, Nuevo Leon.
