= Isaac Alarcón =

Mexican-born American football player (born 1998)

No. 67 – San Francisco 49ers
- Position: Offensive tackle
- Roster status: Practice squad

Personal information
- Born: July 27, 1998 (age 28); Monterrey, Nuevo León, Mexico
- Listed height: 6 ft 7 in (2.01 m)
- Listed weight: 320 lb (145 kg)

Career information
- High school: UANL High School No. 9 (Monterrey)
- College: ITESM (2016-2019)
- NFL draft: 2020: undrafted
- CFL draft: 2021G: 3rd round, 25th overall pick

Career history
- Dallas Cowboys (2020–2023)*; San Francisco 49ers (2024–present)
- * Offseason or practice squad member only

Awards and highlights
- CONADEIP All-Star (2019)
- Stats at Pro Football Reference

Isaac Alarcón
Medal record

Men's American football

Representing Mexico

World U-19 Championship
Bronze medal – third place	2016 China	Team

Isaac Alarcón García (born July 27, 1998) is a Mexican professional American football offensive tackle for the San Francisco 49ers of the National Football League (NFL). He played college football at the Monterrey Institute of Technology (ITESM) and joined the Dallas Cowboys in 2020 as a part of the league's International Player Pathway Program.

== Early life ==
Alarcón first started playing football at age 14 years old at Club Pumas, a youth football club, then attended the UANL High School No. 9 in Monterrey, Mexico. He accepted a football scholarship from the Monterrey Institute of Technology and Higher Education (ITESM). He played as a right and left tackle. In 2019, he contributed to ITESM winning the Mexican college football national championship.

In 2016, he was in the Mexico national team that earned a bronze medal in the U19 World Championship in China.

== Professional career ==
=== Dallas Cowboys ===
Alarcón was allocated to the Dallas Cowboys on April 27, 2020. He was part of the NFL's International Player Pathway Program that allowed him to train for two months alongside NFL players and draft hopefuls at the IMG Academy after being selected from an international combine held in Germany in October 2019. Alarcón was waived by Dallas on September 5, and re-signed to the practice squad the following day. He signed a reserve/future contract with the Cowboys on January 4, 2021.

Alarcón was selected by the Calgary Stampeders in the third round of the 2021 CFL global draft on April 15, 2021. On August 31, Alarcón was waived by the Cowboys and re-signed to the practice squad the next day. His roster exemption was kept for the 2021 season. He signed a reserve/future contract with the Cowboys on January 18, 2022.

On August 30, 2022, Alarcón was waived by the Cowboys and signed to the practice squad the next day. On January 26, 2023, Alarcón signed a reserve/future contract with the Cowboys.

In 2023, Alarcón reportedly changed his position from an offensive tackle to a defensive tackle. He was waived as part of final roster cuts on August 29, 2023.

=== San Francisco 49ers ===
On January 23, 2024, Alarcón was signed by the San Francisco 49ers to a reserve/future contract. He was waived on August 27, and re-signed to the practice squad.

Alarcón signed a reserve/future contract with San Francisco on January 7, 2025. On April 16, Alarcón was suspended for six games for violating the NFL's performance-enhancing substances policy. He was waived on October 13 and re-signed to the practice squad the next day.

On January 20, 2026, Alarcón signed a reserve/futures contract with San Francisco. On August 30, Alarcón was waived by the 49ers as a part of final roster cuts; he was re-signed to the team's practice squad the next day.
