= Tamaulipas State Highway 1 =

Highway in Tamaulipas, Mexico

State Highway 1
- Carretera estatal 1

Route information
- Length: 40 km (25 mi)

Major junctions
- East end: Nuevo Laredo
- Fed. 2 in Nuevo Laredo; Fed. 85 in Nuevo Laredo; SH 1 in Nuevo León
- West end: Nuevo León border

Location
- Country: Mexico
- State: Tamaulipas
- Major cities: Nuevo Laredo, San Vincente

Highway system
- Mexican Federal Highways; List; Autopistas

Tamaulipas State Highway 1 ( TAL 1 ) is a highway that runs from Nuevo Laredo, Tamaulipas Mexico west to Nuevo Leon State Highway 1 ( NL 1 ) on the Nuevo Leon / Tamaulipas borderline. This highway with its Nuevo Leon side connects Nuevo Laredo with Anáhuac, Nuevo Leon.
