= Del Norte International Airport =

Airport serving Monterrey, Nuevo León, Mexico

Monterrey-Del Norte International Airport Aeropuerto Internacional Del Norte
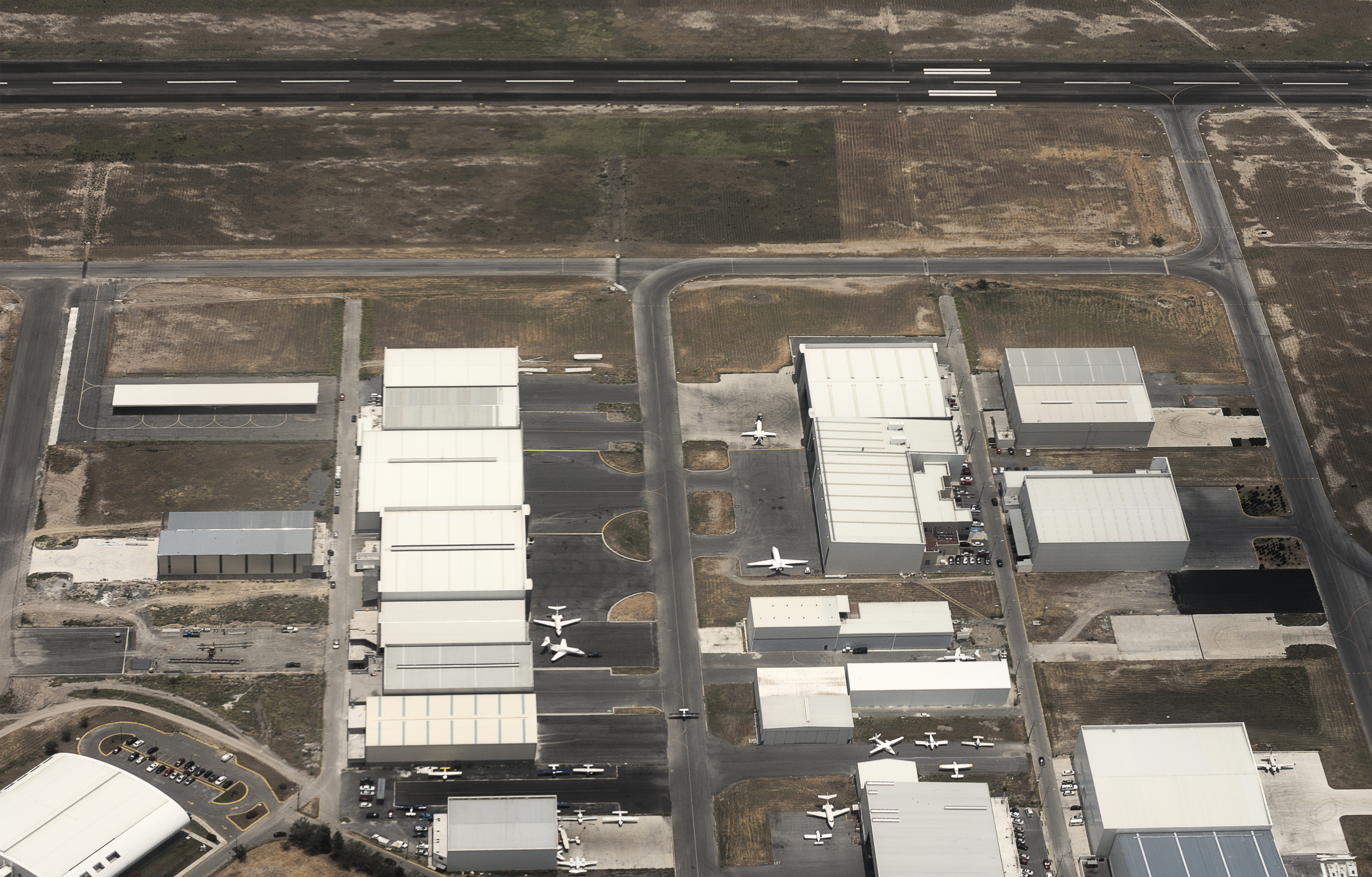
- IATA: NTR; ICAO: MMAN

Summary
- Airport type: Public
- Operator: Olmeca-Maya-Mexica
- Serves: Monterrey Metropolitan Area
- Location: Apodaca, Nuevo León, Mexico
- Opened: 1942
- Time zone: CST (UTC-06:00)
- Elevation AMSL: 1,470 ft / 448 m
- Coordinates: 25°51′56″N 100°14′17″W
- Website: adelnorte.com.mx/eng/index.html

Map
- Location of the airport in Nuevo León NTR (Mexico)

Runways
Direction	Length		Surface
Direction	m	ft	Surface
02/20	2,011	6,598	Asphalt
11/29	1,538	5,046	Asphalt

Statistics (2025)
- Total passengers: 41,599
- Ranking in Mexico: 54th ▼1
- Source: Agencia Federal de Aviación Civil

Monterrey-Del Norte International Airport (Spanish: Aeropuerto Internacional del Norte) (IATA: NTR, ICAO: MMAN) is an international airport situated in Apodaca, Nuevo León, Mexico. It serves as a secondary airport for Greater Monterrey, handling flight training, executive, and general aviation activities, while also accommodating research and military facilities. The airport is under the operation of Complejo Aeronáutico del Norte and does not offer scheduled passenger public flights. The nearest airport that serves commercial flights is Monterrey International Airport, located 16 kilometres (9.9 mi) to the southwest of Del Norte Airport.

Established by American Airlines in the 1940s to meet the demand for air service to Monterrey, Del Norte Airport played a crucial role in early aviation in the region. However, due to various incidents related to arrival procedures and the need for enhanced capabilities, it was decided to build Monterrey International Airport which later replaced Del Norte in 1970. Despite this transition, remnants of Del Norte's history persist in the form of visible artifacts, such as old American Airlines letters found inside certain hangars.

== Facilities ==
The airport is situated at an elevation of 448 metres (1,470 ft) above mean sea level and features two asphalt runways. Runway 02/20 is 2,011 metres (6,598 ft)with an ILS/DME, and Runway 11/29 is 1,538 metres (5,046 ft) long. The airport features 123 hangars, a control tower, a small terminal featuring facilities for arrival and departure charter or commercial flights, and multiple aprons catering to general aviation. The airport has 200 active members. Its facilities house 300 aircraft, and more than 2,000 people work directly or indirectly at this location.

In addition to its aviation services, the airport hosts the Research Center for Innovation in Aeronautical Engineering, an integral part of the Faculty of Mechanical and Electrical Engineering at the Autonomous University of Nuevo León. This center is composed primarily of state-of-the-art laboratories designed to conduct research in various areas related to aeronautical engineering.

Air Force Base No. 14 (Spanish: Base Aérea Militar No. 14 Apodaca, Nuevo León) (B.A.M. 14) is located on the airport premises. It is the headquarters of Air Squadron 108, which operates Cessna 182 and Cessna 206 aircraft, as well as Air Squadron 102, which operates Bell 206 and Bell 212 aircraft. The base is equipped with a 22,350 square metres (240,600 sq ft) apron, a hangar, and accommodation for Air Force personnel.

== See also ==
- List of the busiest airports in Mexico
- List of airports in Mexico
- List of airports by ICAO code: M
- List of busiest airports in North America
- List of the busiest airports in Latin America
- Transportation in Mexico
- Tourism in Mexico
- Monterrey International Airport
- List of Mexican military installations
- Mexican Air Force
