= Grutas de Bustamante =

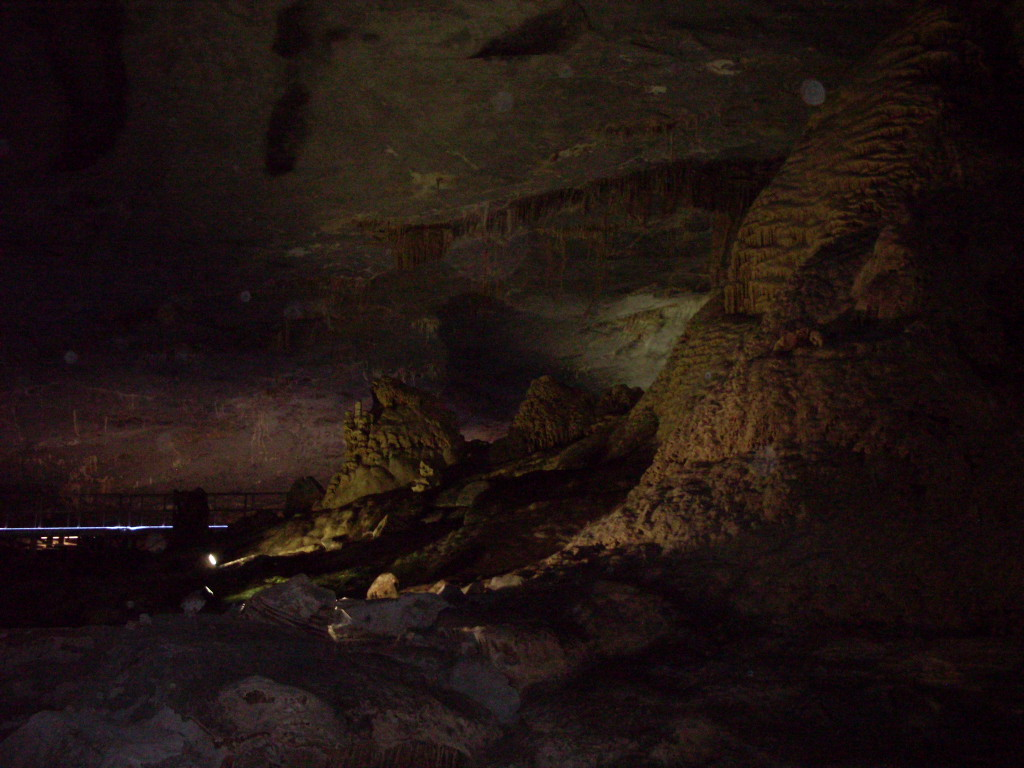
- Interactive map of Grutas de Bustamante
- Location: Bustamante Municipality, Nuevo León, Mexico
- Coordinates: 26°30′02″N 100°31′36″W
- Discovery: 1906
- Geology: Limestone
- Entrances: 1
- Translation: Bustamante Caves (Spanish)

Grutas de Bustamante (Bustamante Caves), also known as Palmito Caves, are a group of natural caves located in the municipality of Bustamante, Nuevo Leon. The caves are located in an entrance of the mountains known as Sierra de Gomas, the Bustamante caves are located 107 kilometers northwest outside Monterrey and 7 kilometers southwest Bustamante municipal seat.

== History ==
The geologic formation that the caves formed in is thought to have formed between 50 and 60 million years ago. During the prehistoric era, the caves were submerged in sea water that is the reason marine fossils like sea shells and snail shells can be seen on the cave walls. Bustamante caves like the García caves which were discovered a few years earlier, remained hidden for thousands of years until 1906. The discovery of the Bustamante caves was in 1906 when a local peasant was looking for palmito plant in the Gomas mountains, when he realized there was a small hole in the top of the mountain, so he decided to dig until he could go into a cave and to his surprise he found a wide variety of stalactites and stalagmites inside.
