= Mexican Federal Highway 85 =

Highway in Mexico

Federal Highway 85
- Carretera federal 85

Route information
- Maintained by Secretariat of Infrastructure, Communications and Transportation
- Length: 1,213 km (754 mi)
- Existed: July 1, 1936–present

Major junctions
- South end: Fed. 95 in Mexico City
- Fed. 130 in Pachuca; Fed. 120 in Ciudad Valles; Fed. 101 in Ciudad Victoria; Fed. 40 in Monterrey
- North end: I-35 BL at the Gateway to the Americas International Bridge at the U.S.-Mexico Border in Nuevo Laredo

Location
- Country: Mexico

Highway system
- Mexican Federal Highways; List; Autopistas
← Fed. 84	→ Fed. 85D

Federal Highway 85 (Spanish: Carretera Federal 85) connects Mexico City with the Mexico–United States border at Nuevo Laredo, Tamaulipas. Highway 85 runs through Monterrey, Nuevo León; Ciudad Victoria, Tamaulipas; Ciudad Valles, San Luis Potosí; and Pachuca, Hidalgo. It ends at the intersection of Highway 95 in the San Pedro area of Mexico City. Highway 85 is the original route of the Pan-American Highway from the border to the capital as well as the Inter-American Highway.

Through most of Tamaulipas and Nuevo León, it is a freeway and is essentially a southern continuation of U.S. Interstate 35. Highway 85 has two alternate toll routes (Autopistas); both are named Carretera Federal 85D; one is from Nuevo Laredo to Monterrey (123.1 kilometers MXN$177) and Pachuca to Mexico City (45.8 kilometers MXN$33). Highway 85D has wider lanes, offers a more direct route, and is continuously being repaired and repaved.

== Description ==
=== Nuevo Laredo, Tamaulipas, to Monterrey, Nuevo León ===
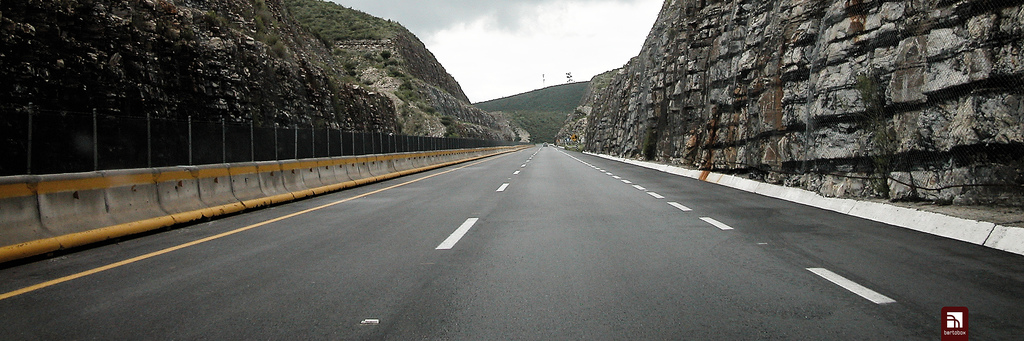
Carretera federal 85 as it crosses the Paso de Mamulique between Nuevo Laredo and Monterrey

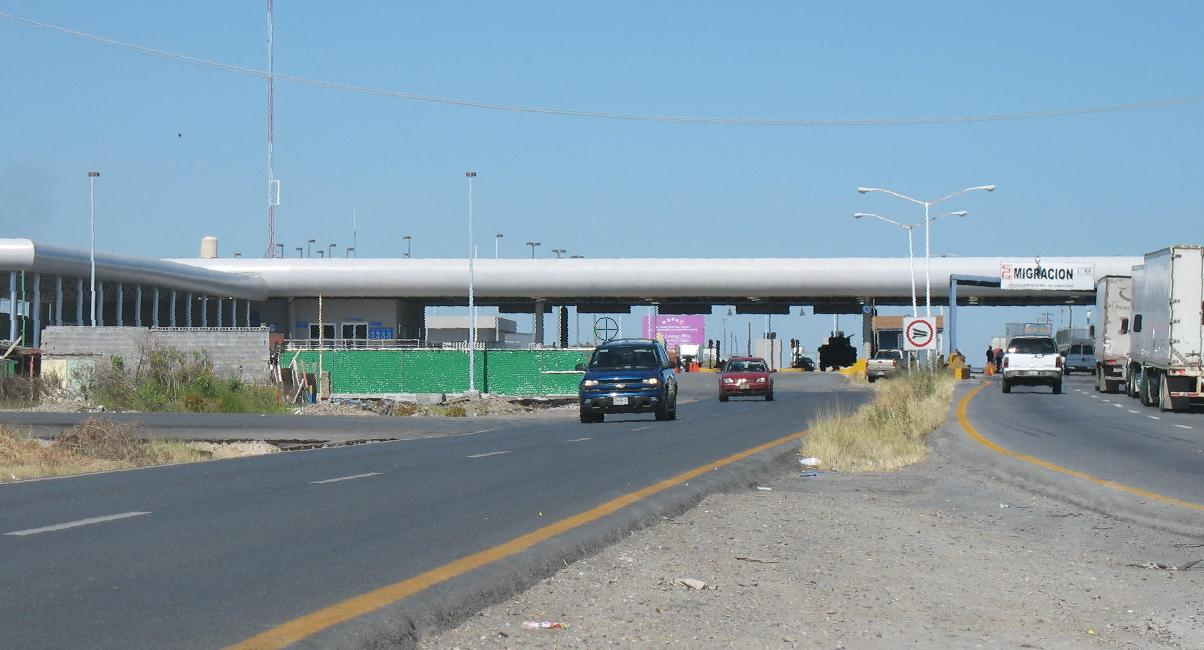
Garita Kilómetro 26

Federal Highway 85 is a 6-lane divided unrestricted access road from Nuevo Laredo to Monterrey. Gateway to the Americas International Bridge in Nuevo Laredo is the highway's starting point. In Nuevo Laredo MFH 85 is also known as Reforma Avenue passing through Downtown Nuevo Laredo and Nuevo Laredo's main commercial districts and Industrial Parks. At kilometer 26 there is a Mexican customs stop known as Garita Kilómetro 26. All vehicles exiting the border area are required to stop for inspection and proof of citizenship is required. The highway is divided into Highway 85 (known as la libre; the "free road") and the toll Highway 85D (known as la cuota) whose starting point at the World Trade International Bridge in Nuevo Laredo then connects with MFH85 then splitting again after the Mexican check point. At about midway between Nuevo Laredo and Monterrey, Highway 85 crosses the Sierra Madre Oriental mountain range (at the Paso de Mamulique). Highway 85 passes through several cities and small towns including:

- Nuevo Laredo
- Sabinas Hidalgo
- Salinas Victoria
- Escobedo
- San Nicolás de los Garza
- Monterrey

=== Monterrey, Nuevo León to Ciudad Victoria, Tamaulipas ===
Federal Highway 85 in Monterrey is mainly a 6-lane divided unrestricted access road. In Monterrey the highway intersects various highways and loops. At the southern end it becomes a 4-lane divided highway leading to Linares, Nuevo León. From Linares to Ciudad Victoria the highway becomes a 2-lane road. Highway 85 passes through several cities and small towns including:

- Montemorelos
- Linares
- Allende
- Santiago
- Villagrán
- Hidalgo
- Ciudad Victoria

=== Ciudad Victoria, Tamulipas to Ciudad Mante, Tamaulipas ===
Federal Highway 85 is a 2-lane divided highway from Ciudad Victoria to Ciudad Mante, Tamaulipas. Highway 85 passes through mainly rural areas.

=== Ciudad Mante, Tamaulipas to Ciudad Valles, San Luis Potosí ===
Federal Highway 85 is a 2-lane divided highway from Ciudad Mante, Tamaulipas to Ciudad Valles, San Luis Potosí. Highway 85 passes through mainly rural areas.

=== Ciudad Valles, San Luis Potosí to Pachuca, Hidalgo ===
Federal Highway 85 is a 2-lane divided highway from Ciudad Valles, San Luis Potosí to Actopan, Hidalgo. From Actopan to Pachuca, Hidalgo it becomes a 4-lane divided highway. Highway 85 passes through several cities and small towns including:

- Tamazunchale
- Axtla de Terrazas
- Ixmiquilpan
- Actopan
- Pachuca

=== Pachuca, Hidalgo to Mexico City ===
Federal Highway 85 is a 4-lane divided highway from Pachuca, Hidalgo to Mexico City. Highway 85 passes through several cities and small towns including:

- Villanueva
- Ecatepec
- Teotihuacán de Arista
- Mexico City

== Junction list ==
State	Location	Road(s)	Notes
Tamaulipas	Nuevo Laredo	Gateway to the Americas International Bridge and SH 359 / US 83 / I-35 at the United States border	Northern End
Tamaulipas	Nuevo Laredo	Mexican Federal Highway 2	
Tamaulipas	Nuevo Laredo	Tamaulipas State Highway 1	
Tamaulipas	Nuevo Laredo	Mexican Federal Highway 85D	Alternate Toll Route
Nuevo León	Monterrey	Mexican Federal Highway 85D	Alternate Toll Route
Nuevo León	Monterrey	Mexican Federal Highway 53	
Nuevo León	Monterrey	Mexican Federal Highway 54	
Nuevo León	Monterrey	Mexican Federal Highway 40	
Nuevo León	Montemorelos	Mexican Federal Highway 35	
Tamaulipas	Ciudad Victoria	Mexican Federal Highway 101	
Tamaulipas	Llera	Mexican Federal Highway 81	
Tamaulipas	Ciudad Mante	Mexican Federal Highway 80	
San Luis Potosí	Ciudad Valles	Mexican Federal Highway 120	
Hidalgo	Ixmiquilpan	Mexican Federal Highway 45	
Hidalgo	Pachuca	Mexican Federal Highway 130	
Hidalgo	Pachuca	Mexican Federal Highway 85D	Alternate Toll Route
Mexico	Ecatepec de Morelos	Mexican Federal Highway 85D	Alternate Toll Route
Mexico	Ecatepec de Morelos	Mexican Federal Highway 132	
Distrito Federal	Mexico City	Mexican Federal Highway 95	Southern End

== See also ==
- List of Mexican Federal Highways
- List of Mexican autopistas
