= Vallecillo Municipality =

Town in Nuevo León, Mexico

Vallecillo
- Municipality and town
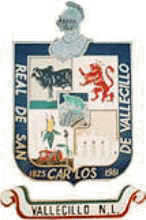
- Coat of arms

- Location within Nuevo León Location within Mexico
- Coordinates: 26°39′N 99°59′W
- Country: Mexico
- State: Nuevo León
- Municipal seat: Vallecillo

Government
  - Federal electoral district: Nuevo León's 13th

Area
  - Total: 1,823 km^{2} (704 sq mi)
- Elevation: 266 m (873 ft)

Population (2010)
  - Total: 622
- Time zone: UTC-6 (Zona Centro)

Vallecillo is a municipality located in the state of Nuevo León, in northeastern Mexico.

== Geography ==
This municipality is located within the coordinates 26º40' latitude north, 99º58' longitude west; it has a 274-metre altitude 274 on the North American Great Plains. It borders the municipality of Anáhuac and Lampazos de Naranjo to north, Parás to east, Sabinas Hidalgo to west and Agualeguas to south.

== Administrative division ==
The municipal seat is Vallecillo just like other municipalities in the state of Nuevo León where the municipal seat has the same name than the municipality itself. Vallecillo is one of the least populated municipalities in Nuevo León, other settlements in Vallecillo are San Carlos, Matatenas, Colorados de Abajo, Colorados de Arriba, Palo Alto, El Ayaleño and El Álamo.

== Economy ==
The main economic activities are agriculture and cattle, being the latter of great importance as in the community of San Carlos is located the headquarters of the Livestock Development Regional Center of Vallecillo (Centro Regional de Fomento Ganadero de Vallecillo) administrated by the Universidad Autónoma de Nuevo León.
