= Bustamante, Nuevo León =

Bustamante
- Municipality and town

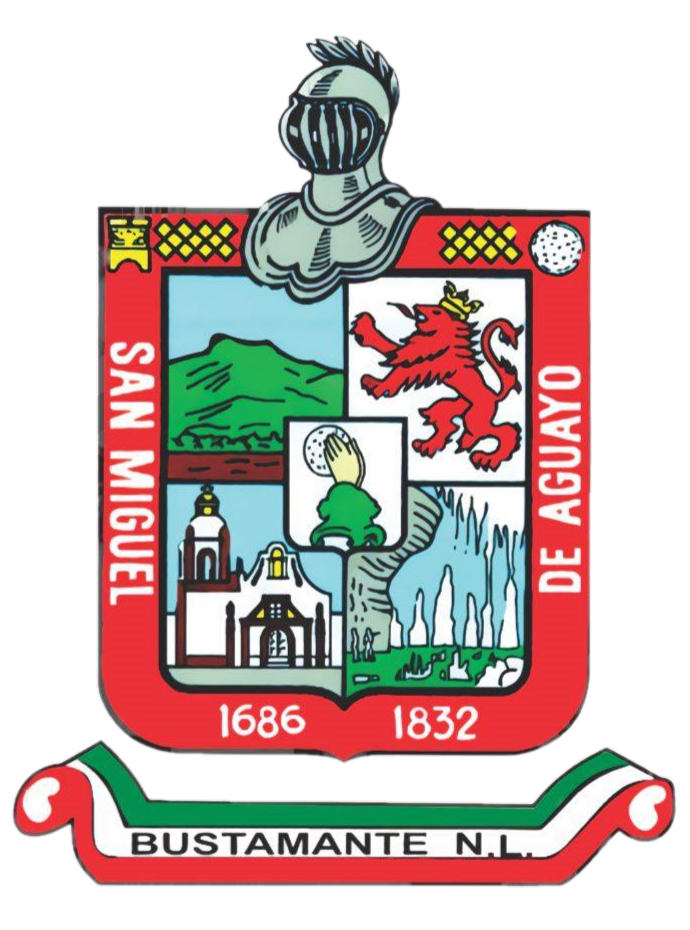
- Coat of arms

- Location in Mexico Bustamante (Mexico)
- Coordinates: 26°32′N 100°30′W
- Country: Mexico
- State: Nuevo León
- Municipal seat: Bustamante
- Established: 1686
- Named for: Anastasio Bustamante

Government
  - Federal electoral district: Nuevo León's 13th

Area
  - Total: 558 km^{2} (215 sq mi)
- Elevation: 376 m (1,234 ft)

Population (2010)
  - Total: 3,773
- Time zone: UTC-6 (Zona Centro)

Bustamante is a municipality and town of Mexico in the state of Nuevo León. The full name is San Miguel de Bustamante. The municipality has an area of 558 km^{2} (215 sq mi). It is bordered on the north by Lampazos de Naranjo and the state of Coahuila, on the south by Mina and Villaldama, Nuevo León, on the east by Villaldama, and on the west by Mina. In 2010 the population of the municipality was 3,773, of which nearly all lived in the town of Bustamante.

== Geography ==
Bustamante is located in an irrigated valley at the mouth of a well-watered canyon in the headwaters of the Sabinas River, a tributary of the Salado River. The Sierra de Gomas to the west of the town rise to an elevation of 5,591 feet (1,704 m) at the Cabeza de Leon four miles south-southwest of Bustamante. East of town is the Sierra de Lampazos which rise to an elevation of 3,816 feet (1,163 m)

The climate is semi-arid with about 20 inches (500 mm) of precipitation annually, mostly falling in summer. Summers are hot and winters are mild, with the lowest annual temperature usually about 23 °F (−5 °C).

== History ==
The Spanish recruited more than 400 Tlaxcalan families in 1591 to settle in northern Mexico to help pacify and integrate the northern Indian tribes, collectively called the Chichimeca. This was one of the measures taken to resolve the long-running Chichimeca War. Sixteen Tlaxcalan families among the ancestors of the Tlaxcalans who were settled near Saltillo moved north in 1686 to found Bustamante, which was originally called San Miguel de Aguayo de la Nueva Tlaxcala. The Franciscans established a mission nearby to convert the Alazapas, a local band of nomadic Indians, to Christianity.

In 1690, silver mines were established about five miles (8 km) from Bustamante and the town of Villaldama was founded. Bustamante depended upon agriculture and provided labor and food for the mines. The Alazapa resisted the Spanish and Tlaxcalan settlements. A few Alazapa survived into the 19th century, but were expelled to Monterrey, Nuevo León in 1860 and absorbed into the Hispanic population. Bustamante received its present name in 1832. It was named after Anastasio Bustamante, a President of newly independent Mexico.

On October 5, 1840, the area was raided by a band of Comanche Indians estimated to number 300 to 400. In Bustamante, the Comanche killed 17 people, abducted more than a dozen, and stole eight hundred head of livestock. This marked the onset of three decades of Comanche raids which devastated communities all over northern Mexico and, from 1848 to 1860, caused at least 71 deaths and 18 abductions in Bustamante. The disorganized central government of Mexico was of little help to the beleaguered northerners. A militia force of about 100 Tlaxcalans and Alazapa guarded mountain passes Comanche raiders were likely to use as part of a mobile force of 2,000 cavalry which patrolled northern and western Nuevo León. (See Comanche-Mexico Wars)

Adding to the misery were epidemics of disease. Cholera cost 197 lives in the Bustamante region in 1849 and smallpox in 1856-1857 killed 429 in a wider area. The epidemics also took a heavy toll on the Indian raiders and the number of raids dropped substantially after the late 1850s, culminating in one last Comanche raid in 1870.

== Attractions ==
The main tourist attractions are the Bustamante Caves about two miles southwest of the town.
