= Abasolo, Nuevo León =

Municipality and town in the Mexican state of Nuevo Leon

Abasolo
- Municipality
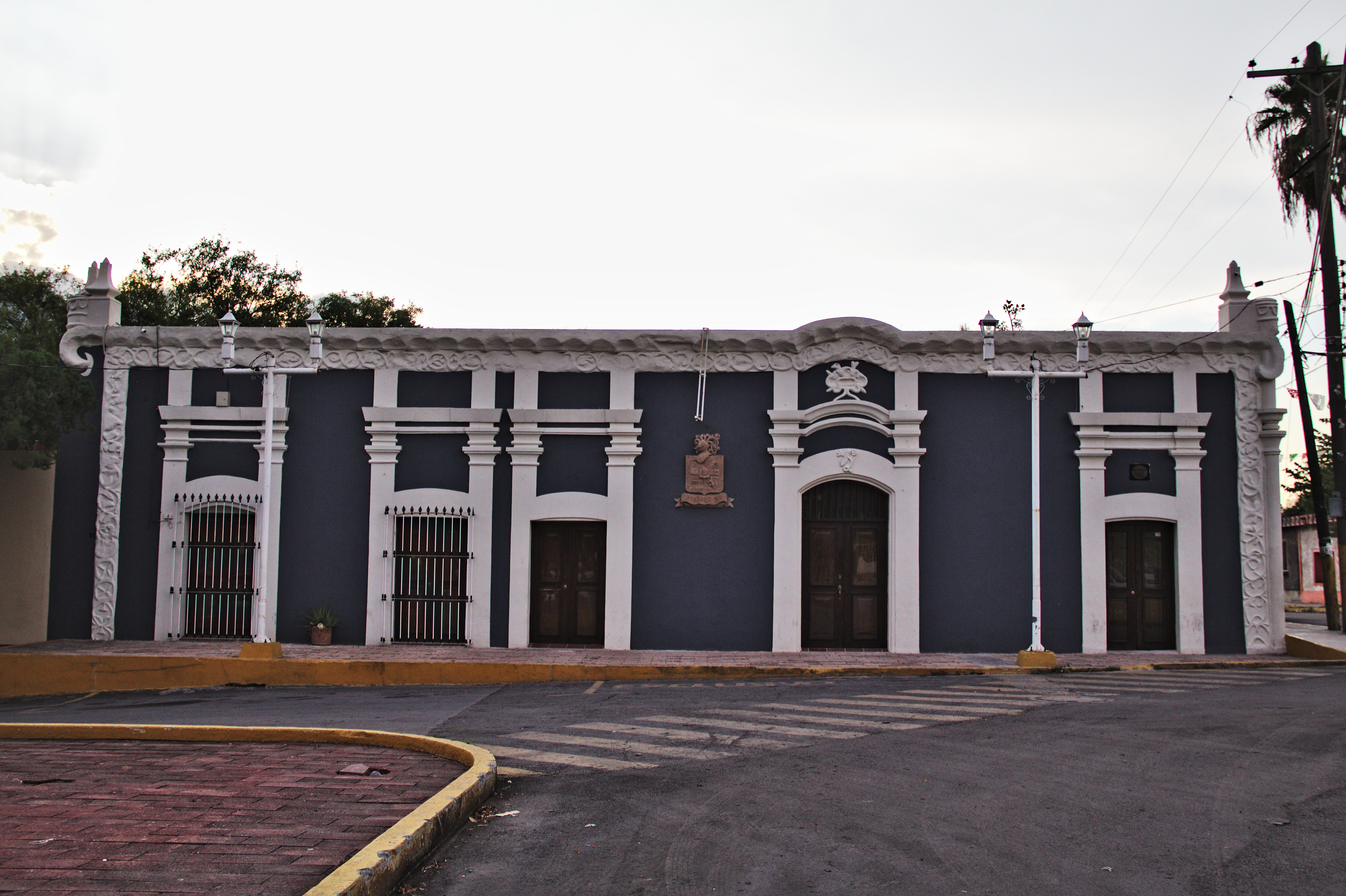
- Abasolo Town Hall

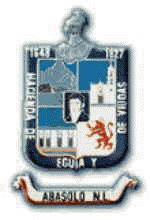
- Coat of arms

- Location within Nuevo León Location within Mexico
- Coordinates: 25°56′42″N 100°23′56″W
- Country: Mexico
- State: Nuevo León
- Named for: Mariano Abasolo

Government
  - Type: Municipality
  - Mayor: Reynaldo Javier Cantú Montes (MC)
  - Federal electoral district: Nuevo León's 13th

Population (2020 census)
  - Total: 2,974 (municipality)
- Time zone: UTC-6 (Zona Centro)

Abasolo is both a municipality and a town in the Mexican state of Nuevo Leon. The municipality was named in honor of Mariano Abasolo, who participated in the Mexican War of Independence.

== Geography ==
The municipality of Abasolo is located in the central western region of the state, in the Salinas Valley. Its coordinates are 29º98’ N and 100º23’ W. Abasolo extends over 76.90 square kilometers and is 907 metres (2,976 ft) above sea level.

The municipality limits with the following municipalities, all within Nuevo León: to the North with Salinas Victoria; to the South and West with Hidalgo and Salinas Victoria; to the east with El Carmen.

=== Climate ===
The prevailing climate in the municipality is temperate and hot, with an average temperature of 18 °C; May and June are the warmest months. Average annual rainfall is between 400 and 500 millimeters; August, September and October are the rainy season.

== Population centers ==
The municipality has a total of 13 population centers, of which the following are the largest:

- The municipal seat, also named Abasolo, which had a population of 1,780 in 1995
- Kilómetro 21, population 69
- Viveros Dávila (La Laborcita), population 25
- Dolores
- Los Ligueros
- Agapita
- Arroyo Báez
- Huerta Magdalena
