= Anáhuac Municipality =

Coordinates: 27°14′26″N 100°07′56″W

- Municipality
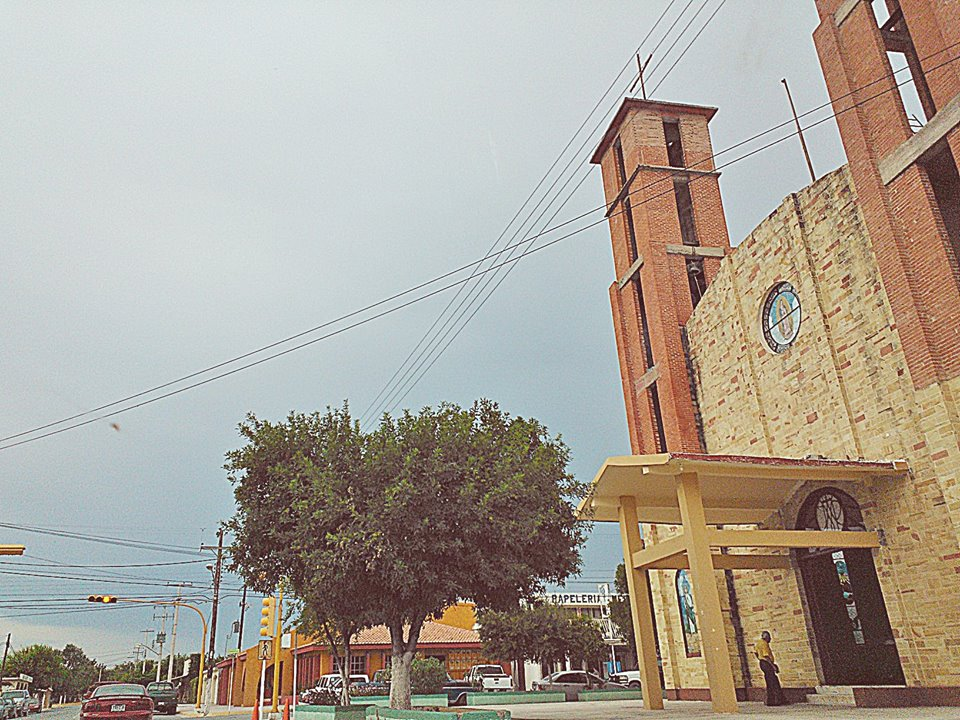

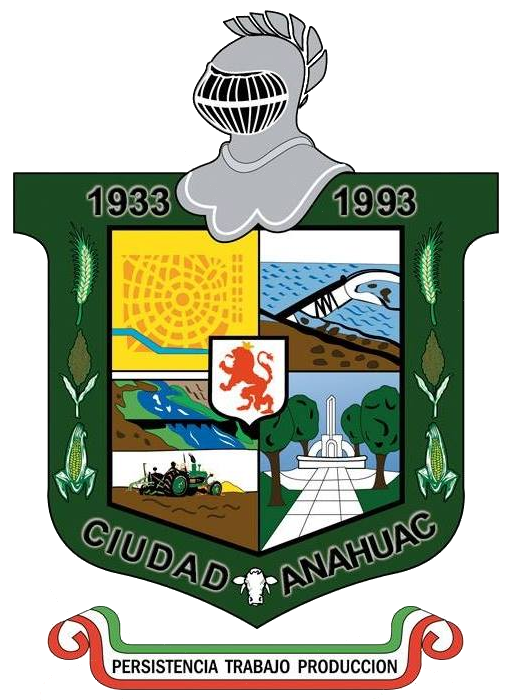
- Coat of arms
- Motto: Progress and Production
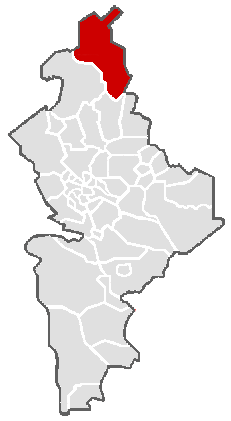
- Country: Mexico
- State: Nuevo León
- Established: May 5, 1933

Government
  - Type: Municipality
  - Municipal President: Juan Manuel Morton Gonzalez
  - Federal electoral district: Nuevo León's 13th

Area
  - Total: 4,569.6 km^{2} (1,764.3 sq mi)
- Elevation: 197 m (646 ft)

Population (2020 census)
  - Total: 18,030
- Time zone: UTC–06:00 (Zona Centro)
  - Summer (DST): UTC–05:00 (DST)
- Website: Anáhuac Municipality

Anáhuac Municipality is one of the municipalities of the Mexican state of Nuevo León. The city of Anáhuac was founded on May 5, 1933, inside the municipal jurisdiction of Lampazos de Naranjo, Nuevo León, as the political head of the National System of Irrigation No.04 (SNI). On May 29, 1935, this city was declared a municipality. By decision of the Government of the State the municipal territory annexed the abandoned community of Colombia, Nuevo León in 1978. From 1992, Anáhuac Municipality has received federal contributions for the commercial use of the Colombia-Solidarity International Bridge, which is the only international border crossing between Nuevo León and Texas. Anáhuac Municipality is divided into eight regions: Estación Rodríguez, Ejido Nuevo Rodríguez, Ejido Camarón, Ejido Nuevo Anáhuac, Ejido Rodríguez, Ciudad Anáhuac, Salinillas, and Regantes.

== Geography ==
Anáhuac Municipality is located in the northern area in Nuevo León in a region called Llanos Esteparios del Noreste. It is the only municipality in Nuevo León that has a border with the United States. Lake Venustiano Carranza also known as Don Martin, is the primary source of irrigation water for the municipality. The lake is located in the municipality of Juárez, Coahuila. The Salado River crosses the municipality, its river basin extends to the Northern part of the states of Coahuila, Nuevo León and Tamaulipas. The Salado River is formed by the Camarón creek, Galameses creek, and the Sabinas Hidalgo River. The municipality covers an area of 1,764.3 mi^{2} (4,569.6 km^{2}).

=== Towns and villages ===
The largest localities (cities, towns, and villages) are:

Name	2010 Census Population
Anáhuac	16,628
Colombia	514
Nuevo Anáhuac	107
Nuevo Rodríguez	93
Salinillas	89
La Gloria	65
Nuevo Camarón	62
Lázaro Cárdenas	50
Total Municipality	18,480

=== Adjacent municipalities and counties ===
- Nuevo Laredo Municipality, Tamaulipas - east
- Guerrero Municipality, Tamaulipas - east
- Vallecillo Municipality - south
- Lampazos de Naranjo Municipality - southwest
- Juárez Municipality, Coahuila - northwest
- Hidalgo Municipality, Coahuila - north
- Webb County, Texas - northeast

=== Climate ===
The climate in Anáhuac, is semiarid, with low precipitation and extreme temperatures. During all the seasons Anáhuac experiences low humidity. The average winter temperature is around 2 °C and during the summer the temperature is 44 to 46 °C. The highest temperatures are during June, July and August and the lowest temperatures are during December and January.

=== Flora and fauna ===
Vegetation found in Anáhuac are: mesquite, ash trees, cacti, among others; in addition some plants like the Coriander, Albacar, Mint, Marjoram, Hsiafiate, Roman Chamomile, and Rue.

== Economy ==
Anáhuac Municipality has diverse sources of income:

- Agriculture: wheat, sorghum, grain and forage are produced in the municipality.
- Commerce: retail, restaurants, and bars.
- Ranching: bovine, goat, ovine, pig, cattle, in addition to deer.
- Industry: brooms and mops, lumber, and automotive parts.

== Demographics ==
The socioeconomic level of the general population is living under poverty, since the average wage is the minimum established by the Mexican government. Most of the inhabitants live in a home which they own. There is an average of 3 rooms per house and there are an average of 5 people living per house. In Anáhuac the Catholic Religion predominates, coexisting with other types of religious beliefs.
