= Hidalgo, Nuevo León =

Coordinates: 25°59′N 100°27′W

Hidalgo
- Municipality
- Location in Mexico Hidalgo (Mexico)
- Country: Mexico
- State: Nuevo León

Government
  - Federal electoral district: Nuevo León's 13th
- Demonym: (in Spanish)
- Time zone: UTC−6 (Zona Centro)

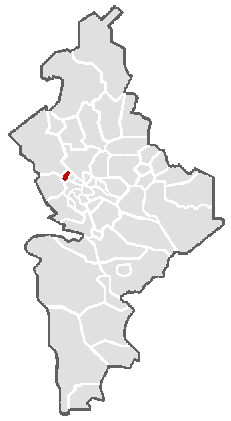
Locator map of the Municipality of Hidalgo, in the state of Nuevo León.

Hidalgo is a town of approximately 20,000 people, in the state of Nuevo León in northeastern Mexico. It serves as the municipal seat for the surrounding municipality of the same name.

== Features ==
The major cement company Cemex began with operations here, and still has an operating factory.

The limestone cliffs and spires of the Potrero Chico rock climbing area, in the municipality, draws rock-climbers from across Mexico and around the world.
