= García, Nuevo León =

García
- City and municipality
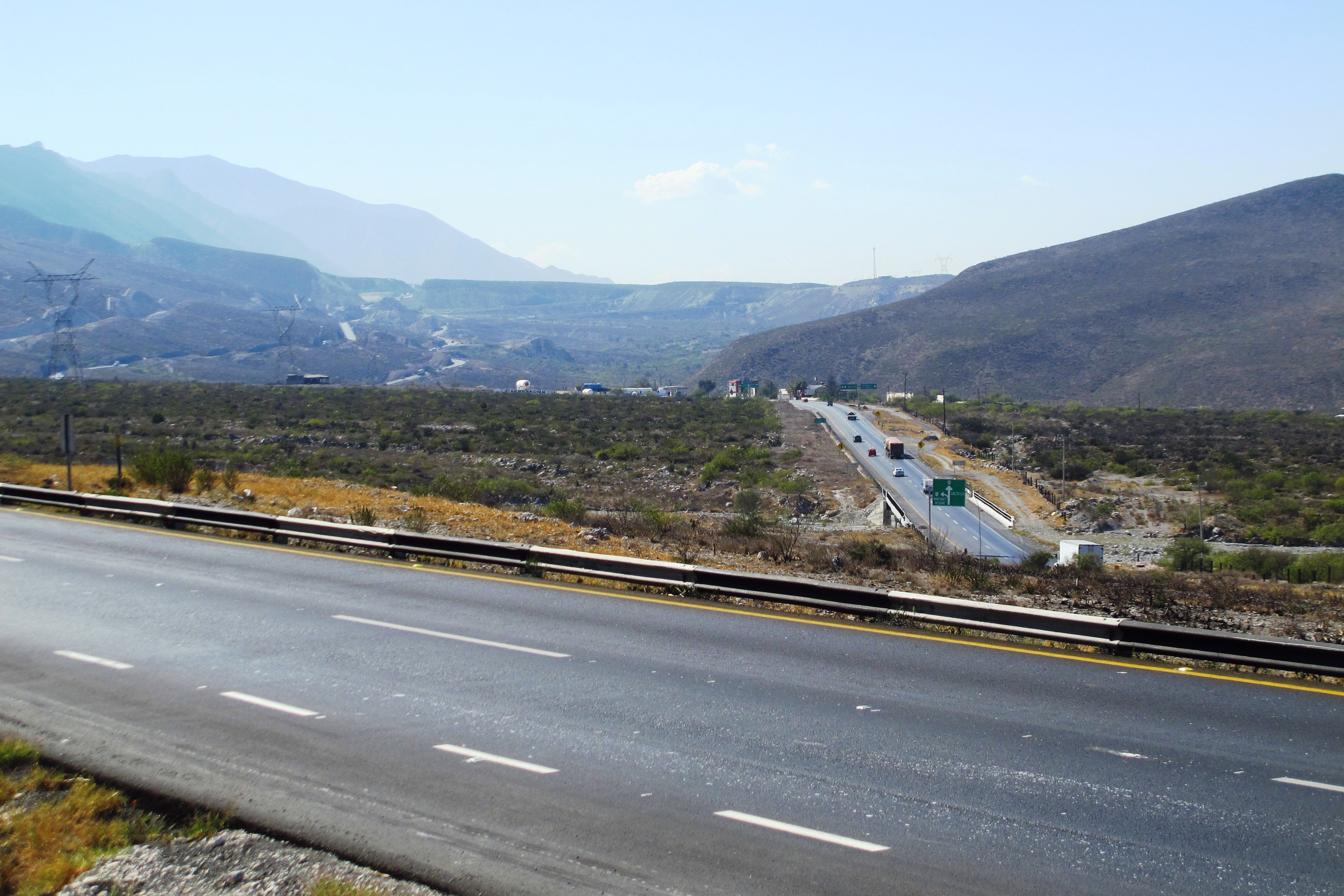

- Coat of arms
- Motto: In Unitate Superatio
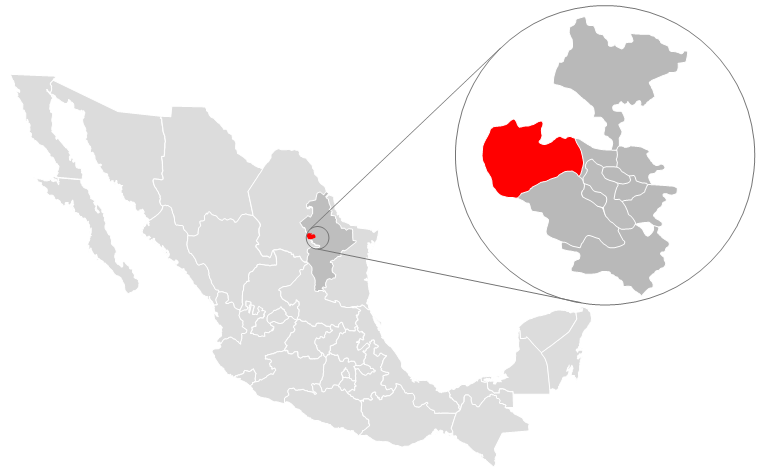
- Coordinates: 25°49′N 100°35′W
- Country: Mexico
- State: Nuevo León
- Founded: 1583

Government
  - Mayor: Manuel Guerra Cavazos (MORENA)
  - Federal electoral district: Nuevo León's 7th

Area
  - City: 25.98 km^{2} (10.03 sq mi)
  - Municipality: 1,032 km^{2} (398 sq mi)
- Elevation: 697 m (2,287 ft)

Population (2020 census)
  - City: 234,698
  - Density: 9,034/km^{2} (23,400/sq mi)
  - Metro: 5,341,177
  - Municipality: 397,205
  - Municipality density: 384.9/km^{2} (996.9/sq mi)
- Time zone: UTC-6 (Zona Centro)
- Website: www.garcianl.gob.mx

García is a city and municipality located to the northwest of the Monterrey metropolitan area in the Mexican state of Nuevo León. The municipality had, according to the 2005 census, a population of 145,867. It borders the municipalities of Mina, Escobedo and Hidalgo to the north; to the south and east with Santa Catarina; and to the west with the state of Coahuila.

== Etymology ==
The municipality was named in honor of a Nuevo León native Joaquín García, who was born in the city and who served two terms as governor of the state of Nuevo León. Before the name change, the municipality was called Hacienda de San Juan el Bautista de Pesquería Grande.

== Economy ==
Aviacsa, before they ceased operations, and Nemak, a part of ALFA have their headquarters in the city. Johnson Controls, the largest American auto battery company, has its lead acid battery recycling plant located in Garcia.
