= El Carmen, Nuevo León =

- Municipality and town
- Templo de Nuestra Señora de Guadalupe El Carmen 2022.jpg

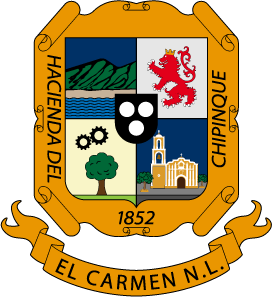
- Coat of arms
- Nickname: Carmen
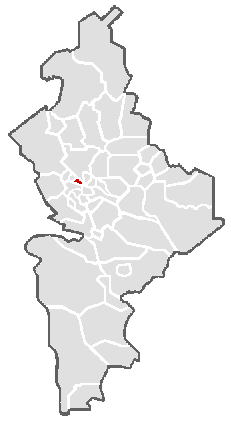
- Coordinates: 25°55′58″N 100°21′51″W
- Country: Mexico
- State: Nuevo León
- Founded: 1614

Government
  - Type: Municipality
  - Mayor: Ing. Gerardo Alfonso de la Maza Villarreal
  - Federal electoral district: Nuevo León's 13th

Area
  - Municipality: 104.3 km^{2} (40.3 sq mi)
  - Town: 7.13 km^{2} (2.75 sq mi)

Population (2020 census)
  - Municipality: 104,478
  - Density: 1,002/km^{2} (2,594/sq mi)
  - Town: 11,583
  - Town density: 1,620/km^{2} (4,210/sq mi)
- Time zone: UTC-6 (Zona Centro)
- Website: El Carmen

El Carmen, often known as "Carmen", is a town and municipality of the northeastern Mexican state of Nuevo León. The population was 6,996 at the 2005 census. Located in the Salinas Valley region, it is one of the smallest municipalities of the state of Nuevo León, is bordered by the municipalities of Salinas Victoria at North and East, General Escobedo at South, Abasolo and Hidalgo at West. As of 2009, its population is projected to be much higher than it was in the last census, as there is a large number of people moving to this municipality and surrounded municipalities, mainly people from other places outside Nuevo León, because of the lower house prices, compared to that of Monterrey, and the increasing potential of the region due to the relatively close distance to Monterrey, and constant expansion of its metropolitan area, which is estimated to absorb this municipality soon.

== Localities ==
| Name | Population (2020) | Area |
|---|---|---|
| El Jaral | 30,843 | 1.48 km^{2} |
| Buena Vista | 29,920 | 2.90 km^{2} |
| Villas del Arco | 21,275 | 1.36 km^{2} |
| Carmen | 11,583 | 7.13 km^{2} |
| Alianza Real | 9,532 | 1.05 km^{2} |
| Emiliano Zapata | 980 | 2.68 km^{2} |

== History ==
The area was settled by Canarian captain Bernanbé de las Casas, who, with other Spanish, primarily Canarians settlers, established several settlements across the Salinas Valley. De las Casas owned an extensive collection of lands, mines and small settlements in the Salinas valley, However, the town which is today El Carmen, was an unsettled territory inherited from Bernabé de las Casas to his daughter, Juliana de las Casas and her husband in 1614, founded as the Hacienda de Chipinque. The small village remained almost unpopulated, so the area which comprised the small town was sold in 1616 to Diego de Villarreal, a Spanish captain and his sons, in order to increase the Spanish population the Salinas Valley region.

On February 5, 1852, was signed a decree by then Governor of Nuevo León, Agapito García, and his executive secretary Santiago Vidaurri, in the document, the village of Chipinque and surrounded area, would form a new and independent municipality of Nuevo León, named "El Carmen".

== Economy ==
The main activities of the municipality are agriculture, ranching, cattle and most recently manufacturing industry, as there are several factories recently created around the municipality

El Carmen, as well as other neighbouring municipalities in the Salinas Valley such as Hidalgo, Abasolo, Salinas Victoria and Mina, have a great potential of development as they are relatively close to Monterrey and its metropolitan area. Those municipalities constitute the recently named peripheral region of the metropolitan area of Monterrey.

== Sports ==
The most practiced sport in the municipality is baseball, it has a baseball park and a small stadium, and it is seat of the Academia de Béisbol, one of the most important Baseball academies in Nuevo León and Northeastern Mexico. Also El Carmen has a favorite team playing on San Nicolas Baseball League it has been Champion once and got stolen three championships the name of the actual League is "Juan Manuel(Melin)García”.

The municipality has, also, several places to practice other sports such as soccer, volleyball and basketball.
