= Parás =

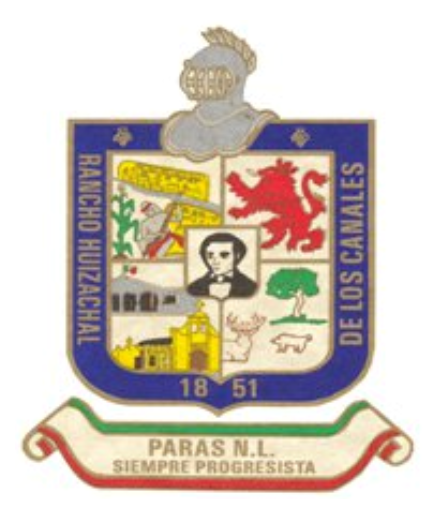
- Coat of arms
- Motto: Siempre Progresitsa (Always Progressive)
- Interactive map of Parás
- Coordinates: 26°29′58″N 99°31′24″W
- Country: Mexico
- State: Nuevo León
- Founded: February 17, 1851

Government
  - Mayor: Ana Iza Olivera Treviño (PAN)
  - Federal electoral district: Nuevo León's 13th

Area
  - Total: 1,008.68 km^{2} (389.45 sq mi)
- Elevation: 141 m (463 ft)

Population (2020 census)
  - Total: 906
- Time zone: UTC-6 (Zona Centro)
- Website: http://www.paras.gob.mx

Parás is a rural municipal town in the state of Nuevo León, Mexico, founded on February 17, 1851. It lies southwest of the Falcón Reservoir in Tamaulipas. It was founded in what was known as Rancho Huizachal de los Canales. The name Parás is derived from Jose María Parás y Ballesteros, the first constitutional governor of Nuevo León.
