= Lampazos, Nuevo León =

Lampazos de Naranjo, Nuevo León
- City and municipality
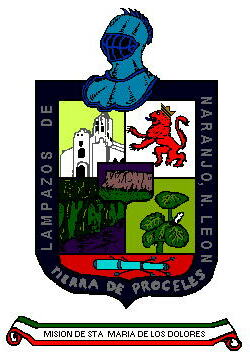
- Coat of arms
- Motto: The Land of Illustrious Men
- Location within Nuevo León Location within Mexico
- Coordinates: 27°1′30″N 100°30′20″W
- Country: Mexico
- State: Nuevo León
- Founded: November 12, 1698

Government
  - Type: Municipality
  - Mayor: Adriana Martínez (PAN)
  - Federal electoral district: Nuevo León's 13th

Area
  - Total: 4,020 km^{2} (1,550 sq mi)
- Elevation: 335 m (1,099 ft)

Population (2020 census)
  - Total: 5,351 (municipality)
- Time zone: UTC−06:00 (Zona Centro)
- Website: Lampazos de Naranjo

Lampazos de Naranjo is a city and municipality located in Nuevo León, Mexico. Its name is composed of two parts: the first honors the local plant Xanthosoma robustum, called lampazos in Spanish; the second, de Naranjo, means "of General Naranjo" (a customary feature in Latin American names). According to the 2020 INEGI census, the municipality had 5,351 inhabitants.

== Geography ==
Lampazos de Naranjo is located in the northwestern region of Nuevo León in the coordinates 27º01´N latitude and 100º31´W longitude. Lampazos has an elevation of 335m above sea level. The municipality covers a 4,020 km² area. The Lampazos mountain range crosses the municipality from north to south. The Carrizal hills and the Mesa de Catujanes are located within Lampazos. Its main river contains large amounts of salt.

== History ==
Lampazos was founded November 12, 1698 by Fray Diego de Salazar under the name of “San Antonio de la Nueva Tlaxcala y misión de Nuestra Señora de los Dolores de la Punta de Lampazos”. In 1877, its name was changed to Villa de Lampazos. Today, it is known as “Lampazos de Naranjo” in honor to a hero of the French intervention and the Reformation, general Francisco Naranjo. In 1935, Its territorial extension was reduced because the municipality of Anáhuac was created. On December 28, 1977 Lampazos grew and was classified as a city. Owing to the great number of historical people, the municipality is known as “the land of illustrious men”. Among them: General Francisco Naranjo de la Garza (1839–1908), General Santiago Vidaurri Valdes, General Juan Zuazua Esparza, Captain Juan Ignacio Ramon, General Pablo González Garza, General Heliodoro T. Perez Trevino, Nemesio Garcia Naranjo, General Antonio I. Villareal, among others.

In 1870, Lampazos suffered what may have been the last of many Comanche raids into northern Mexico. The Comanche reportedly killed 30 persons in the municipality.

== Economy ==
The main economic activity in the municipality is tourism and ranching cattle, and goats. The building of the mission of Our Lady of Dolores at the moment lodges the Lampazos Museum. On June 24 there is a celebration in the city called San Juan Bautista and on May 29, there is a fair known as La Feria del Cabrito (Goat Fair). Lampazos also has a spring called Ojo de Agua (Eye of Water) that filters the water that seeps from the surrounding mountains and hills. The Ojo de Agua is surrounded by gigantic Montezuma Cypress trees and there are grill pits so the tourists can enjoy the landscape while cooking out.

== Sister cities ==
- United States Laredo, Texas
