= Ciénega de Flores =

- Municipality
- Coat of arms

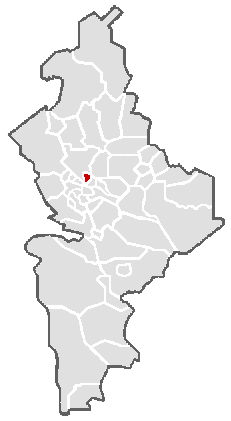
- Coordinates: 25°57′N 100°11′W
- Country: Mexico
- State: Nuevo León
- Settled: 1675

Government
  - Presidente Municipal: Pedro Alonso Casas Quiñones
  - Federal electoral district: Nuevo León's 13th

Area
  - Total: 138.7 km^{2} (53.6 sq mi)

Population (2005 INEGI Census)
  - Total: 14,268
  - Density: 102.9/km^{2} (266.4/sq mi)
- Time zone: UTC-6 (Zona Centro)
- Postal code: 65550
- Area code: +52-825
- Website: Municipio de Ciénega de Flores

Ciénega de Flores is a city and surrounding municipality located in Nuevo Leon, Mexico near Monterrey. It has a large Bridgestone tire factory opened in 2007.

== Tradition ==
Ciénega de Flores is recognized by its famous machacado (dry meat) food, which is one of the traditional foods in Nuevo León.

== Demographics ==
According to the INEGI 2005 census Ciénega de Flores had a population of 14,268, which 5,735 are male and 5,469 are female. Out of the total population 37 or 0.39% were Native Indian. 8,117 of the total population were Catholic and 1,318 were affiliated to other religions. There are 3,497 household of which 3,370 are owner occupied.

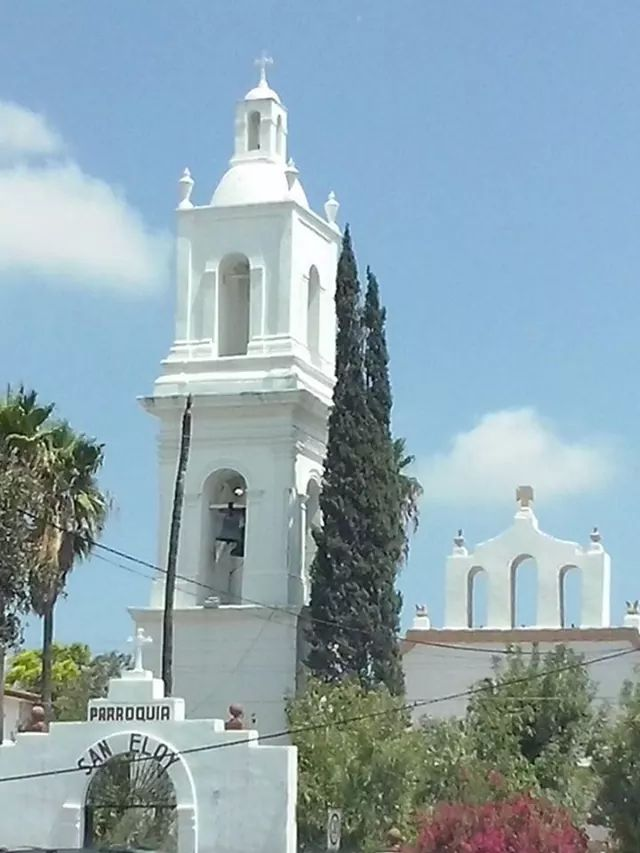
San Eloy Church in Ciénega de Flores.
