= Salinas Victoria =

City in Nuevo León, Mexico

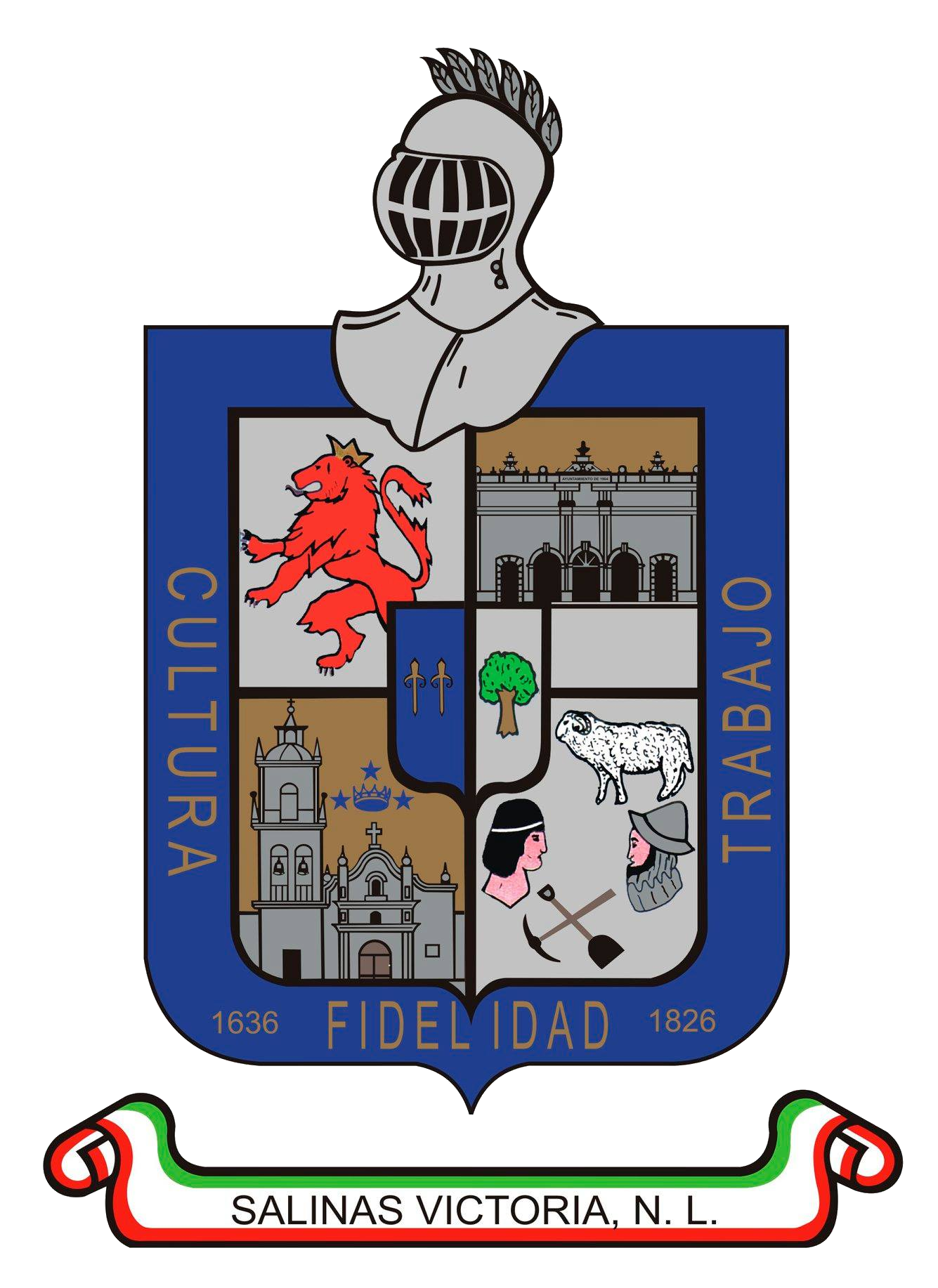
- Coat of arms
- Motto: Cultura, Fidelidad, Trabajo
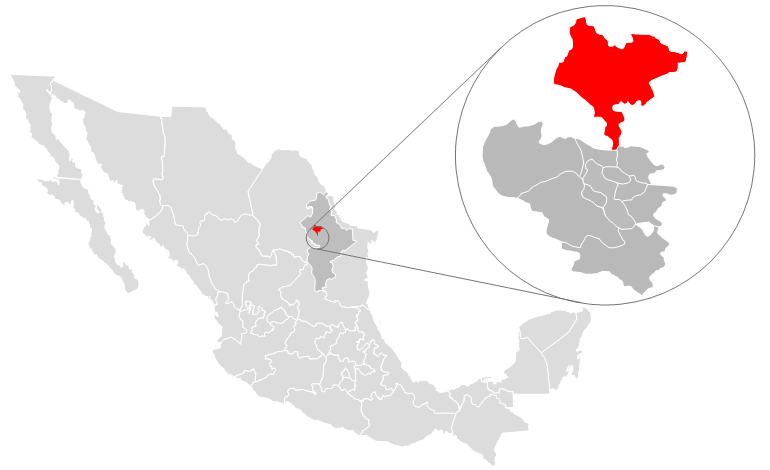
- Coordinates: 25°58′N 100°18′W
- Country: Mexico
- State: Nuevo León
- Founded: No precise date, between 1586 or 1587

Government
  - Mayor: Rebeca Lozano Débora (PRI)
  - Federal electoral district: Nuevo León's 13th

Area
  - Municipality: 1,667 km^{2} (644 sq mi)
  - town: 4.49 km^{2} (1.73 sq mi)
- Elevation: 464 m (1,522 ft)

Population (2020 census)
  - Municipality: 86,766
  - Density: 52.05/km^{2} (134.8/sq mi)
  - Metro: 5,341,177
  - Town: 13,059
  - Town density: 2,910/km^{2} (7,530/sq mi)
- Time zone: UTC-6 (Zona Centro)
- Website: https://www.salinasvictoria.gob.mx/

Salinas Victoria is a municipality and town located in the center of the state of Nuevo León, Mexico. It shares borders with 11 municipalities including, to the north Villaldama and Sabinas Hidalgo; to the south Escobedo and Apodaca; to the east Higueras, Ciénega de Flores and General Zuazua; and finally to the west with Mina, Hidalgo, Abasolo and El Carmen.

Salinas Victoria is the northernmost and, with an extension of 1,667 square kilometers, the largest municipality of the Monterrey metropolitan area. According to the 2005 census, it had a population of 27,848.

== Origin of the name ==
"Salinas" (Spanish for salt marshes) was chosen because the lands present saline characteristics. "Victoria" after the first Mexican president Guadalupe Victoria.

== Localities ==
| Name | Population (2020) | Area |
|---|---|---|
| Cumbre del Norte | 7,000 | 1.78 km^{2} |
| Los Pilares | 25,995 | 1.78 km^{2} |
| Valle del Norte | 14,305 | 1.55 km^{2} |
| Salinas Victoria | 13,059 | 4.49 km^{2} |
| Bosques de los Nogales | 11,980 | 1.34 km^{2} |
| Emiliana Zapata | 6,309 | 2.33 km^{2} |
| Mission | 5,113 | 1.50 km^{2} |
