= Sabinas Hidalgo =

Municipality in Nuevo León, Mexico

City of Sabinas Hidalgo
Coat of arms of the Municipality of Sabinas Hidalgo
Motto: Noble Pasado, Fecundo Porvenir
("Noble past, fruitful future")

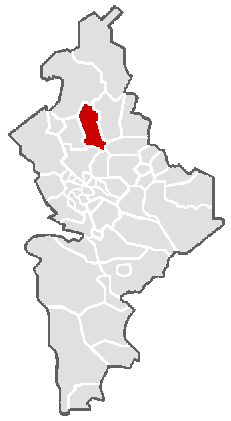

Sabinas Hidalgo
in Nuevo León state.

Foundation date
July 25, 1693
Population
32 040 (2005)
Population density
19.28/km^{2} (2005)
Altitude
313 meters
Coordinates
26°30′N 100°11′W
UTC
- 6 hours(Central)
Telephone code number
824
_{Sources: INEGI,
Enciclopedia de los Municipios de México,)
CONAPO}

Nuestra Señora de Guadalupe parish

Sabinas Hidalgo is a city and municipality located in the Mexican state of Nuevo León. The state capital, Monterrey, lies approximately 105 kilometres (65 mi) to the south, Nuevo Laredo, Tamaulipas is about 130 kilometres (81 mi) to the north, and Laredo, Texas, United States, is located 140 kilometres (87 mi) to the north.

== Geography ==
Sabinas Hidalgo is located in the northern part of the state at north latitude 26º31' and west longitude 100º10', lying 313 meters above sea level. It shares a border to the north by Lampazos; to the south by Salinas Victoria and Higueras; to the east by Vallecillo and Agualeguas; and to the west by Lampazos, Villaldama, and Salinas Victoria.

== History ==
The town was officially founded as Real de Santiago de las Sabinas on July 25, 1693 by Nestor Alejandro Gonzalez Baldazo. It had been inhabited since 1692.

It was named Villa de Sabinas Hidalgo in honor of Miguel Hidalgo y Costilla, priest and a leader of the Mexican War of Independence. In 1971, it was designated a city.

The cuisine of the city has reached as far as Chicago.

== Insect parasites ==
In September 2025, a case of New World screwworm (Cochliomyia hominivorax) was found in Sabinas Hidalgo, which is less than 70 miles (110 km) from the US-Mexico border. The United States Department of Agriculture has attempted to eliminate the New World screwworm, and estimated in 2025 that an outbreak in Texas (the biggest cattle-producing US state) could cost US$1.8 billion.

== Tourism ==
- Park "La Turbina"
- Park "Ojo de Agua"
- Park "Charco de lobo"

== See also ==
- Metropolitan areas of Mexico
