= Eloise (given name) =

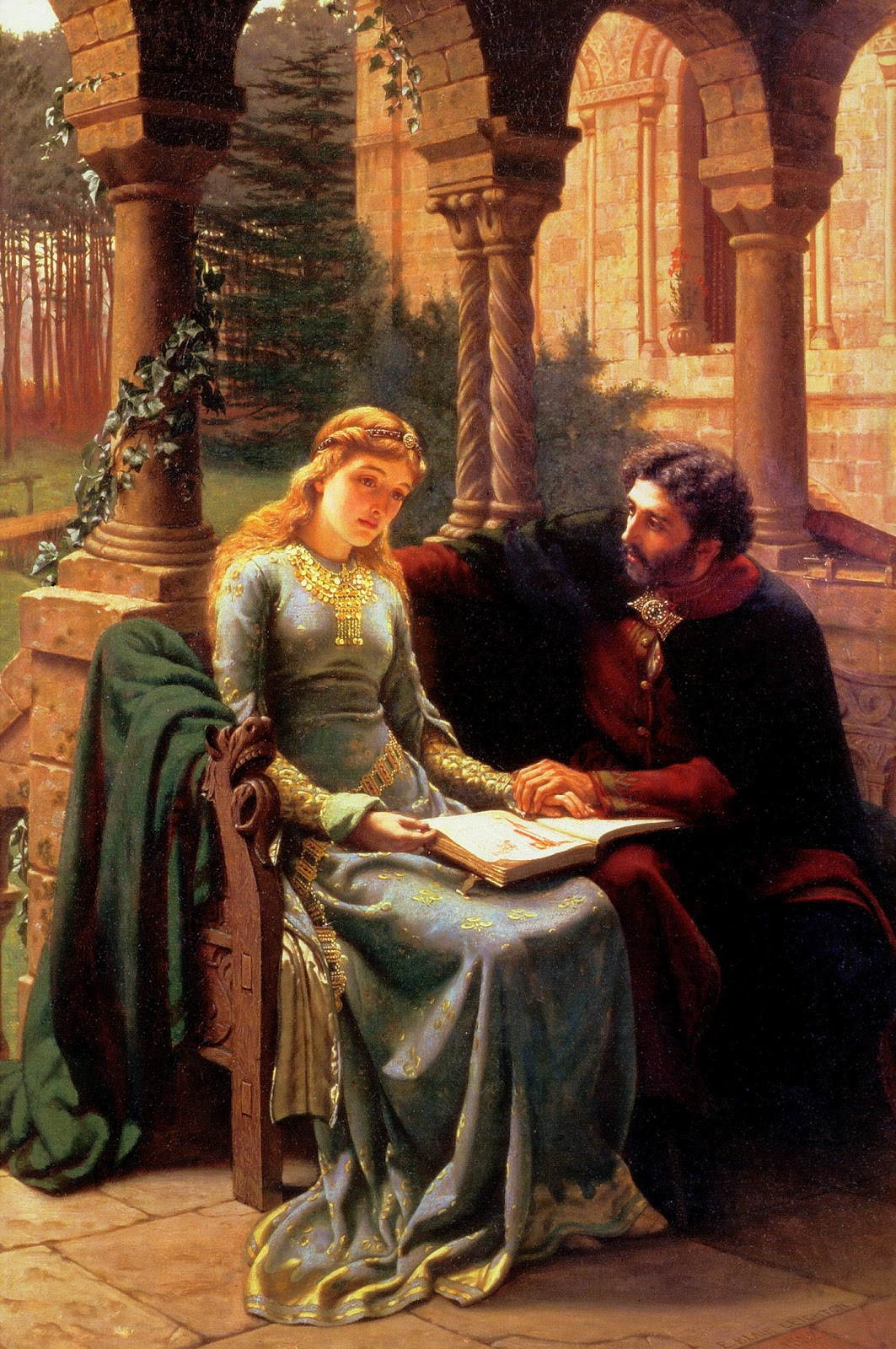
- Abelard and his Pupil Heloise by Edmund Blair Leighton.
- Gender: Female
- Language: German

Origin
- Meaning: "sun”,"healthy" and "wide"

Other names
- See also: Eloisa, Eloísa, Éloïse, Heloisa, Heloísa, Héloïse

Eloise is a female given name, the English version of the French name Éloïse or Héloïse (French pronunciation: [e.lɔ.iz]). It is of uncertain meaning but may be derived from the Old German name Helewidis (German pronunciation: [hɛlɛˈviːdɪs]), which meant "healthy" and "wide". References are made also to the god Helios, referring the name to the sun. The name has increased in usage and ranked among the 100 most popular names for newborn girls in the United States in 2022. A Portuguese form of the name is Heloísa, which is currently among the most popular names for girls in Brazil. Heloisa is used in the Czech, German, and Slovak languages. The Italian version of the name is Eloisa and the Spanish version of the name is Eloísa.

It may refer to:

== People named Eloise ==
- Countess Eloise of Orange-Nassau, Jonkvrouwe van Amsberg, member of the Dutch royal family
- Eloise Amberger (born 1987), Australian synchronized swimmer
- Eloise Anderson (born 1942), American politician and social worker
- Eloise Baza (1953–2007), President of the Guam Chamber of Commerce (1984–2007)
- Eloise Bibb Thompson, American educator, playwright, poet and journalist
- Eloise Blackwell (born 1990), New Zealand rugby union player
- Eloise Blaine Cram (1896–1957), American zoologist
- Eloise Broady (b. 1957), American model and actress
- Eloise Butler (1851–1933), American botanist and gardener
- Eloise E. Clark (1931–2017), American biologist
- Elouise P. Cobell, Native American leader
- Eloise B. Cushing (1887-1977), American attorney
- Eloise Alma Flagg (1918–2018), African-American woman
- Eloise Gerry (1885–1970), American forestry scientist
- Eloise Giblett (1921–2009), American genetic scientist
- Eloise Greenfield (1929–2021), American writer
- Eloise Hardt (1917–2017), American film and television actress
- Eloise Hayward (born 1999), English rugby player
- Eloise Head (born 1994), English social media personality
- Eloise Hubbard Linscott (1897–1978), American folklorist, song collector and preservationist
- Eloise Jarvis McGraw (1915–2000), American author
- Eloise Jelinek (1924–2007), American linguist
- Eloise Jillings, New Zealand academic and professor
- Eloise Jones, multiple people
- Eloïse Jure (born 2001), French ice hockey player
- Eloise Klein Healy (born 1943), American poet
- Eloise Kruger (1914–1995), American miniature collector
- Eloise Kummer (1916–2008), American actress
- Eloise Laity (born 1994), Welsh field hockey player
- Eloise Laws, American singer
- Eloise Lewis (1920–1999), American university dean
- Eloise Lownsbery (1888–1967), American writer
- Eloise Marais, atmospheric chemist
- Eloise McElhone, American radio and television personality
- Eloise McGraw (1915–2000), American children's writer
- Eloise Mignon (born 1986), Australian actress
- Eloise Mumford (born 1986), American actress
- Eloise O'Rourke Pohlad (1917–2003), American philanthropist
- Eloise Page (1920–2002), American intelligence officer
- Eloise Quiñones Keber, American art historian
- Eloise Ramsey (1886–1964), American educator
- Eloise Reyes (born 1956), American politician
- Eloise Roorbach (1868–1961), American writer
- Eloise Scotford (born 1978), Australian academic
- Eloise Sheridan (born 1985), Australian cricket umpire
- Eloise Smith, multiple people
- Eloise Smyth (born 1995), English actress
- Eloise Southby-Halbish (born 1976), Australian netball player and sports commentator
- Eloise Harriet Stannard (1829–1915), British painter
- Eloise Tungpalan (born 1945), American politician
- Eloise C. Uggams (1896–1972), American singer
- Éloïse Vanryssel (born 1999), French fencer
- Eloise Vitelli, American politician
- Eloise Walker (born 2001), Scottish athlete
- Eloise Webb (born 1996), South African rugby player
- Eloise Wellings (born 1982), Australian long-distance runner
- Eloise Wilkin (1904–1987), American illustrator
- Eloise Worledge, Australian girl who went missing in 1976

== People named Eloisa ==
- Eloísa Álvarez (1956–2017), Spanish politician
- Eloisa Cabada (born 1948), Mexican volleyball player
- Eloisa Cianni (1932–2022), Italian actress, model and beauty pageant titleholder
- Eloisa Coiro (born 2000), Italian sprinter and middle distance runner
- Eloisa Compostizo de Andrés (born 1988), Spanish tennis player
- Eloísa Díaz (1866–1950), Chilean physician
- Eloisa Garcia Tamez (born 1935), Native American activist
- Eloísa Gómez-Lucena, Spanish writer
- Eloísa Ibarra (born 1968), Uruguayan artist
- Eloisa James, pen name of Mary Bly
- Eloísa Jiménez Gutiérrez (1908–1990), Mexican painter
- Eloísa Mafalda (1924–2018), Brazilian actress
- Eloisa Biasotto Mano (1924–2019), Brazilian chemist
- Eloisa Marcos (born 1962), Spanish gymnast
- Eloisa Reverie Vezzosi, Italian artist and author
- Eloísa García de Wattenberg (1923–2017), Spanish historian, archivist and museum curator

== Fictional characters ==
- The titular character of the Eloise children's books
- Eloise Bridgerton, a character in Julia Quinn's Regency romance novel series and its adaptation Bridgerton
- Eloise Hawking, a character in the series Lost

== See also ==
- Eloise (disambiguation)
- Eloise, alternative spelling of Héloïse (1090?/1100–1? – 1164), French nun, writer, scholar, and abbess
