= Tamez =

Tamez may refer to:

- Alejo Garza Tamez (1933–2010), Mexican businessman, rancher, and recreational hunter
- Altair Tejeda de Tamez (born 1922) was a Mexican short story writer, poet, playwright, and journalist
- Eloisa Garcia Tamez (born 1935), Lipan Apache (Nde') civil and human rights leader, lecturer, professional nurse, professor
- Elsa Támez (born 1950), Mexican liberation theologian and biblical scholar
- Enrique Garza Támez, General Secretary of the state Congress in Tamaulipas, Mexico
- Gladys Tamez, Mexican-American haute couture milliner
- Guillermo Tamez (born 1966), Mexican boxer
- Jared Tamez, of Salt Lake City, Utah, historian and contributor to Mormonism: A Historical Encyclopedia
- Jose Tamez, president of Salma Hayek's Ventanarosa Productions
- Mayela Quiroga Tamez (born 1976) is a Mexican politician
- Margo Tamez, Lipan Apache, and Jumano Apache activist, poet, and scholar
- Rebeca Tamez (born 1975), former Miss Mexico Universe
- Reyes Tamez (born 1952), a Mexican immunochemist
