= Zemsky =

Zemsky, feminine: Zemskaya is a Russian surname. Notable people with the surname include:

- Aleksandr Zemsky (1897–1955), Soviet architect
- Johann Zemsky, Knight's Cross of the Iron Cross recipient
- Peter Zemsky, American-French academic
- Robert Zemsky (born 1941), American academic
- Yelena Zemskaya (1926–2012), Russian linguist

== See also ==
- Zemsky Sobor
