= James A. McKernan =

American educationist

James McKernan (born November 7, 1950) is an American educational theorist. He is a Professor of Education at East Carolina University, a constituent campus of the University of North Carolina. He has been the King Distinguished Professor and Chair of Education at East Carolina University; Dean and Chair of the Faculty of Education at the University of Limerick, Ireland; College Lecturer, Faculty of Arts, University College Dublin, Ireland and Fulbright Scholar at the Harvard Graduate School of Education and University of Pennsylvania Graduate School of Education and Research Fellow, Northern Ireland Council for Educational Research, Department of Psychology, Queen's University of Belfast.

== Career ==
In 1980 McKernan was appointed as a college lecturer in Education at University College Dublin where he established Curriculum Studies as a new field of teaching and educational inquiry in the Education Department. In 1991 he accepted the King Distinguished Professorship at East Carolina University in Greenville, North Carolina, US. He returned briefly to act as Dean and Chair of the Education Faculty at the University of Limerick, Ireland in 1993. McKernan returned to East Carolina University in 1994. McKernan's educational theory emphasizes the teacher as a researcher and schools as agencies of cultural reconstruction using action research to improve school practices. McKernan is a founder and member of the Educational Studies Association of Ireland and has been its secretary and general editor at times since 1977.

McKernan is an advocate for 'action research' - research used to solve practical social problems experienced by those who encounter the problems themselves. He has developed 'reflective practice' techniques as tools for employing action inquiry in educational settings (Curriculum Action Research: London: Palgrave Macmillan 1998).

McKernan was secretary for the Galway Itinerant Settlement Committee, Galway, Ireland, which provided housing for homeless Irish "Travellers" (nomadic persons) in Galway. In 1971 the group housed all thirty-six families in Galway who had been homeless - the first city to do so in Ireland.

He is a founding member of the Educational Studies Association of Ireland and was editor of its journal Irish Educational Studies. He has been general editor of the Yearbooks of the South Atlantic Philosophy of Education Society (1998–2004) and was President of the Society during 2003-2005. He has been a finalist for the East Carolina University Lifetime Research Award.

== Published works ==
McKernan has authored more than one hundred publications as author, co-author or editor, including twenty-four books, as well as book chapters and scholarly journals in the US, the United Kingdom, Ireland, Australia, France, Brazil, China, Germany, Canada and Sweden.

=== Books ===
- Curriculum and Imagination: Process Theory, Pedagogy and Action Research (London: Routledge) 2008 240 pp.
- Curriculum Action Research (London: Kogan Page) 1996 278 pp.
- Transfer at Fourteen: The Craigavon Two-Tier System as an Organizational Innovation in Education (Belfast: Northern Ireland Council for Educational Research) pp. 114, 1981.
- The Challenge of Change: Curriculum Development in Irish Post-Primary Schools 1970–1984. (Dublin: Institute of Public Administration) pp. 163, 1984 with Dr. T. Crooks, Trinity College, Dublin (Co-author)
- Learning for Life: Tutor's Guide co-authored with E. Moore; E. O Donohue; J. Heuston; D. Condren and S. Fogarty. (Dublin: Gill and Macmillan Co.) pp. 145, 1986
