= Vezzosi =

Vezzosi is an Italian surname. Notable people with the surname include:

- Alessandro Vezzosi (born 1950), Italian art critic
- Antonio Francesco Vezzosi (1708–1783), Italian Theatine and biographical writer
- Eloisa Reverie Vezzosi, Italian artist and author
- Gabriele Vezzosi (born 1968), Italian mathematician

== See also ==
- Vezzoli
