= Laura W. Perna =

American Professor

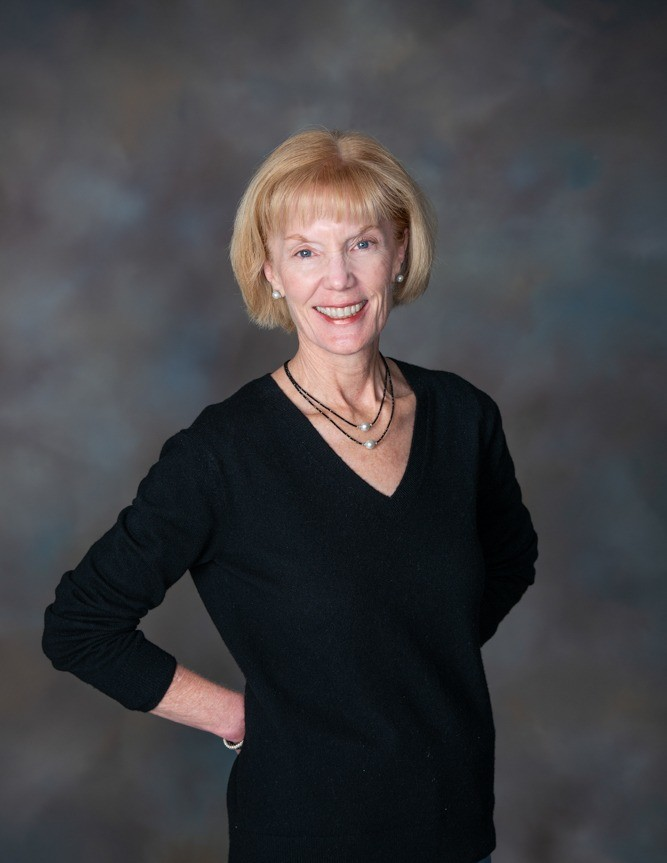
- Born: Pompton Plains, New Jersey
- Occupations: Higher education administrator, academic and author

Academic background
- Education: B.A. Psychology; B.S. Economics; M.P.P. Policy Studies; Ph.D. Education
- Alma mater: University of Pennsylvania; University of Michigan

Academic work
- Institutions: University of Pennsylvania
- Notable students: Michelle Asha Cooper
- Website: https://www.lauraperna.com/

Laura W. Perna is an American academic who is GSE Centennial Professor of Education, Founding Executive Director of the Alliance for Higher Education and Democracy (Penn AHEAD), and Senior Vice Provost for Faculty at the University of Pennsylvania.

Perna's research employs various methodological approaches to examine how social structures, educational practices, and public policies impact college access and success, particularly for individuals from lower-income families and racial/ethnic minoritized groups. Perna has won the Christian R. and Mary F. Lindback Foundation Award for Distinguished Teaching, Robert P. Huff Golden Quill Award, Excellence in Public Policy in Higher Education Award, Recognition of Service Award, Distinguished Alumni Award, Exemplary Research Award, and Faculty Alumni Award of Merit. She is a Fellow of the American Educational Research Association and an Elected Member of the National Academy of Education.

In 2025, Perna was selected as a member of the inaugural class of Fellows of the Association for the Study of Higher Education (ASHE).

Her research on higher education access, affordability, public policy, and student success has influenced national discussions on educational opportunity and has been cited in policy development, congressional testimony, and higher education reform initiatives. She has authored or edited numerous books, policy reports, and scholarly publications and is regarded as one of the leading scholars in higher education policy and educational equity in the United States.

== Early life and education ==
Perna earned a Bachelor of Arts in Psychology from the College of Arts & Sciences and a Bachelor of Science in Economics from The Wharton School at Penn. At the University of Michigan, she obtained a Master of Public Policy in Policy Studies from the Gerald R. Ford School of Public Policy and PhD in education from the Center for the Study of Higher and Postsecondary Education in the School of Education.

== Career ==
Perna began her faculty career at the University of Maryland-College Park in 1999 and was appointed to the faculty of Penn's Graduate School of Education (GSE) in 2005. Earlier in her career, she served as Director of Institutional Research and Planning at the University of Dallas, and as Research Scientist and Director of Data Analysis at the Frederick D. Patterson Research Institute of the United Negro College Fund. At Penn, she was the James S. Riepe Presidential Professor (2014 to 2019) and since 2019 is the GSE Centennial Presidential Professor of Education. She is Founding Executive Director of the Alliance for Higher Education and Democracy (Penn AHEAD). She served as Chair of Penn GSE's Higher Education Division and Chair of Penn's Faculty Senate and has been Penn's Vice Provost for Faculty since July 1, 2020.

During her tenure, she led initiatives related to faculty recruitment, promotion, retention, professional development, faculty well-being, and institutional governance. She was reappointed to the position in 2025 and, in 2026, was elevated to Senior Vice Provost for Faculty.

== Leadership and advisory work ==
Perna serves or has served on the board of directors for the Postsecondary Network Policy Institute (PNPI), Lenfest Scholars Foundation, and Institute for Higher Education Policy, and is a member of Bowdoin College's THRIVE Program Advisory Group. She served as president of the Association for the Study of Higher Education (ASHE) and vice president of the postsecondary division of the American Educational Research Association (AERA). She has served on the AERA Grants Governing Board, advisory panels for the U.S. Department of Education, Lumina Foundation, and Spencer Foundation, and was a member of the Bill & Melinda Gates Foundation's Postsecondary Value Commission. She has been Editor of Higher Education: Handbook of Theory and Research annual book series since 2018.

== Public impact ==
Perna has focused her research on access, choice, and equity in higher education, college finance, and affordability, as well as federal and state involvement in college education. She has been featured on radio shows like National Public Radio and Huffington Post Live and a resource for media outlets including The New York Times, Wall Street Journal, Washington Post, The Journalist Resource, The Atlantic, and The Hill.

Perna's contributions include providing recommendations to state and federal policymakers, including through invited testimony to the U.S. Senate's Health, Education, Labor, and Pensions Committee and the U.S. House of Representatives Subcommittee on Higher Education and Workforce Training.

== Scholarship ==
Perna's work has identified sources of persistent differences in educational attainment across racial/ethnic and income groups, despite substantial investments from governments, institutions, and philanthropies to close these disparities. She has received funding from the U.S. Department of Education's Institute of Education Sciences, Lumina Foundation, and other organizations with publications including journal articles, policy reports, edited volumes, and books. Her scholarship also examines how to connect education research to public policy and sources of observed differences in faculty salary, rank, and tenure.

A primary goal of Perna's scholarship has been to understand how to increase higher education attainment, particularly for underrepresented students. By specifying how college opportunity and outcomes have been influenced by characteristics of the family, school, community, and state contexts in which students live and are embedded, her 2006 conceptual model has highlighted what education administrators and policymakers can do to improve college opportunity and outcomes for particular groups of students in particular places.

Perna utilizes economic and sociological frameworks, along with quantitative and qualitative methods, to analyze the impact of public policies and institutional practices on college access and success. Her research examines predictors of undergraduate enrollment for African American and Hispanic students, institutional strategies for promoting STEM attainment, the influence of state policies on college enrollment, the cost-related information presented to students and families via net price calculators, and the effects of grants on college student outcomes. She partnered with The Pell Institute of the Council on Opportunity in Education to produce the Indicators of Higher Education Equity in the United States historical reports. Other studies explore how college opportunity is influenced by characteristics of the high school attended, including parental involvement and the availability of college counselors and state-mandated testing. Her 2014 book, co-authored with Joni E. Finney, presented case studies of the relationship between public policy and higher education outcomes in five states and offered a conceptual framework for explaining how state policies influence higher education attainment for different groups. Stella Flores-Montgomery's review praised the book for its insights into how state policies can contribute to improved socioeconomic equity.

Perna has also conducted research on the potential roles of MOOCs, government-sponsored international student mobility programs, and free tuition or college promise programs in improving students' college outcomes. The edited volume, Preparing Today's Students for Tomorrow's Jobs in Metropolitan America, delved into the need to align education with evolving job requirements and emphasized the importance of preparing students for the dynamic demands of the modern workforce, while the edited Understanding the Working College Student shed light on the experiences of undergraduates who work for pay while enrolled. In her review, Loni Pazich Bordoloi of The Teagle Foundation praised The State of College Access and Completion, a volume co-edited with Anthony Jones, saying, "The volume comprehensively but succinctly discusses what is known and what is not known about a range of policy-relevant issues affecting underrepresented students in higher education."

Other scholarship has examined the use of higher education research to improve public policy and institutional practice. Using critical discourse analysis, Perna and co-authors examined how educational research has been used in Congressional legislative hearings about higher education policy. In Taking It to the Streets, she showcased how higher education scholars advocate for equity, inclusiveness, and social change. In his review, Lee University's Roy Y. Chan stated, that with this volume, "Laura W. Perna provides a comprehensive introduction to the central issues affecting higher education policy advocacy between academic researchers and policymakers."

Perna’s scholarship has also influenced broader discussions concerning the public purposes of higher education, democratic engagement, and the relationship between postsecondary education and economic mobility. Through her leadership of the Alliance for Higher Education and Democracy (AHEAD), she has examined how colleges and universities contribute to civic participation, social equity, and public policy development. More recent research has focused on College Promise and tuition-free college programs, evaluating their effectiveness in expanding educational opportunity and improving attainment outcomes for historically underrepresented populations. Her work has additionally explored international higher education systems, government-sponsored student mobility initiatives, and the relationship between workforce development and postsecondary attainment.

Beyond her own research contributions, Perna has played a role in shaping scholarship within the field of higher education as editor-in-chief of the ''Higher Education: Handbook of Theory and Research'' series. Under her editorial leadership, the series has published comprehensive reviews on topics including educational equity, higher education governance, academic freedom, college affordability, faculty diversity, institutional leadership, and public policy. Her publications have collectively received more than 20,000 citations, reflecting her influence on higher education research, policy analysis, and educational practice.

== Awards and honors ==
- 2010 – Christian R. and Mary F. Lindback Foundation Award for Distinguished Teaching, University of Pennsylvania
- 2011 – Robert P. Huff Golden Quill Award, National Association of Student Financial Aid Administrators
- 2014 – Fellow, American Educational Research Association
- 2017 – Excellence in Public Policy in Higher Education Award, Council on Public Policy in Higher Education
- 2017 – Dr. Constance Clayton Education Award, Philadelphia College Prep Roundtable
- 2019 – Elected Member, National Academy of Education
- 2020 – Recognition of Service Award, University of Pennsylvania Graduate School of Education
- 2021 – Distinguished Alumni Award, University of Michigan School of Education
- 2022 – Exemplary Research Award, Postsecondary Education Division of the American Education Research Association
- 2022 – Faculty Alumni Award of Merit, University of Pennsylvania Alumni Association

== Bibliography ==
=== Selected books and monographs ===
- Theoretical Perspectives on Student Success: Understanding the Contributions of the Disciplines (2008) ISBN 978-0470410783 (with Scott L. Thomas)
- The Attainment Agenda: State Policy Leadership in Higher Education (2014) ISBN 978-1421414065 (with Joni E. Finney)

=== Selected edited collections ===
- Understanding the working college student: New research and its implications for policy and practice (2010). ISBN 978-1003448495
- Preparing Today's Students for Tomorrow's Jobs in Metropolitan America (2012) ISBN 978-0812244533
- The State of College Access and Completion (2013) ISBN 978-0415660464 (with Anthony Jones)
- Taking It to the Streets: The Role of Scholarship in Advocacy and Advocacy in Scholarship 1st Edition (2018) ISBN 978-1421425467
- Improving Research-Based Knowledge of College Promise Programs (2020) ISBN 978-0935302783 (with Edward Smith)

=== Selected articles ===
- Perna, L. W. (2000). Differences in the decision to attend college among African Americans, Hispanics, and Whites. The Journal of Higher Education, 71(2), 117–141.
- Perna, L. W., & Titus, M. A. (2005). The relationship between parental involvement as social capital and college enrollment: An examination of racial/ethnic group differences. The journal of higher education, 76(5), 485–518.
- Perna, L. W. (2006). Studying college access and choice: A proposed conceptual model. In Higher education: Handbook of theory and research (pp. 99–157). Dordrecht: Springer Netherlands.
- Perna, L. W., Ruby, A., Boruch, R. F., Wang, N., Scull, J., Ahmad, S., & Evans, C. (2014). Moving through MOOCs: Understanding the progression of users in massive open online courses. Educational Researcher, 43(9), 421–432.
- Perna, L. W., Orosz, K., Gopaul, B., Jumakulov, Z., Ashirbekov, A., & Kishkentayeva, M. (2014). Promoting human capital development: A typology of international scholarship programs in higher education. Educational Researcher, 43(2), 63–73.
- Perna, L. W., Orosz, K., & Kent, D. C. (2019). The role and contribution of academic researchers in congressional hearings: A critical discourse analysis. American Educational Research Journal, 56(1), 111–145.
- Perna, L.W., Wright-Kim, J., & Leigh, E. (2020). Is a college promise program an effective use of resources? Understanding the implications of program design and resource investments for equity and efficiency. AERA Open, 6(4), 1–15.
