= Alfredo Rodríguez Dávila =

Mexican politician

- Born: 12 August 1969 (age 56); Monterrey, Nuevo León, Mexico
- Occupation: Politician
- Political party: PAN

Alfredo Javier Rodríguez Dávila (born 12 August 1969) is a Mexican politician from the National Action Party (PAN). In the 2009 mid-terms he was elected to the Chamber of Deputies to represent Nuevo León's 10th district during the 61st session of Congress.
