= Eloise Marais =

Atmospheric Chemist

Eloise Ann Marais
- Education: Harvard University; Rhodes University; University of KwaZulu-Natal
- Scientific career
- Workplaces: Harvard University; University College London
- Thesis: Non-methane volatile organic compounds in Africa: a view from space (2014)

Eloise Ann Marais is a British/South African Atmospheric Chemist who is a professor at University College London. She leads the UCL Atmospheric Composition and Air Quality group, which develop complex models to understand human influence on air quality.

== Early life and education ==
Marais was born in South Africa. She studied chemistry and applied chemistry at the University of KwaZulu-Natal for her undergraduate degree, before moving to Rhodes University for an MSc in physical and analytical chemistry. She was awarded an International Fulbright Science and Technology Award and completed her doctorate at Harvard University. Her doctoral research used satellite observations and chemical transport models to quantify air pollutant precursor emissions of volatile organic compounds across Africa. Marais spent two years at Harvard as a postdoctoral researcher. She joined the University of Birmingham in 2016, where she developed tools for air monitoring in urban environments. and established the Atmospheric Composition and Air Quality research group.

== Research and career ==
In 2018, Marais joined Leicester as an associate professor. She spent two years in Leicester before moving to University College London, where she studied the impact of fossil fuel emissions on human health. Her research has shown that fossil fuel emissions accounted for 18% of deaths around the world in 2018, and that regions with the highest concentrations of fossil fuels in the air had the highest rates of mortality.

Marais was awarded a European Research Council grant to understand the understudied upper troposphere using multi-modal data. There are uncertainties in the composition of the upper troposphere, and limited understanding of how it influences climate and air quality. She has studied how space tourism impacts the climate. She ran a 10-year simulation to understand how rocket emissions compared with traditional sources of carbon dioxide, finding space tourism undermined environmental efforts on planet Earth. Her research showed that a SpaceX launch emitted one hundred times more carbon dioxide than a traditional transatlantic flight, and that these pollutants could destroy the ozone if injected into the stratospheric ozone layer. She showed that this could persist for two or more years.

Marais has ongoing projects to measures the atmosphere above Central London, develop inventories and derive new data sets from satellite observations. She worked as a researcher in residence with the Connected Places Catapult, where she developed tools to better understand the city environment. She has used Multi-Axis Differential Optical Absorption Spectroscopy to evaluate the presence of nitrogen dioxide and formaldehyde. Marias was supported by the Department for Environment, Food and Rural Affairs to understand air pollution above Leicester. In 2024 she was promoted to Professor at University College London.

== Selected publications ==
- Karn Vohra; Alina Vodonos; Joel Schwartz; Eloise A. Marais; Melissa P Sulprizio; Loretta J. Mickley (April 2021). "Global mortality from outdoor fine particle pollution generated by fossil fuel combustion: Results from GEOS-Chem". Environmental Research. 195 110754. doi:10.1016/J.ENVRES.2021.110754. ISSN 0013-9351.
- Hannah M. Horowitz; Daniel J. Jacob; Yanxu Zhang; et al. (17 January 2017). "A new mechanism for atmospheric mercury redox chemistry: Implications for the global mercury budget". Atmospheric Chemistry and Physics Discussions: 1–33. doi:10.5194/ACP-2016-1165. ISSN 1680-7375.
- Qiaoqiao Wang; Daniel J. Jacob; J. Ryan Spackman; et al. (14 January 2014). "Global budget and radiative forcing of black carbon aerosol: Constraints from pole-to-pole (HIPPO) observations across the Pacific". Journal of Geophysical Research: Atmospheres. 119 (1): 195–206. Bibcode:2014JGRD..119..195W. doi:10.1002/2013JD020824. ISSN 2169-897X.
