= Alberto Coronado Quintanilla =

Mexican politician

- Born: 3 December 1963 (age 62); Monterrey, Nuevo León, Mexico
- Occupation: Politician
- Political party: PAN

Alberto Coronado Quintanilla (born 3 December 1963) is a Mexican politician affiliated with the National Action Party (PAN). In the federal 2012 general election he was elected to the Chamber of Deputies to represent Nuevo León's 6th district during the 62nd session of Congress.
