= Juan Enrique Barrios Rodríguez =

Mexican politician

- Born: 31 March 1973 (age 53); Nuevo León, Mexico
- Occupation: Politician
- Political party: PAN

Juan Enrique Barrios Rodríguez (born 31 July 1973) is a Mexican politician affiliated with the National Action Party (PAN). In the 2006 general election he was elected to the Chamber of Deputies to represent Nuevo León's 6th district during the 60th session of Congress.
