= 10th federal electoral district of Nuevo León =

Federal electoral district of Mexico

Nuevo León's 10th
- Electoral district of the Chamber of Deputies of Mexico

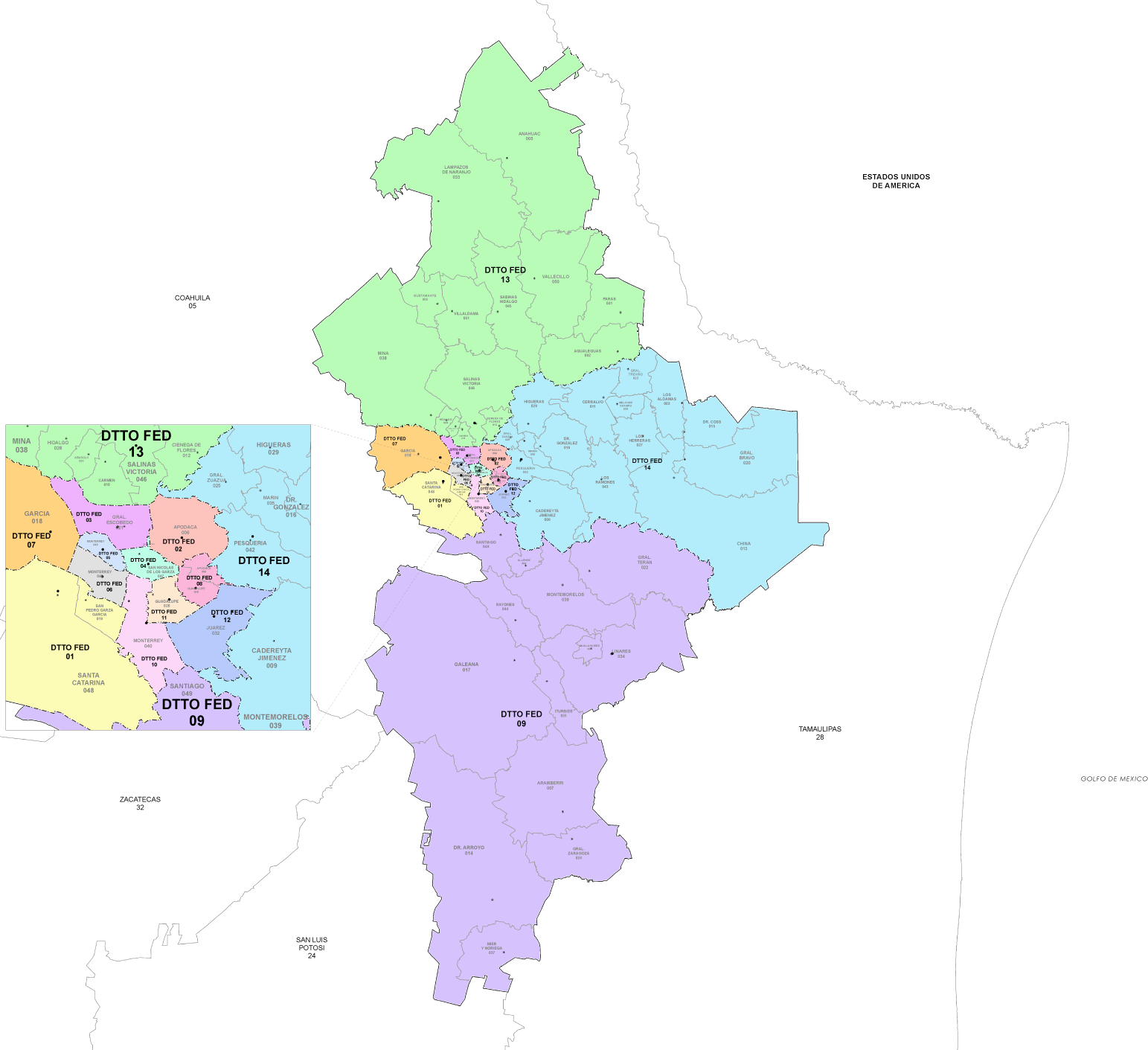
- 10th district

Incumbent
- Member: Ana González González
- Party: ▌Institutional Revolutionary Party
- Congress: 66th (2024–2027)

District
- State: Nuevo León
- Head town: Monterrey
- Coordinates: 25°41′N 100°19′W
- Covers: Municipality of Monterrey (part)
- PR region: Second
- Precincts: 317
- Population: 380,565 (2020 census)

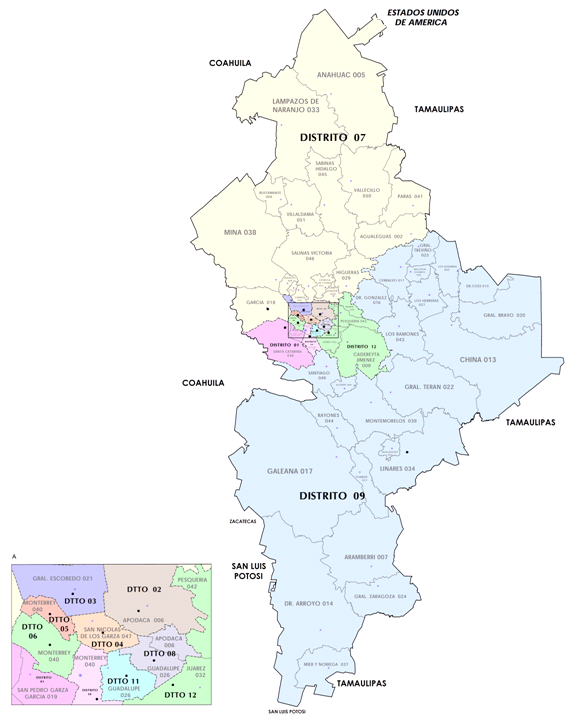
Nuevo León's districts in 2017–2022

The 10th federal electoral district of Nuevo León (Spanish: Distrito electoral federal 10 de Nuevo León) is one of the 300 electoral districts into which Mexico is divided for elections to the federal Chamber of Deputies and one of 14 such districts in the state of Nuevo León.

It elects one deputy to the lower house of Congress for each three-year legislative session by means of the first-past-the-post system. Votes cast in the district also count towards the calculation of proportional representation ("plurinominal") deputies elected from the second region.

The 10th district was created by the 1977 electoral reforms and was first contested in the 1979 mid-term election.

The current member for the district, elected in the 2024 general election, is Ana Isabel González González of the Institutional Revolutionary Party (PRI).

== District territory ==
In its 2022 districting plan, which is to be used for the 2024, 2027 and 2030 federal elections, the National Electoral Institute (INE) increased Nuevo León's congressional seat allocation from 12 to 14. The reconfigured 10th district covers 317 electoral precincts (secciones electorales) in the municipality of Monterrey. (Note: The remainder of Monterrey is assigned to the 5th and 6th districts.)

The head town (cabecera distrital), where results from individual polling stations are gathered together and tallied, is the state capital, the city of Monterrey. The district reported a population of 380,565 in the 2020 census.

== Previous districting schemes ==
Evolution of electoral district numbers
	1974	1978	1996	2005	2017	2023
Nuevo León	7	11	11	12	12	14
Chamber of Deputies	196	300				

2017–2022

Between 2017 and 2022, the district covered 355 precincts in the municipality of Monterrey.

2005–2017

Under the 2005 districting plan, the district covered 182 precincts in the centre and south of the municipality of Monterrey.

1996–2005

From 1996 to 2005, the district covered 169 precincts in the centre and south of the municipality of Monterrey.

1978–1996

The districting scheme in force from 1978 to 1996 was the result of the 1977 electoral reforms, which increased the number of single-member seats in the Chamber of Deputies from 196 to 300. Under that plan, Nuevo León's seat allocation rose from 7 to 11. The newly created 10th district's head town was at San Nicolás de los Garza and it covered that city and its surrounding municipality.

== Deputies returned to Congress ==
(Mexico) National parties
- Current
- PAN
- PRI
- PT
- PVEM
- MC
- Morena
- PAZ
- Somos
- Defunct or local only
- PLM
- PNR
- PRM
- PNM
- PP
- PPS
- PARM
- PFCRN
- CON
- PANAL
- PSD
- PES
- PES
- PRD

Nuevo León's 10th district
Election	Deputy	Party	Term	Legislature
1979	Adalberto Núñez Galaviz	National Action Party (Mexico)	1979–1982	51st Congress
1982	Luis Eugenio Todd	Institutional Revolutionary Party	1982–1985	52nd Congress
1985	Rolando Castillo Gamboa	Institutional Revolutionary Party	1985–1988	53rd Congress
1988	Yolanda Minerva García Treviño	Institutional Revolutionary Party	1988–1991	54th Congress
1991	Rogelio Villarreal Garza	Institutional Revolutionary Party	1991–1994	55th Congress
1994	Víctor Cruz Ramírez	National Action Party (Mexico)	1994–1997	56th Congress
1997	Roberto Ramírez Villarreal	National Action Party (Mexico)	1997–2000	57th Congress
2000	Orlando Alfonso García Flores	National Action Party (Mexico)	2000–2003	58th Congress
2003	Margarita Martínez López	Institutional Revolutionary Party	2003–2006	59th Congress
2006	Juan Manuel Villanueva Arjona	National Action Party (Mexico)	2006–2009	60th Congress
2009	Alfredo Javier Rodríguez Dávila	National Action Party (Mexico)	2009–2012	61st Congress
2012	Fernando Alejandro Larrazábal Bretón	National Action Party (Mexico)	2012–2015	62nd Congress
2015	Juan Carlos Ruiz García	National Action Party (Mexico)	2015–2018	63rd Congress
2018	José Martín López Cisneros	National Action Party (Mexico)	2018–2021	64th Congress
2021	Karina Marlen Barrón Perales	Institutional Revolutionary Party	2021–2024	65th Congress
2024	Ana Isabel González González	Institutional Revolutionary Party	2024–2027	66th Congress

== Presidential elections ==
Nuevo León's 10th district
Election	District won by	Party or coalition	%
2018	Ricardo Anaya Cortés	Por México al Frente	44.3457
2024	Bertha Xóchitl Gálvez Ruiz	Fuerza y Corazón por México	54.5818
