= John Fantuzzo =

Professor

John Fantuzzo is the Albert M. Greenfield Professor of Human Relations at the University of Pennsylvania Graduate School of Education and the Faculty Director of the Penn Child Research Center.

== Awards ==
He is a recipient of the Martin Luther King Jr. Community Involvement Award and the National Head Start Research Mentor Award.

== Career ==
Fantuzzo has been a faculty member at Penn since 1988, where he has worked extensively with the School District of Philadelphia's early childhood education programs. Fantuzzo's research and work focus on the design, implementation, and evaluation of school- and community-based strategies that benefit low-income children in high-risk urban settings. He has conducted multiple studies, some with the National Head Start Program, that research the effect of community and family violence on school readiness, the influence of social/emotional adjustment problems on educational success, and early childhood education.

Fantuzzo worked on the development of integrated citywide databases for agencies that serve young children, such as the Kids Integrated Data System or KIDS database, a Philadelphia-area database that is one of the only municipal databases of its kind. Fantuzzo is also a principal investigator of EPIC, or Evidence-Based Program for the Integration of Curricula, a Head Start program for disadvantage and at-risk preschoolers. EPIC integrates social, emotional, and cognitive supports with literacy and numeracy education and is being implemented at several preschools in Philadelphia. Fantuzzo also serves on the editorial boards of research journals in education and early childhood, including the Journal of Educational Psychology, Early Childhood Research Quarterly, and School Psychology Review.

== Research ==
In 2009 Fantuzzo presented the Albert M. Greenfield Memorial Lecture, a review of research findings titled "The Educational Well-Being of African American Boys: A Philadelphia Story of Challenges and Possibilities."

== Education ==
Fantuzzo holds a B.A. in psychology from Marietta College (1974), an M.A. in theology from the Fuller Theological Seminary (1976), and a Ph.D. in Clinical Psychology from the Fuller Graduate School of Psychology (1980). In 1990, Fantuzzo received an honorary M.A. from the University of Pennsylvania.
