= 6th federal electoral district of Nuevo León =

Federal electoral district of Mexico

Nuevo León's 6th
- Electoral district of the Chamber of Deputies of Mexico

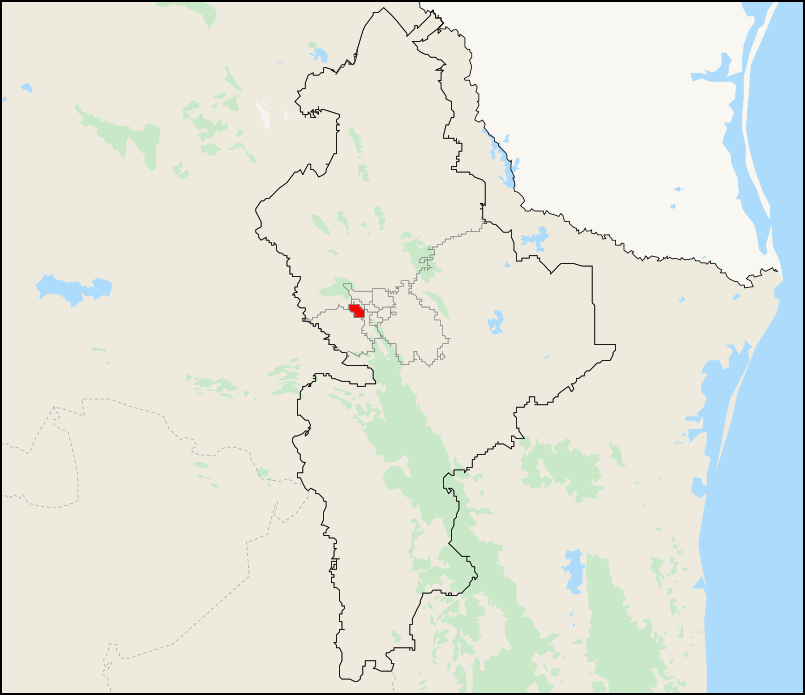

Incumbent
- Member: Annia Gómez Cárdenas
- Party: ▌National Action Party
- Congress: 66th (2024–2027)

District
- State: Nuevo León
- Head town: Monterrey
- Coordinates: 25°41′N 100°19′W
- Covers: Municipality of Monterrey (part)
- PR region: Second
- Precincts: 272
- Population: 375,283 (2020 census)

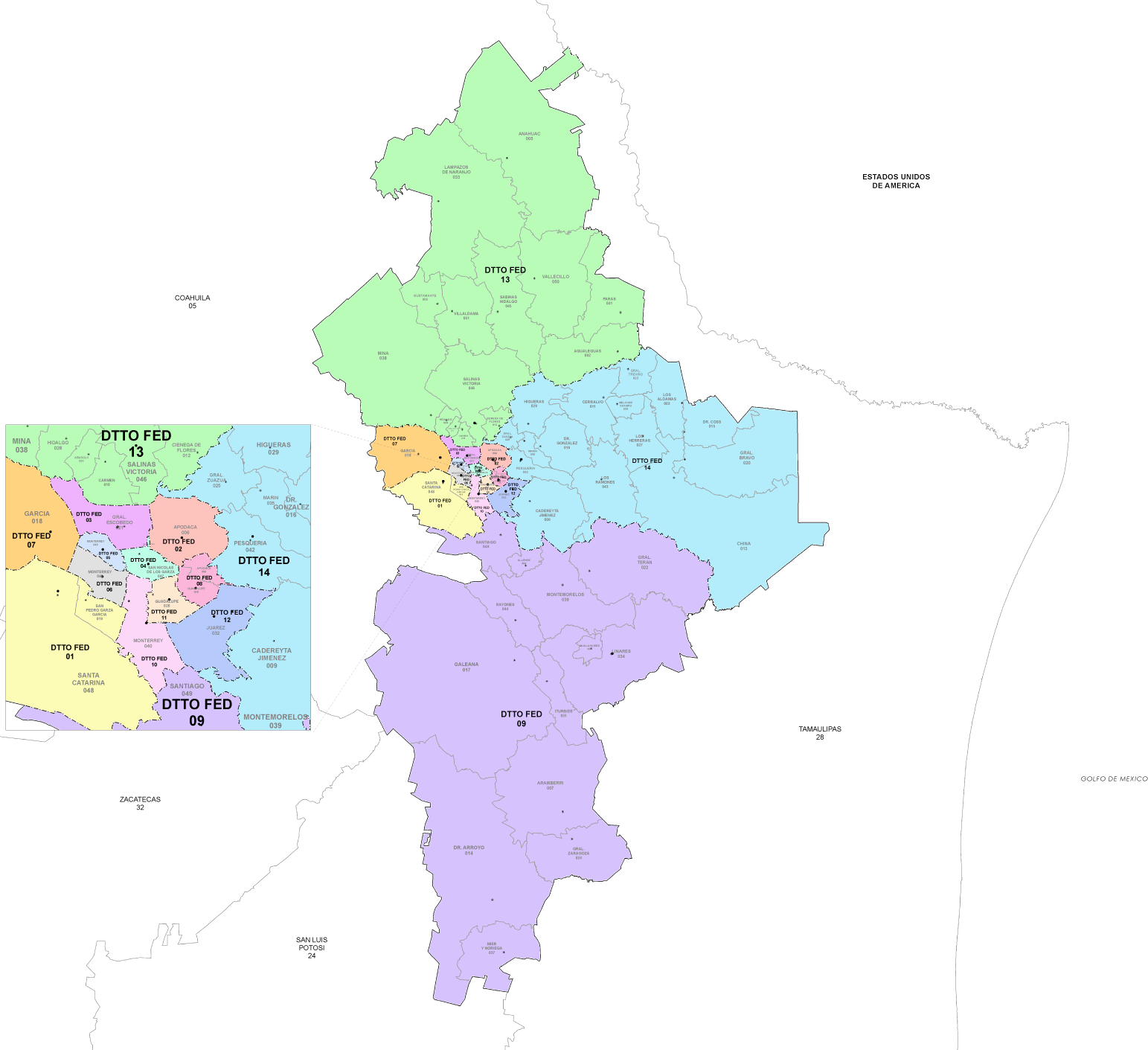
Nuevo León under the 2023 districting plan

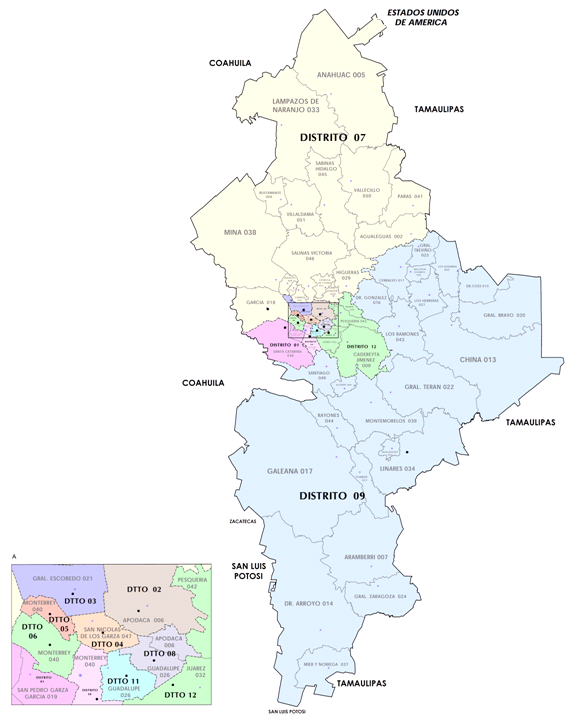
Nuevo León's districts in 2017–2022

The 6th federal electoral district of Nuevo León (Spanish: Distrito electoral federal 06 de Nuevo León) is one of the 300 electoral districts into which Mexico is divided for elections to the federal Chamber of Deputies and one of 14 such districts in the state of Nuevo León.

It elects one deputy to the lower house of Congress for each three-year legislative session by means of the first-past-the-post system. Votes cast in the district also count towards the calculation of proportional representation ("plurinominal") deputies elected from the second region.

The current member for the district, re-elected in the 2024 general election, is Annia Gómez Cárdenas of the National Action Party (PAN).

== District territory ==
Under the 2023 districting plan adopted by the National Electoral Institute (INE), which is to be used for the 2024, 2027 and 2030 federal elections, Nuevo León's congressional seat allocation rose from 12 to 14. The sixth district is in the centre of the Monterrey metropolitan area and covers 272 electoral precincts (secciones electorales) in the central-western portion of the municipality of Monterrey. (Note: The remainder of Monterrey is assigned to the 5th and 10th districts.)

The district's head town (cabecera distrital), where results from individual polling stations are gathered together and tallied, is the state capital, the city of Monterrey. The district reported a population of 375,283 in the 2020 census.

== Previous districting schemes ==
Evolution of electoral district numbers
	1974	1978	1996	2005	2017	2023
Nuevo León	7	11	11	12	12	14
Chamber of Deputies	196	300				

2017–2022

Between 2017 and 2022, the district comprised 270 precincts in the centre-west of the municipality of Monterrey, with the remainder assigned to the 5th and 10th districts.

2005–2017

Under the 2005 districting plan, the district covered the centre-west of Monterrey, with the remainder of the municipality assigned to the 5th, 7th and 10th districts.

1996–2005

From 1996 to 2005, the district covered the centre-west of Monterrey, with the remainder of the municipality assigned to the 5th, 7th and 10th districts.

1978–1996

The districting scheme in force from 1978 to 1996 was the result of the 1977 electoral reforms, which increased the number of single-member seats in the Chamber of Deputies from 196 to 300. Under that plan, Nuevo León's seat allocation rose from 7 to 11. The 6th district had its head town at Sabinas Hidalgo in the north of the state and it comprised the municipalities of Abasolo, Agualeguas, Los Aldamas, Anáhuac, Apodaca, Bustamante, El Carmen, Cerralvo, Ciénaga de Flores, China, Doctor Coss, Doctor González, General Bravo, General Escobedo, General Treviño, General Zuazua, Los Herreras, Hidalgo, Higueras, Juárez, Lampazos de Naranjo, Marín, Melchor Ocampo, Mina, Parás, Pesquería, Los Ramones, Sabinas Hidalgo, Salinas Victoria, Vallecillo, Villaldama and Colombia.

== Deputies returned to Congress ==
(Mexico) National parties
- Current
- PAN
- PRI
- PT
- PVEM
- MC
- Morena
- PAZ
- Somos
- Defunct or local only
- PLM
- PNR
- PRM
- PNM
- PP
- PPS
- PARM
- PFCRN
- CON
- PANAL
- PSD
- PES
- PES
- PRD

Nuevo León's 6th district
Election	Deputy	Party	Term	Legislature
1916	Agustín Garza González		1916–1917	Constituent Congress of Querétaro
...
1979	Luis Marcelino Farías Martínez	Institutional Revolutionary Party	1979–1982	51st Congress
1982	Jorge Alonso Treviño Martínez	Institutional Revolutionary Party	1982–1985	52nd Congress
1985	Graciano Bortoni Urteaga	Institutional Revolutionary Party	1985–1988	53rd Congress
1988	Napoleón Cantú Cerna	Institutional Revolutionary Party	1988–1991	54th Congress
1991	Arturo de la Garza Jr. González; Jaime de la Garza Guzmán	Institutional Revolutionary Party	1991–1994	55th Congress
1994	César González Quiroga	Institutional Revolutionary Party	1994–1997	56th Congress
1997	Julio Castrillón Valdés	National Action Party (Mexico)	1997–2000	57th Congress
2000	Francisco Javier Cantú Torres	National Action Party (Mexico)	2000–2003	58th Congress
2003	Mayela María de Lourdes Quiroga Tamez	Institutional Revolutionary Party	2003–2006	59th Congress
2006	Juan Enrique Barrios Rodríguez	National Action Party (Mexico)	2006–2009	60th Congress
2009	Gregorio Hurtado Leija	National Action Party (Mexico)	2009–2012	61st Congress
2012	Alberto Coronado Quintanilla	National Action Party (Mexico)	2012–2015	62nd Congress
2015	José Adrián González Navarro	National Action Party (Mexico)	2015–2018	63rd Congress
2018	Annia Sarahí Gómez Cárdenas	National Action Party (Mexico)	2018–2021	64th Congress
2021	Annia Sarahí Gómez Cárdenas	National Action Party (Mexico)	2021–2024	65th Congress
2024	Annia Sarahí Gómez Cárdenas	National Action Party (Mexico)	2024–2027	66th Congress

== Presidential elections ==
Nuevo León's 6th district
Election	District won by	Party or coalition	%
2018	Ricardo Anaya Cortés	Por México al Frente	44.0391
2024	Bertha Xóchitl Gálvez Ruiz	Fuerza y Corazón por México	56.5158
