= Jonathan Zimmerman =

American historian of education

Academic background
- Education: Columbia University (BA); Johns Hopkins University (MA, PhD)

Academic work
- Discipline: History of education
- Institutions: New York University; University of Pennsylvania

Jonathan Zimmerman is an American historian of education who is a professor of history of education at the University of Pennsylvania Graduate School of Education.

== Career ==
Zimmerman graduated from Columbia College in 1983, where he was the editor-in-chief of Columbia Daily Spectator. He earned an M.A. in history in 1990, and a Ph.D. in history in 1993, both from Johns Hopkins University. He taught for 20 years at New York University, where he was chair of the Department of Humanities and Social Sciences in NYU’s Steinhardt School of Culture, Education, and Human Development.

Though being a social liberal, he champions unrestricted freedom of speech for all, including conservatives.

== Works ==
- Zimmerman, Jonathan (April 20, 1999). Distilling Democracy: Alcohol Education in America's Public Schools, 1880–1925. University Press of Kansas. ISBN 978-0700609451.
- Zimmerman, Jonathan (November 30, 2005). Whose America? Culture Wars in the Public Schools. Harvard University Press. ISBN 978-0-674-04544-6.
- Zimmerman, Jonathan (October 31, 2006). Innocents Abroad: American Teachers in the American Century. Harvard University Press. ISBN 978-0674023611.
- Zimmerman, Jonathan (February 22, 2015). Too Hot to Handle: A Global History of Sex Education. Princeton University Press. ISBN 978-0-691-17366-5.
- Zimmerman, Jonathan (September 7, 2016). Campus Politics: What Everyone Needs to Know® (1st ed.). Oxford University Press. ISBN 978-0190627393.
- Zimmerman, Jonathan; Robertson, Emily (April 24, 2017). The Case for Contention: Teaching Controversial Issues in American Schools. University of Chicago Press. ISBN 978-0226456201.
- Zimmerman, Jonathan (October 27, 2020). The Amateur Hour: A History of College Teaching in America. Johns Hopkins University Press. ISBN 978-1421439099.
- Zimmerman, Jonathan (April 1, 2021). Free Speech: And Why You Should Give a Damn. Illustrated by Signe Wilkinson. City of Light Publishing. ISBN 978-1952536106.
- Zimmerman, Jonathan (August 26, 2022). Whose America?: Culture Wars in the Public Schools. University of Chicago Press. ISBN 978-0226820392.
