= Monterrey Municipality =

Coordinates: 25.5768°N 100.2839°W

- Municipality
- Flag Coat of arms

- Location of the state of Nuevo León within Mexico

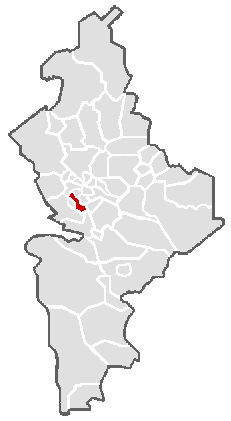
- Country: Mexico
- State: Nuevo León
- Municipal seat: City of Monterrey
- Largest City: City of Monterrey
- GDP (2024): $111.3 billon
- Per capita: $97,410

Government
  - Municipal president: Adrián de la Garza
  - Federal electoral district: NL-5, NL-6, NL-10

Area
  - Total: 323.6 km^{2} (124.9 sq mi)

Population
  - Total: 1,142,994
  - Density: 3,532/km^{2} (9,148/sq mi)

Monterrey Municipality is one of the 51 subdivisions of the State of Nuevo León, Mexico. Its municipal seat is located in the City of Monterrey.

The municipal government is headed by the municipal president of Monterrey (mayor of Monterrey).
