= Peter Zemsky =

American-French academic

- Education: University of Pennsylvania; Stanford Graduate School of Business
- Occupation: Academic
- Known for: Former Deputy Dean at INSEAD
- Children: 4

Peter Zemsky is an American-French academic. He is the Eli Lilly Chaired Professor of Strategy at INSEAD, where he was formerly the Deputy Dean/Dean of Innovation(2013-2023).

== Early life ==
Zemsky is the oldest child of Robert Zemsky and Ann Zemsky. He grew up in Philadelphia, and attended Germantown Friends School. Zemsky graduated from the University of Pennsylvania, where he earned a bachelor of arts degree in economics in 1988, and he earned a PhD from the Stanford Graduate School of Business in 1995.

== Career ==
Zemsky joined INSEAD as an assistant professor in 1994. He was a visiting professor at the Wharton School of the University of Pennsylvania in 2003. In 2011, he was appointed as the deputy dean for degree programmes and curriculum. In October 2013, he was appointed as the deputy dean of INSEAD and Dean for Strategic Initiatives and Innovation. Zemsky has published academic articles in the American Economic Review, the RAND Journal of Economics, the Strategic Management Journal, and Management Science.

== Personal life ==
Zemsky is a dual US-French citizen. He has four children.
