= University of Pennsylvania Graduate School of Education =

American education graduate university

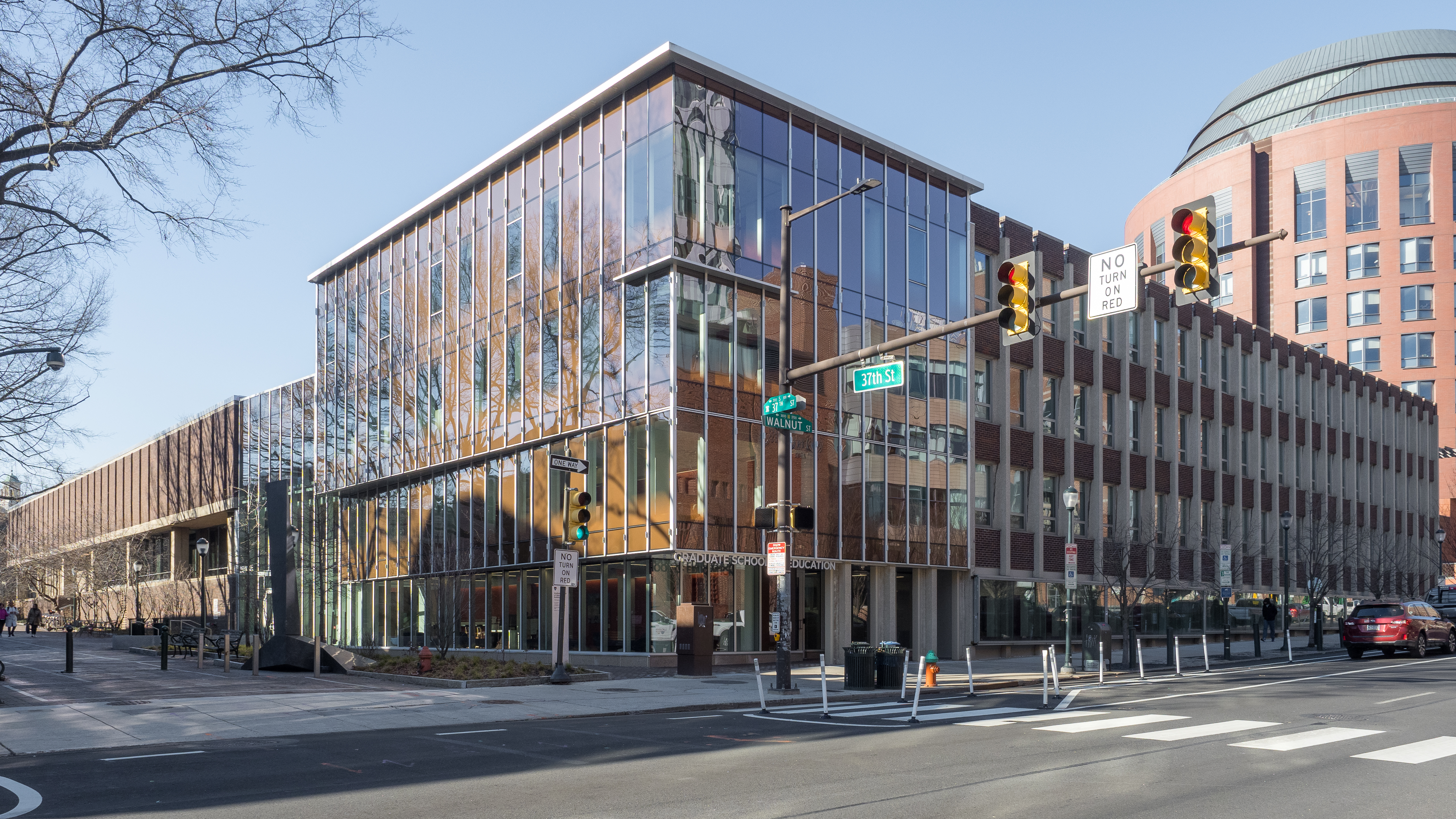
- Motto: Leges sine moribus vanae
- Motto in English: Laws without morals are in vain
- Type: Private
- Established: 1915
- Founder: Frank Pierrepont Graves
- Parent institution: University of Pennsylvania
- Dean: Katharine Strunk
- Academic staff: 40
- Students: 1300
- Location: 3700 Walnut Street, Philadelphia, PA, 19104, USA; 39.95323°N 75.19722°W
- Campus: Urban
- Website: www.gse.upenn.edu

The University of Pennsylvania Graduate School of Education, commonly known as Penn GSE, is the education school of University of Pennsylvania, a private Ivy League research university in Philadelphia, Pennsylvania. Formally established as a department in 1893 and a school at the University of Pennsylvania in 1915, Penn GSE has historically had research strengths in teaching and learning, the cultural contexts of education, language education, human development, quantitative research methods, and practitioner inquiry. Katharine Strunk is the current dean of Penn GSE; she succeeded Pam Grossman in 2023.

== History ==
From its earliest days, the University of Pennsylvania has prepared teachers to lead the schools of the country. This was a primary purpose of Benjamin Franklin's Public Academy of Philadelphia, and it has continued to influence the work of the University throughout its history. Education classes were first held at Penn in 1893, and a professorship in education was created two years later in 1895. The full-fledged school of education was established as a separate school within the university in 1914, initially conferring only Bachelor of Science in Education degrees. The school of education conferred its first Bachelor of Science in Education degrees in 1915 on three men and three women. The school quickly embraced the necessity of research on education practices, and instituted Master of Science in Education and Doctor of Education degree programs in 1930 and 1943, respectively. Since then, Penn GSE has grown to include Master of Philosophy in Education, Doctor of Education, and Doctor of Philosophy in Education programs and house several departments, centers, and initiatives.

== Facilities ==
When the school was founded, its offices and classrooms were located in College Hall, one of the first buildings of Penn's West Philadelphia campus. Its library was located in Fisher-Bennett Hall but was soon merged into Van Pelt Library. In 1940, GSE moved to Eisenlohr Hall, located a few blocks west on Walnut Street. Penn acquired additional space in the rowhouse next door, which was known as the Eisenlohr Annex Building.

Penn GSE moved into the Education Building, where it still is today, in 1966. Currently, Eisenlohr Hall serves as the President's house and the Eisenlohr Annex is home to Penn's creative writing center.

== Academics ==
Penn GSE offers 20 different master's degrees in programs ranging from Higher Education to Counseling and Mental Health Services. It also offers 15 doctorate degrees, in both education and philosophy. Programs include:

- Education Entrepreneurship M.S.Ed.
- Education Policy M.S.Ed
- Education Policy Ph.D.
- Education, Culture, and Society M.S.Ed.
- Education, Culture, and Society Ph.D.
- Educational Linguistics Ed.D.
- Educational Linguistics Ph.D.
- Executive Doctorate in Higher Education Management Ed.D.
- Global Higher Education Management M.S.Ed. (Online)
- Higher Education Ed.D.
- Higher Education M.S.Ed.
- Higher Education Ph.D.
- Independent School Teaching Residency M.S.Ed.
- Interdisciplinary Studies in Human Development M.S.Ed.
- Interdisciplinary Studies in Human Development Ph.D.
- International Educational Development M.S.Ed.
- Learning Analytics and Artificial Intelligence M.S.Ed. (Online)
- Learning Sciences and Technologies M.S.Ed.
- Learning Sciences and Technologies Ph.D.
- Literacy Studies Ed.D.
- Literacy Studies M.S.Ed.
- Literacy Studies Ph.D.
- Medical Education M.S.Ed.
- Mid-Career Doctoral Program in Educational Leadership Ed.D.
- Penn Chief Learning Officer Ed.D.
- Professional Counseling, M.Phil.Ed.
- Quantitative Methods M.Phil.Ed.
- Quantitative Methods Ph.D.
- Reading Specialist - Certification
- School and Mental Health Counseling M.S.Ed.
- School Leadership M.S.Ed.
- Statistics, Measurement, Assessment, and Research Technology M.S.Ed.
- Teaching English to Speakers of Other Languages (TESOL) M.S.Ed.
- Teaching, Learning, and Leadership M.S.Ed.
- Teaching, Learning, and Teacher Education Ed.D.
- Teaching, Learning, and Teacher Education Ph.D.
- Urban Education (Online) M.S.Ed.
- Urban Teaching Apprenticeship M.S.Ed.
- Urban Teaching Residency M.S.Ed. with Certification(s)

== Research ==
Penn GSE offers a wide variety of degree programs in education research and practice. Students prepare to become educational leaders, aspiring to have careers in urban and international education, school leadership, education research, higher education administration, school psychology, and more. There are currently six academic divisions at Penn GSE: Human Development and Quantitative Methods; Literacy, Culture, and International Education; Education Policy; Educational Linguistics; Higher Education; and Teaching, Learning, and Leadership.

Urban education is one of Penn GSE's central research interests. GSE partners with several schools in its West Philadelphia neighborhood, including the Sadie Tanner Mossell Alexander Penn Partnership School and others. They also engage in professional development for local educators as well as in applied research, developing programs like KIDS and EPIC.

In 2001, Penn GSE launched a series of executive degree programs for education professionals and entrepreneurial activities that serve non-traditional students. These programs have grown to include the Executive Program in Education Entrepreneurship; Executive Program in School and Mental Health Counseling; Executive Doctorate in Higher Education Management; School Leadership Program (Principal Certification); Penn Chief Learning Officer Program; Medical Education Program; Mid-Career Doctoral Program in Educational Leadership and Urban Residency Teaching Program. In 2010, Penn GSE launched the Milken-Penn GSE Education Business Plan Competition, a competition that encourages entrepreneurship and innovation in education.

Penn GSE also works internationally, engaging in multinational research projects, partnerships, study abroad programs, and consulting projects.

== Notable Faculty and Staff ==
- Angela Duckworth
- John Fantuzzo
- Vivian Gadsden
- Yasmin Kafai
- Laura Perna
- Andrew Porter
- Deborah A. Thomas
- Robert Zemsky
- Jonathan Zimmerman

== Notable alumni ==
- Mary Pat Clarke — American politician
- Constance Clayton — American educator
- Eloise Lewis — the first dean of the School of Nursing at the University of North Carolina at Greensboro
- Teresa P. Pica — professor, notable for her work in task-based language learning
- Nelly Toll — Polish-born American artist, writer, and teacher
- Pauline A. Young — African-American teacher, librarian, historian, and humanitarian
- Margaret Wettlin — American-born Soviet memoirist and translator, known for her translations of Russian literature
- Julie Wollman — American academic administrator, 10th president of Widener University
