= Juan Manuel Villanueva Arjona =

Mexican politician

- Born: 27 January 1966 (age 60); Nuevo León, Mexico
- Occupation: Politician
- Political party: PAN

Juan Manuel Villanueva Arjona (born 27 January 1966) is a Mexican politician affiliated with the National Action Party (PAN). In the 2006 general election he was elected to the Chamber of Deputies to represent Nuevo León's 10th district during the 60th session of Congress.
