= Nelly Toll =

Polish Jewish artist, writer, and teacher (1932–2021)

Nelly Toll (née Landau) (19 April 1932 – 30 January 2021) was a Polish-born American Jewish artist, writer, and teacher, and was a survivor of the Holocaust. Toll, and her mother Rose, were the only members of their family to survive the Holocaust, and spent over eighteen months in hiding during 1943 and 1944. Toll's childhood water color paintings, in which she recorded her experiences of the Holocaust form a significant record of the period. They are archived in museums in the United States and Israel, and have been exhibited internationally, as well as being recorded in the form of a book by Toll. As an adult, Toll immigrated to the United States and settled there, teaching art and the history of the Holocaust at the University of Pennsylvania Graduate School of Education.

== Life ==
Nelly Landau was born in Lwów (now Lviv) on 19 April 1932, to a family of Polish Jews. Her family was expelled from their home to the Lwów Ghetto during the German occupation of the city in 1941, and during their time there, her five year old brother was killed. After an unsuccessful attempt to flee to Hungary, Toll and her mother Rose were taken in by Polish Catholic friends of her father, while he remained in the ghetto with the rest of their family. They spent most of 1943 and 1944 in hiding, in the home of these friends. Toll and her mother hid from patrols behind a bricked-up window, concealed by a hanging rug. During this period, Toll, aged eight, painted a significant number of water color images depicting her experiences and thoughts. After the liberation of Lviv, Toll and her mother were the only surviving members of their family, and they moved to Europe, where Toll studied art. Toll and her mother immigrated to the United States of America in 1951, where she completed her education and married Ervin Toll, with whom she had several children. Toll died at the age of 88, in New Jersey, of cardiac arrhythmia.

== Work ==
Toll studied art at Rutgers University, and at the Academy of Fine Art in Philadelphia. She went on to earn a doctorate at the University of Pennsylvania Graduate School of Education, with a dissertation on Holocaust art and education. She later taught a course in Holocaust literature in the same department, and continued to paint as an adult, as well as engage in public efforts to teach the history of the Holocaust.

As a child, while she and her mother were in hiding, Toll's mother had given her a set of water colors to distract her. Eight year old Toll painted over 65 water colors recording her experiences and her visions of life outside their place of refuge, often writing accompanying stories about her imaginary life depicted in the art. Her art contained reinterpretations of traumatic childhood events, such as a painting depicting a luxurious bath for herself and her mother, after they hid in a bathtub during air raids.

Toll's childhood art work, consisting of water color paintings recording her experiences of the Holocaust, is considered a significant record of the history of the Holocaust. It has been archived as a part of the collections of the Yad Vashem museum in Israel, and is also part of the permanent displays at the United States Holocaust Memorial Museum and the Illinois Holocaust Museum and Education Center. In 2014, Toll's childhood art work was exhibited individually at the Massillon Museum, with the title, 'Imagining a Better World: The Artwork of Nelly Toll." In 2016, her art was exhibited at the Deutsches Historische Museum, as one of a group of works of Jewish art created during the Holocaust. The exhibition was notable, in part because more than half the creators of the art being exhibited, did not survive the Holocaust. As the only still-living artist whose work was part of the exhibition, Toll opened the exhibition with Chancellor Angela Merkel, speaking of the significance of the art and of remembering the Holocaust. Her art and her opening lecture attracted a significant amount of press.

Her adult art work has been exhibited in the United States and Belgium. As an adult, she moved from working in water color to painting largely in acrylic.

== Publications ==
Toll published a memoir about her life, titled Behind the Secret Window: A Memoir of a Hidden Childhood During World War Two in 2003, which included images of her childhood art work and stories. She later adapted her memoir for the stage, and it received several professional productions. Toll has written several books about Holocaust art, and a fictional book titled Behind the Hidden Walls. Her publications include:

- Nelly Toll, Beyond the Hidden Walls (2013) ISBN 9-781-60862-4966, 1-608-62496-X
- Nelly Toll, Behind the Secret Window: A Memoir of a Hidden Childhood During World War Two (Penguin Books, 2003) ISBN 9-780-14230-2415, 0-142-30241-4
- Nelly Toll, When Memory Speaks: The Holocaust in Art (1998) ISBN 9-780-27595-5342, 0-275-95534-6
- Nelly Toll, Without Surrender: Art of the Holocaust (1978 University of Virginia) ISBN 9-780-89471-0551, 0-894-71055-9
