= Margarita Martínez López =

Mexican politician

- Born: 11 June 1950 (age 75); Tampico, Tamaulipas, Mexico
- Occupation: Politician
- Political party: PRI

Margarita Martínez López (Note: In this Mexican name, the surname is Martínez and the second or maternal family name is López.) (born 11 June 1950) is a Mexican politician affiliated with the Institutional Revolutionary Party (PRI).

Martínez López is a native of Tampico, Tamaulipas. In the 2003 mid-terms she was elected to the Chamber of Deputies to represent Nuevo León's 10th district during the 59th session of Congress. She later served as municipal president of Escobedo, Nuevo León, in 2006–2009.
