= Orlando García Flores =

Mexican politician (born 1965)

- Born: 14 June 1965 (age 60); Nuevo León, Mexico
- Education: Licenciado en Mercadotecnia, Universidad Tec Milenio
- Occupation: Politician
- Political party: PAN

Orlando Alfonso García Flores (born 14 June 1965) is a Mexican politician from the National Action Party (PAN). In the 2000 general election he was elected to the Chamber of Deputies to represent Nuevo León's 10th district during the 58th session of Congress.
