= Constance Clayton =

American educator and civic leader (1933–2023)

- Born: Constance Elaine Clayton; October 23, 1933; Philadelphia, Pennsylvania, U.S.
- Died: September 18, 2023 (aged 89)
- Resting place: West Laurel Hill Cemetery, Bala Cynwyd, Pennsylvania, U.S.
- Education: Temple University (BA, MA); University of Pennsylvania (PhD)
- Occupation: Educator
- Awards: Rockefeller Foundation fellowship

Constance Elaine Clayton (October 23, 1933 – September 18, 2023) was an American educator and civic leader. She was the first woman and the first African American to serve as Superintendent of the School District of Philadelphia from 1982 to 1993. The University of Pennsylvania Graduate School of Education established the Constance E. Clayton Professorship in 1992. This was the first professorship established in the name of an African American woman at an Ivy League institution and the second such professorship in the United States. (Note: By the end of 1993, ten chairs (including professorships) in the United States had been endowed and named for African Americans: Hannah Diggs Atkins, Constance E. Clayton, Bill and Camille Cosby, W. E. B. Du Bois, Wade H. McCree Jr., Paul Robeson, Roy Wilkins, and three had been named for Martin Luther King Jr. At the time, eight African Americans held those chairs and one African American, John S. Butler, held two at the University of Texas at Austin. The Constance E. Clayton Professorship, established in 1992 at the University of Pennsylvania Graduate School of Education, was the second endowed chair or professorship to be named for an African American woman – the first being the Hannah Diggs Atkins Chair at Oklahoma State University. (See: Stone, Chuck (Winter 1993–1994). "African Americans Holding Endowed University Chairs". The Journal of Blacks in Higher Education (2): 127–130. JSTOR 2962585. Accessed September 19, 2017.) Nonetheless, the Clayton Professorship was the first in the name of an African American woman at an Ivy League institution.)

== Early life and education ==
Clayton was born in North Philadelphia to Willabell (née Harris) and Levi Clayton in 1933. Her parents separated shortly before she reached the age of two and were subsequently divorced. She was raised by her mother and maternal grandmother, Sarah Harris. Of her childhood, she said: "I had everything I needed and most of the things I wanted. I really was very fortunate." Her mother took her to art museums, establishing a lifelong love for art. Clayton attended Paul Laurence Dunbar Elementary School and the Philadelphia High School for Girls. She credited lawyer Sadie Tanner Mossell Alexander, the wife of civil rights attorney Raymond Pace Alexander, as one of her mentors.

Clayton received her B.A. and M.A. at Temple University in 1955, where she specialized in elementary school administration. She earned her Ph.D. from the University of Pennsylvania in 1974, and a Doctor of Education degree (EdD) in educational administration from the University of Pennsylvania Graduate School of Education in 1981.

Clayton was the national social action chairman of the Delta Sigma Theta sorority.

== Career ==
=== Schoolteacher ===
From 1955 to 1964, Clayton was a teacher with the School District of Philadelphia, teaching in the fourth grade at the William H. Harrison School in North Philadelphia.

From 1964 to 1969 she designed social studies curricula for elementary grades. From 1969 to 1971, she was the head of a new African and Afro-American Studies program, addressing issues faced by students of all ages. From 1971 to 1972, she was director of the Women's Bureau for the Middle Atlantic States, working for the United States Department of Labor in Washington, D.C. to support pay equity and women's employment status.

From 1973 to 1983, she was first the director and later the associate superintendent of the Early Childhood Program for the Philadelphia school system. Under her direction, the program was seen as a national model.

=== Superintendent of schools ===
In 1983, Clayton defeated 83 other candidates to become the superintendent of the School District of Philadelphia. She was Philadelphia's first African American woman superintendent. She served in the position from 1983 to 1993. She also became president-elect of the national Council of Great City Schools. The Philadelphia school system was the sixth largest school system in the United States, employing approximately 24,500 teachers, administrators, and support staff at over 250 locations. Challenges included the extreme poverty of much of the student body and a budget deficit.

Clayton set a number of goals for the city's schools, including balancing the budget, standardizing the curriculum, and attracting private sector support. At the end of her first eight years as superintendent, the school system had been largely successful in meeting those goals.

Clayton was a moral voice in support of children in the education system, emphasizing that "Somebody had better step forward and be the advocate for kids." She emphasized the need for federal, state, and city governments to all make a "concrete investment" in education. She recognized the difficulties faced by many children, and promoted programs to address their needs, including the Homeless Student Initiative, America 2000, a broader sexual education program, and acceptance of pregnant students who wish to graduate. "We must educate the kids born into poverty and despair. We must value all kids and not just a select few." "We have enormously talented kids who have a great deal of potential, children who are aspiring." According to Philadelphia Inquirer reporter Claude Lewis, Clayton "made meaningful improvement and provided a measure of hope for students and teachers alike who live with despair." She retired in 1993.

Clayton was known for her "forceful persona" and "no-nonsense" approach and for her advocacy for children.

=== Philadelphia Museum of Art ===
In retirement, Clayton continued to be active in the community and to serve on the boards of a number of institutions. These include the Philadelphia Museum of Art, where she served on the board of trustees. In 2000 she founded the museum's African American Collections Committee. Her work with the museum led to the creation of the exhibits Treasures of Ancient Nigeria (1982) and Represent: 200 Years of African American Art (2014).

== Awards and honors ==
- 17 honorary doctorates
- Rockefeller Foundation fellowship, c. 1974
- Gimbel Award
- Rev. Jesse F. Anderson Memorial Award from Widener University
- Distinguished Daughters of Pennsylvania Award
- Humanitarian Service Award from the Philadelphia Commission on Human Relations
- Star Community Commitment to Education Award, 2008, from the Philadelphia Education Fund
- The General Assembly of Pennsylvania. "House Resolution No. 475: A Resolution Honoring the educational and professional achievements of Dr. Constance E. Clayton, the first African American and the first woman superintendent of the School District of Philadelphia". Pennsylvania General Assembly.

== Death and legacy ==
Clayton died on September 18, 2023, and was interred at West Laurel Hill Cemetery in Bala Cynwyd, Pennsylvania.

The Constance E. Clayton Professorship in Urban Education was established in 1992 at the University of Pennsylvania Graduate School of Education. It received support from the William Penn Foundation, Cigna, The Vanguard Group, and PNC Bank. Constance Clayton was the first African American woman to have a professorship named for her at an Ivy League institution. U. Penn also established The Clayton Lecture Series on Urban Education in her honor.

Educational offices
Preceded by Michael P. Marcase	School District of Philadelphia Superintendent; 1982–1993	Succeeded by David Hornbeck
