= Vezzoli =

Vezzoli is an Italian surname. Notable people with the surname include:

- Francesco Vezzoli (born 1971), Italian artist and filmmaker
- Roberto Vezzoli (fl. 2010), Italian sport shooter

== See also ==
- Vezzosi
