= Vivian Gadsden =

American psychologist

Vivian Lynette Gadsden
- Education: Fisk University; University of Michigan
- Scientific career
- Workplaces: Wayne State University; University of Pennsylvania
- Thesis: ADULT LITERACY LEARNING AND INSTRUCTION. (1989)

Vivian Lynette Gadsden is an American psychologist who is an education researcher at the University of Pennsylvania. Her research considers the social and cultural factors that affect learning and literacy. She is interested in intergenerational learning within African-American families.

== Early life and education ==
Gadsden was an undergraduate student at Fisk University in Nashville, Tennessee. She moved to the University of Michigan for graduate studies, where she completed a doctorate of education in adult literacy. Gadsden worked as a Spencer Foundation postdoctoral fellow.

== Research and career ==
Gadsden started her academic career studying educational psychology at Wayne State University. She moved to Washington, D.C. where she was made a research analyst in policy studies. She was appointed to the University of Pennsylvania Graduate School of Education (GSE) Literacy Research centre in 1988 and was made associate director in 1989.

Gadsden was made Director of the National Center on Fathers and Families in 1994. In 2006 she was made the William T. Carter Professor in Child Development and Education.

Gadsden's research considers the cultural and social factors that impact learning and literacy. In particular, she has focused on urban education and family literacy, and how this intersects with culture, race and gender. She is interested in how parents engage with their children's early literacy. Gadsden engages with Philadelphia's most vulnerable communities through the Penn Futures Project. During the COVID-19 pandemic, Gadsden studied the disproportionate impact of COVID-19 on the educational outcomes of students of color.

Gadsden seeks to improve the academic performance of students from underrepresented groups. She serves on the advisory boards of various school readiness initiatives and family literacy programs, and has provided expert advice to the United States Congress on children's reading. She served as the President of the American Educational Research Association in 2016. In 2021, she was made Chair-Elect of the University of Pennsylvania Office of the Faculty Senate.

== Awards and honors ==
- 2017 Elected to the National Academy of Education
- 2020 Edu-Scholar's top education scholars
- 2020 Inducted to the Reading Hall of Fame

== Selected publications ==
- Gadsden, Vivian L. (2008). "The Arts and Education: Knowledge Generation, Pedagogy, and the Discourse of Learning". Review of Research in Education. 32 (1): 29–61. doi:10.3102/0091732x07309691. ISSN 0091-732X. S2CID 146557057.
- Waterman, Clare; McDermott, Paul A.; Fantuzzo, John W.; Gadsden, Vivian L. (2012). "The matter of assessor variance in early childhood education—Or whose score is it anyway?". Early Childhood Research Quarterly. 27 (1): 46–54. doi:10.1016/j.ecresq.2011.06.003. ISSN 0885-2006.
- John W. Fantuzzo; Vivian L. Gadsden; Paul A. McDermott (2011). "An Integrated Curriculum to Improve Mathematics, Language, and Literacy for Head Start Children". American Educational Research Journal. 48 (3): 763–793. doi:10.3102/0002831210385446. Wikidata Q99724814.
