= Reyes Tamez =

Mexican politician

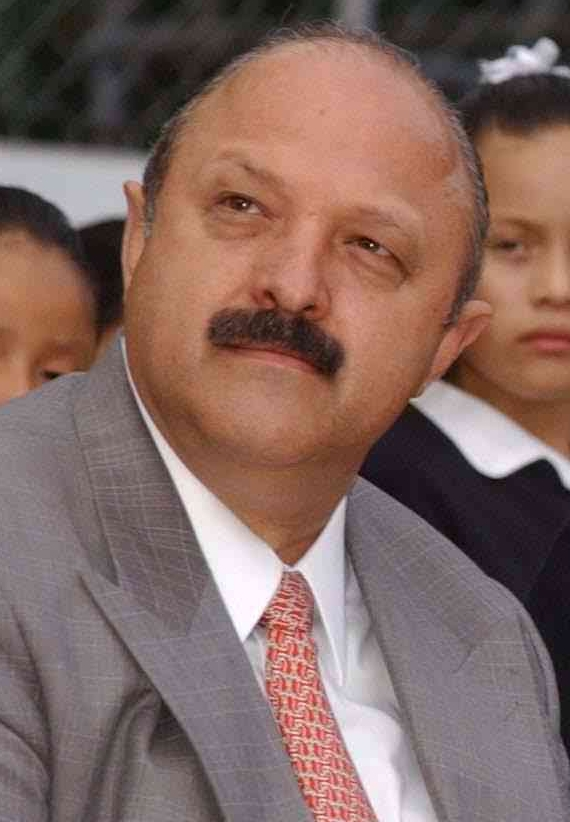
Tamez in August 2003

Reyes Silvestre Tamez Guerra (Note: In this name that follows Hispanic American naming customs, the first or paternal surname is Tamez and the second or maternal family name is Guerra.) (born 18 April 1952) is a Mexican immunochemist and politician. He has served as secretary of education of the state of Nuevo León, as president of the Autonomous University of Nuevo León (UANL) and as secretary of education in the cabinet of President Vicente Fox (2000–2006).

== Biography ==
Born in Monterrey, Nuevo León, on 18 April 1952, Reyes Tamez Guerra graduated from the Autonomous University of Nuevo León in 1975 with a bachelor's degree in chemistry, biology and parasitology and received both a master's degree and a doctorate in immunology at the National Polytechnic Institute (IPN). Later on he did a postdoctoral stay at the Institute of Cancerology and Imnunogenetics at Villejuif, France.

From 1996 to 2000, Tamez served as rector of the Autonomous University of Nuevo León (UANL) and then, from 2000 to 2006, he served as federal secretary of education in the cabinet of Vicente Fox. In January 2007, Governor of Nuevo León Natividad González Parás designated him as the Nuevo León secretary of education, replacing former incumbent Yolanda Blanco.

In the 2009 mid-term election, he was elected for the New Alliance to a plurinominal seat in the Chamber of Deputies, where he served during the 61st Congress.

Tamez has co-authored two books in his area of expertise, has presented over 120 papers at national and international conferences and has published over 30 articles in several national and international journals. He has received the Jorge Rosenkranz National Prize in Medical Research and is a member of the Mexican Academy of Sciences.

== Notes ==
Preceded by Miguel Limón Rojas	Secretary of Education; 2000–2006	Succeeded by Josefina Vázquez Mota
