= Eloise Gerry =

American forestly scientist (1885–1970)

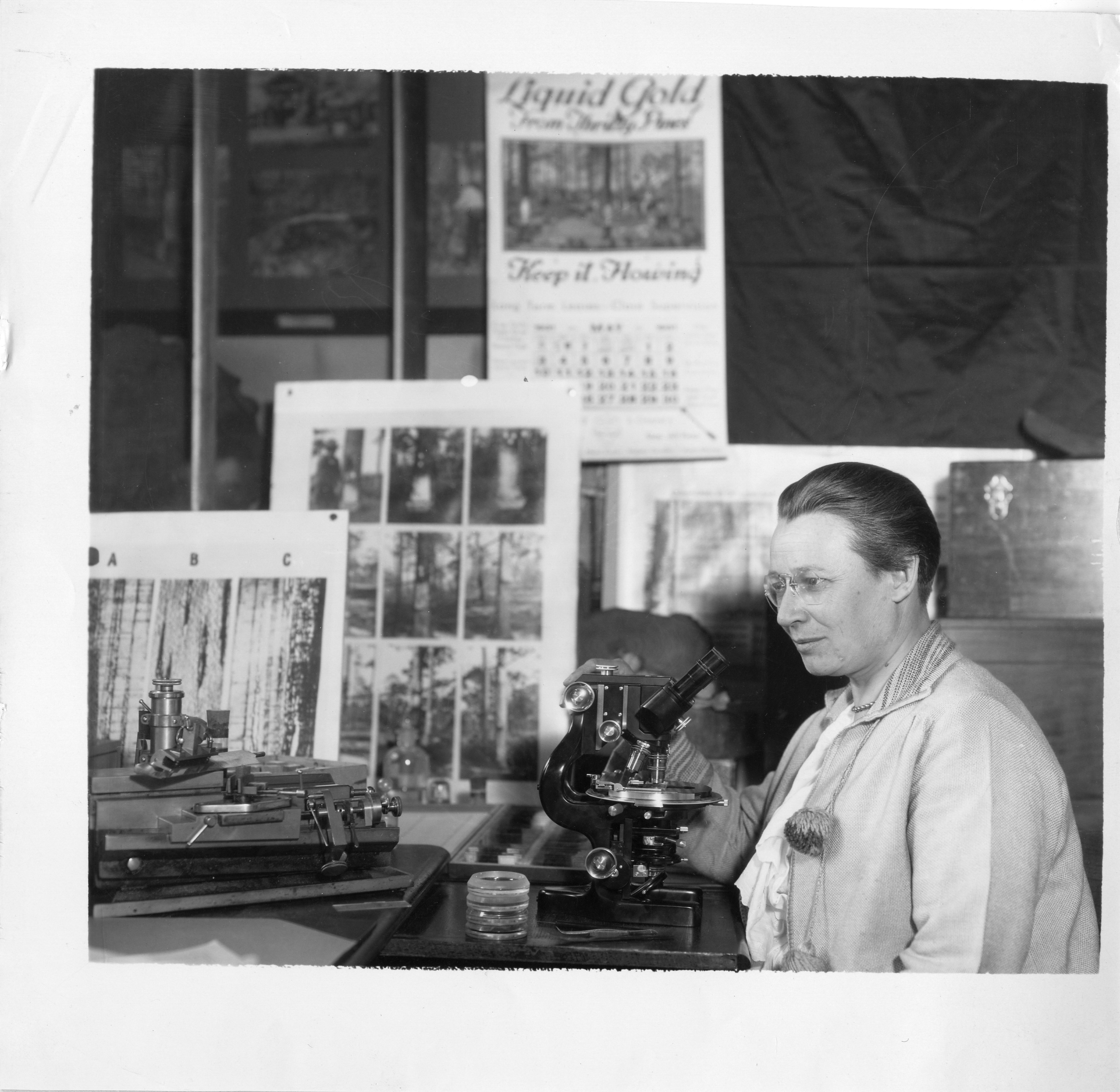
- Born: January 12, 1885; Boston, Massachusetts
- Died: November 9, 1970 (aged 85)
- Education: Radcliffe College, University of Wisconsin-Madison
- Known for: Forest products research
- Scientific career
- Fields: Forestry
- Workplaces: United States Forest Service

Eloise Gerry (January 12, 1885 – 1970) was an influential research scientist whose early 20th century work contributed greatly to the study of southern pine trees and turpentine production. Gerry was the first woman appointed to the professional staff of the U.S. Forest Service at the Forest Products Laboratory, and one of the first women in the United States to specialize in forest products research.

== Biography ==
Eloise Gerry was born January 12, 1885, in Boston, Massachusetts. She received both bachelor's and master's degrees from Harvard University's Radcliffe College, where she specialized in the anatomy of wood and trees and their physiological responses. She was first hired as a research scientist by the U.S. Forest Service in 1910. On April 28, 1914, she addressed the members of the Northern Hemlock and Hardwood Manufacturers Association, at the Forest products laboratory. Her address was titled "The Structure of Wood and Some of its Properties and Uses." While working at the new Forest Products Laboratory (FPL) in Madison, Wisconsin, Gerry would also go on to earn a Ph.D. from the University of Wisconsin in 1921. Her dissertation, based on her research at the FPL, was titled "Oleoresin Production: A Microscopic Study of the Effects Produced on Woody tissues of Southern Pines by Different Methods of Turpentining."

Gerry's research in the area of southern pines and turpentining proved to be her most influential efforts. Working in Mississippi, Gerry performed pioneering work in microscopical studies of the anatomy of resin-yielding pines, and successfully developed methods to increase yield as well as prolong the working life of trees. She worked toward developing best methods stating, "The microscope reveals many secrets concerning the activities of the tree in producing turpentine and gives these results more quickly than experimental methods alone." Based on her field-based research, Gerry was able to develop a program of "More turpentine, less scar, better pine" that many later attributed as a savior for the struggling industry.

During World War II, Gerry wrote FPL wartime publications on defects in wood used for trainer aircraft and gliders. After the war she worked in the area of research on foreign woods. Following 44 years with the U.S. Forest Service, Gerry retired in 1954. Gerry died in 1970 at the age of 85.

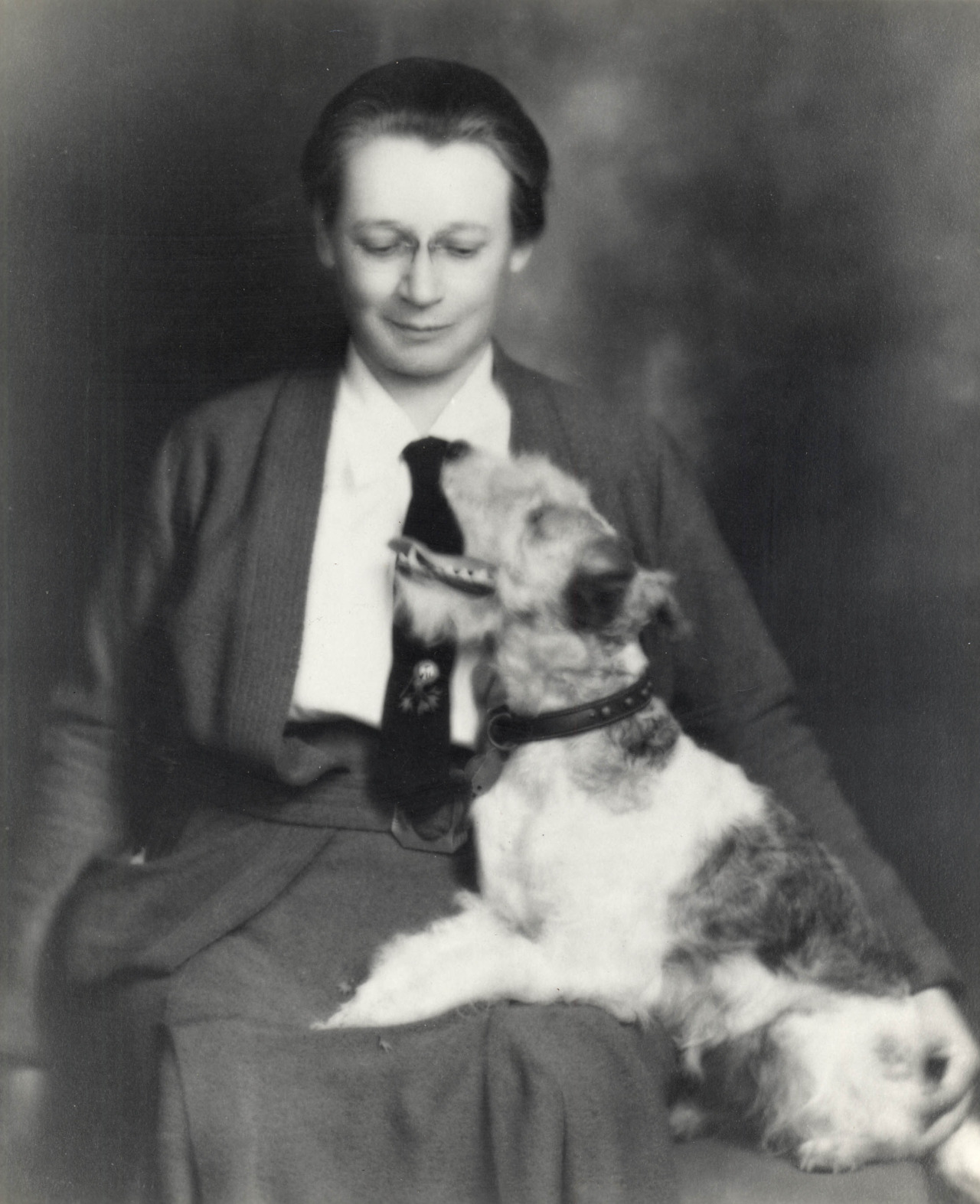
Eloise B. Gerry with her dog

Gerry's work at the Forest Products Laboratory extended beyond turpentine research. When she joined the laboratory in 1910, she was initially responsible for preparing microscope slides and photomicrographs for the study of wood anatomy and for building a collection of wood specimens. Her specialized training in preparing and examining wood specimens enabled her to establish a foundation for microscopic wood research at the newly opened laboratory. She subsequently applied this expertise to questions involving wood structure, properties, preservation, and utilization, and became recognized as an authority on wood technology. By the 1920s, the Smithsonian Institution described her as one of the few women in the United States specializing in research on lumbering, wood utilization, and turpentining.

Gerry also worked to make scientific knowledge about wood useful to industry and government. Over the course of her career she published more than 120 articles in technical and trade journals and investigated a wide range of materials and applications, including foreign woods and substitutes for materials needed by industry. During the two World Wars, her research was applied to problems associated with military production, while later work expanded her expertise beyond American forest species. She also became involved in higher education at the University of Wisconsin, where she served as an assistant professor. Her career at the Forest Products Laboratory therefore encompassed both fundamental research into wood anatomy and practical investigations intended to improve the use and conservation of forest resources.
