= Eloise Kruger =

American miniature collector

Eloise Andrews Kruger
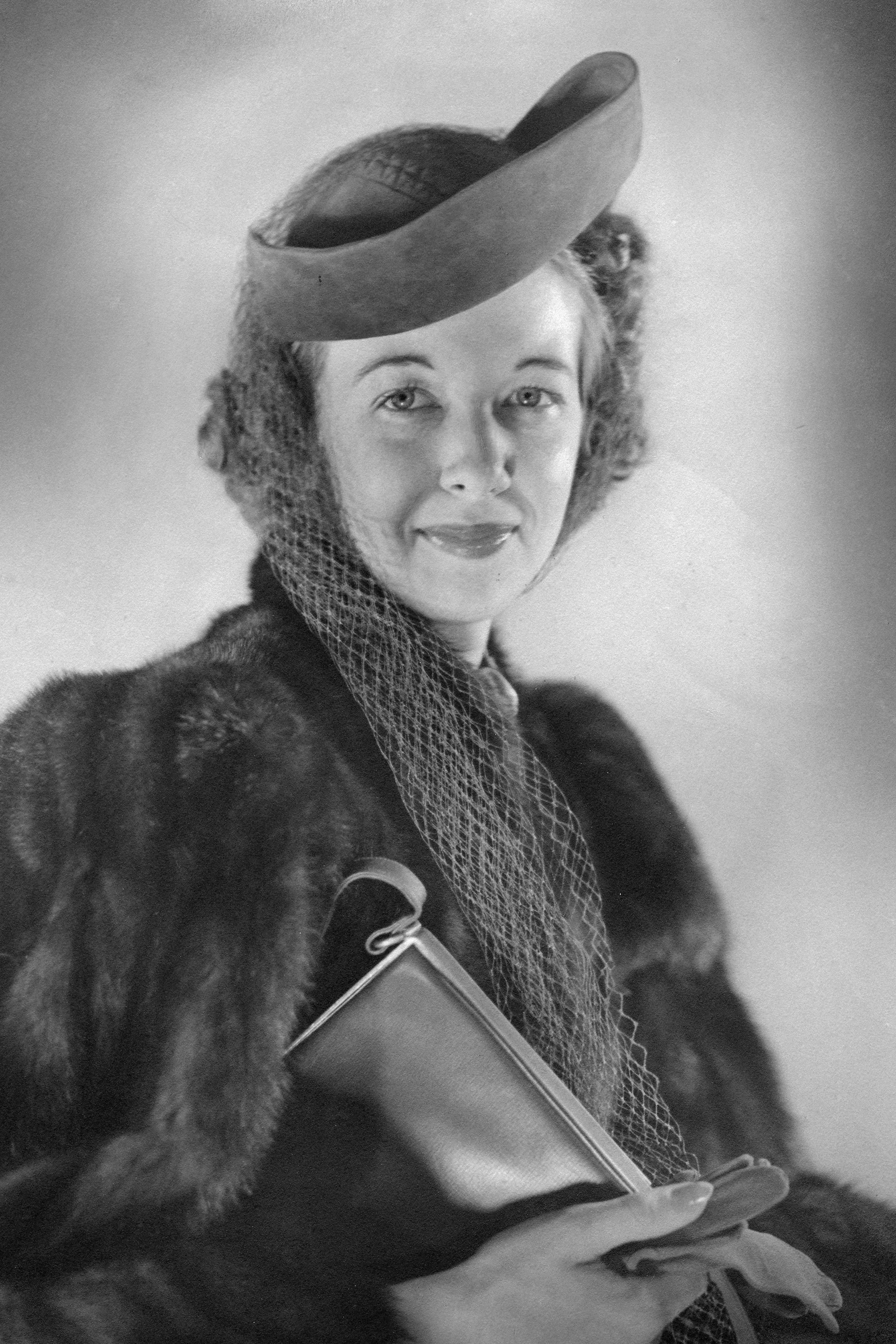
- Born: June 26, 1914; Lincoln, Nebraska
- Died: November 19, 1995 (aged 81); Lincoln, Nebraska
- Occupation: Miniature collector

Eloise Andrews Kruger (June 26, 1914 – November 19, 1995) was an American miniature collector from Lincoln, Nebraska, who was known for her collection of historically-accurate American miniatures.

== Early life ==
Kruger was born in Lincoln, Nebraska, on June 26, 1914, as the eldest of Vernon and Luella Dierks Andrews's four daughters. Her cousin, Carl Rohman, acclaimed supporter of the Sheldon Memorial Art Gallery, remembers her being a very confident young woman. Prior to the Depression, she was exposed to a high level of living. She was a passionate reader, especially on the subjects of interior design and miniature collecting.
She graduated from Lincoln High in 1932 and enrolled at the University of Nebraska. She only attended until 1934 because she wanted to help support her mother and sisters after her father abandoned the family for another woman. She lived with her aunt and uncle to help her three sisters pay for college, all of whom graduated.
She married Carl Kruger in 1939, and soon after became interested in miniature figures.

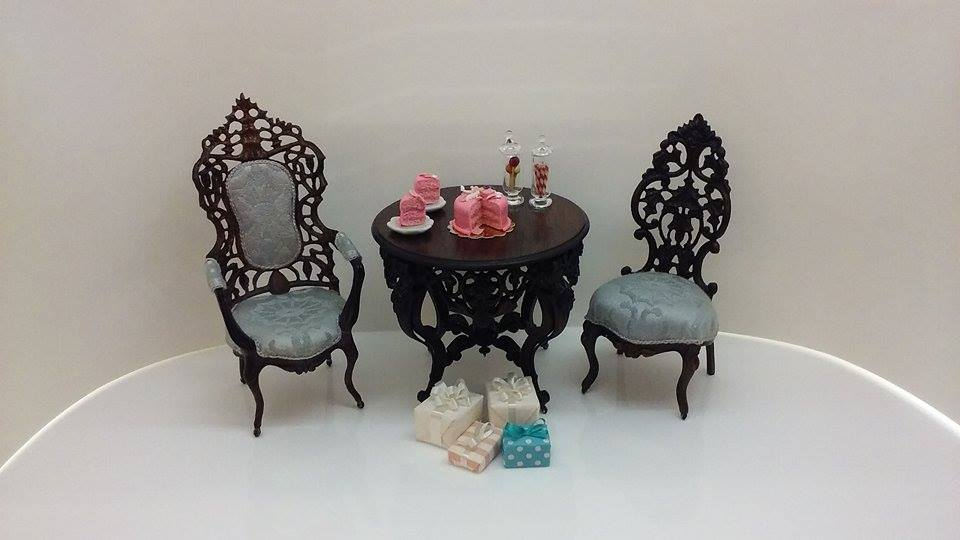
Miniature Furniture

== Career ==
She worked as a secretary, then was quickly promoted to executive secretary. Lee Syndicate hired her as an accountant, despite her lack of knowledge in the area. After buying books and studying she became adept at the trade.
During World War II, when most men were drafted, she was given war-time orders to hire and train women. Eventually she ran an all-woman accounting office until the war ended.
Even once her collection started, she still worked these jobs and helped her husband manage Paramount Laundry.
She was interested in sketching plans; she drew the house her mother built at 1935 Dakota Street.
Her accounting job allowed her to travel a lot. Her cousin, Carl (Ky), claimed that she would find many pieces for her collection on these trips.

== The collection and collecting methods ==
"When she undertook something she did it right. She studied and studied until she got it right" attested Carl Rohman Jr.
She began collecting in the 1930s. The height of her collecting took place in the 1970s and 1980s. She became a published author in Miniature Magazine, commissioned outstanding miniature makers to create models from the American Neoclassical era, and reached out to collectors all over the country.
After assessing the number of American Neoclassical, American colonial and Victorian pieces that she commissioned, it can be assumed those were her favorite eras. Her attention to detail was remarkable, as well as her records, documentation, and effort to learn as much about the eras as possible.

All of the models were created at 1:12 scale. The pieces ranged from furniture, decorative arts, and accessories, from nearly every English and American design style, from Renaissance to Early Modern, all of which she commissioned to look as accurate to the real pieces as possible.

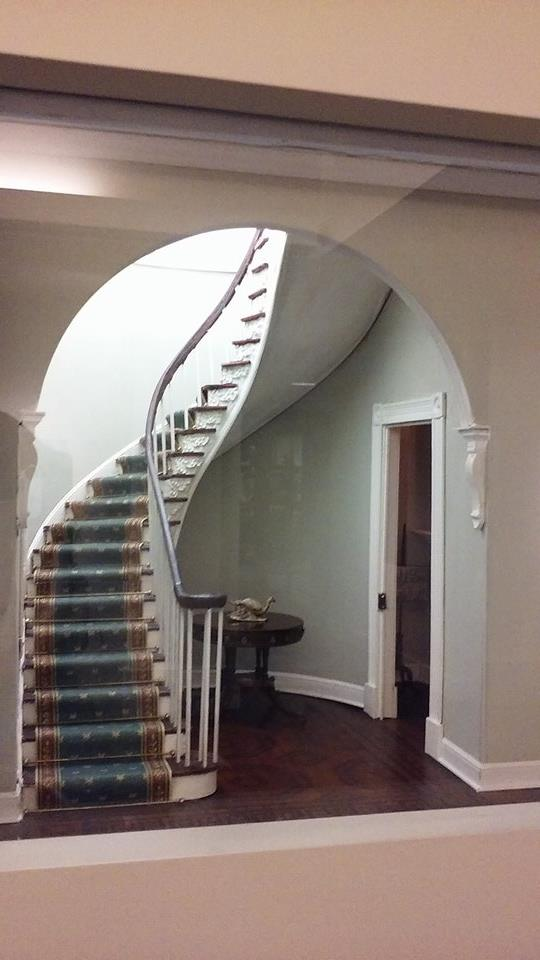
Model in Kruger Gallery

In 1968 alone, she wrote eighty-five different letters to collectors and artists across the country. The relationships represented varied in scope and familiarity. The key trends of these letters include writing multiple letters in one day (44% were written on Thursdays), and the increase of letters per month increasing to 34% in February. The patterns correlate with events that transpired in 1968, like the Chicago riots, her battle with undiagnosed dizzy spells, and a sprained arm that prevented her from writing.

In many of her letters she mentioned that she had an interest in creating 1:12 miniature rugs, many of which she gave away, despite the hours of work one required.
She worked on the Chippendale Back Stool that model maker, Eric Pearson, made custom for her. The flamestitch upholstery took 40 stitches per inch. In February, Eloise told Eunice Tuttle "the upholstery in this case is driving me to despair." Her two main correspondents were Thomas Devereux and Ellen Krucker, and these letters included more personal information, like politics and new cars, much more than simply invoices for her collection. Krucker was one of the two artists (aside from Pearson) that Eloise's husband thought made "worthwhile miniatures". Eloise rented the apartment across the hall from her home, just for storing her miniatures.
Top artists are Eric Pearson with 236 pieces, Eugene Kupjack, Bob Carlisle, Warren Dick, Mell Prescott, and Betty Valentine.

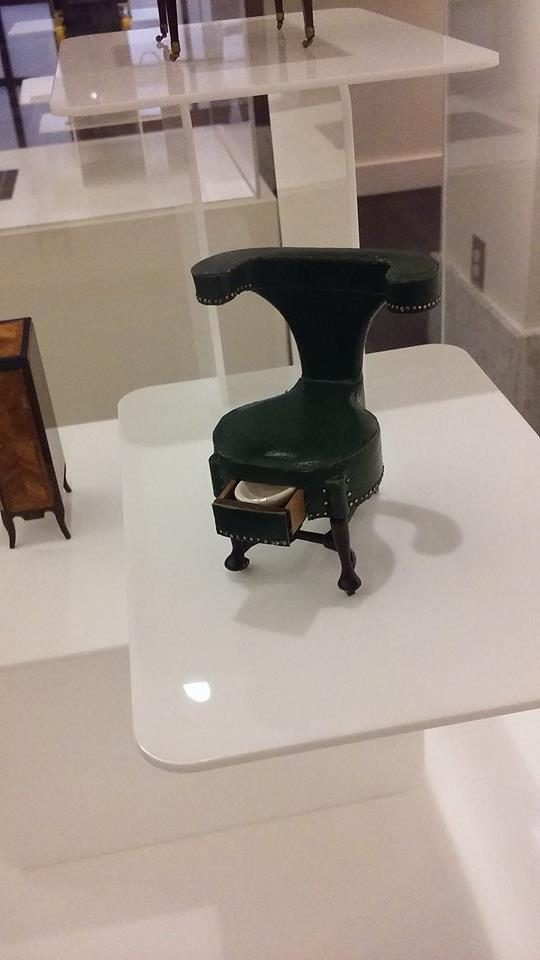
E. Pearson, 1964

== Death and legacy ==
Kruger died on November 19, 1995, at age 81. She was survived by her sister Jean, nephews Donald Campbell and Bob Campbell, and cousin Carl Rohman. Her collection was donated to the University of Nebraska–Lincoln in 1997 and is now held in the Kruger Gallery inside the College of Architecture. This contribution included over eight hundred books on the subjects of architectural detailing, to histories in ceramics, iron work, interior design, and kitchen space planning, as well as her miniature collection of over 20,000 pieces, valued at $500,000. The Kruger Gallery now uses her collection to increase awareness of architectural and interior eras, and in the field of material culture. "I think it's great [to be at UNL]. She valued education, she would be terribly pleased" said her nephew Bob.

Kruger's collection is now a part of the School of Global Integrated Studies at UNL and is being displayed in a new gallery space "The Eloise Kruger Gallery of Miniatures", room 834 in the Oldfather building.
