= Eloise Roorbach =

American writer

Eloise Roorbach (April 17, 1868 – February 16, 1961) was an American artist, writer, editor, and critic.

== Early life and education ==
Eloise Jenkins was born in Lincoln, Illinois, daughter of John Jenkins (who was a judge) and Minnie Spencer Eads Jenkins. She taught drawing locally as a young woman, then studied art in New York City, where she met and married one of the instructors, landscape painter George S. Roorbach, in 1889. They moved to San Francisco together and built a redwood bungalow at Brookdale, in the Santa Cruz Mountains.

== Career ==
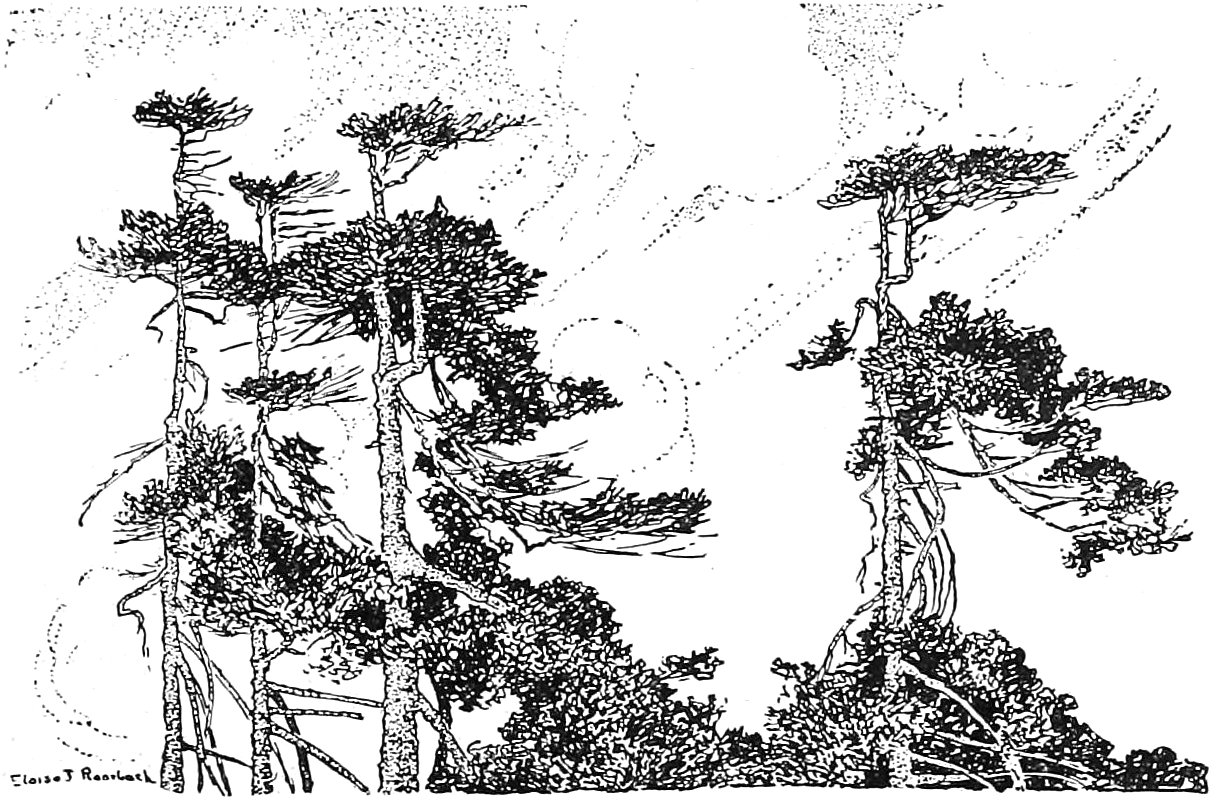
Outing magazine illustration (1911) by Eloise Roorbach

Eloise Roorbach published travel essays about California, usually writing about a trip through the wilderness or along the coast, sometimes with her own illustrations. "The most desirable place in the world is, generally, that enchanted spot just a little beyond the foot of ground we happen to be in," she declared of her pleasure in exploring her adopted state.

Roorbach left her husband in 1910 and relocated back to New York City, where she worked as an editor at Craftsman Magazine, writing mainly (but not exclusively) about garden topics. She earned a reputation as a critic of California architecture, with articles about architect Irving Gill, and the California Mission style.

== Personal life ==
Both Eloise and George Roorbach were involved with Swami Vivekananda and Vedanta Society in the Bay Area, and for a short time Eloise was leader of the Alameda House of Truth. The Roorbachs divorced in 1912, and George remarried in 1913. Eloise Roorbach died in 1961, age 92.
