= Eloísa Ibarra =

Uruguayan visual artist (born 1968)

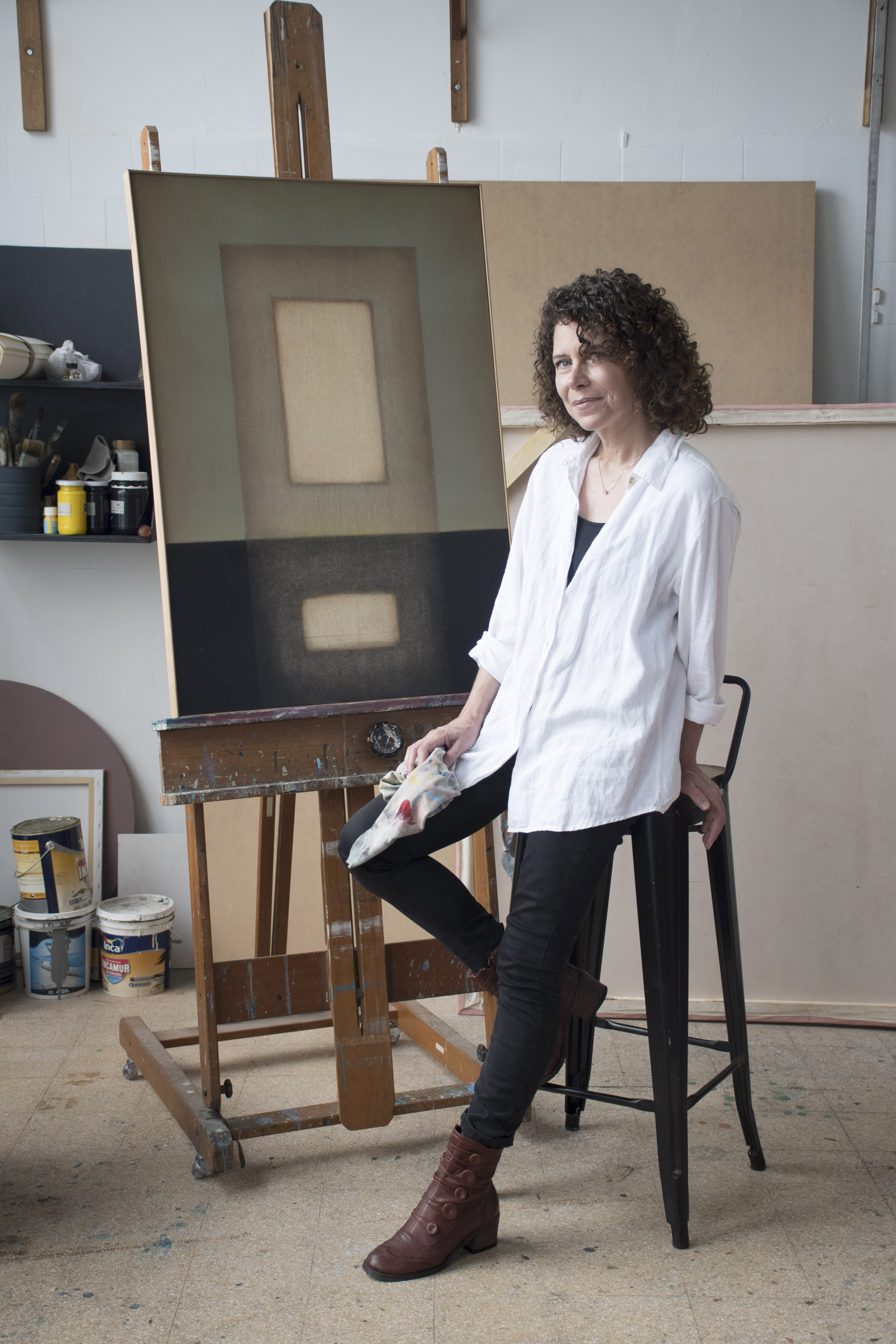
- Born: 31 March 1968 (age 58); Montevideo, Uruguay
- Occupations: Plastic artist, painter
- Website: www.eloisaibarra.com

Eloísa Ibarra (born 1968) is a Uruguayan visual artist who has been recognized for her graphic works.

== Biography ==
Ibarra studied graphic design at the Figari School, and was trained at the National Institute of Fine Arts. She also attended the workshop of master Nelson Ramos and studied graphic techniques with Pedro Peralta.

In 2013 and 2014, her exhibition "The Seed of Babel" toured cities in the United States. It explores changes in language, as illustrated by artistic prints alongside repeated machine translations of Jorge Luis Borges's short story "The Library of Babel".

In 2017, Ibarra's exhibition "Mesura y Abismo" was shown at the Juan Manuel Blanes Museum in Montevideo. That year she was also invited to be an artist-in-residence at the SEA Foundation in Tilburg, The Netherlands.

== Awards ==
- National Honorable Mention, International Salon of Engraving, Integrated (2005)
- Special Mention, Painting Salon del Vino, INAVI, Montevideo, Uruguay (2005)
- 1st Prize Sculpture, Zitarrosa Foundation Award (2006)
- 3rd National Salon of Engraving, Lolita Rubia Foundation, Minas, Uruguay (2006)
- National Visual Arts Award Uruguay (2016)
