= Eloise Smith =

Eloise Smith may refer to:

- Eloise Hughes Smith (1893–1940), survivor of the 1912 RMS Titanic disaster
- Eloise Pickard Smith (1921–1995), American artist and the first director of the California Arts Council
- Eloise Smith (fencer) (born 1978), British fencer
