= Joel Schwartz =

American epidemiologist (born 1947)

- Born: December 12, 1947 (age 78); Long Island, New York, U.S.
- Education: Brandeis University (PhD)
- Occupation: Epidemiologist
- Spouse: Ronnie Levin

Joel Schwartz (born December 12, 1947, in Long Island, New York, United States) is an American epidemiologist, and Professor of Environmental Epidemiology, at Harvard University, School of Public Health.

He graduated from Brandeis University with a Ph.D. in 1980. Schwartz identified the effect on intelligence from the environmental exposure of lead in gasoline, and that lead in gasoline was the major source of lead in people. This led to its ban in 1986 by the EPA. He also demonstrated that lead exposure reduced hearing and growth in children, and increased blood pressure in adults. He also was instrumental in identifying the effects of airborne particles on mortality, heart attacks, cancer, and cognitive function, which have led to sequential tightening in EPA's air quality standards for particles.

He is a partner of the Michigan Metals Epidemiology Research Group.

== Awards ==
- 1991 MacArthur Fellows Program
- 2001 International Union of Environmental Protection Agencies World Congress Award
- 2008 International Society for Environmental Epidemiology John Goldsmith Award
