= University of Texas Health Science Center at San Antonio School of Nursing =

- The University of Texas; Health Science Center at San Antonio; School of Nursing
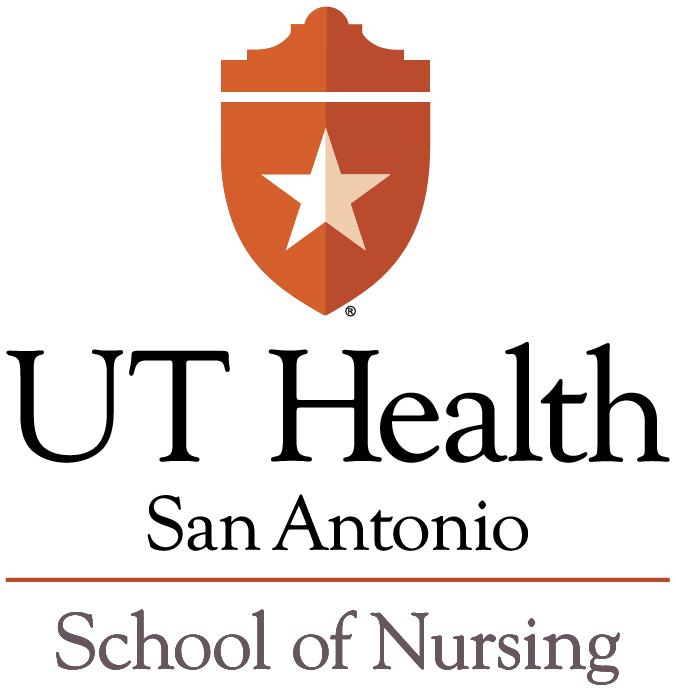

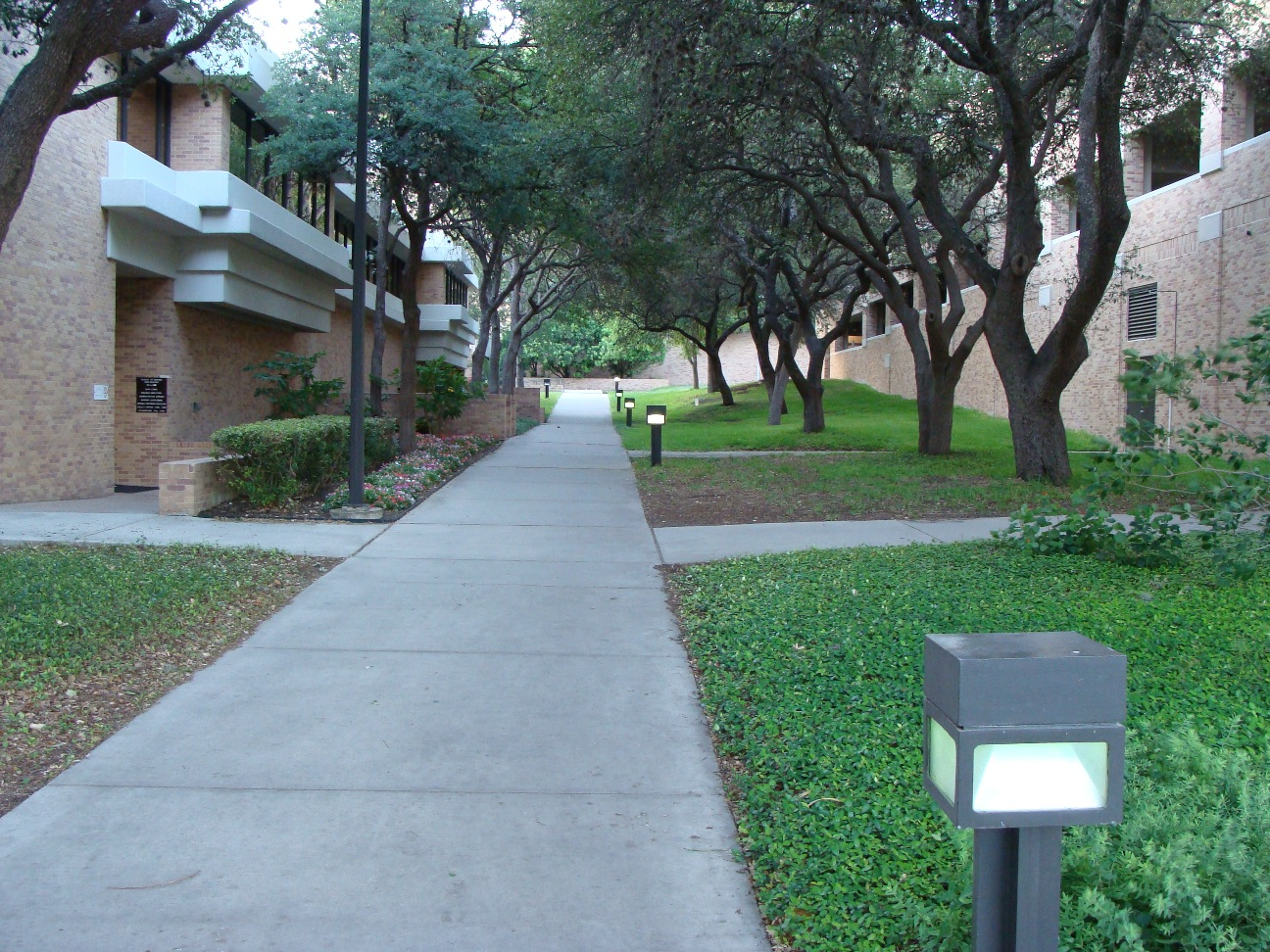
| Established | 1969 |
| School type | Public |
| Dean | Sonya Renae Hardin PhD, MBA/MHA, APRN, FAAN |
| Location | San Antonio, Texas, USA; 29.507476°N 98.575374°W |
| Enrollment | 765 students (2009) |
| Homepage | nursing.uthscsa.edu |

The University of Texas Health Science Center at San Antonio School of Nursing, is a tier one institute of higher education (the only one in South Texas). It is located on the main campus of University of Texas Health Science Center at San Antonio in San Antonio, Texas.

The school was ranked 40th nationally in 2010, and 32nd by NIH funding.

== Education ==
The School has 13 Fellows of the American Academy of Nursing, and has 2 Centers of Excellence:

- The Academic Center for Evidence-Based Practice
- The Center for Community-Based Health Promotion with Women and Children
