= Eloisa Garcia Tamez =

Activist from Texas, U.S>

- Born: March 2, 1935 (age 91); Cameron County, Texas
- Citizenship: American
- Education: St. Mary’s School of Nursing
- Alma mater: BS: Incarnate Word College, MS: University of Texas Health Science Center at San Antonio School of Nursing, Ph.D.: University of Texas at Austin
- Occupations: civil rights activist, nurse, educator

Eloisa Garcia Tamez (born March 2, 1935) is an American civil rights leader, professional nurse, professor, and retired officer of the United States Army's Nursing Corps. She is a prominent opponent and litigant against the Texas–Mexico border wall.

== Early life ==
Born in Cameron County, Texas, to Jose Cavazos Garcia and Lydia Esparza Garcia, Eloisa Garcia Tamez was raised in a community with her sibling, grandparents, cousins, and extended family.

== Education ==
Following schooling in La Encantada and San Benito High School, Tamez attended St. Mary’s School of Nursing in Galveston, Texas. She received a Bachelor of Science degree in nursing from Incarnate Word College in 1968. She received a Master of Science degree in nursing from the University of Texas Health Science Center at San Antonio School of Nursing in 1973 and a Ph.D. in Health Education from the University of Texas at Austin in 1985.

== Early activism ==
In the summer of 1952, she led her community members in a local struggle against the discriminatory effects of the controversial consolidation of Landrum District #3 with the San Benito Independent School District, which would have favored white and elite families over the poorer landowners in traditional rancherias. She achieved high status among the rancherias during this struggle to advance the civil rights of the poorer, Mexican-American families in 'Deep South Texas'. Her community referred to her as "La Chata".

== Military service ==
Tamez worked at the Audie L. Murphy Department of Veterans Affairs Medical Center in San Antonio, Texas from 1972 to 1982. From 1982 to 1999, she was an officer, rising to the rank of lieutenant colonel, in the United States Army Reserve. During this time, she was an assistant chief nurse or chief nurse at VA hospitals in San Juan, Puerto Rico; Hot Springs, South Dakota; and Cleveland, Ohio. On October 25, 2008, she was sworn into the Texas State Guard Medical Brigade as Commander for the Rio Grande Valley Company.

== Teaching ==
Tamez taught at the University of Texas Rio Grande Valley (UTRGV). She became associate dean for Student Success and Engagement at the UTRGV School of Nursing.

== Current activism ==
Tamez co-founded the National Association of Hispanic Nurses and the International Latino Nurse Faculty.

== Awards and honors ==
- 2024: “Leader and Legend of Texas Nursing, Texas Nurses Association
- 2008: Henry B. Gonzalez Civil Rights Award
- 2008: Provost's Hispanic Heritage Award, University of Texas-Pan American
- 2003: Alumna of Distinction, University of the Incarnate Word
- 1994: Fellow of the American Academy of Nursing
- 1994: "A" Proficiency Designator, United States Army Medical Department
