= Eloisa Cabada =

Mexican volleyball player (born 1948)

Personal information
- Born: 1 October 1948 (age 76); Durango, Mexico

Sport
- Sport: Volleyball

Eloisa Cabada (born 1 October 1948) is a Mexican volleyball player. She competed in the women's tournament at the 1968 Summer Olympics.
