= Eloísa Jiménez Gutiérrez =

Mexican painter (1908–90)

- Born: August 30, 1908; León, Guanajuato, Mexico
- Died: 1990 (aged 81–82)

María Eloísa Jiménez Gutiérrez (August 30, 1908 – 1990) was a Mexican painter.

Born in León, Guanajuato, Mexico, Gutiérrez studied with Antonio Segoviano from the time she was thirteen, She painted largely portraits until 1940, in which year she began creating portrait miniatures; after 1950 she returned to larger format work. Her paintings have drawn comparison to those of Eugène Isabey, and she has been called "La Miniaturista de América". Although she exhibited widely, health issues prevented her from traveling, and she remained in her native city until her death.
