= Eloise Head =

English social media personality

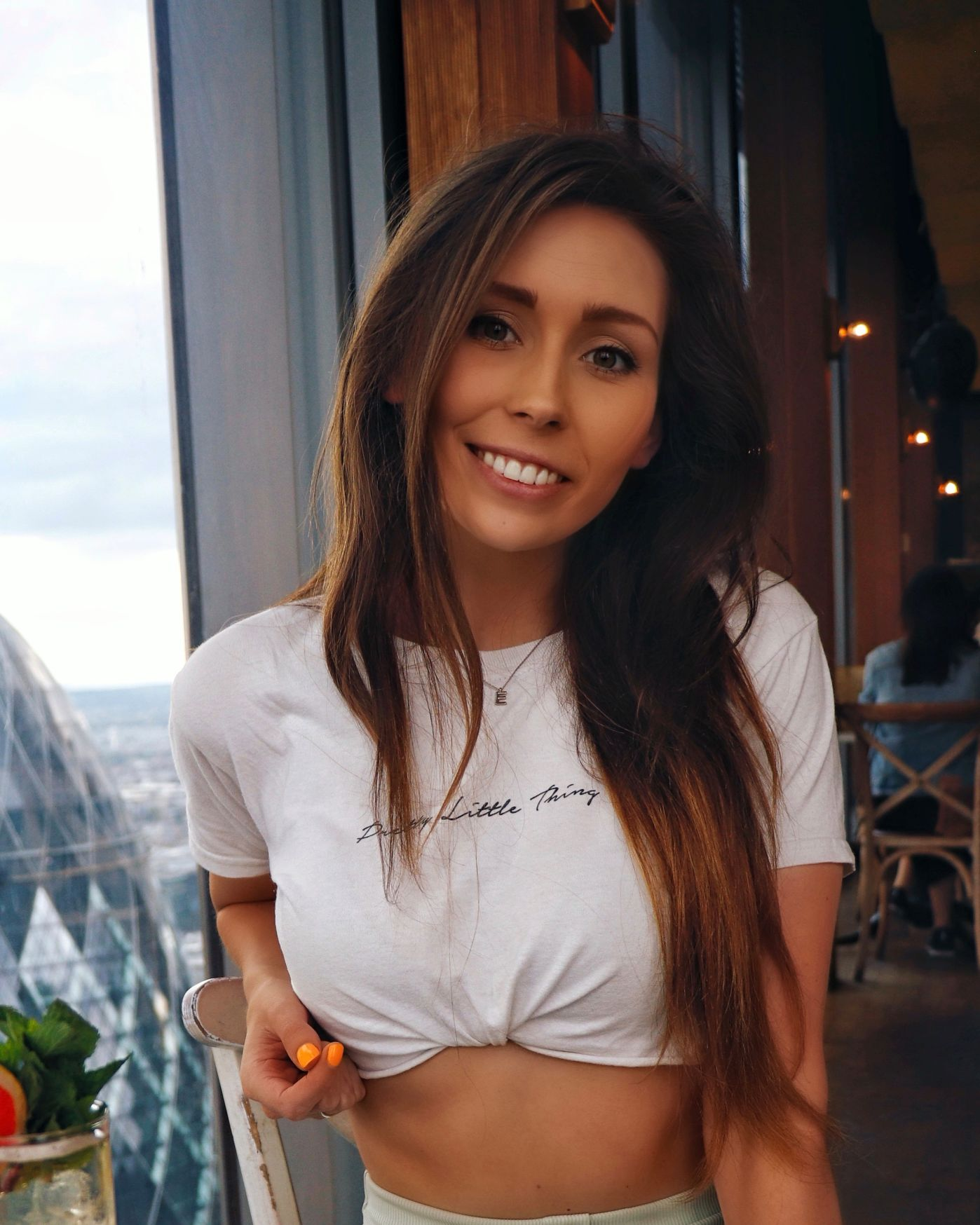
- Head in January 2020
- Born: 23 March 1994 (age 32)
- Occupation: Social media personality Businesswoman
- Years active: 2015–present
- Known for: Recipes on social media

Eloise Head (born 23 March 1994) is an English social media personality and Sunday Times best selling cookbook author.

== Biography ==
Eloise Head is a self-taught baker, and a qualified Personal Trainer. She is the creator of Fitwaffle.

== Career ==
In March 2020, Head launched an Instagram page called Fitwafflekitchen, the page was created as an Isolation Baking Project as the United Kingdom had gone in to lockdown. Her brand gained national popularity during the COVID-19 pandemic due to the simple recipes.

== Filmography ==
=== Television ===
Year	Title	Office	Network	Notes	Ref.
2023	Rachael Ray (talk show)	Herself – Fitwaffle's Office	CBS	season 17 episode 119	
2023	Big Zuu's Big Eats	Herself – Fitwaffle's Office	Dave	series 4 episode 34	

== Bibliography ==
In October 2021, The Bookseller announced Ebury Publishing a division of Penguin Random House had won a seven-way auction to publish her first cookbook, which was later published.

- Fitwaffle's Baking It Easy (2022), ISBN 978-1529148688
- Fitwaffle's Baked in One (2023), ISBN 978-1529901924
- Fitwaffle's No-Bake Baking (2024), ISBN 978-1529921663
- Fitwaffle's Easy Air Fryer (2025), ISBN 978-1529947311
