= Mayela Quiroga Tamez =

Mexican politician

- Born: 2 July 1976 (age 49); Monterrey, Nuevo León, Mexico
- Occupation: Politician
- Political party: PRI

Mayela María de Lourdes Quiroga Tamez (born 2 July 1976) is a Mexican politician affiliated with the Institutional Revolutionary Party (PRI). In the 2003 mid-terms she was elected to the Chamber of Deputies to represent Nuevo León's 6th district during the 59th session of Congress.
