= Eloisa Biasotto Mano =

Brazilian chemist, expert on polymers (1924-2019)

Eloisa Biasotto Mano (October 24, 1924 – June 8, 2019) was a Brazilian chemist and full university professor. She was a specialist in polymers, and enjoyed worldwide recognition for her work. She was a recipient of the National Order of Scientific Merit.

== Early life and education ==
Eloisa Biasotto Mano was born in Rio de Janeiro, October 24, 1924. She received degrees in industrial chemistry (1947), chemical engineering (1955), and a doctorate in organic chemistry (1960). She studied polymer science at the University of Illinois and at the University of Birmingham.

== Career ==
In Brazil, she formed the first group of researchers in the area of polymers, which gave rise to the Institute of Macromolecules of Federal University of Rio de Janeiro (UFRJ), later renamed in her honor. Mano taught organic chemistry at the Institute of Chemistry, UFRJ, where she was a full professor. She supervised many master's and doctoral theses. In her classes, Mano was always keen to demonstrate practically the properties of different materials and their characterizations. She received the National Order of Scientific Merit for her contribution to science. She was a full member of the Brazilian Academy of Sciences since 1978. In 1994, she became Professor Emeritus.

Mano died in Rio de Janeiro, June 8, 2019.

== Awards and honors ==
- 2000, Grand Cross, National Order of Scientific Merit
- 2000, City of Rio de Janeiro Award for Science and Technology
- 2001, Simão Medal, Matias, Brazilian Chemical Society (SBQ)
- 2003, creation of the Profa Prize. Eloisa Bro, Brazilian Polymer Association

== Selected works ==
- Praticas de quimica organica, 1969
- Modified Lignan Polymers from the Resin of Paraná Pine Tree Knots
- Introducao a polimeros, 1999
- Identificação de plásticos, borrachas e fibras, 2000
- Tensile behavior of irradiated recycled polyolefin plastics, 2000
- Química experimental de polímeros, 2004
- Meio ambiente, poluição e reciclagem, 2005
- O impacto do acordo NAS/CNPq na evolução da Química no Brasil: o setor de polímeros, 2007
- Natural Polymer Characterization, 2007
- Polímeros como materiais de engenharia, 2019
