= Eloise Lewis =

Eloise Patricia Rallings Lewis (1920–1999) was the first dean of the School of Nursing at the University of North Carolina at Greensboro

== Education ==
Eloise Patricia Rallings Lewis was born in Pageland, South Carolina, in 1920. She was the fourth daughter of Dr. and Mrs. J. Monroe Rallings, a country medical practitioner and a college speech teacher, respectively. Lewis graduated from Pageland High School in 1936 and continued her education at Winthrop College in Rock Hill, South Carolina. After two years, she transferred to Vanderbilt University in Nashville, Tennessee. She graduated from the hospital program there in 1941.

== Early career ==
Lewis began her medical career as a faculty member of the Women's Medical College School of Nursing in Philadelphia, Pennsylvania. She served as an instructor and supervisor of medical-surgical nursing there from 1941 to 1943. For the next two years, until 1945, she served as an instructor at Johns Hopkins University in Baltimore, Maryland.

== Military service ==
In the spring of 1945, Lewis enlisted in the Army Nurse Corps. She completed basic training at Fort Lee in Virginia and became the assistant director of the Cadet Nurse Corps at the Valley Forge General Hospital in Phoenixville, Pennsylvania. In December 1945, she was discharged with the rank of first lieutenant.

== Later education and career ==
Lewis received a master's degree in education from the University of Pennsylvania in 1951. While there, from 1946 to 1952, she worked as a faculty member. In 1953, Lewis joined the faculty of the School of Nursing at the University of North Carolina at Chapel Hill, remaining a professor there until 1966. While there she received a doctorate in education from Duke University. In 1966, Lewis became the first dean of the School of Nursing at the University of North Carolina at Greensboro. She retired in 1985.

== Service work ==
Lewis was active in the Greensboro community and professional organizations through her career and after retirement. From 1978 to 1980, she served as the president of the American Association of Colleges of Nursing. During the mid-eighties, she worked as the first editor of the Journal of Professional Nursing. Lewis was active with hospice care in the Greensboro area, and received awards for her contributions to the nursing field, including four honorary degrees.

== See also ==
- Nursing
- Army Nurse Corps
- University of North Carolina at Greensboro
