= Robert Zemsky =

- Born: 1941 (age 84–85)
- Education: Whittier College; Yale University
- Occupation: Academic
- Known for: Professor of education at the University of Pennsylvania

Robert M. Zemsky (born 1941) is a Professor of Education, the Chair of the Learning Alliance for Higher Education, and the founding director of the Institute for Research on Higher Education at the University of Pennsylvania Graduate School of Education. He pioneered the use of prospective student market analyses in higher education.

== Education ==
Zemsky earned a B.A. at Whittier College in 1962 and a Ph.D. in History at Yale University in 1966; His dissertation advisor was Edmund S. Morgan. He published a study of Massachusetts colonial politics, and taught in the American studies Department at the University of Pennsylvania.

== Honors ==
He received two honorary degrees: a Doctor of Humane Letters (Honorary) from Towson University (1998) and a Doctor of Humane Letters (Honorary) from Franklin and Marshall College (2008). Zemsky was named one of higher education's top 40 leaders by Change magazine in 1998. He is a former Woodrow Wilson Fellow, and in 2005 he was a member of Secretary of Education Margaret Spellings' Commission on the Future of Higher Education. He has also served as the co-director of the National Center on the Educational Quality of the Workforce, as a senior scholar with the National Center for Postsecondary Improvement, as chair and convener of the Pew Higher Education Roundtable, as senior editor for Policy Perspectives, and as a founding member of the National Advisory Board for the National Survey of Student Engagement (NSSE). Zemsky served on the Board of Trustees of Franklin and Marshall College for 25 years and now serves on the board of Whittier College.

== Research ==
Zemsky's research focuses on assisting institutions of higher education in balancing a commitment to their mission with market success, and he pioneered the use of market analyses in higher education. He is perhaps most famous for his reform efforts that encourage colleges and universities to move to a three-year bachelor's degree program, though he is often cited as a strong voice on college reform, addressing issues such as college cost and quality.

== Consultant ==
Internationally, Zemsky has worked as a consultant and leader on the formation of national goals and education policies for organizations and governments in Japan, Hungary, Zimbabwe, Egypt, Tunisia, India, Singapore, Vietnam, Australia, and Bahrain.

== Publications ==
Zemsky is the author of several books, including The Structure of College Choice (1982), Structure and Coherence, Measuring the Undergraduate Curriculum (1989), Higher Education as Competitive Enterprise: When Markets Matter (2001), Thwarted Innovation: What Happened to e-learning and Why with William Massy (2004), and Remaking the American University: Market Smart and Mission Centered with Gregory Wegner and William Massy (2005). In his most recent book, Making Reform Work: The Case for Transforming American Higher Education (2009), Zemsky presents solutions for the future of higher education, arguing that faculty leadership and strategy are necessary to improve higher education. He suggests efforts should boost student performance in high school, focus on the science of active learning, push Congress to rethink financial aid, and update the rules governing university endowments.
