= Eloisa Reverie Vezzosi =

Italian artist and author

Eloisa Reverie Vezzosi is an Italian artist and author of the art book librosogni (dreamsbook).

== Film ==
- Sono Angelica, voglio vendetta as Maria Romei
