= 5th federal electoral district of Nuevo León =

Federal electoral district of Mexico

Nuevo León's 5th
- Electoral district of the Chamber of Deputies of Mexico

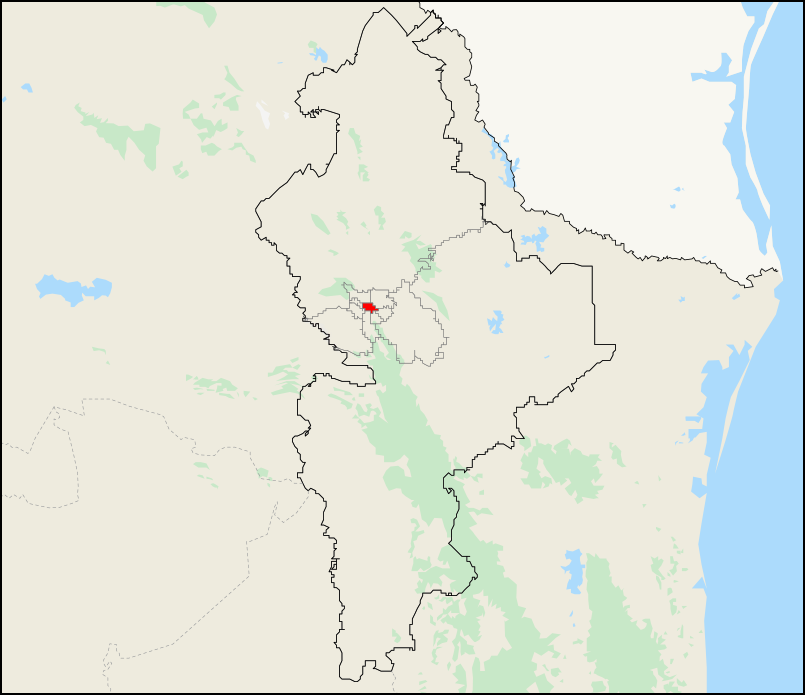

Incumbent
- Member: Santiago González Soto
- Party: ▌Labour Party
- Congress: 66th (2024–2027)

District
- State: Nuevo León
- Head town: Monterrey
- Coordinates: 25°41′N 100°19′W
- Covers: Municipality of Monterrey (part)
- PR region: Second
- Precincts: 151
- Population: 382,898 (2020 census)

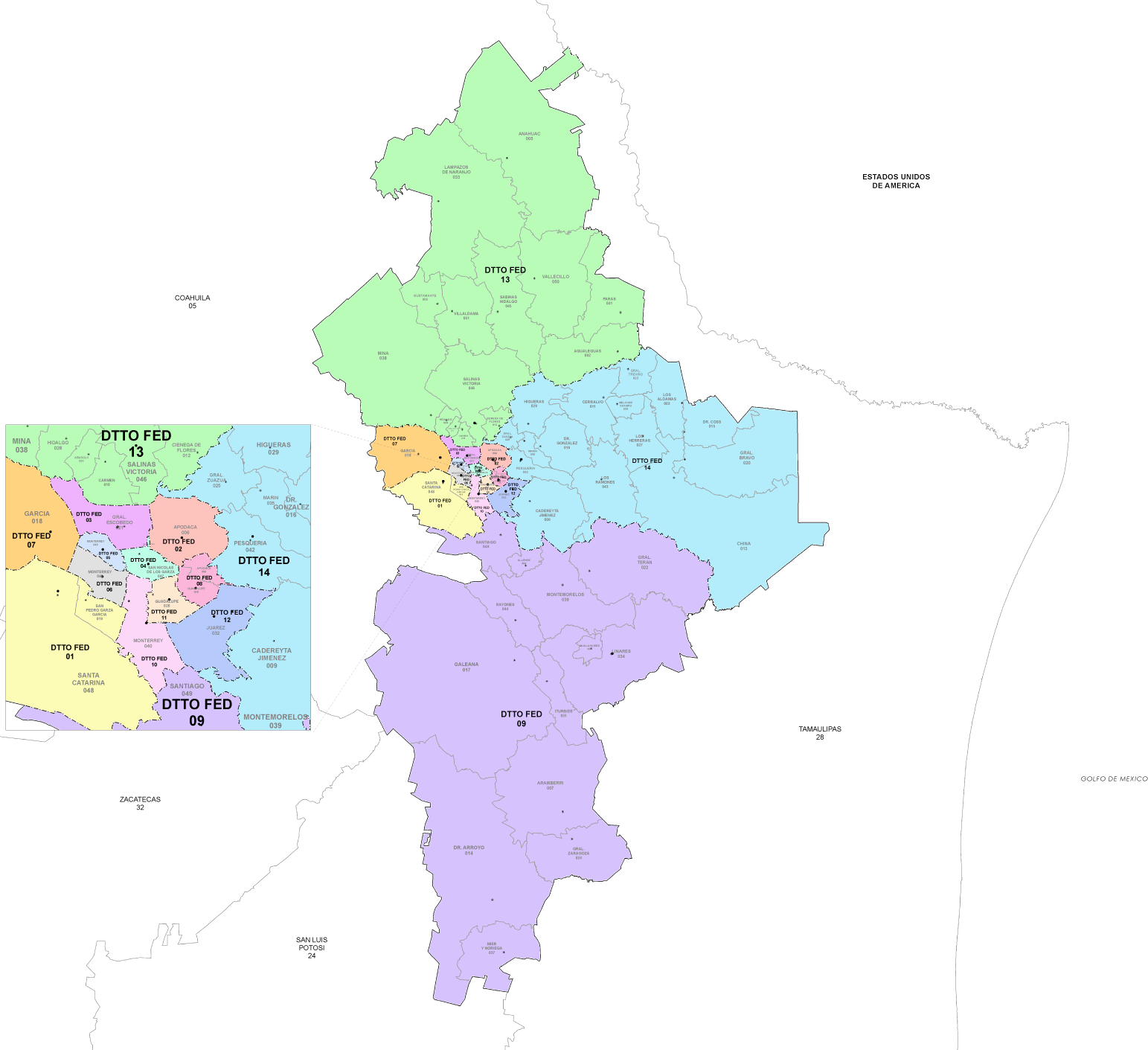
Nuevo León under the 2023 districting plan

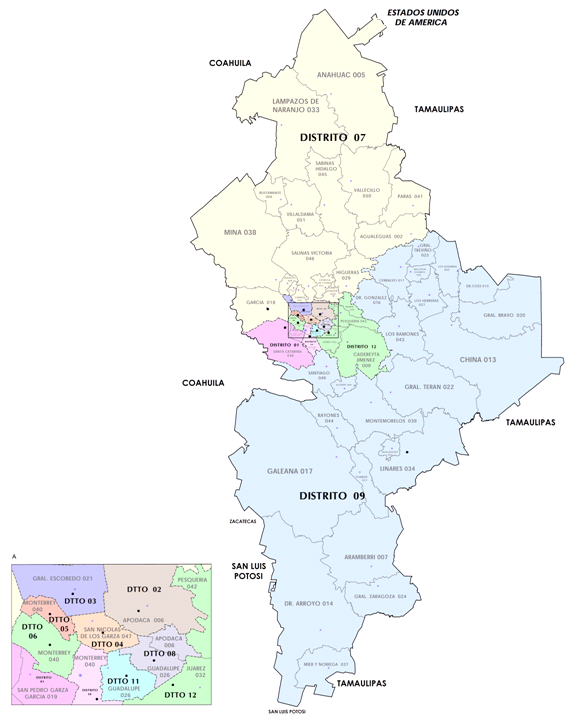
Nuevo León's districts in 2017–2022

The 5th federal electoral district of Nuevo León (Spanish: Distrito electoral federal 05 de Nuevo León) is one of the 300 electoral districts into which Mexico is divided for elections to the federal Chamber of Deputies and one of 14 such districts in the state of Nuevo León.

It elects one deputy to the lower house of Congress for each three-year legislative session by means of the first-past-the-post system. Votes cast in the district also count towards the calculation of proportional representation ("plurinominal") deputies elected from the second region.

The current member for the district, elected in the 2024 general election, is Santiago González Soto of the Labour Party (PT).

== District territory ==
Under the 2023 districting plan adopted by the National Electoral Institute (INE), which is to be used for the 2024, 2027 and 2030 federal elections, Nuevo León's congressional seat allocation rose from 12 to 14. The fifth district is in the centre of the Monterrey metropolitan area and covers 151 electoral precincts (secciones electorales) in the north-west of the municipality of Monterrey. (Note: The remainder of Monterrey is assigned to the 6th and 10th districts.)

The district's head town (cabecera distrital), where results from individual polling stations are gathered together and tallied, is the state capital, the city of Monterrey. The district reported a population of 382,898 in the 2020 census.

== Previous districting schemes ==
Evolution of electoral district numbers
	1974	1978	1996	2005	2017	2023
Nuevo León	7	11	11	12	12	14
Chamber of Deputies	196	300				

2017–2022

Between 2017 and 2022, the district comprised 111 precincts in the north-west of the municipality of Monterrey, with the remainder assigned to the 6th and 10th districts.

2005–2017

Under the 2005 districting plan, the district covered the north-west of Monterrey, with the remainder of the municipality assigned to the 6th, 7th and 10th districts.

1996–2005

From 1996 to 2005, the district covered the north-west of Monterrey, with the remainder of the municipality assigned to the 6th, 7th and 10th districts.

1978–1996

The districting scheme in force from 1978 to 1996 was the result of the 1977 electoral reforms, which increased the number of single-member seats in the Chamber of Deputies from 196 to 300. Under that plan, Nuevo León's seat allocation rose from 7 to 11. The 5th district had its head town at Linares and it comprised the municipalities of Aramberri, Doctor Arroyo, Galeana, General Terán, General Zaragoza, Hualahuises, Iturbide, Linares and Mier y Noriega.

== Deputies returned to Congress ==
(Mexico) National parties
- Current
- PAN
- PRI
- PT
- PVEM
- MC
- Morena
- PAZ
- Somos
- Defunct or local only
- PLM
- PNR
- PRM
- PNM
- PP
- PPS
- PARM
- PFCRN
- CON
- PANAL
- PSD
- PES
- PES
- PRD

Nuevo León's 5th district
Election	Deputy	Party	Term	Legislature
1916	Reynaldo Garza Martínez		1916–1917	Constituent Congress of Querétaro
...
1979	José Fuad González Amille	Institutional Revolutionary Party	1979–1982	51st Congress
1982	Eleazar Bazaldúa Bazaldúa	Institutional Revolutionary Party	1982–1985	52nd Congress
1985	Jesús Siller Rojas	Institutional Revolutionary Party	1985–1988	53rd Congress
1988	Eleazar Bazaldúa Bazaldúa	Institutional Revolutionary Party	1988–1991	54th Congress
1991	Jaime Heliodoro Rodríguez Calderón	Institutional Revolutionary Party	1991–1994	55th Congress
1994	Jesús Siller Rojas	Institutional Revolutionary Party	1994–1997	56th Congress
1997	Juan Manuel Parás González	Institutional Revolutionary Party	1997–2000	57th Congress
2000	Eloy Cantú Segovia	Institutional Revolutionary Party	2000–2003	58th Congress
2003	Marcela Guerra Castillo	Institutional Revolutionary Party	2003–2006	59th Congress
2006	Gustavo Fernando Caballero Camargo	Institutional Revolutionary Party	2006–2009	60th Congress
2009	Marcela Guerra Castillo	Institutional Revolutionary Party	2009–2012	61st Congress
2012	Héctor Humberto Gutiérrez de la Garza	Institutional Revolutionary Party	2012–2015	62nd Congress
2015	Federico Eugenio Vargas Rodríguez	Institutional Revolutionary Party	2015–2018	63rd Congress
2018	Santiago González Soto	Labour Party (Mexico)	2018–2021	64th Congress
2021	Marcela Guerra Castillo	Institutional Revolutionary Party	2021–2024	65th Congress
2024	Santiago González Soto	Labour Party (Mexico)	2024–2027	66th Congress

== Presidential elections ==
Nuevo León's 5th district
Election	District won by	Party or coalition	%
2018	Andrés Manuel López Obrador	Juntos Haremos Historia	42.2484
2024	Claudia Sheinbaum Pardo	Sigamos Haciendo Historia	53.9605
