= Radio y Televisión de Nuevo León =

Logo of RTV Nuevo León

Radio y Televisión de Nuevo León (abbreviated RTV Nuevo León or RTVNL) is the radio and television service of the government of Nuevo León. It operates a television network with 24 transmitters and nine radio stations.

== History ==
=== Radio ===
The state entered broadcasting in March 1978 when it signed on XHQI-FM 102.1 in Monterrey, known as "Radio Gobierno", adding XEQI-AM 1510 to its stable the next year. The service expanded outside of Monterrey in 1983 when the state built stations in Cerralvo, Sabinas Hidalgo, Montemorelos and Linares, and again in late 1988 and early 1989 with the addition of services for Ciudad Anáhuac, Galeana and Doctor Arroyo.

=== Television ===
On May 14, 1982, XHMNL-TV channel 28 signed on in Monterrey, operating from the 27th and 28th floors of the Latina Building as a repeater of Televisión Rural de México. TRM was an educational and cultural network subsumed into Imevisión, but in 1984 channel 28 came under the control of the state government, and the next year it moved to new facilities. In the 1990s, channel 28 went statewide and built 23 transmitters across the state.

In 2008, the radio and TV departments were combined.

== Radio stations ==
The radio services are known as Radio Nuevo León, though they each have their own name, format and some of their own programming.

- XHQI-FM 102.1 Monterrey
- XEQI-AM 1510 Monterrey
- XHAHU-FM 103.3 Anáhuac
- XHCER-FM 100.7 Cerralvo
- XHARR-FM 96.5 Doctor Arroyo
- XHGAL-FM 93.7 Galeana
- XHNAR-FM 103.3 Linares
- XHLOS-FM 97.7 Montemorelos
- XHSAB-FM 89.5 Sabinas Hidalgo
