= Chocolate (disambiguation) =

Chocolate is a food made from roasted and ground cacao seed kernels.

Chocolate may also refer to:

== Geography ==
- Chocolate, Mexico
- Chocolate Hills, Bohol, Philippines
- Chocolate Mountains (Arizona), United States
- Chocolate Mountains, California, United States

== Arts, entertainment, and media ==
=== Films ===
- Chocolat (2000 film), a Hallström romantic drama film
- Chocklet, a 2001 Indian Tamil film starring Prashanth
- Chocolate (2005 film), a 2005 Indian Hindi film
- Chocolate (2007 film), an Indian Malayalam film
- Chocolate (2008 film), a Thai martial arts film

=== Literature ===
- Chocolate, a 1922 novel by Alexander Tarasov-Rodionov

=== Music ===
==== Groups ====
- Chocolate (band), a Uruguayan musical group
- Hot Chocolate, a British soul band

==== Songs ====
- "Chocolate" (Jesse & Joy song)
- "Chocolate" (Kylie Minogue song)
- "Chocolate" (Snow Patrol song)
- "Chocolate" (The 1975 song)
- "Chocolate" (The Time song)
- "Chocolate (Choco Choco)", a 2004 song by Soul Control
- "Chocolate", a 2020 song by Max Changmin from his album Chocolate
- "Chocolate", a 2022 song by Quavo and Takeoff

=== Television ===
- "Chocolate" (Masters of Horror), an episode of Masters of Horror
- Kim Jung Eun's Chocolate, a music television program
- Chocolate (Malayalam TV series), a 2019 Indian Malayalam television series
- Chocolate (Tamil TV series), a 2019 Indian Tamil television series
- Chocolate (South Korean TV series), a 2019 South Korean television series

== Brands and enterprises ==
- Chocolate Skateboards, a skateboard distribution company
- LG Chocolate, a mobile phone

== Other uses ==
- Chocolate (color)
- Chocolate gourami, a fish
- Chokoleit (1970–2019), Filipino actor and comedian

== See also ==
- Chocolatey (software package manager), a software distribution system
- Chocolat (disambiguation)
- Military chocolate (disambiguation)
