= Alejo Garza Tamez =

Mexican businessman (1933–2010)

- Born: July 17, 1933; Allende, Nuevo León, Mexico
- Died: November 14, 2010 (aged 77); Padilla, Tamaulipas, Mexico
- Cause of death: Gunshot wounds
- Other name: Don Alejo
- Occupations: Businessman, hunter, poultry farmer, rancher
- Known for: Armed confrontation against organized criminals.

Alejo Garza Tamez (July 17, 1933 – November 14, 2010), better known as Don Alejo, was a Mexican businessman, rancher, and recreational hunter. Don Alejo gained fame after making a last stand against the Los Zetas cartel in defense of his ranch near Ciudad Victoria, Tamaulipas.

== Biography ==
Alejo Garza Tamez was born on July 17, 1933, in Allende, Nuevo León, a northern Mexican town 50 kilometers southeast of Monterrey. Tamez spent most of his childhood in the wooded hills of Nuevo León. Alejo's father, José, owned a sawmill, and together with his brothers Alejo helped his father harvest and sell lumber at their stores in Montemorelos and Allende.

Alejo suggested poultry farming to local farmers as an alternative to orange plantations.

Alejo was a hunter and fisherman, helping establish a hunting, fishing, and shooting club in Allende. Alejo gained a reputation as a good marksman, specializing in hunting doves, geese, and deer. Subsequently, he began to acquire a collection of sporting rifles.

With the assistance of his brother, Alejo bought the "San José" ranch in Tamaulipas, located 15 kilometers from Ciudad Victoria.

== Ranch siege and death ==
Members of the Los Zetas cartel demanded Alejo hand over his ranch property on November 13, 2010, giving him 24 hours to comply. Alejo, aged 77, refused to hand the property over. He rounded up the farm workers and ordered them to take the next day off. Alejo then took his firearms from his cellar and placed the weapons by his doors and windows, utilizing his extensive collection of hunting and sporting weapons.

The following morning, the cartel vehicles entered the ranch and were placed near the entrance to Alejo's house. The assassins fired a warning shot into the air and proclaimed they would forcefully seize the ranch. Garza Tamez responded with gunfire, and thus, the armed gang responded by opening fire on the house, using rifles and grenades. Despite the numerical superiority of the cartel members, they were unable to take the ranch and fled before the arrival of Mexican Marines. Don Alejo took cover in the farmhouse, killing four of the attackers while wounding two others.

Mexican Navy units entered the property to find a deserted house partially destroyed by bullet holes and grenade explosions. They found six abandoned bodies on the outside of the farm, four dead and two unconscious. Inside the house, they found only the body of Alejo Garza Tamez with two bullet wounds, one in the chest and the other in the head. Upon inspection, it was determined that Tamez suffered serious injuries from grenade shrapnel as well. It was revealed that guns and shell casings were found next to doors and windows. It was understood that Alejo had designed his strategy to fight alone, placing weapons strategically beside doors and windows.

== Aftermath ==
Initially, many local media institutions deferred publishing news of the siege due to the administrative power of the Los Zetas cartel. However, the Milenio newspaper widely reported the events, and the story quickly spread throughout Mexican social media sites. Don Alejo promptly became a cultural icon for defending himself against organized crime.

Despite the significant media attention, no investigation into Alejo's murder has taken place, nor have any charges been issued against the Los Zetas cartel.

However, Alejo remains a prominent cultural icon.

== In popular culture ==
- Various Mexican musicians have composed corridos in remembrance of Alejo.
- American writer Don Winslow novelized Alejo's stand in his book The Cartel (2015).
- Alejo is the subject of the independent film Massacre in San José by Mexican director Edgar Nito.
- In 2019, Italian comics publisher Panini Comics published a story: "El Viejo y El Narco" (The Old Man and the Narco).
- The scene of the last stand in Rambo: Last Blood (2019) is similar to Alejo's gunfight.
