= Chocolat =

Chocolat is the French word for Chocolate. The term may also refer to:

- Shokolad, a 1922 novel by Alexander Tarasov-Rodionov
- Chocolat (novel), a 1999 novel by Joanne Harris.
- Chocolat (1988 film), a French film by Claire Denis about a family in Cameroon
- Chocolat (2000 film), an adaptation of the Joanne Harris novel, about a woman who opens a chocolaterie
- Chocolat (2016 film), a French film
- Chocolat (manga), a Japanese manga written and illustrated by Eisaku Kubonouchi
- Chocolat (manhwa), a manhwa written by Shin Ji-sang and illustrated by Geo
- Chocolat (singer) (born 1978), Japanese singer
- Chocolat (group), a South Korean girl group
- Chocolat (clown) (c. 1868–1917), French circus artist of Afro-Cuban descent
- Mount Chocolat, a mountain in Les Etchemins Regional County Municipality, Chaudière-Appalaches, Quebec, Canada

== See also ==
- Chocolate (disambiguation)
