= Allende, Nuevo León =

Allende Municipality
- Municipality
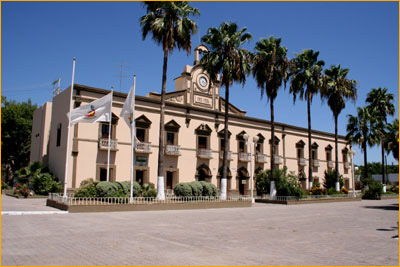

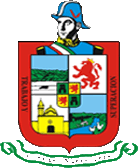
- Coat of arms

- Location within Nuevo León Location within Mexico
- Coordinates: 25°17′N 100°01′W
- Country: Mexico
- State: Nuevo León
- Municipal seat: Allende

Government
  - Municipal president: Eduardo Leal Buenfil
  - Federal electoral district: Nuevo León's 9th

Area
  - Total: 186 km^{2} (72 sq mi)
- Elevation: 460 m (1,510 ft)

Population (2020 census)
  - Total: 35,289
  - Density: 190/km^{2} (491/sq mi)
- Time zone: UTC-6 (Zona Centro)

Allende is a municipality located in the northeastern Mexican state of Nuevo León. It comprises a region known as Región Citrícola (Citrus Region), for being a major producer of orange at local, national and even international level. Allende is located at the Sierra Madre Oriental range foothills in the central-southeastern part in the state of Nuevo León. It has a territorial extension of 148.5 km^{2}, comprising around 0.22% of the whole extension of Nuevo León. Given its geographic location, the region consists of valleys and hills ranging from 300 meters above sea level on the northeast, to 1,640 meters above sea level in the southwestern part of the municipality. According to the 2010 census data, it had a population of 32,581, of whom 16,436 were men and 16,145 were women. The main economic activities are agriculture, livestock, beekeeping (Allende is one of the largest producers of honey in Mexico), poultry and transportation, activities that generate many jobs in the region.

== Geography ==
The municipality is located around 46.7 kilometres (29.0 mi) on the highway to Linares, southwards Monterrey. It borders the municipality of Santiago to the north and northeast, going throughout the Sierra Madre Oriental and the stream of Cerro Las Cruces. It's also bounded on the north by the municipality of Cadereyta Jiménez, having as natural boundary streams of the Lazarillos and Los Nogales, where they converge with Ramos River. Allende also borders the municipality of Montemorelos to the northeast, east, southeast and south.

== History ==
Prior the arrival of the first Spanish settlers to the New Kingdom of León in the late sixteenth century, these lands were inhabited by a group of indigenous people of Chichimeca origin called Huachichiles, that prevented the penetration of settlers to the region called "Cuarisezapa" that stretched from the outskirts of Monterrey until Guajuco Valley in what today are the municipalities of Santiago and Allende, they were shortly expelled when the Spanish arrived.

The Spanish promoted the colonization of the area and founded the Cuarisezapa Guajuco Valley, comprising an area to the Ramos river. Its first settler was Captain Diego Rodriguez de Montemayor, grandson of the founder of Monterrey Diego de Montemayor, who received a grant from Governor Martin de Zavala in 1646 and two years later expanded it by a purchase to Diego Fernandez de Montemayor. When he died, his widow Ines de la Garza with her children continued working on livestock, agriculture in the haciendas.

General Luis Garcia de Pruneda owned large estates in the vicinity of these lands by the 1700s, when he died in 1739, he desired that a part of his properties were devoted to charitable works, so in 1749 was promoted the creation of two chaplaincies that included what today are the municipalities of Allende, Cadereyta Jimenez and Montemorelos.

== Government ==
=== Municipal presidents ===
| Term | Municipal president | Political party | Notes |
|---|---|---|---|
| 1939-1940 | Baudelio E. Salazar Garza | PRM | |
| 1941-1942 | Ciro Tamez Lozano | PRM | |
| 1943-1945 | Cruz Rodríguez Cavazos | PRM | |
| 1946-1946 | Reynaldo Marroquín Garza | PRI | Acting municipal president |
| 1946-1947 | Rogelio Salazar M. | PRI | |
| 1948-1951 | Hermenegildo Leal | PRI | |
| 1952-1954 | José Tamez Leal | PRI | |
| 1955-1957 | Rogelio Salazar Martínez | PRI | |
| 1958-1960 | Tobías Villalón Cavazos | PRI | |
| 1961-1963 | Rogelio Salazar Cavazos | PRI | |
| 1964-1966 | Ramón Flores Aguirre | PRI | |
| 1967-1969 | Héctor Tamez Rodríguez | PRI | |
| 1970-1971 | David Cardoso Tamez | PRI | |
| 1972-1973 | Rubén G. Cavazos Cardoso | PRI | |
| 1974-1976 | Gerardo H. Leal Silva | PRI | |
| 1977-1979 | Antonio Javier Cavazos Flores | PRI | |
| 1980-1982 | Gilberto Tamez Rodríguez | PRI | |
| 1983-1985 | Jorge Salazar Suárez | PRI | |
| 1986-1988 | Roberto Aguirre Vega | PRI | |
| 1989-1991 | Juventino Fernández González | PRI | |
| 1991 | Juan Alonso García Moya | PRI | Acting municipal president |
| 1992-1994 | Jorge Heriberto Salazar Salazar | PRI | |
| 1994 | Juana Aurora Cavazos C. | PRI | Acting municipal president |
| 1995-1997 | José Luis Rodríguez Cavazos | PRI | |
| 1997-2000 | Ramiro Tamez Martínez | PRI | |
| 2000-2003 | Adrián Antonio Cavazos Parra | PRI | |
| 2003-2006 | Sergio Alejandro Alanís Marroquín | PRI | |
| 2006-2009 | Luis Gerardo Marroquín Salazar | PRI | |
| 2009-2012 | Jorge Alberto Salazar Salazar | PRI | |
| 2006-2009 | Luis Gerardo Marroquín Salazar | PRI | |
| 2009-2012 | Jorge Alberto Salazar Salazar | PRI | |
| 2012-2015 | Jaime Salazar Marroquín | PRI | |
| 2015-2018 | Silverio Manuel Flores Leal | PAN | |
| 2018-2021 | Eva Patricia Salazar Marroquín | PRI | |
| 2021-2024 | Eva Patricia Salazar Marroquín | PRI; PRD | She was reelected on 06/06/2021 |
| 2024- | Eduardo Leal Buenfil | PAN | |

== Tourism ==
The Ramos River attracts many visitors for its landscapes, another tourist site is El paseo de la Loma de la Santa Cruz (Loma de la Santa Cruz's walk) which offers a panoramic view from the municipal seat. Other tourist sites are the Plaza Zaragoza, in front of town Hall and Plaza Mariano Escobedo. The Parroquia de San Pedro Apóstol (Parish of St. Peter Apostle), which is a modern building on a smaller scale replica of St. Peter's Basilica in Rome, the Museum of Anthropology, History and Culture House in the Old Temple, the shrine of Our Lady of Light at Rancho El Cerro, the Hacienda del provisor, the collection gallery of Bernardo Flores Salazar and the municipal palace.

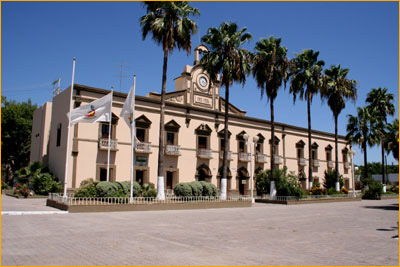

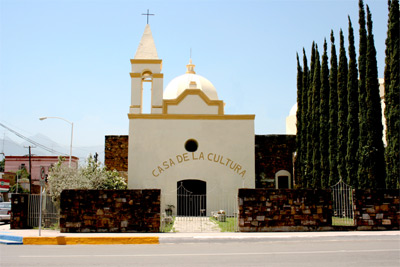
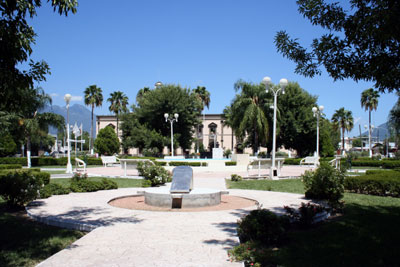
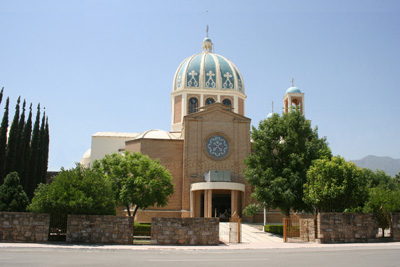
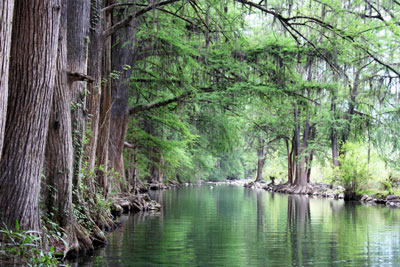

Museums

The ancient temple of San Pedro Apostol, is now a museum that houses the history and culture of the municipality, along with antiquities of items and depictions of life-style of the town.
