= 9th federal electoral district of Nuevo León =

Federal electoral district of Mexico

Nuevo León's 9th
- Electoral district of the Chamber of Deputies of Mexico

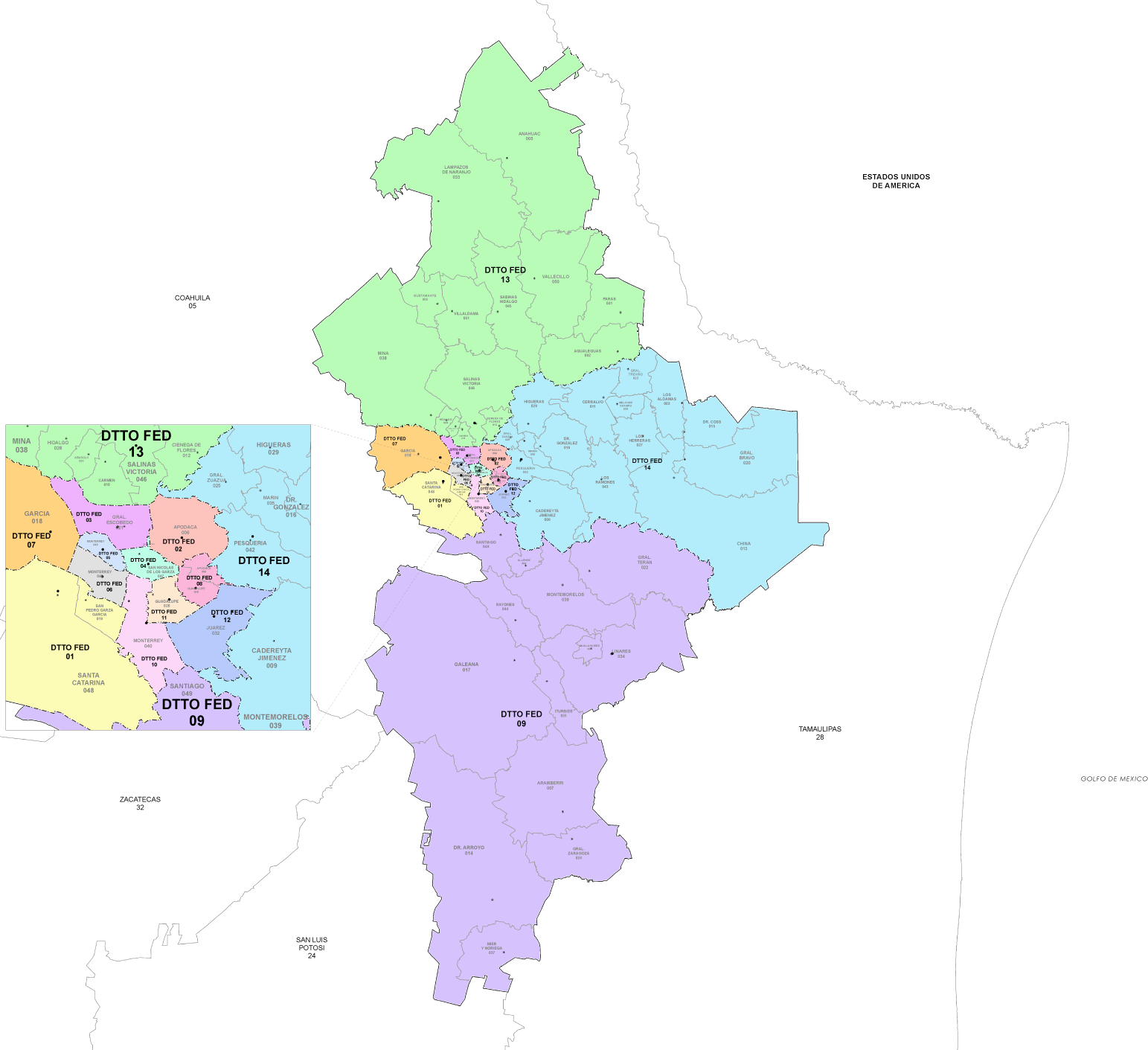
- 9th district

Incumbent
- Member: Juan Francisco Espinoza Eguía
- Party: ▌Institutional Revolutionary Party
- Congress: 66th (2024–2027)

District
- State: Nuevo León
- Head town: Linares
- Coordinates: 24°51′N 99°34′W
- Covers: 13 municipalities: Allende, Aramberri, Doctor Arroyo, Galeana, General Terán, General Zaragoza, Hualahuises, Iturbide, Linares, Mier y Noriega, Montemorelos, Rayones, Santiago
- PR region: Second
- Precincts: 274
- Population: 370,547 (2020 census)

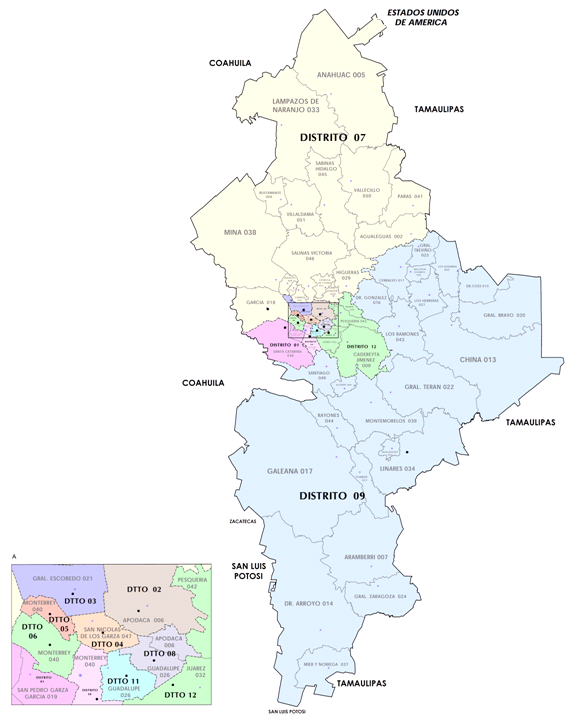
Nuevo León's districts in 2017–2022

The 9th federal electoral district of Nuevo León (Spanish: Distrito electoral federal 09 de Nuevo León) is one of the 300 electoral districts into which Mexico is divided for elections to the federal Chamber of Deputies and one of 14 such districts in the state of Nuevo León.

It elects one deputy to the lower house of Congress for each three-year legislative session by means of the first-past-the-post system. Votes cast in the district also count towards the calculation of proportional representation ("plurinominal") deputies elected from the second region.

The 9th district was created by the 1977 electoral reforms and was first contested in the 1979 mid-term election.

The current member for the district, re-elected in the 2024 general election, is Juan Francisco Espinoza Eguía of the Institutional Revolutionary Party (PRI).

== District territory ==
In its 2023 districting plan, which is to be used for the 2024, 2027 and 2030 federal elections, the National Electoral Institute (INE) increased Nuevo León's congressional seat allocation from 12 to 14. The reconfigured 9th district covers 274 electoral precincts (secciones electorales) across 13 municipalities in the south of the state:

- Allende, Aramberri, Doctor Arroyo, Galeana, General Terán, General Zaragoza, Hualahuises, Iturbide, Linares, Mier y Noriega, Montemorelos, Rayones and Santiago.

The district's head town (cabecera distrital), where results from individual polling stations are gathered together and tallied, is the city of Linares. The district reported a population of 370,547 in the 2020 census.

== Previous districting schemes ==
Evolution of electoral district numbers
	1974	1978	1996	2005	2017	2023
Nuevo León	7	11	11	12	12	14
Chamber of Deputies	196	300				

2017–2022

Between 2017 and 2022, the district's head town was at Linares and it covered 355 precincts across 23 municipalities:
- Los Aldamas, Allende, Aramberri, Cerralvo, China, Doctor Arroyo, Doctor Coss, Doctor González, Galeana, General Bravo, General Terán, General Treviño, General Zaragoza, Los Herreras, Hualahuises, Iturbide, Linares, Melchor Ocampo, Mier y Noriega, Montemorelos, Los Ramones, Rayones and Santiago.

2005–2017

Under the 2005 districting plan, the district covered 325 precincts across 16 municipalities:
- Allende, Aramberri, China, Doctor Arroyo, Doctor Coss, Galeana, General Bravo, General Teran, General Zaragoza, Hualahuises, Iturbide, Linares, Mier y Noriega, Montemorelos, Rayones and Santiago.

1996–2005

From 1996 to 2005, the district's head town was at Linares and it covered 14 municipalities:
- Allende, Aramberri, Doctor Arroyo, Galeana, General Terán, General Zaragoza, Hualahuises, Iturbide, Juárez, Linares, Mier y Noriega, Montemorelos, Rayones and Santiago.

1978–1996

The districting scheme in force from 1978 to 1996 was the result of the 1977 electoral reforms, which increased the number of single-member seats in the Chamber of Deputies from 196 to 300. Under that plan, Nuevo León's seat allocation rose from 7 to 11. The newly created 9th district's head town was at Guadalupe and it covered a part of that city.

== Deputies returned to Congress ==
(Mexico) National parties
- Current
- PAN
- PRI
- PT
- PVEM
- MC
- Morena
- PAZ
- Somos
- Defunct or local only
- PLM
- PNR
- PRM
- PNM
- PP
- PPS
- PARM
- PFCRN
- CON
- PANAL
- PSD
- PES
- PES
- PRD

Nuevo León's 9th district
Election	Deputy	Party	Term	Legislature
1979	Amparo Aguirre Hernández	Institutional Revolutionary Party	1979–1982	51st Congress
1982	Alejandro Lambretón Narro	Institutional Revolutionary Party	1982–1985	52nd Congress
1985	Humberto Cervantes Vega	Institutional Revolutionary Party	1985–1988	53rd Congress
1988	María Elena Chapa Hernández	Institutional Revolutionary Party	1988–1991	54th Congress
1991	Erasmo Garza Elizondo	Institutional Revolutionary Party	1991–1994	55th Congress
1994	María Cristina Díaz Salazar	Institutional Revolutionary Party	1994–1997	56th Congress
1997	Arturo Charles Charles	Institutional Revolutionary Party	1997–2000	57th Congress
2000	Juan Paredes Gloria	Institutional Revolutionary Party	2000–2003	58th Congress
2003	Adrián Villagómez García	Institutional Revolutionary Party	2003–2006	59th Congress
2006	Ramón Salas López	Institutional Revolutionary Party	2006–2009	60th Congress
2009	Fermín Montes Cavazos	Institutional Revolutionary Party	2009–2012	61st Congress
2012	Marco Antonio González Valdez	Institutional Revolutionary Party	2012–2015	62nd Congress
2015	Ramón Villagómez Guerrero	Institutional Revolutionary Party	2015–2018	63rd Congress
2018	Juan Francisco Espinoza Eguía	Institutional Revolutionary Party	2018–2021	64th Congress
2021	Juan Francisco Espinoza Eguía	Institutional Revolutionary Party	2021–2024	65th Congress
2024	Juan Francisco Espinoza Eguía	Institutional Revolutionary Party	2024–2027	66th Congress

== Presidential elections ==
Nuevo León's 9th district
Election	District won by	Party or coalition	%
2018	Andrés Manuel López Obrador	Juntos Haremos Historia	28.7254
2024	Claudia Sheinbaum Pardo	Sigamos Haciendo Historia	44.1976
