= General Zaragoza, Nuevo León =

Human settlement in Mexico

General Zaragoza
- Interactive map of General Zaragoza

Government
  - Mayor: Judith Amaranta Ibarra Rodríguez (MC)
  - Federal electoral district: Nuevo León's 9th

Population (2020)
  - Total: 6,282 (municipality)
- Time zone: UTC-6 (Zona Centro)
- Website: generalzaragozanl.gob.mx

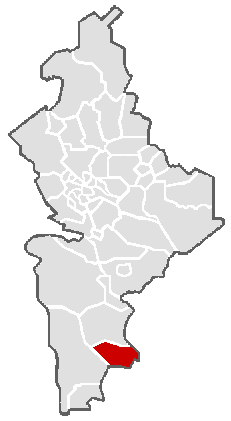
The location of the Municipality of Zaragoza in the Mexican state of Nuevo León.

General Zaragoza is a municipality and town of the northeastern Mexican state of Nuevo León. It is located in the south-eastern part of the state. In 2023, Zaragoza was designated a Pueblo Mágico by the Mexican government, recognizing its cultural and historical importance. The town is at 23°58′25″N 99°46′23″W. The municipality has a total area of 508 square miles (1,315 km^{2}) and had a population of 6,282 in 2020. Most of the population lives in the town of Zaragoza. The elevation of Zaragoza is 4,520 feet (1,379 m). Zaragoza is bordered by Aramberri, on the south and east by Hidalgo, Tamaulipas, and on the west by Doctor Arroyo.

Zaragoza is named in honor of General Ignacio Zaragoza who fought against the French invaders at the Battle of Puebla on May 5, 1862.

== History ==
The original inhabitants of the Zaragoza region were nomadic Indian bands the Spanish called Negritos or Bozalos and Janambres. In 1626, a Franciscan priest, Lorenzo Cantú from the convent at Charcas, followed a group of Indians to the valley of the Rio Blanco where he founded the Misión de San Josè del Rio Blanco near the site of Zaragoza. In 1866, the municipality of Villa de General Zaragoza was created by the government.

== Geography ==
Zaragoza is at the head of the semi-arid valley of the Rio Blanco (White River), the uppermost part of the Soto La Marina River system. Some of the highest mountains of the Sierra Madre Oriental are in the Zaragoza municipality. Cerro Zaragoza which rises to 11,352 feet (3,449 m) is three miles northeast of Zaragoza town. Cerro Peña Nevada, 11,682 feet (3,562 m) is nine miles southwest of Zaragoza town, just across the border in Tamaulipas. Pine and Oak forests cloak the mountains. One to two miles south of town are three waterfalls—15, 20, and 25 meters high (49, 65, and 82 feet high) -- which are tourist attractions.

=== Climate ===
In a semi-arid zone with precipitation at most locations less than 20 inches (500mm), Zaragoza is well-favored with rainfall with 28.7 inches (730mm) annually. Some of the mountains around Zaragoza receive more precipitation, including snow at higher elevations, than the town and valley. Zaragoza Este, one mile east of the town, at an elevation of 5,830 feet (1,777 m), receives 49.2 inches (1250 mm) of precipitation annually. Throughout the area most precipitation falls in the summer. The rainy season usually begins at the end of April and continues until the end of September. In the region around Zaragoza, August and September are usually the rainiest months. Temperatures are normally mild, although occasional days are very hot and the temperature falls below freezing several times each year.

Climate data for General Zaragoza, Nuevo Leon (1978–2010)
Month	Jan	Feb	Mar	Apr	May	Jun	Jul	Aug	Sep	Oct	Nov	Dec	Year
Record high °C (°F)	37.0 (98.6)	39.0 (102.2)	43.0 (109.4)	43.0 (109.4)	49.0 (120.2)	42.0 (107.6)	42.0 (107.6)	43.0 (109.4)	39.0 (102.2)	42.0 (107.6)	38.0 (100.4)	37.0 (98.6)	49.0 (120.2)
Mean daily maximum °C (°F)	18.5 (65.3)	21.2 (70.2)	23.5 (74.3)	24.1 (75.4)	27.8 (82.0)	27.7 (81.9)	26.7 (80.1)	27.4 (81.3)	25.1 (77.2)	23.5 (74.3)	22.1 (71.8)	19.5 (67.1)	23.9 (75.0)
Daily mean °C (°F)	12.1 (53.8)	13.9 (57.0)	16.4 (61.5)	17.3 (63.1)	20.3 (68.5)	20.4 (68.7)	19.7 (67.5)	20.1 (68.2)	18.6 (65.5)	17.1 (62.8)	15.3 (59.5)	13.2 (55.8)	17.0 (62.6)
Mean daily minimum °C (°F)	5.7 (42.3)	6.6 (43.9)	9.2 (48.6)	10.4 (50.7)	12.9 (55.2)	13.1 (55.6)	12.7 (54.9)	12.8 (55.0)	12.1 (53.8)	10.6 (51.1)	8.4 (47.1)	6.9 (44.4)	10.1 (50.2)
Record low °C (°F)	−9 (16)	−9.0 (15.8)	−3.0 (26.6)	0 (32)	1.0 (33.8)	4.0 (39.2)	1.0 (33.8)	1.0 (33.8)	0 (32)	2.0 (35.6)	−7.0 (19.4)	−10.0 (14.0)	−10.0 (14.0)
Average precipitation mm (inches)	20.0 (0.79)	14.0 (0.55)	17.0 (0.67)	47.0 (1.85)	181.0 (7.13)	92.0 (3.62)	58.0 (2.28)	117.0 (4.61)	95.0 (3.74)	18.0 (0.71)	17.0 (0.67)	19.0 (0.75)	730.0 (28.74)
Average precipitation days (≥ 0.1 mm)	2.6	1.8	2.0	4.6	8.1	8.0	6.9	8.8	8.6	4.6	2.4	3.6	62.2
Source 1: Weatherbase: Zargoza, Nuevo León
Source 2: Servicio Meteorológico Nacional (normals)

The climatic classification of Zaragoza is Bsk (Koppen) and Bsak (Trewartha). Higher elevations near the town are cooler and more humid, some becoming Cw climates.
