= Marcela Guerra Castillo =

Mexican politician

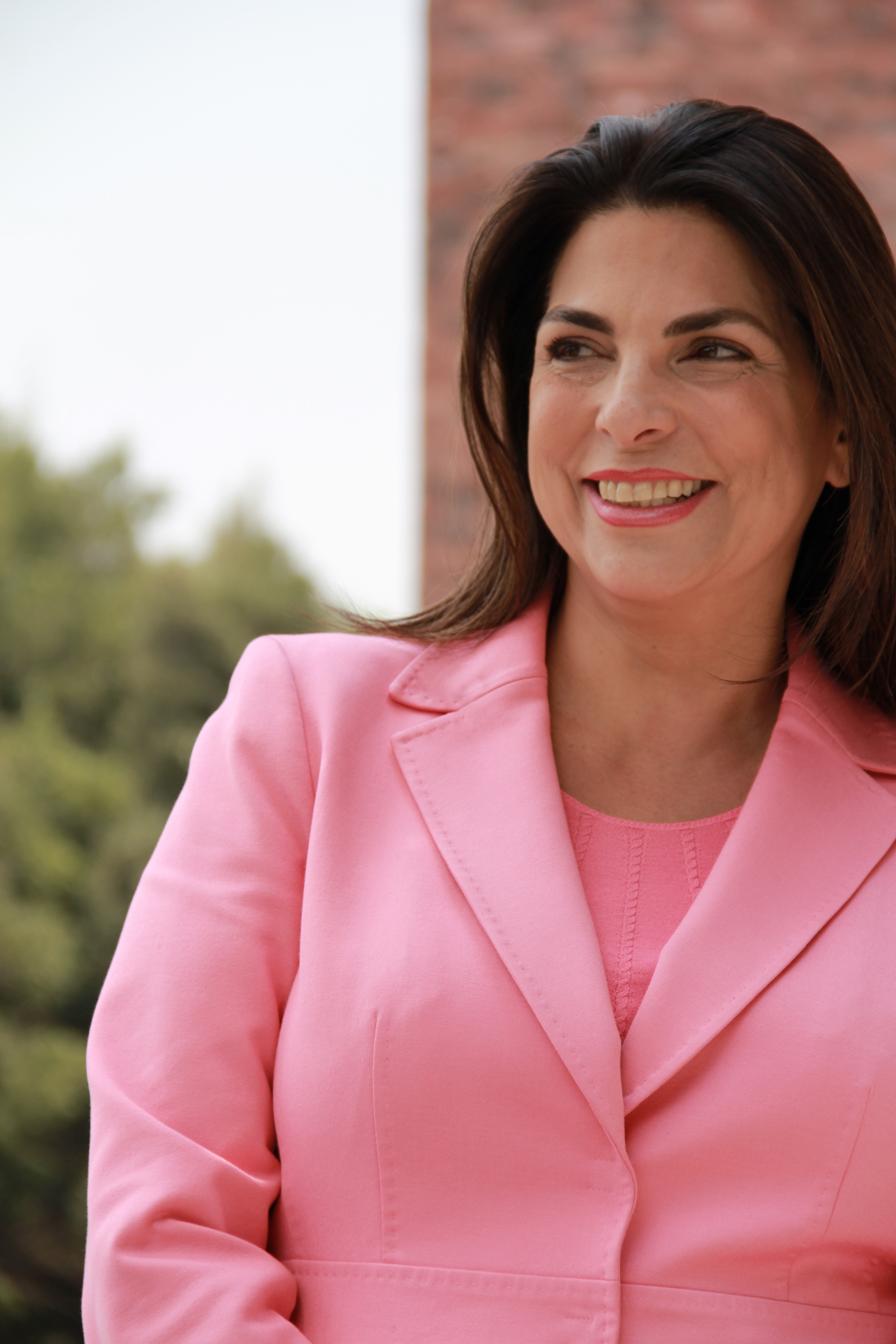
- Guerra in 2011

Member of the Chamber of Deputies Proportional representation
- Incumbent
- Assumed office 1 September 2024

President of the Chamber of Deputies of Mexico
- In office 1 September 2023 – 31 August 2024
- Preceded by: Santiago Creel (Note: Following Creel's leave of absence from the Chamber of Deputies, Noemí Luna Ayala served as acting president beginning on 14 August 2023. She remained in the role until the next legislative session, when Guerra Castillo was elected president.)
- Succeeded by: Ifigenia Martínez y Hernández

Member of the Chamber of Deputies from Nuevo León's 5th district
- In office 1 September 2021 – 31 August 2024
- Preceded by: Santiago González Soto
- Succeeded by: Santiago González Soto
- In office 1 September 2009 – 31 August 2012
- Preceded by: Gustavo Caballero Camargo
- Succeeded by: Héctor Gutiérrez De la Garza
- In office 1 September 2003 – 31 August 2006
- Preceded by: Eloy Cantú Segovia
- Succeeded by: Gustavo Caballero Camargo

Senator of the Republic from Nuevo León First formula
- In office 1 September 2012 – 27 January 2018
- Preceded by: Fernando Elizondo Barragán
- Succeeded by: Eva Patricia Salazar Marroquín

Member of the Congress of Nuevo León Proportional representation
- In office 15 October 2000 – 14 October 2003

Personal details
- Born: 7 November 1959 (age 66) Monterrey, Nuevo León, Mexico
- Party: Institutional Revolutionary Party
- Education: Monterrey Institute of Technology and Higher Education (BBA); National Autonomous University of Mexico (LLM)
- Website: www.marcelaguerra.org

Marcela Guerra Castillo (born 7 November 1959) is a Mexican politician from Nuevo León. She was a local deputy in the Congress of Nuevo León and twice a federal deputy in the Congress of Mexico. From 2012 to 2018, she was a senator representing the state of Nuevo León in the LXII and LXIII Legislatures of the Mexican Congress.

== Early life and education ==
Marcela Guerra was born on 7 November 1959 in Monterrey, Nuevo León, Mexico. She studied at the Monterrey Institute of Technology, where she graduated from the Business Administration School, and studied Civilization History at the Sorbonne University and the Institut Catholique de Paris.

She has participated in several seminars and courses, including the Executive Seminar "Opportunities and Challenges of Mexico's Future: Leadership and Performance Strategies" by Harvard Kennedy School and the Seminar "Foreign Policy and Global Agenda" imparted by the Matias Romero Institute of the Secretariat of Foreign Affairs.

== Elected office ==
=== Nuevo León's LXIX Legislature ===
From 2000 to 2003, Guerra served as a local deputy in the 8th federal electoral district of Nuevo León for the LXIX (69th) Legislature of the Congress of Nuevo León.

During her term, she held leadership positions in several legislative areas, including municipal development, civic oversight, and financing. She was also involved in human development policy.

=== LIX Legislature of the Mexican Congress ===
From 2003 to 2006, Guerra served as a federal deputy in the LIX (59th) Legislature of the Mexican Congress, where she represented the 5th federal electoral district of Nuevo León.

During her term, she was involved in committees spanning oversight, culture, and innovation. She served on committees addressing public service, federal auditing, science and technology, as well as holding a secretary position on media regulation. She was also a member of the Superior Auditor of the Federation.

=== LXI Legislature of the Mexican Congress ===
From 2009 to 2012, Guerra served as a federal deputy in the LXI (61st) Legislature of the Mexican Congress, representing the 5th federal electoral district of Nuevo León for the second time.

During this term, she was involved in committees on gender equality. She also served as a member of the Inter-Parliamentary Union, advocating for legislation in favor of women.

=== LXII Legislature of the Mexican Congress ===
From 2012 to 2018, Guerra served as a senator in the LXII (62nd) Legislature of the Mexican Congress, representing the state of Nuevo León. In this legislature, she was a member of the Committees on Economic Development and on Radio, Television and Cinematography; she likewise served as Secretary of the Commission of Foreign Affairs and President of the North America Foreign Affairs Committee.

She is also the Mexican Congress's Delegation Chair for ParlAméricas, Mexico's representative on the Administration Council and ParlAméricas's executive committee, as well as a member of the Inter-Parliamentary Union.

== Partisan activity ==
In 1996, Guerra served as Secretary General of the Commission on Women's Affairs at the Colosio Foundation.

In the 2012 federal elections, she ran as a Senate candidate for the state of Nuevo León together with Ivonne Álvarez, former mayor of Guadalupe municipality. The PRI nominated the two women for the Mexican Senate.

== Other Involvement ==
=== Cultural organizations ===
Guerra served as General Coordinator of Monterrey's City Theatre from 1984 to 1987. She also served as Director of Nuevo León's Museum of History from 1991 to 1994.

In 1993, she served as General Manager of the project for the construction of the Museum of Mexican History in Monterrey, where she worked as deputy director until 1996. In 1996, she was named Fundidora Park's Conservation Projects Director, which she managed until 1998.

=== Civil society organizations ===
Guerra Castillo was Secretary of the Progressive Liberal Political Association in 2000, Founder and Counselor of the Women's Plural Pact in 1998, and President of the Bienestar y Vida Association (Welfare and Life Association) from 1998 until 2001.

=== Books ===
Guerra Castillo is the author of several books, such as Crisol del temple, la historia de la Fundidora de Hierro y Acero de Monterrey, which is about the history of Fundidora Park, and Contigo, Manual y Guía para las familias que viven en la discapacidad, which helps families who live with a disabled family member.

=== Print and electronic media ===
From 1982 to 1987, she collaborated with the El Norte newspaper. In 1987, she hosted the show Buenos Días (Good Morning). In 2002, she was a political commentator for the news show on Núcleo Radio Monterrey's station. She has been a collaborator and editorialist on political subjects for Televisa Monterrey and Milenio Television's Según Ellas show.

== Notes ==
Preceded by Fernando Elizondo Barragán	Mexico Senator from Nuevo León; 2012 – present	Succeeded by Incumbent
Preceded by Gustavo Caballero Camargo	Federal Deputy from Nuevo León's 5th federal district 2009–2012	Succeeded by Héctor Gutiérrez de la Garza
Preceded by Eloy Cantú Segovia	Federal Deputy from Nuevo León's 5th federal district 2003–2006	Succeeded by Gustavo Caballero Camargo
