= XHGAL-FM =

Radio station in Galeana, Nuevo León

- Galeana, Nuevo León; Mexico
- Frequency: 93.7 FM
- Branding: Vive FM

Programming
- Format: Public radio/music

Ownership
- Owner: Radio y Televisión de Nuevo León; (Government of the State of Nuevo León)

History
- First air date: 1988
- Call sign meaning: GALeana

Technical information
- Licensing authority: CRT
- Class: B1
- ERP: 25 kW
- HAAT: 16.8 m
- Transmitter coordinates: 24°49′29″N 100°04′43″W

Links
- Website: srtvnl.com/vive-fm/

XHGAL-FM (93.7 FM) is a radio station in Galeana, Nuevo León, known as Vive FM. XHGAL is part of the Nuevo León state-owned Radio Nuevo León public network.
