= Ramón Salas López =

Mexican politician (born 1959)

- Born: 21 August 1959 (age 66); Nuevo León, Mexico
- Occupation: Politician
- Political party: PRI

Ramón Salas López (born 21 August 1959) is a Mexican politician affiliated with the Institutional Revolutionary Party (PRI).

From 2000 to 2003 he was a local deputy in the 69th session of the Congress of Nuevo León. He also served two terms as municipal president of Doctor Arroyo, Nuevo León, from 1992 to 1994 and from 2003 to 2006.

In the 2006 general election he was elected to the Chamber of Deputies to represent Nuevo León's 9th district during the 60th session of Congress.
