= Marco Antonio González Valdez =

Mexican politician

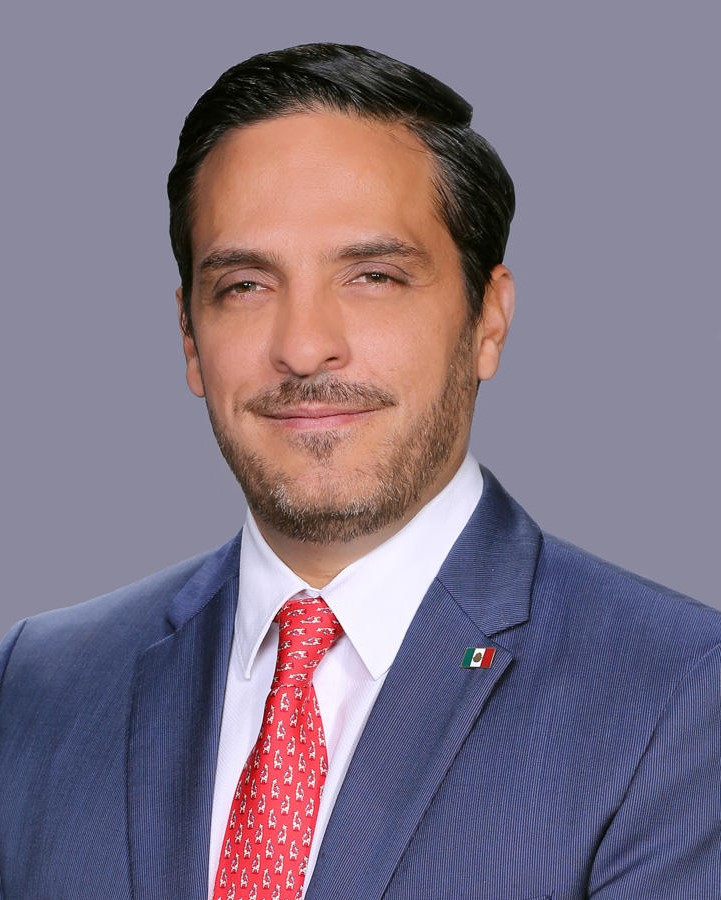
- Official portrait, 2018
- Born: 24 October 1972 (age 53); Nuevo León, Mexico
- Political party: MORENA

Marco Antonio González Valdez (born 24 October 1972) is a Mexican politician. He is affiliated with the National Regeneration Movement (MORENA). In the 2012 general election, he was elected to the Chamber of Deputies to represent Nuevo León's 9th district during the 62nd Congress for the Institutional Revolutionary Party.

== Early life ==
Valdez pursued a career in International Trade at the Monterrey Institute of Technology and Higher Education (ITESM), earning a Certificate of Special Studies in Administration and Management from Harvard University, and two Masters from the London School of Economics and Political Science (LSE), in Social Policy and Planning in Developing Countries and in Public Administration and Public Policy. He graduated with a Doctor of Regional Development from Oxford University.

== Career ==
Valdez worked as a consultant at the World Bank in Washington, D.C., and the Regional Office of the Food and Agriculture Organization (FAO), where he contributed to the Institutional Reforms in the Rural Sector, Non-Agricultural Rural Jobs, Policies to Combat Poverty, and Land Regularization.

On his return to Nuevo León in 2003, Valdez joined the Delegation of the Secretariat of Social Development as the State Coordinator of Microregions. He joined the state administration in the position of Director of the General Unit of Planning, Evaluation and Rural development for the agricultural development corporation of Nuevo León. In November 2004, he was appointed Director General of the Trust for the Development of South Nuevo León (FIDESUR) by the Governor, Lic. Natividad Gonzalez Paras. Valdez then went to live with his family in Galeana.

In October 2009, Valdez was appointed Director General of the Corporation for Agricultural Development of Nuevo León by Governor, Lic. Rodrigo Medina de la Cruz. On February 6, 2012, he resigned his position and ran for the Federal Council of the IX District of Nuevo León, winning the 1 July election by a wide margin. In September 2012, he was sworn in as Federal Deputy CNCista by the IX District of Nuevo León.

Valdez is part of the LXII Legislature of the Chamber of Deputies, which has been recognized as one of the most productive legislatures in the history of Mexico. They have advanced the country's welfare in areas such as education, energy, telecommunications, fiscal, financial, labor, and electoral politics.

He is Chairman of the Study Center for Sustainable Rural Development and Agrifood Sobernía (CEDRSSA), Secretary to the Committee on Water and Sanitation, and Secretary of the Commission for Social Development.

As federal deputy, Valdez allocated over $350 million in social projects for municipalities in the state, such as sports units, paving, pipelines, water networks, drainage, sewerage, power agricultural irrigation, electrification, public squares, and more. As a State Officer and Deputy to Federal, he supported the two communes of Cadereyta and Santiago.
