= XHLOS-FM =

Radio Nuevo León station in Montemorelos, Nuevo León, Mexico

- Montemorelos, Nuevo León; Mexico
- Frequency: 97.7 FM
- Branding: Vive FM

Programming
- Format: Public radio/music

Ownership
- Owner: Radio y Televisión de Nuevo León; (Government of the State of Nuevo León)

History
- First air date: 1983
- Call sign meaning: MontemoreLOS

Technical information
- Licensing authority: CRT
- Class: A
- ERP: 3 kW
- HAAT: 17.9 m
- Transmitter coordinates: 26°05′24″N 99°36′52″W

Links
- Webcast: Listen live
- Website: srtvnl.com

XHLOS-FM (97.7 FM) is a radio station in Montemorelos, Nuevo León, Mexico known as Vive FM. XHLOS is part of the Nuevo León state-owned Radio Nuevo León public network.
