= XHNAR-FM =

Radio Nuevo León station in Linares, Nuevo León

- Linares, Nuevo León; Mexico
- Frequency: 103.3 FM
- Branding: Vive FM

Programming
- Format: Public radio/music

Ownership
- Owner: Radio y Televisión de Nuevo León; (Government of the State of Nuevo León)

History
- First air date: 1983
- Call sign meaning: LiNARes

Technical information
- Licensing authority: CRT
- Class: B
- ERP: 50 kW
- HAAT: 78.32 m
- Transmitter coordinates: 24°51′33″N 99°34′04″W

Links
- Website: srtvnl.com/vive-fm/

XHNAR-FM (103.3 FM) is a radio station in Linares, Nuevo León, Mexico, known as Vive FM. XHNAR is part of the Nuevo León state-owned Radio Nuevo León public network.
