= Rayones =

Municipality in Mexico

Coordinates: 25°01′N 100°05′W

- Municipality
- Location in Mexico Rayones (Mexico)
- Country: Mexico
- State: Nuevo León

Government
  - Federal electoral district: Nuevo León's 9th
- Demonym: (in Spanish)
- Time zone: UTC−6 (Zona Centro)

Rayones is a municipality in the Mexican state of Nuevo León. It is named after the Rayón brothers, who were insurgent heroes of the country's independence achieved in 1821. The town was founded in 1852.

It is a small village consisting of fourteen streets, lying in the middle of the Sierra Madre Oriental mountain range, in the northeast of Mexico. In the area near Rayones are the municipalities of Galeana (due south), Santiago (due north), and the state of Coahuila, due west. Rayones marks the beginning of the Zona Ixtlera, the southernmost region of the state of Nuevo León.

Access to Rayones is difficult. The main highway, coming from Montemorelos, is a challenge for most drivers. The unpaved highway coming from Galeana is even more risky, as it is a two-way road where only one vehicle fits; it is rocky, lined by a dangerous cliff and has no guard rail.

Rayones is a tourist destination for offroad enthusiasts who travel long distances from the state's capital, Monterrey, crossing the Pilón river, the town's primary water source. The municipality has some landmarks such as La Cebolla (the Onion), a hilltop with a scenic overview.

Extensive pecan tree plantations in the region bring prosperity to Rayones; pecans being the main product commercialized by locals. The traditional 'Feria de la Nuez' or Pecan Fair is held annually as a tourist attraction and a merchant exchange, with traditional dances and exhibitions also offered.

As of 2020, the location had a population of 2,377 people.
