= XHARR-FM =

Radio Nuevo León station in Doctor Arroyo, Nuevo León

- Doctor Arroyo, Nuevo León; Mexico
- Frequency: 96.5 FM
- Branding: Vive FM

Programming
- Format: Public radio/music

Ownership
- Owner: Radio y Televisión de Nuevo León; (Government of the State of Nuevo León)

History
- First air date: 1989
- Call sign meaning: Doctor ARRoyo

Technical information
- Licensing authority: CRT
- Class: B1
- ERP: 25 kW
- HAAT: −178.8 m (−587 ft)
- Transmitter coordinates: 23°40′26″N 100°10′45″W

Links
- Website: srtvnl.com/vive-fm/

XHARR-FM (96.5 FM) is a radio station in Doctor Arroyo, Nuevo León, Mexico, known as Vive FM. XHARR is part of the Nuevo León state-owned Radio Nuevo León public network.
