= Héctor Humberto Gutiérrez =

Mexican politician

- Born: 2 November 1962 (age 63); Monterrey, Nuevo León, Mexico
- Occupation: Politician
- Political party: PRI

Héctor Humberto Gutiérrez de la Garza (born 2 November 1962) is a Mexican politician affiliated with the Institutional Revolutionary Party (PRI). He has been elected to the Chamber of Deputies on two occasions: in the 2003 mid-terms (59th Congress), as a plurinominal deputy; and in the 2012 general election (62nd Congress), for Nuevo León's 5th district.
