= XHQI-FM =

Radio station in Monterrey, Nuevo León, Mexico

- Monterrey, Nuevo León; Mexico
- Frequency: 102.1 FM
- Branding: Opus 102.1 FM

Programming
- Format: Classical music

Ownership
- Owner: Radio y Televisión de Nuevo León; (Government of the State of Nuevo León)
- Sister stations: XHCPFP-FM

History
- First air date: 1978

Technical information
- Licensing authority: CRT
- Class: C1
- ERP: 99.63 kW
- HAAT: 222.9 meters (731 ft)
- Transmitter coordinates: 25°37′34″N 100°19′11″W

Links
- Webcast: Listen live
- Website: srtvnl.com

XHQI-FM is a station in Monterrey, Nuevo León, Mexico. Owned by the state government of Nuevo León, XHQI broadcasts on 102.1 FM from a transmitter site on Cerro El Mirador and carries a public radio format known as Radio Nuevo León 102.1 FM.

== History ==
XHQI was the first state-owned broadcast station in Nuevo León, coming to air in 1978 as "Radio Gobierno". XEQI-AM followed the next year, and services in rural Nuevo León were opened in the 1980s.

For most of its history, it was Opus 102 with a classical music format. The July 2017 decision to move Opus to 1510 AM and launch a new station, Libertad 102, focused around popular music met with criticism in the cultural community.
