= Santiago González Soto =

Mexican politician, born 1961

Federal deputy for Nuevo León's 5th district
- Incumbent
- Assumed office 1 September 2024

Federal deputy for Nuevo León's 5th district
- In office 2018–2021

Personal details
- Born: 25 June 1961 (age 64) Mexquitic de Carmona, San Luis Potosí, Mexico
- Party: PT
- Occupation: Journalist, lawyer, politician

Santiago González Soto (Note: In this Spanish name, the first or paternal surname is González and the second or maternal family name is Soto.) (born 25 June 1961) is a Mexican journalist, lawyer and politician. A member of the Labour Party (PT), he has been elected twice to the Chamber of Deputies.

== Biography ==
González Soto was born in Mexquitic de Carmona, San Luis Potosí, in 1961. He holds bachelor's degrees in communication science (1985) and law (2014) and a master's in communication science (2006).

As a journalist he has worked extensively in the state of Nuevo León, including periods spent with Televisión de Nuevo León, Diario de Monterrey, Multimedios Televisión, Televisa Monterrey and Radio Nuevo León.

As a member of the PT, he was elected to the Congress of Nuevo León for the 2000–2003 legislative session. In the 2003 state election, he contended for the governorship of Nuevo León on the PT ticket but came in a distant third place with 4.99% of the vote. (Note: The election was won by José Natividad González Parás of the PRI.)

In the 2018 general election he stood for an alliance of the PT, the National Regeneration Movement (Morena) and the Social Encounter Party (PES) in Nuevo León's 5th congressional district (Monterrey); he won with 32.5% of the votes cast and represented the district during the 64th Congress.

He fought for re-election in the 2021 mid-terms but lost to Marcela Guerra Castillo of the Institutional Revolutionary Party (PRI). He was successful on his second bid for re-election, in the 2024 general election, and was duly elected to represent the district in the 66th Congress.
