= Molodaya Gvardiya (magazine) =

- Editor-in-Chief: Valerij Khatushin (Валерий Хатюшин)
- Frequency: Monthly
- Founder: Komsomol
- Founded: 1922
- Country: USSR → Russia
- Based in: Moscow
- Language: Russian language
- ISSN: 0131-2251
- OCLC: 179990148

Molodaya Gvardiya (Russian: Молодая гвардия, "Young Guard") is a monthly Russian magazine focusing on literature and politics, founded in Moscow in May 1922 as an organ of the Central Committee of the Komsomol.

It had an immediate success with Alexander Tarasov-Rodionov's short novel Shokolad (Chocolate), a controversial work in which the author "faced without blinking the truth about 'revolutionary justice' as meted out by the organs of state security, and with knowledge gained at first hand he revealed the methods used by the Cheka to maintain the Bolsheviks in power"; the "chocolate" of the title stands for luxuries enjoyed "in the midst of proletarian starvation." It was not published from 1942 to 1947 due to the hardships of the second world war. Between 1947 and 1956 it was published as a periodical anthology for young writers. It became increasingly conservative and nationalist over the years, publishing strongly nativist and sometimes xenophobic material during the Khrushchev Thaw (although in 1964 it also published Andrey Voznesensky's long poem "Oza," which was "a favorite among Soviet scientists and other intellectuals," as well as the results of the first Soviet public opinion survey, in which young people complained about their sexual ignorance).

In 1970 the activities of Molodaya Gvardiya were examined at a session of the Politburo. The magazine was perceived by Party authorities as excessively "russophilic." A decision was taken to remove the editor, Anatolii Nikonov, from his post. This crackdown marked the start of a new campaign against Russian nationalists by Soviet regime. Anatoly Ivanov succeeded Anatolii Nikonov in the post.

In the 1980s the magazine opposed perestroika.

It was awarded the Order of the Red Banner of Labour in 1972.
