= XHSAB-FM =

Radio station in Sabinas Hidalgo, Nuevo León

- Sabinas Hidalgo, Nuevo León; Mexico
- Frequencies: 89.5 FM; 97.7 FM (Bustamante)
- Branding: Vive FM

Programming
- Format: Public radio/music

Ownership
- Owner: Radio y Televisión de Nuevo León; (Government of the State of Nuevo León)

History
- First air date: 1983
- Call sign meaning: SABinas Hidalgo

Technical information
- Licensing authority: CRT
- Class: A
- ERP: 3 kW
- HAAT: 8 m
- Transmitter coordinates: 26°29′55″N 100°10′45″W

Links
- Website: srtvnl.com/vive-fm/

XHSAB-FM (89.5 FM) is a radio station in Sabinas Hidalgo, Nuevo León, known as Vive FM. XHSAB is part of the Nuevo León state-owned Radio Nuevo León public network.

XHSAB is relayed on 97.7 FM in Bustamante, Nuevo León. This station was licensed in 2003 with the callsign XHBUS, but its permit expired in 2010, even though said station is still operating. There is a 97.7 FM in Sabinas Hidalgo, XHESH-FM, that is unrelated to the state government.
