= Sofía Segovia =

Mexican writer (born 1965)

- Born: 1965 (age 60–61); Monterrey, Mexico
- Citizenship: Mexico
- Occupation: Author
- Writing career
- Language: Spanish

Sofía Segovia (born 1965) is a Mexican writer. She is best known for her 2015 novel, The Murmur of Bees, which has been translated into 22 languages. Segovia studied communications and wrote her first novel, Hurricane Night, in the early 2000s, but was unable to find a publisher until 2010. A native of northern Mexico, Segovia emphasizes the importance of regional and underrepresented perspectives in her writing.

== Early life ==
Segovia was born in Monterrey, Nuevo León, in 1965. She has said that it was difficult to be an aspiring writer in her part of northern Mexico. When she submitted her first manuscripts, she considered her association with Monterrey a greater obstacle to publication than her gender. She graduated from the University of Monterrey with a degree in communications in 1989.

Segovia recalled hearing stories of her grandfather's life in Linares, an agricultural town in Nuevo León. These stories provided the "color, flavor, sound, and dimension" of her future novel, El murmullo de las abejas (The Murmur of Bees). She was unable to visit Linares due to cartel violence, and only later in her career did she publish a novel set there.

She has worked as a political speechwriter, ghostwriter, and image consultant. She also wrote scripts, including for local amateur theater. Her training as a communications professional informed her later interest in studying the mechanics of propaganda through fiction.

== Literary career ==
In 2000, Segovia saw an advertisement for a writing workshop in the newspaper El Norte. She composed Noche de huracán (Hurricane Night) from around 2001 to 2003, but was unable to find a publisher until the Council for Culture and the Arts of Nuevo León (Conarte) expressed interest in local authors in 2010. The book follows the life of Aniceto Mora on the Mexican island of Cozumel, where the effects of two hurricanes shape his relationship with his son, Manuel. She used her experience as a visitor to the island and anecdotes she had been told, needing less research than for her later novels.

She hoped to "better explain" Mexico from a northern Mexican perspective with her novel, emphasizing the importance of regional storytelling. However, she has acknowledged that the violence in the book would not have been as well received if it had been published sooner. In 2016, she reworked the text and published it through Lumen as simply Huracán (Hurricane), wanting to update its treatment of racism and violence against women and children.

The Murmur of Bees was first released in 2015. It went on to sell 1.5 million copies and was translated into 22 languages, including an English translation by Simon Bruni published in 2019. Set during the Mexican Revolution, it focuses on a boy with a cleft lip and mysterious powers. She named the protagonist "Simonopio" based on her grandfather's story about curing a child named Simón of pneumonia using a mustard plaster. The book's style of magical realism has been compared to that of Isabel Allende.

Segovia had already started work on Peregrinos (Pilgrims) in 2014. The unexpected success of The Murmur of Bees delayed its publication, and she spent up to sixteen hours a day completing it. It tells the story of Prussian refugees after World War II, based on the lives of Arno Schipper and Ilse Hahlbrock, immigrants to Mexico whose children she had known for 38 years. Arno was already deceased by the time of publication and Segovia relied on archival interviews. It had been translated into six languages by 2023. In an interview with Publishers Weekly, Segovia called it "a homage to Prussia and every other land that 'disappeared'".

She published her first nonfiction book, De lector a escritor (From Reader to Writer), in 2025, aiming to provide advice and encouragement for aspiring writers. She has said that she was hesitant to try writing professionally and did not begin her first novel until she was 35. As of 2025, Segovia had declined offers to adapt The Murmur of Bees into a movie, focusing instead on audiobook adaptations.

== Themes and style ==
Segovia identifies theater and cinema as major influences on her narrative approach, describing scripts and novels as distinct yet equally effective forms of storytelling. She sees her role as a novelist rather than a historian, which allows her to adjust chronology when it serves the narrative's internal logic. Her use of flashbacks and flash-forwards focuses on character psychology over linear progression. Although her work is often categorized as magical realism, Segovia attributes the "magic" in her prose to the mysteries of the environment and her Latin American heritage.

Regional representation is a significant element of Segovia's fiction. She has said that Linares, the setting for The Murmur of Bees, is as worthy of a novel as Paris in the works of Victor Hugo or rural Russia in those of Leo Tolstoy. Segovia distinguishes her depiction of Linares from Gabriel García Márquez's Macondo because her setting corresponds to a real location. Sarah Anderson interprets this regionalism as a focus on marginalized figures such as landless farmers, Indigenous wet nurses, and refugees, who are often excluded from national narratives. Anderson argues that Segovia's fiction has contributed to the preservation of regional cultural identity.

Paulo Alvarado argues that Segovia's novels critique the industrial culture of northern Mexico, which historically prioritized labor to the point of human alienation. She counters this through characters who embody leisure and a sense of "amazement" (asombro), fostering a deeper connection with nature. Segovia says that by exploring her characters' private lives and communal values, she can capture a "murmur" frequently drowned out by the distractions of modern life. In her view, modern life pulls people away from their instincts, and her historical fiction aims to help readers recover echoes of their own past.

== Personal life ==
Segovia lives with her husband in Monterrey, where she has a studio to conduct her writing. They have three children.

== Works ==
=== Fiction ===
- Noches de huracán (2009; reissued as Huracán, 2016) (Note: An ISBN dated to 2009 exists for the work. The author has spoken of it being published in 2010.)
- El murmullo de las abejas (2015; published in English as The Murmur of Bees, 2019)
- Peregrinos (2019)
- Monterrey 24 (anthology, edited by Luis Felipe Lomelí, 2019)

=== Nonfiction ===
- De lector a escritor (2025)

== Bibliography ==
- Anderson, Sarah (2020). "Local Culture and Historical Fiction in the Era of Globalization: Sofía Segovia's El murmullo de las abejas". A Contracorriente: Revista de Historia Social y Literatura en América Latina. 17 (2): 217–228. ISSN 1548-7083.
- Alvarado, Paulo (2019). "El murmullo de las abejas de Sofía Segovia" [The murmur of the bees of Sofia Segovia]. Revista de Humanidades (in Spanish) (39): 189–212. ISSN 0717-0491.
- Bautista Verduzco, Salma Valeria (5 September 2024). "El viaje de Simonopio: un análisis cinematográfico de El murmullo de las abejas de Sofía Segovia" [Simonopio's Journey a cinematographic analysis of El murmullo de las abejas by Sofía Segovia]. Interpretextos revista semestral de creación y divulgación de las humanidades (Colima) (in Spanish). 1 (2): 69–82. doi:10.53897/RevInterp.2024.02.05.
