= Iturbide, Nuevo León =

Iturbide
- Municipality
- Church of San Pedro Apóstol, Iturbide

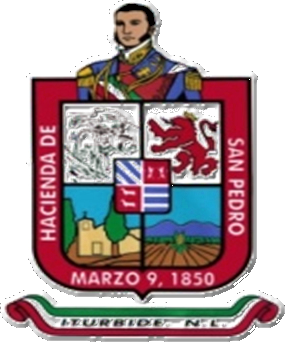
- Coat of arms

- Location within Nuevo León Location within Mexico
- Coordinates: 24°43′31″N 99°54′00″W
- Country: Mexico
- State: Nuevo León

Government
  - Type: Municipality
  - Mayor: Arnoldo Carreón Rodríguez (MC)
  - Federal electoral district: Nuevo León's 9th

Area
  - Total: 719.2 km^{2} (277.7 sq mi)

Population (2020 census)
  - Total: 3,298 (municipality)
  - Density: 4.586/km^{2} (11.88/sq mi)
- Time zone: UTC-6 (Zona Centro)
- Website: iturbide.gob.mx

Iturbide is a municipality of Mexico, located in Nuevo León. It has an area of 719.2 square kilometers. It is named in honor of Agustín de Iturbide. It is bordered by the municipality of Galeana on the north and west. Aramberri borders it to the south, and both Linares and Tamaulipas border it to the east. Its main economic activities are agriculture and tourism. The nearby municipal government center is San Pedro de Iturbide.

Iturbide is near the crash site of the 2012 Mexico Learjet 25 crash.
