= Aramberri, Nuevo León =

Arramberri, Nuevo León Santa María de los Angeles de Río Blanco
- Municipality
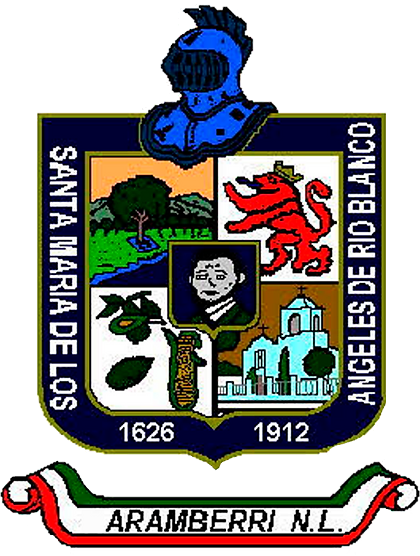
- Coat of arms

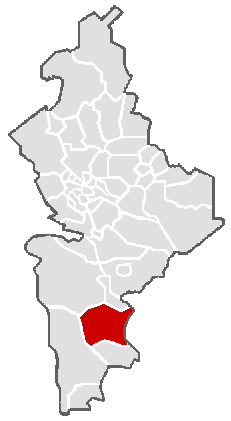
- Coordinates: 24°06′N 99°49′W
- Country: Mexico
- State: Nuevo León
- Founded: 1626
- Named for: José Silvestre Aramberri

Government
  - Type: Municipality
  - Mayor: Martín Castillo (MC)
  - Federal electoral district: Nuevo León's 9th

Area
  - Total: 2,809 km^{2} (1,085 sq mi)

Population (2020 census)
  - Total: 14,992
- Time zone: UTC-6 (Zona Centro)
- Website: Aramberri

Aramberri is a municipality in the northeastern Mexican state of Nuevo León. It is located at southeastern corner of the state. It was founded as Santa María de los Angeles de Río Blanco Mission in 1626 in the jurisdiction of Río Blanco, in the former New Kingdom of León. Its current name (which means "new valley" in Basque) honors José Silvestre Aramberri, a general known for his involvement in the Reform War. It borders the municipalities of Galeana and Iturbide to north, Doctor Arroyo to west and southwest, General Zaragoza to south and with state of Tamaulipas to east.

== History ==
The first Spanish settlement in the area took place in 1626, when friar Lorenzo Cantú, established a mission in which is now the municipal seat of Aramberri, in order to evangelize and pacificate the nomadic tribes of Native Americans called Negritos or Bozalos and Janambres, which inhabited until its extinction in what is now Southern Nuevo León and Southeastern Tamaulipas. However, the mission, did not have success until the definitive foundation of Santa María de los Angeles Mission by Juan Ruíz Colmenero and several families of Spanish settlers in the year of 1648 in the region of Río Blanco valley, It was the southernmost administrative division of the New Kingdom of León, which comprised also, the present-day municipalities of Doctor Arroyo, Galeana, General Zaragoza, and Mier y Noriega in Nuevo León and the Mission of San Antonio de los Llanos, now Hidalgo, Tamaulipas. Santa María de los Angeles remained almost unpopulated during much of its history. It was created as municipality, separated from Río Blanco valley and renamed as Aramberri in 1877.

A kindergarten in El Yerbaniz, Aramberri, home to thirty families, won MXN $20 million in the September 15, 2020 raffle of the presidential airplane.

== Economy ==
The economy of Aramberri is mostly based in agriculture, the production and export of vegetables and fruits. Although, the southernmost part of Nuevo León has a lower per capita income compared to other regions of the state of Nuevo León, Aramberri has a per capita income higher than its adjacent municipalities in the southern part of the state. In 2008, with an investment of 150 million of pesos, was opened a techno-horticultural park in the community of Sandia, Aramberri, it is one of the biggest agro-industrial parks of the state of Nuevo León, the project was supported by the government of Nuevo León, several entrepreneurs from Monterrey and southern Nuevo León, and important educative institutions such as the Universidad Autónoma de Nuevo León and Monterrey Institute of Technology, the park, comprises as for 2009, more than 80 greenhouses within a range of 2,570 m^{2}, it was recently announced the creation of 25 greenhouses for late 2009 and early months of 2010. In its first semester of operation in just 40 greenhouses of its total of 80 which were built in late 2008 and early 2009, it had 3, 500 gross tons of production of vegetals primarily different varieties of tomato, approximately an average of 70 tons per greenhouse, the production is estimated to increase by 20% for each greenhouse in 2009 and there are plans of expansion and creation of more agro-industrial parks in the zone.

== Paleontology ==
In 2002, Aramberri, attracted national and international media attention when it was announced the discovery of a large Pliosaur fossil, often referred by the press as "the Aramberri Monster", as they believed it looks like the Loch Ness Monster. The specimen is actually a very large pliosaur, possibly reaching 15 m (50 ft) in length. The media published exaggerated reports claiming it was 25 m (80 ft) long, and weighed up to 150,000 kg, which would have made it the largest predator of all time. This error was dramatically perpetuated in BBC's documentary series Walking with Dinosaurs, which also prematurely classified it as a Liopleurodon ferox. On January 7, 2003, the fossil was transferred and reconstructed at the Natural History Museum of Karlsruhe in Germany, and was kept in exhibition until 2003, when it was transferred to the Museo del Desierto in Saltillo, Coahuila. The fossil is on exhibition at the Museo de historia Mexicana in Monterrey.

== Climate ==
Climate data for Aramberri, Nuevo León (1991–2020 normals, extremes 1970–present)
Month	Jan	Feb	Mar	Apr	May	Jun	Jul	Aug	Sep	Oct	Nov	Dec	Year
Record high °C (°F)	38.5 (101.3)	41.5 (106.7)	41 (106)	43 (109)	44 (111)	43 (109)	39.5 (103.1)	40.5 (104.9)	40 (104)	40 (104)	38.5 (101.3)	37 (99)	44 (111)
Mean daily maximum °C (°F)	25.1 (77.2)	27.6 (81.7)	30.0 (86.0)	32.2 (90.0)	32.5 (90.5)	32.2 (90.0)	32.0 (89.6)	32.6 (90.7)	30.1 (86.2)	29.2 (84.6)	26.7 (80.1)	25.5 (77.9)	29.6 (85.3)
Daily mean °C (°F)	15.6 (60.1)	17.6 (63.7)	20.2 (68.4)	22.8 (73.0)	24.1 (75.4)	24.7 (76.5)	24.5 (76.1)	24.8 (76.6)	23.1 (73.6)	21.1 (70.0)	18.0 (64.4)	16.0 (60.8)	21.0 (69.8)
Mean daily minimum °C (°F)	6.0 (42.8)	7.6 (45.7)	10.4 (50.7)	13.4 (56.1)	15.6 (60.1)	17.2 (63.0)	17.1 (62.8)	17.1 (62.8)	16.2 (61.2)	13.1 (55.6)	9.3 (48.7)	6.5 (43.7)	12.5 (54.5)
Record low °C (°F)	−6 (21)	−5.5 (22.1)	−3 (27)	0 (32)	6 (43)	8 (46)	9.5 (49.1)	10 (50)	6 (43)	1 (34)	−2 (28)	−9 (16)	−9 (16)
Average precipitation mm (inches)	16.2 (0.64)	11.0 (0.43)	19.6 (0.77)	29.8 (1.17)	46.2 (1.82)	62.5 (2.46)	58.3 (2.30)	49.5 (1.95)	127.6 (5.02)	54.8 (2.16)	17.4 (0.69)	13.3 (0.52)	506.2 (19.93)
Average precipitation days	4.1	2.7	3.8	4.8	7.7	7.7	7.4	7.0	10.9	7.2	4.2	3.1	70.6
Source: Servicio Meteorológico Nacional
