= Adrián Villagómez García =

Mexican politician

- Born: 2 January 1952; Monterrey, Nuevo León, Mexico
- Died: 6 February 2013 (aged 61)
- Occupation: Politician
- Political party: PRI

Adrián Villagómez García (2 January 1952 – 6 February 2013) was a Mexican politician affiliated with the Institutional Revolutionary Party (PRI). In the 2003 mid-terms he was elected to the Chamber of Deputies to represent Nuevo León's 9th district during the 59th session of Congress.

Villagómez García died in February 2013.
