= XEQI-AM =

Radio station in Monterrey, Nuevo León, Mexico

Defunct
- Escobedo-Monterrey, Nuevo León; Mexico
- Frequency: 1510 AM
- Branding: Radio Nuevo León

Programming
- Format: Public radio

Ownership
- Owner: Radio y Televisión de Nuevo León; (Gobierno del Estado de Nuevo León)
- Sister stations: XHQI-FM

History
- First air date: 1979
- Last air date: January 10, 2025
- Call sign meaning: Chosen to match XHQI-FM

Technical information
- Class: B
- Power: 10,000 watts (daytime only)
- Transmitter coordinates: 25°49′4.54″N 100°15′38.5″W

XEQI-AM was a radio station on 1510 AM in Monterrey, Nuevo León, Mexico, which broadcast from 1979 to 2025. It was owned by the state government of Nuevo León and last known as Radio Nuevo León.

1510 AM is a United States clear-channel frequency.

== History ==
Logo as La Radio Alternativa, used until 2017

XEQI opened in 1979, a year after XHQI-FM Radio Gobierno signed on. It became Opus after the format was moved from 102.1 FM on July 31, 2017, replacing "La Radio Alternativa". The Opus format was later moved back to FM. The state government surrendered the concession in a letter dated January 10, 2025.

XEQI was nominally a daytime-only station but broadcast from 6 a.m. to midnight.
