= Military chocolate =

Military chocolate may refer to:

- Military chocolate (Switzerland)
- Military chocolate (United States)

== See also ==
- Chocolate (disambiguation)
