= XHAHU-FM =

Radio station in Ciudad Anáhuac, Nuevo León

- Anáhuac, Nuevo León; Mexico
- Broadcast area: Anáhuac, Nuevo León; Nuevo Laredo, Tamaulipas; Laredo, Texas
- Frequency: 103.3 FM
- Branding: Vive FM

Programming
- Format: Public radio

Ownership
- Owner: Radio y Televisión de Nuevo León; (Government of the State of Nuevo León)

History
- First air date: 1989
- Call sign meaning: XH AnáHUac

Technical information
- Licensing authority: CRT
- Class: B1
- ERP: 25,000 watts
- HAAT: 38.2 metres (125 ft)
- Transmitter coordinates: 27°14′37.2″N 100°07′50.8″W

Links
- Website: srtvnl.com/vive-fm/

XHAHU-FM (103.3 FM, "Vive FM") is a radio station in Ciudad Anáhuac, Nuevo León. XHAHU is part of the Nuevo León state-owned Radio Nuevo León public network.
