= Fermín Montes Cavazos =

Mexican politician (born 1948)

- Born: 28 February 1948 (age 78); General Terán, Nuevo León, Mexico
- Education: Autonomous University of Nuevo León; New Mexico State University
- Occupation: Politician
- Political party: PRI

Fermín Montes Cavazos (born 28 February 1948) is a Mexican politician from the Institutional Revolutionary Party (PRI). In the 2009 mid-terms he was elected to the Chamber of Deputies to represent Nuevo León's 9th district during the 61st session of Congress.

Montes Cavazos earned his licentiate in agricultural engineering from the Autonomous University of Nuevo León (UANL) in 1970 and his master's in horticulture from New Mexico State University in 1981. He taught at UANL for over three decades and was the director of the Faculty of Agronomy.
