= XHCER-FM =

Radio Nuevo León station in Cerralvo, Nuevo León

- Cerralvo, Nuevo León; Mexico
- Frequency: 100.7 FM
- Branding: Vive FM

Programming
- Format: Public radio/music

Ownership
- Owner: Radio y Televisión de Nuevo León; (Government of the State of Nuevo León)

History
- First air date: 1983
- Call sign meaning: CERralvo

Technical information
- Licensing authority: CRT
- Class: B1
- ERP: 15 kW
- HAAT: 7.2 m (24 ft)
- Transmitter coordinates: 26°05′24″N 99°36′52″W

Links
- Website: srtvnl.com/vive-fm/

XHCER-FM (100.7 FM) is a radio station in Cerralvo, Nuevo León, known as Vive FM. XHCER is part of the Nuevo León state-owned Radio Nuevo León public network.
