= Ramos River =

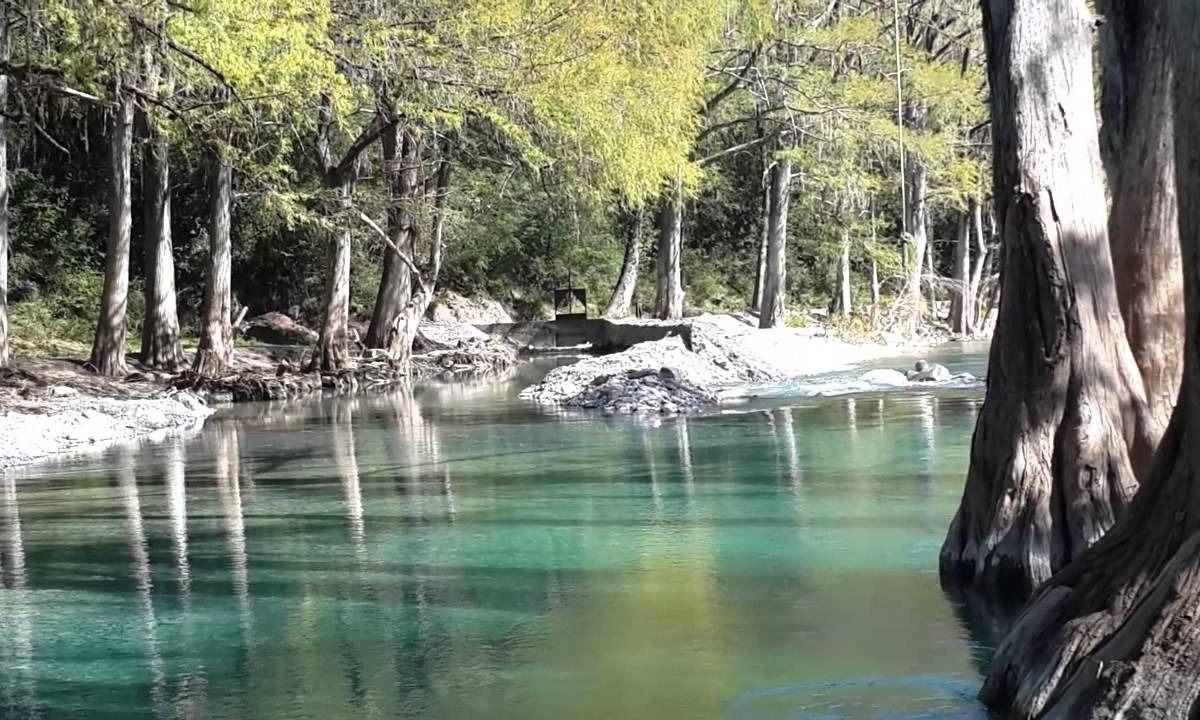

Location
- Country: Mexico

Physical characteristics
- Source
  - location: Allende, Nuevo León

The Ramos River is located in the municipality of Allende, Nuevo León. It begins in the Sierra Madre Oriental and is an important part of the Cumbres de Monterrey National Park.

== Description ==
This river flows into the San Juan River, which in turn also flows into the Rio Grande. It is approximately 80 kilometers long. It is very important for the agricultural benefits it provides and for hydropower. Its watercourse runs through the municipalities of Montemorelos, Rayones, Linares, and Hualahuises.

It has suffered from pollution problems in the past due to human activities generating wastewater and the overuse of intensive agriculture in the area. For this reason, some preventive measures will be implemented to improve water quality. The temperature of this river ranges between 12 and 20°C, depending on the time of year.

The Ramos River has been the site of major events in the past, which have contributed to the communities living in this area through transportation, fishing, and crop irrigation.

In this natural setting we can find various attractions to promote tourism (forming canyons, waterfalls, etc.; such as: the Cola de Caballo, Presa de la Bocá, the Estanzuela Ecological Park and the bat cave), water activities (fishing, rafting and kayaking) and architectural sites (Hacienda de San Francisco de Vivero).
