= El Chocolate, Nuevo León =

Coordinates: 24°57′11″N 099°43′03″W

Chocolate (or El Chocolate) is a populated place in the municipality of Linares, Nuevo León, Mexico.
