= Gustavo Caballero Camargo =

Mexican politician (born 1948)

- Born: 24 July 1948 (age 77); Nuevo León, Mexico
- Occupation: Politician
- Political party: PRI

Gustavo Caballero Camargo (born 24 July 1948) is a Mexican politician affiliated with the Institutional Revolutionary Party. As of 2014 he served as Deputy of the LX Legislature of the Mexican Congress representing Nuevo León.
