= Linares Municipality, Nuevo León =

Mexican municipality

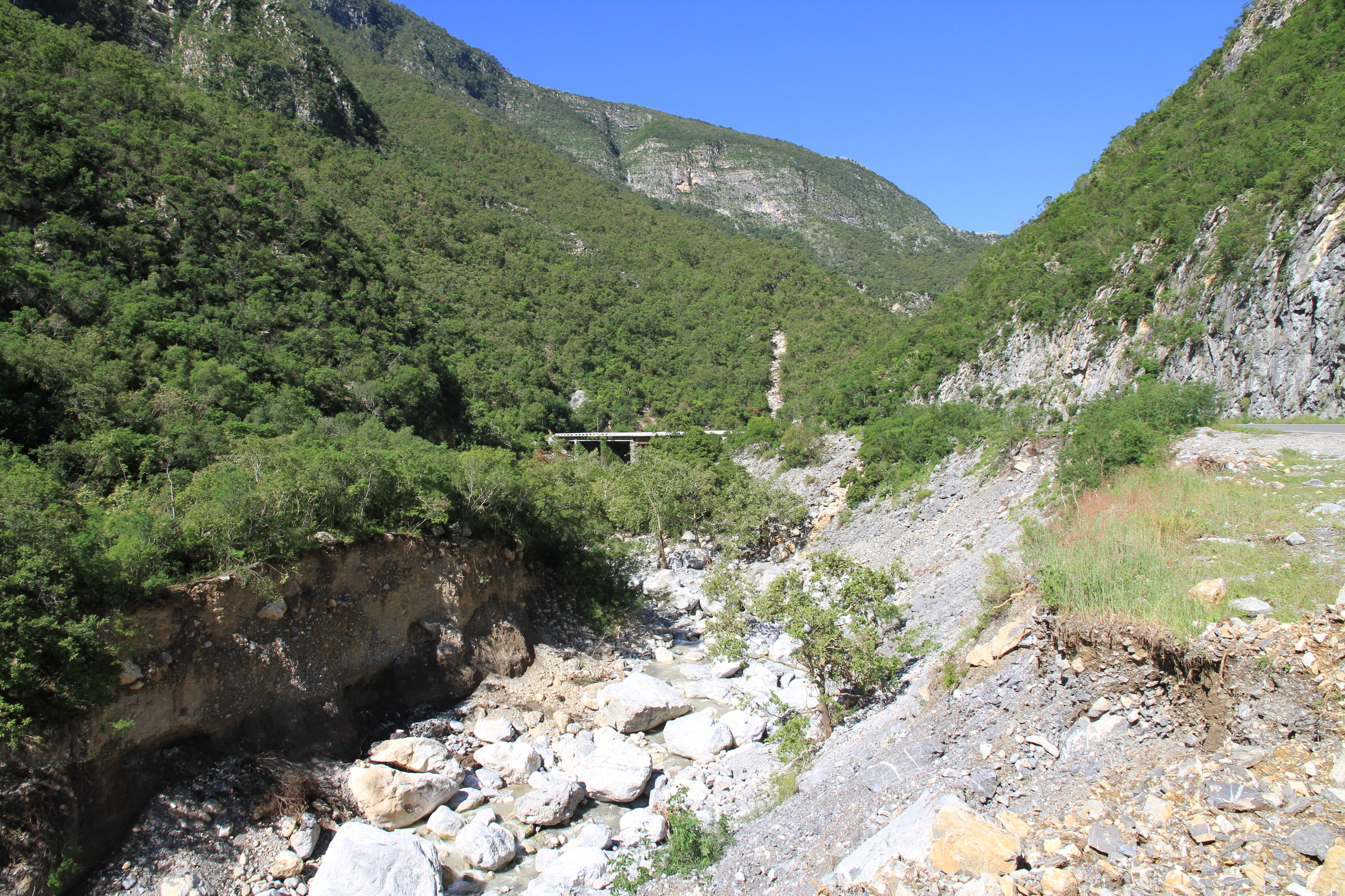

Linares is a municipality in the state of Nuevo Leon, Mexico. The city of the same name serves as the administrative centre of the municipality.

== Geography ==
It is found in the central part of the state, in the Región Citrícula or the Citrus Region.

=== Localities ===
- El Chocolate

== History ==
The town was founded in the "Hualahuises" land on April 10, 1712. The name (Linares) derives from its previous name, Villa de San Felipe de Linares.

== Demographics ==
According to the Population and Housing Census done by the Instituto Nacional de Estadistica y Geografía (INEGI), the municipality has a total population of 78,669. Of the total population, 39,104 (49%) are men and 39,565 (51%) are women.

== Culture ==
Linares is the first cultural center outside of the metropolitan area of Monterrey. Linares has a theater house with a capacity of 600, a central library and two exhibition galleries where works from national and international artists are on display.

Six public libraries, eighteen cultural halls are present, along with three cultural halls in the more rural areas.

The city has a Culture House presenting free music, dance, theater, literature, and visual arts classes. Music includes rounds, choirs and folklore ballet in addition to popular music.

The city hosts multiple festivals. These include two music festivals (in October and Holy Week), the plastic arts festival in November, and the Villaseca fair in August.

Linares is recognized for its caramel-like candies made from cow's and goat's milk. The most famous brand is "Glorias de Linares.

It was recently named Pueblo Mágico (Magical Town).
