= Mier y Noriega =

- Municipality
- Location within Nuevo León Location within Mexico
- Coordinates: 23°25′20″N 100°07′01″W
- Country: Mexico
- State: Nuevo León
- Established: 1849
- Named for: Servando Teresa de Mier

Government
  - Municipal President: Pedro Cortéz Briones (PRI)
  - Federal electoral district: Nuevo León's 9th

Area
  - Total: 1,006.78 km^{2} (388.72 sq mi)
- Elevation: 1,669 m (5,476 ft)

Population (2010)
  - Total: 7,095
  - Density: 7.047/km^{2} (18.25/sq mi)
- Data source: INEGI
- Time zone: UTC-6 (Zona Centro)
- Postal code: 67980

Mier y Noriega is a municipality situated in the far southern region of the Mexican state of Nuevo León.

It borders the municipality of Doctor Arroyo to the north, the only municipality it borders in Nuevo León; the municipality also borders San Luis Potosí and Tamaulipas.

== Population ==
The municipality has 7,095 inhabitants, of which 1,214 live in the town of Mier y Noriega, the seat of the municipality. Other settlements with more than 500 residents include La Cardona, Cerros Blancos, Las Palomas, and Tapona Morena.

== History ==
The municipality was founded in 1849 and is named for Servando Teresa de Mier Noriega y Guerra, a Monterrey native who helped draft the Mexican Constitution of 1824. The first colonial settlement took place at the end of the 19th century by agave farmers, though there had been previous indigenous settlement.
