= Alexander Tarasov-Rodionov =

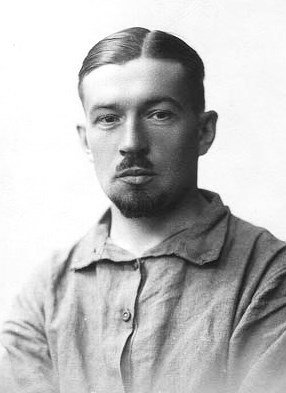
- Born: October 7, 1885; Astrakhan, Russian Empire
- Died: September 3, 1938 (aged 52); Kommunarka shooting ground, Moscow Oblast, Soviet Union
- Writing career
- Notable work: Chocolate

Alexander Ignatyevich Tarasov-Rodionov (Russian: Алекса́ндр Игна́тьевич Тара́сов-Родио́нов; October 7, 1885 – September 3, 1938) was a Russian/Soviet writer and revolutionary, best known for his novel Chocolate which at the time of publication was acclaimed as a tale of heroic self-sacrifice but has since been criticized as a justification for the Red Terror.

== Biography ==
Tarasov-Rodionov was born in Astrakhan, where his father was a surveyor. He studied law at the University of Kazan and joined the Bolshevik party in 1905, taking an active part in the 1905 Revolution. In 1908, he received his law degree. He was drafted in 1914, and he became a second lieutenant. Later, he participated in the 1917 Revolution and was involved in taking Pyotr Krasnov prisoner during the Kerensky-Krasnov uprising. He also fought with the Red Army during the Civil War. After being demobilized, he worked as a magistrate and was involved in setting up the literary organizations Kuznitsa (The Smithy) and RAPP.

At this time, he also began writing. His works were printed in proletarian magazines such as Oktyabr and Young Guard. His novel Chocolate was published in 1922.

His troubles began in 1931 when, on a business trip to Berlin, he met Vladimir Nabokov and persuaded him to return to Russia for a visit. Nabokov's family had supported the White Army and he was disdainful of what he saw. After that, Tarasov-Rodionov fell out of favor with the communist party and was under suspicion. On 27 April 1938, he was arrested on charges of espionage and Trotskyism. He was sentenced to death the same day and, five months later, was executed at the Kommunarka shooting ground. In 1956, he was rehabilitated.

A number of his other works, including Grass and Blood (1924) and his unfinished autobiographical trilogy Heavy Steps (begun in 1927), were long considered to be ideologically incorrect, along with Chocolate, which was also burned by the Nazis during the extensive Nazi book burnings in 1933.

== "Chocolate" ==
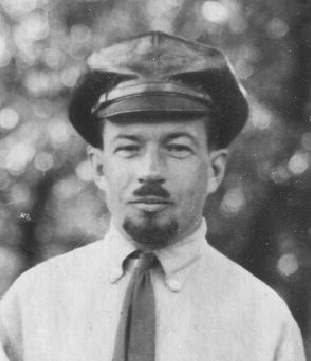

The work was first published in December 1922 in the journal Young Guard. It tells the story of Zudin, a chairman of the local Cheka, who is accidentally implicated in and finally executed for a bribery scandal involving, among other things, some chocolate that his wife accepted as a gift from his secretary. It was reprinted in the USSR five times (1925, 1927, 1928, 1930, 1990), and translated into several languages, including Hungarian, where it was read by young revolutionaries such as Imre Lakatos.

A review, published in the Petrograd "Red Student", was enthusiastic, saying that the death by execution of Zudin, though an unfortunate turn of events since he was innocent, revealed a real pattern: Communists and specifically the Chekists are first and foremost merciless towards themselves.

The main character is purportedly based on the recollections of Felix Dzerzhinsky, as cited in the memoir of V. V. Ovsienko, about the real person D. Y. Chudin, a member of the board of the Petrograd Cheka, shot on August 23, 1919.

== English translations ==
- Chocolate, a novel by Alexander Tarasov-Rodionov;translated from the Russian by Charles Malamuth, Doubleday, Doran & company, inc., 1932.
- Chocolate, from Fifty Years of Russian Prose, M.I.T Press, 1971.

'Chocolate' was dramatized for BBC Radio 4 in 1988 by Peter Thomson, with Ian Hogg as Zudin. Directed by Matthew Walters.

== See also ==
- What Is to Be Done? (novel) — 1863 ideological novel by Nikolai Chernyshevsky
