= Hualahuises =

- Municipality
- Location in Mexico Hualahuises (Mexico)
- Country: Mexico
- State: Nuevo León

Government
  - Federal electoral district: Nuevo León's 9th
- Demonym: (in Spanish)
- Time zone: UTC−6 (Zona Centro)

Hualahuises is a small town in the state of Nuevo León, in northern Mexico. It serves as the administrative seat for the surrounding municipality, with which it shares a name.

The town has many folkloric things that have been preserved over the years. Hualahuises is divided into two parts: Santa Rosa and Hualahuises itself. People living there have a reputation for being very friendly and courteous.

== Locator maps ==
- 24°56′N 99°42′W
