= Montemorelos =

- Municipality
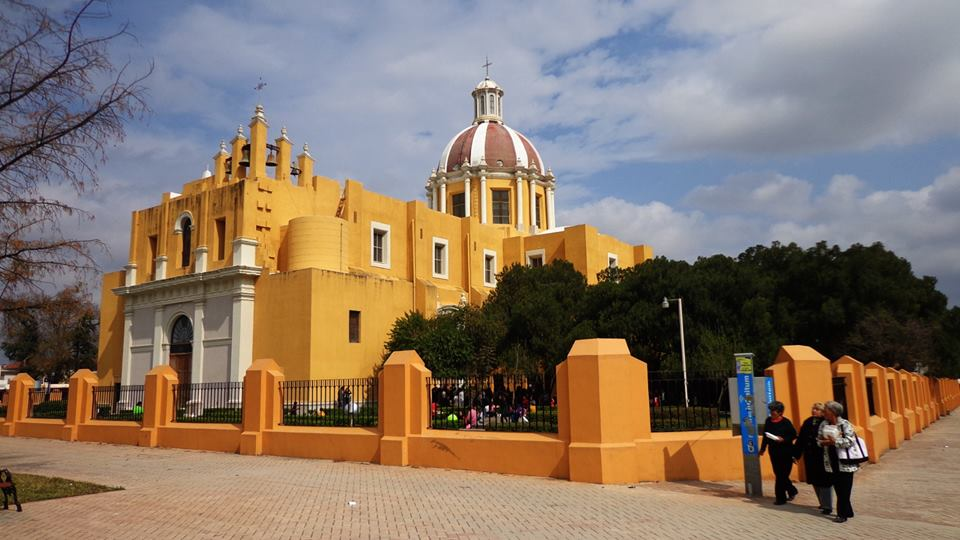
- Motto(s): Tierra Feraz y Privilegiada (Feracious and Privileged Land)
- Location within Nuevo León Location within Mexico
- Coordinates: 25°11′13.99″N 99°50′36.01″W
- Country: Mexico
- State: Nuevo León
- Settled: 1665
- Settled as: Villa de San Mateo del Pilón

Government
  - Municipal president: Luis Fernando Garza Guerrero "El Dragón"
  - Federal electoral district: Nuevo León's 9th

Area
  - Total: 1,869 km^{2} (722 sq mi)
  - City: 16.52 km^{2} (6.38 sq mi)

Population (2020 census)
  - Total: 67,428
  - Density: 36.08/km^{2} (93.44/sq mi)
  - City: 54,467
  - City density: 3,297/km^{2} (8,539/sq mi)
- Time zone: UTC-6 (Zona Centro)
- Postal code: 67515
- Area code: 826

Montemorelos is a city and surrounding municipality of 67,428 inhabitants located in the Northern Mexican state of Nuevo León, in the valley of the Pilon River. It was named after José María Morelos.

== History ==
In 1637, Governor Martín de Zavala promised a large tract of land in central Nuevo León to Captain Alonso de León on condition that, in less than a year, a colonial settlement is built and populated inside its borders. De León distributed the estate to his children and one of them, Alonso de León González ("The younger"), established his property in the northern banks of the Pilón River, organized an outpost and dedicated it to Our Lady of Regla, a black Madonna venerated by Catholics in Chipiona, Cádiz. The settlement grew rapidly and soon the residents requested the intervention of the Bishop of Guadalajara so that a church could be built and dedicated to St Matthew. The elevation of this parochial church in 1665 marks the foundation of modern-day Montemorelos.

== Geography ==
The municipality of Montemorelos is located in the central region of Nuevo León, near the city of Monterrey. Coordinates for Montemorelos are 25°11' N and 99°50' W. The area of the municipality is 1,869 square km. The municipality is surrounded by the Madre Oriental and Los Nogales mountain ranges. Montemorelos has several rivers, none of them navigable. The most important rivers located in the municipality are: Ramos, Pilón, Blanquillo, and Potosí rivers.

=== Climate ===
Montemorelos is in the temperate climate zone, according to classification of Wladimir Köppen in 1936, and the semi-warm climate sub-group of the subhumid type. It is warm and dry during the summertime, humid and cold in the winter. The average high temperature varies between 22 and 24 °C in the months of March, April, October and November. During the summer temperatures around 40 °C are common. Sporadic rains generally occur during September and October and also in March and April.

Climate data for Montemorelos (309 m)
Month	Jan	Feb	Mar	Apr	May	Jun	Jul	Aug	Sep	Oct	Nov	Dec	Year
Record high °C (°F)	35.5 (95.9)	38.0 (100.4)	41.5 (106.7)	43.5 (110.3)	43.5 (110.3)	43.5 (110.3)	43.5 (110.3)	45.0 (113.0)	45.5 (113.9)	37.0 (98.6)	38.5 (101.3)	38.5 (101.3)	45.5 (113.9)
Mean daily maximum °C (°F)	20.9 (69.6)	23.1 (73.6)	26.8 (80.2)	30.7 (87.3)	32.1 (89.8)	34.4 (93.9)	35.8 (96.4)	35.5 (95.9)	31.9 (89.4)	28.1 (82.6)	23.8 (74.8)	21.2 (70.2)	28.7 (83.7)
Daily mean °C (°F)	13.5 (56.3)	15.4 (59.7)	19.3 (66.7)	23.5 (74.3)	25.7 (78.3)	27.9 (82.2)	28.8 (83.8)	28.6 (83.5)	25.9 (78.6)	22.1 (71.8)	17.4 (63.3)	14.3 (57.7)	21.9 (71.4)
Mean daily minimum °C (°F)	6.2 (43.2)	7.8 (46.0)	11.8 (53.2)	16.4 (61.5)	19.4 (66.9)	21.5 (70.7)	21.8 (71.2)	21.7 (71.1)	20.0 (68.0)	16.1 (61.0)	11.1 (52.0)	7.4 (45.3)	15.1 (59.2)
Record low °C (°F)	−10.0 (14.0)	−10.0 (14.0)	0.0 (32.0)	5.0 (41.0)	8.5 (47.3)	10.0 (50.0)	15.0 (59.0)	11.5 (52.7)	10.0 (50.0)	6.0 (42.8)	−1.0 (30.2)	−4.0 (24.8)	−10.0 (14.0)
Average precipitation mm (inches)	16.5 (0.65)	24.1 (0.95)	30.7 (1.21)	54.5 (2.15)	94.5 (3.72)	104.2 (4.10)	56.5 (2.22)	119.7 (4.71)	191.1 (7.52)	116.7 (4.59)	37.7 (1.48)	18.3 (0.72)	864.5 (34.04)
Average rainy days	4.53	4.96	4.1	5.5	6.64	5.1	3.86	6.1	8.46	6.48	5.33	4.46	65.32
Average snowy days	0.16	0.03	0	0	0	0	0	0	0	0	0	0	0.19
Source: Colegio de Postgraduados: Normales climatológicas para el Estado de Nuevo León (in Spanish)

== Demographics ==
According to the INEGI 2005 Census the city of Montemorelos has 52,741 residents, of which 26,286 were male and 26,455 are female. Out of its population only 84 or 0.18% of its inhabitants are of Native Indian origin. 38,669 inhabitants belong to the Catholic Church, and 8,070 belonged to other religions. There are 14,327 households in the Montemorelos municipality of which 13,637 were owner occupied.

== Economy ==
=== Agricultural ===
Montemorelos is considered as the orchard of the State of Nuevo León for its fertile lands and growth of fruits and grains. Due to the quality of its citruses the city of Montemorelos is called the Orange Capital. It also cultivates grapefruits, tangerines, sorghum, maize, gleans and beans.

=== Industrial ===
To a great extent of the industries that exist in the municipality, rotate around citrus. The first processor of orange juice in Latin America was built in Montemorelos. Montemorelos also has assembly plants and manufacturing plants. The products that are handled are: shoes, dresses, books, and construction blocks.
