= Linares, Nuevo León =

Linares
- City
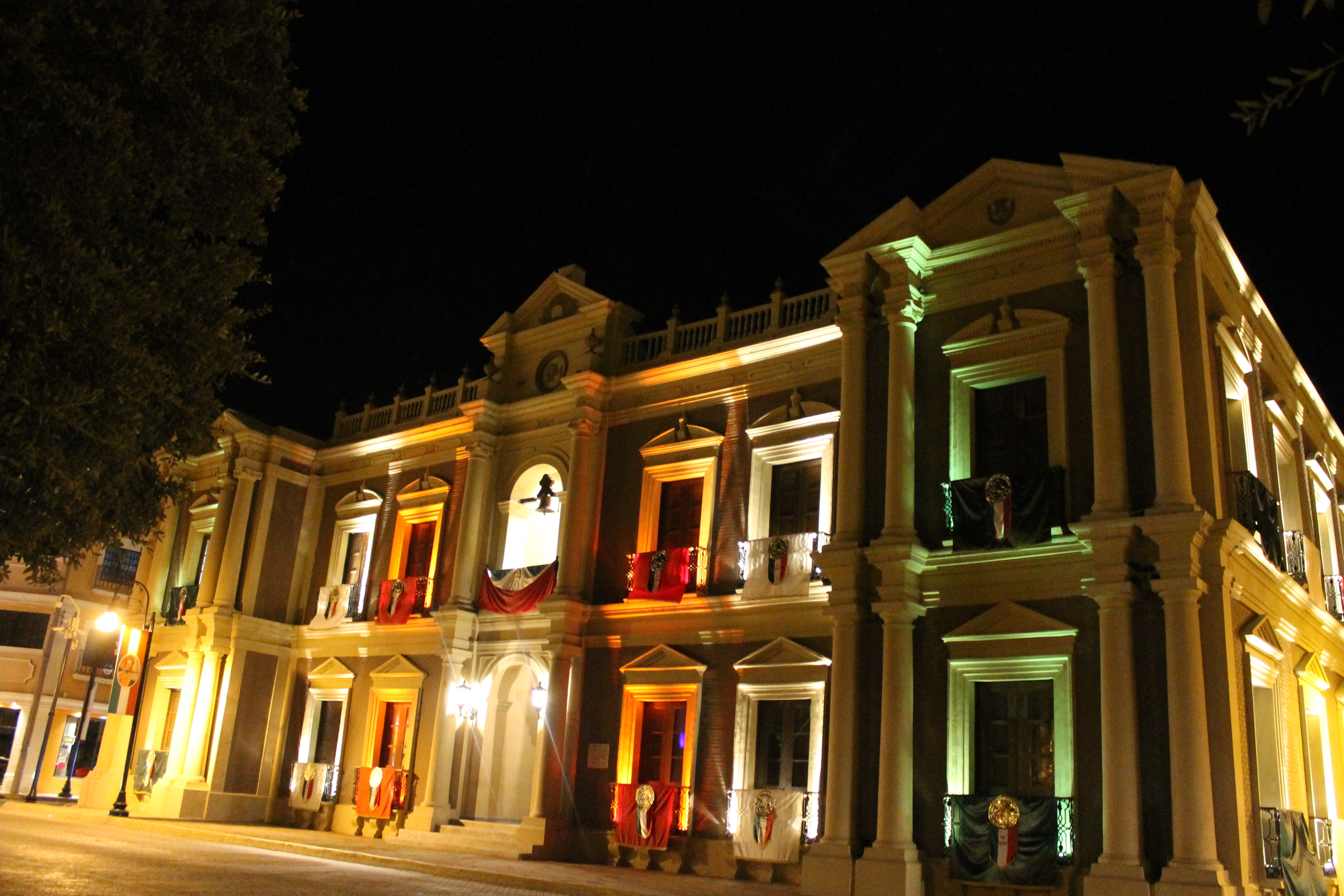
- The city hall

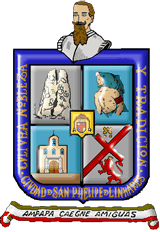
- Coat of arms

- Location within Nuevo León Location within Mexico
- Coordinates: 24°51′35″N 99°33′53″W
- Country: Mexico
- State: Nuevo León
- Municipality: Linares
- Founded: 10 April 1712
- Named for: Fernando de Alencastre, 1st Duke of Linares

Government
  - Federal electoral district: Nuevo León's 9th

Area
  - City: 20.63 km^{2} (7.97 sq mi)

Population (2020 census)
  - City: 70,378
  - Density: 3,411/km^{2} (8,836/sq mi)

Linares is a small city in the Mexican state of Nuevo León. The city serves as the administrative centre for the surrounding municipality of the same name and it is the largest urban centre of the so-called "orange belt" region. The city had a 2005 census population of 56,065, while the municipality's population was 71,061. The city and the municipality both rank tenth in population in the state. The municipality has an area of 2,445.2 km^{2} (944.1 sq mi) and lies in the east-southeast part of the state on the border with the state of Tamaulipas. The municipality of Hualahuises is an enclave of Linares municipality.

It was founded on 10 April 1712 by Sebastián Villegas Cumplido and named in honour of the serving Viceroy of New Spain, Fernando de Alencastre, 1st Duke of Linares.

Linares has a small industrial park and is well-connected to both Monterrey and the Gulf of Mexico via highway. It is also the main gateway to the southern part of the state.

Linares and its environs are the setting for Sofía Segovia's 2015 novel El murmullo de las abejas (The Murmur of Bees). The town is also where the legendary norteño band Los Cadetes De Linares originated from in the 1970s.

== Twin towns and sister cities ==
- Linares, Spain
- Linares, Colombia
- Linares, Chile
- Mission, Texas, United States
- Monclova, Mexico

== Locator maps ==
- 24°51′N 99°34′W
