= Doctor Arroyo, Nuevo León =

Doctor Arroyo Municipality
- Municipality
- Location within Nuevo León Location within Mexico
- Coordinates: 23°40′N 100°10′W
- Country: Mexico
- State: Nuevo León
- Municipal seat: Doctor Arroyo

Government
  - Federal electoral district: Nuevo León's 9th

Area
  - Total: 5,106.2 km^{2} (1,971.5 sq mi)
- Elevation: 1,720 m (5,640 ft)

Population (2010)
  - Total: 9,339
- Time zone: UTC-6 (Zona Centro)

Doctor Arroyo Municipality is a municipality located in the northeastern Mexican state of Nuevo León. It has a territorial extension of 5,106.2 km^{2}. The municipality was named in honor of José Francisco Arroyo de Anda. The municipality was renamed on September 22, 1826. The municipality had 33,269 inhabitants in the 2010 census.

== Geography ==
It lies in the Sierra Madre Oriental, it borders the municipalities of Aramberri and Galeana to the north, Mier y Noriega and the state of San Luis Potosí to the south and the municipalities of Aramberri, General Zaragoza, the state of Tamaulipas to the east. Doctor Arroyo is located in the zone there are great rivers of intermittent streams and a large mountain range, where occasional snowfall occurs in winter.
