= Galeana, Nuevo León =

Galeana

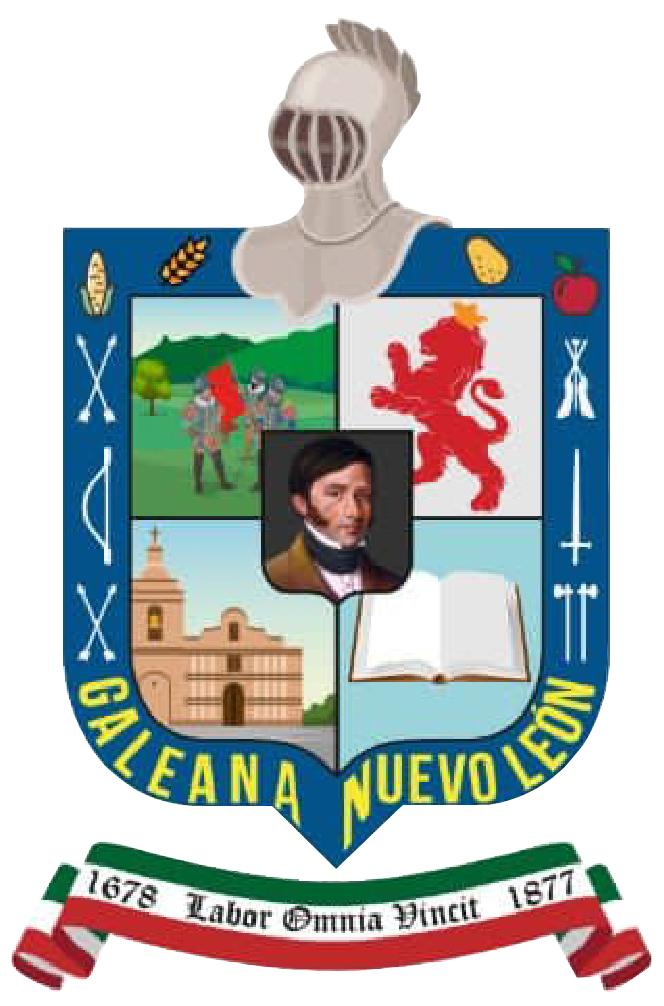
- Coat of arms
- Motto: Labor Omnia Vinat
- Location Galeana (Mexico)
- Coordinates: 24°50′N 100°04′W
- Country: Mexico
- State: Nuevo León
- Founded: 1678

Government
  - Mayor: Alejandro Javier Pedro Flores (PRI)
  - Federal electoral district: Nuevo León's 9th

Area
  - Total: 7,154.6 km^{2} (2,762.4 sq mi)
- Elevation: 1,655 m (5,430 ft)

Population (2005)
  - Total: 38,930
  - Density: 0.18/km^{2} (0.47/sq mi)
- Time zone: UTC-6 (Zona Centro)
- Website: http://www.galeana.gob.mx

Galeana is both a municipality and a city in the Mexican state of Nuevo León. It is named after Hermenegildo Galeana, a lieutenant involved in the country's movement towards independence. Galeana shares borders with the states of Coahuila, San Luis Potosí and Zacatecas to the west. With the municipalities of Aramberri and Doctor Arroyo to the south; Rayones to the north; and with Linares, Montemorelos, Rayones and Iturbide to the east. Galeana is the largest municipality in the state, totaling 7,154.6 km^{2} (2,762.4 sq mi); however, it is thinly populated with only 38,930 inhabitants, resulting in a population density of 0.18 persons per square kilometer. Galeana, the municipal seat, is the best developed town in the region. It has services such as hospitals, accommodations, restaurants, bars and the largest drink distributor in the zone. However, it remains as a low per-capita income city.

== Geography ==
Galeana is the largest municipality in the state, totaling 7,154.6 km^{2} (2,762.4 sq mi).

=== Climate ===
Climate in Galeana is usually much colder than the rest of the state. In summer it is pleasantly cool and during winter, temperatures may reach down to -9°C. Annual average temperature is 17°C, and the average rain precipitation is around 446 mm. The winter cold blends with a noticeable lack of air humidity. Predominant winds comes from the north.

Climate data for Galeana, Nuevo Leon, 1981-2010 normals, extremes 1974-present
Month	Jan	Feb	Mar	Apr	May	Jun	Jul	Aug	Sep	Oct	Nov	Dec	Year
Record high °C (°F)	30 (86)	32 (90)	38 (100)	36 (97)	39 (102)	40 (104)	37 (99)	36 (97)	33 (91)	32 (90)	34 (93)	33 (91)	40 (104)
Mean daily maximum °C (°F)	19.7 (67.5)	21.5 (70.7)	23.5 (74.3)	25.9 (78.6)	27.9 (82.2)	27.9 (82.2)	27.8 (82.0)	27.3 (81.1)	24.8 (76.6)	22.5 (72.5)	21.5 (70.7)	20.2 (68.4)	24.2 (75.6)
Mean daily minimum °C (°F)	5.7 (42.3)	6.9 (44.4)	8.6 (47.5)	10.4 (50.7)	12.7 (54.9)	14.0 (57.2)	13.9 (57.0)	13.4 (56.1)	12.3 (54.1)	9.1 (48.4)	7.7 (45.9)	5.7 (42.3)	10.0 (50.1)
Record low °C (°F)	−9 (16)	−7 (19)	−5 (23)	0 (32)	2 (36)	5 (41)	3 (37)	6 (43)	−5 (23)	0 (32)	−5 (23)	−8 (18)	−9 (16)
Average precipitation mm (inches)	21.8 (0.86)	8.2 (0.32)	9.7 (0.38)	26.7 (1.05)	46.2 (1.82)	62.6 (2.46)	57.7 (2.27)	67.2 (2.65)	82.9 (3.26)	42.1 (1.66)	7.8 (0.31)	13.2 (0.52)	446.1 (17.56)
Average rainy days (≥ 1 mm)	2.6	1.6	1.7	3.5	5.6	6.6	6.8	6.1	7.0	4.2	1.4	1.7	48.8

=== Crops ===
The main crop in Galeana is the potato, which is exported to different states and is also internationally shipped.

== Tourist attractions ==
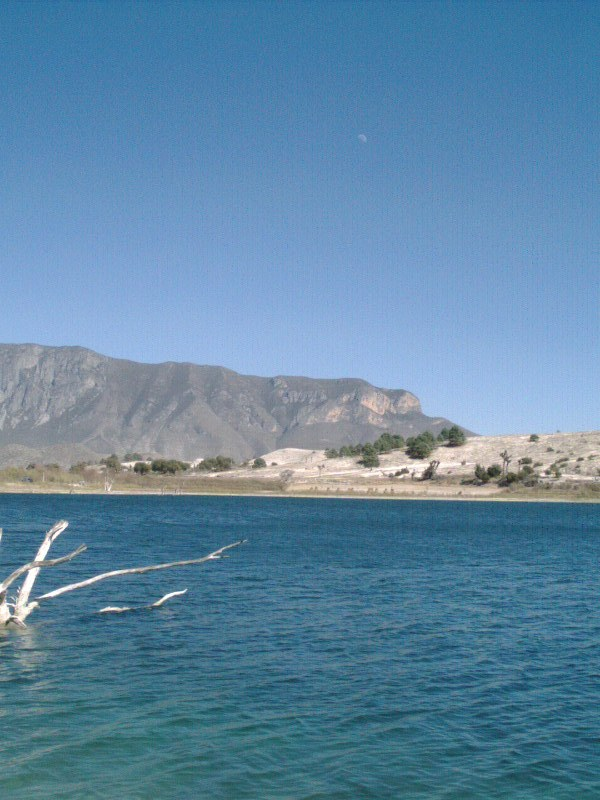
Laguna de Labradores

The municipality is known for its numerous tourist attractions. Probably the best known attraction is the Cerro del Potosí (Potosi's Mount), the highest mountain in the whole state, which rises over 3,600 meters above sea level. On the Rayones-Galeana highway lies El Puente de Dios (God's Bridge), a majestic natural archway that lies on top of a small creek. El Pozo del Gavilán is an enormous, deep natural cenote, where diverse species live. The Laguna de Labradores, in the capital, is a small lake connected to the Pozo del Gavilán.

== In popular culture ==
Galeana was mentioned in passing in episode 10 of season 3 of Better Call Saul as the place where Nacho Varga's mom lives.
