= 1810 in Mexico =

- Decades: 1790s; 1800s; 1810s; 1820s; 1830s
- See also: History of Mexico; List of years in Mexico; Timeline of Mexican history

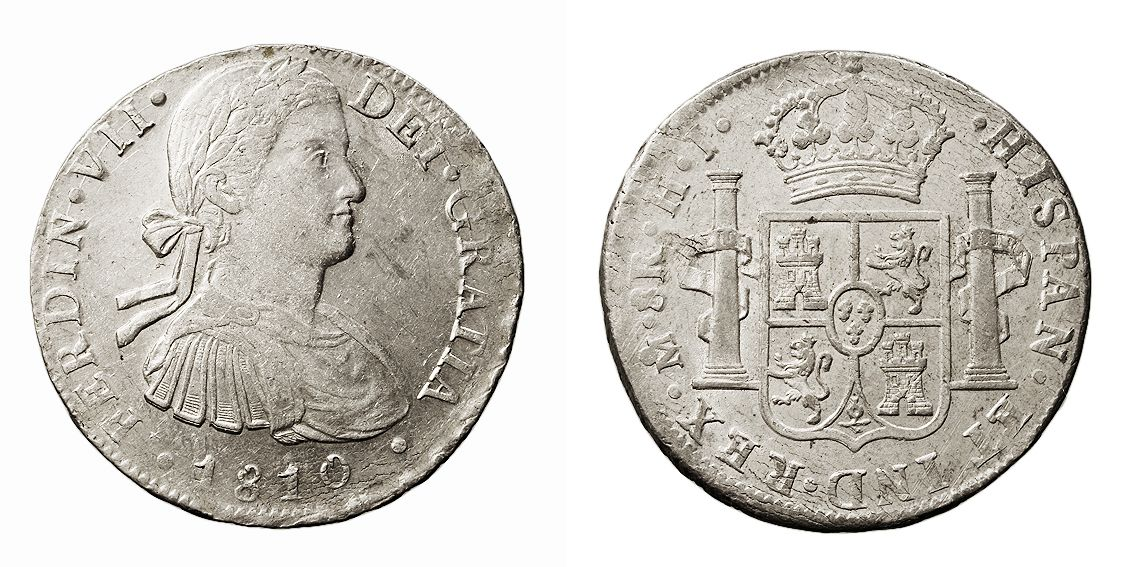
An 8 real Spanish coin from 1810, minted in Mexico.

Events in the year 1810 in Mexico. At this time Mexico was still part of the Spanish Empire as the Viceroyalty of New Spain.

== Incumbents ==
- Francisco Javier de Lizana y Beaumont – viceroy of New Spain until May 8, also served as Archbishop of Mexico for all of 1810
- Francisco Javier Venegas – viceroy of New Spain after September 14

== Events ==
- September 16 – Grito de Dolores: Miguel Hidalgo, a Catholic priest from Dolores, Guanajuato, incites the revolt that becomes Mexico's Independence War.
- September 28 – The door of the Alhóndiga de Granaditas is set on fire by El Pípila, allowing the Insurrection to take over the Spaniard's control of the building.
- October 30 – The Battle of Monte de las Cruces takes place in Ocoyoacac

== Notable births ==
=== Dates unknown ===
- Guillermo Castro – soldier, rancher, and magistrate, was born near Coyote, Alta California
