= Capture of Alhóndiga de Granaditas =

1810 battle of the Mexican War of Independence

Battle of the Alhóndiga de Granaditas
- Part of the Mexican War of Independence
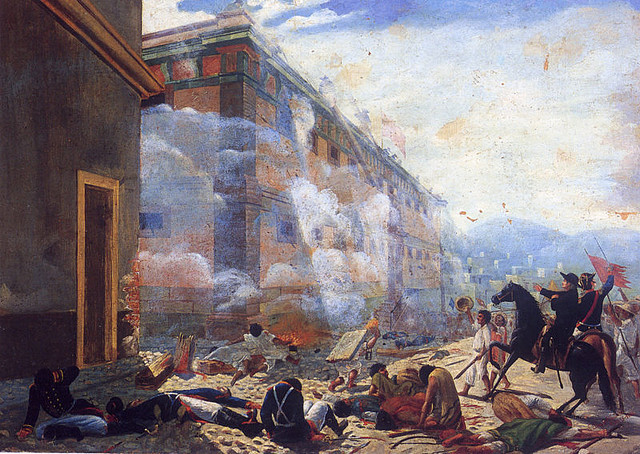
- The Battle of the Alhóndiga de Granaditas in Guanajuato on September 28, 1810; José Díaz del Castillo, 1910
Date	September 28, 1810
Location	Guanajuato, New Spain
Result	Rebel victory

Belligerents
Mexican rebels	Royalist Army

Commanders and leaders
Miguel Hidalgo; Ignacio Allende; Juan Aldama; José Mariano Jiménez; Mariano Abasolo	Juan Antonio Riaño; Diego Berzabal †

Units involved
50,000	2,500 Royalists

Casualties and losses
3,000	2,200

The capture of Alhóndiga de Granaditas was a military action carried out in Guanajuato, viceroyalty of New Spain, on September 28, 1810, between the royalist soldiers of the province and the insurgents commanded by Miguel Hidalgo and Ignacio Allende. The fear unleashed in the social circles of the provincial capital made the intendant, Juan Antonio Riaño, ask the population to barrack in the Alhóndiga de Granaditas, a granary built in 1800, and in whose construction Miguel Hidalgo had participated as an advisor to his old friend Riaño.

After several hours of combat, Riaño was killed and the Spaniards who had taken refuge there wished to surrender. The military in the viceroy's service continued the fight, until the insurgents managed to enter and then massacred not only the few guards that defended it, but also the numerous families of civilians who had taken refuge there. Many historians consider this confrontation more like a mutiny or massacre of civilians than a battle, since there were no conditions of military equality between the two sides.

== Background ==
The situation of political instability derived from the political crisis of 1808, both in the viceroyalty of New Spain and in Spain, and the Conjura de Valladolid in 1809 allowed liberal and pro-independence ideas to emerge in the Creole population. Towards the beginning of 1810, the corregidor Miguel Domínguez and his wife Josefa Ortiz de Domínguez organized a conspiracy in Querétaro against the viceregal government, which had accepted Napoleonic authority in Spain and its dominions. The viceregal military men Ignacio Allende, Juan Aldama and Mariano Abasolo, opposed to ideas of independence, wanted a protectorate governed by the "legitimate" king of Spain, Ferdinand VII, but with freedom for its inhabitants. The coup d'état was proposed for December 8, but was later postponed to October 2, the day of the San Juan de los Lagos fair where a large number of merchants and artisans would congregate. The Conspiracy of Querétaro, as historiography calls the conspiracy, needed a leader, which was soon found in the figure of the parish priest of Dolores, Miguel Hidalgo y Costilla —then 57 years old, landowner, former rector of the University of Saint Nicholas— with wide influence in social groups, mainly indigenous, and very respected in the Bajío. The conspiracy was discovered on September 11 and Allende was about to be arrested. Hidalgo decided, in his capacity as leader, to bring forward the date of the uprising and called for it on the morning of September 16 in his parish of Dolores, known as the Grito de Dolores (Cry of Dolores).

El tres de mayo de 1808 en Madrid (The Third of May 1808 in Madrid) by Francisco de Goya. The Spanish War of Independence was a direct antecedent of the Mexican Independence and the Capture of the Alhóndiga de Granaditas.

After the grito de Dolores, Hidalgo got a total of 6000 men to start his fight. In a few days he entered San Miguel El Grande and Celaya without resistance, where he obtained even more funds and soldiers for his fight. Upon occupying Atotonilco, in the Bajío prairie, Hidalgo took a banner of the Virgin of Guadalupe, religious symbol of the inhabitants of the viceroyalty of New Spain that in the 16th century, after her apparition in Tepeyac, motivated the conversion to Catholicism of many indigenous people. This image would serve as Hidalgo's banner in his battles, it would be captured in the battle of Calderón Bridge and taken to Spain as a trophy; but in 1910, in the celebrations of the Centennial of the Independence, it was returned to Mexico. On September 24, Allende took Salamanca, where Hidalgo was proclaimed Captain General of the Armies of America and Allende Lieutenant General. In this city there was resistance and an attempt to sack, put down by Aldama. Upon leaving Salamanca, Hidalgo already had fifty thousand men for the fight.

The response from the Spanish side was not long in coming. The archbishop of Mexico, Francisco Javier de Lizana, who had pardoned the conspirators of Valladolid, was relieved on September 14 by Francisco Javier Venegas, participant in the Battle of Bailén, who enjoyed the confidence of the Spaniards for his toughness. He immediately ordered the intendant of Puebla, Manuel Flon, to stop the outbreaks in his province. Manuel Abad y Queipo, bishop of Michoacán and another friend of Hidalgo, excommunicated him and all the insurgents by means of a papal bull of September 27. Hidalgo ignored this and continued the struggle.

== Capture ==
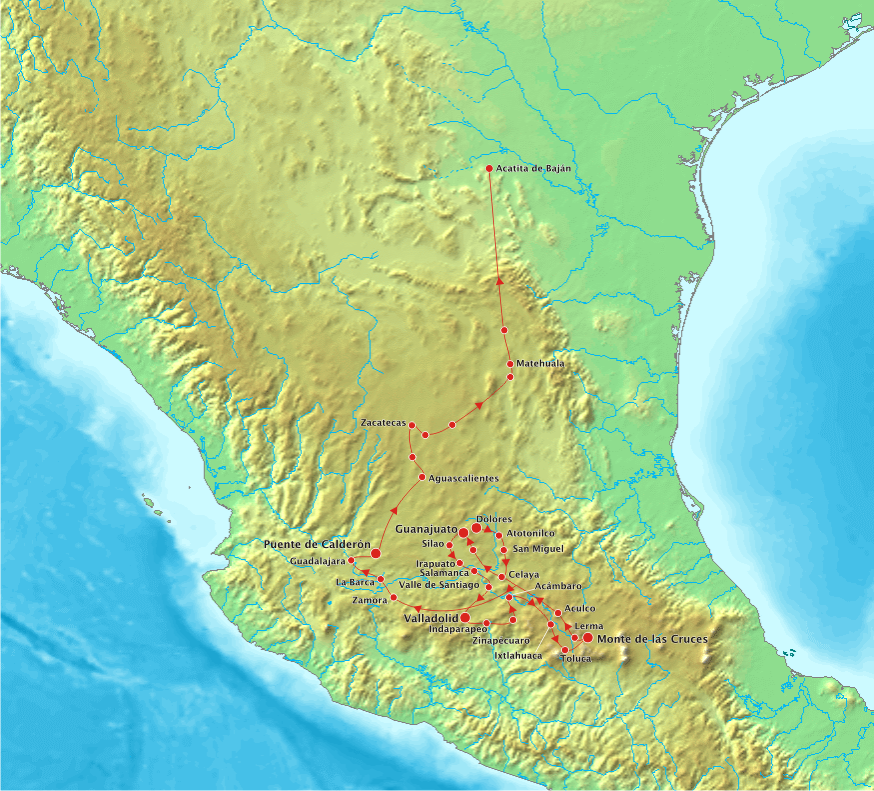
Map of Hidalgo's Campaign, which included the Alhóndiga confrontation.

Hidalgo sent José Mariano Jiménez as an emissary. He was a miner with no military training who asked Allende for permission to join the troops; Allende refused but Hidalgo decided to send him on a special mission to intimidate Riaño and request the surrender of the city of Guanajuato without violence. Below is the text of the letter:

[...] I do not see the Europeans as enemies, but only as an obstacle that hinders the success of our enterprise. Your Honor will be good enough to express these ideas to the Europeans who have gathered in that Alhóndiga, so that they may decide whether to declare themselves enemies or agree to remain as prisoners receiving humane and benign treatment, as those we are bringing in our company are experiencing, until the insinuated freedom and independence [sic?] is achieved, in which case they will enter the class of citizens, remaining entitled to the restitution of the goods that for now, for the demands of the nation, we will make use of. If, on the contrary, they do not accede to this request, I will apply all the forces and devices to destroy them, without any hope of quarter remaining to them.

Riaño was born in Liérganes, Santander (Spain), and was a man of the sea, as he participated in several naval battles and reached the rank of frigate captain. In 1786, when Charles III dictated the ordinances for the proper functioning of the viceroyalty of New Spain, Riaño changed his title to lieutenant general and in 1795 he was appointed intendant of Guanajuato. There he became friends with Hidalgo, parish priest of Dolores and with Manuel Abad y Queipo, then governor of the diocese of Michoacán. Upon receiving Hidalgo's letter, he refused to accept the request, claiming to be a soldier of the King of Spain and recognizing Viceroy Venegas as the only authority. Upon learning of his former friend's response, Hidalgo decided to initiate combat.

Allende, Aldama and Jiménez divided equally to besiege Guanajuato. At first they did not encounter any resistance; on the contrary, they received support in money and soldiers. Some of their informants gave reports on the military state of the fortress and the wealth guarded there. The combat began around eight o'clock in the morning, when the first shots were heard over the alhóndiga. Riaño ordered Lieutenant Barceló, captain of the guard, to go up to the roof to face the possible invasions. The quartermaster, meanwhile, remained on the first floor resisting the insurgent sieges. Barceló, from the heights, counterattacked with bombs and rifle shots. Riaño saw that it was impossible for either side to win, since the royalists were deprived of any mobility, so he decided to leave with a handful of men. When one of the insurgent chiefs became aware of Riaño's presence, he ordered an attack on the royalist chief, who perished when he tried to defend himself. The soldiers who left with the quartermaster withdrew taking the body with them.

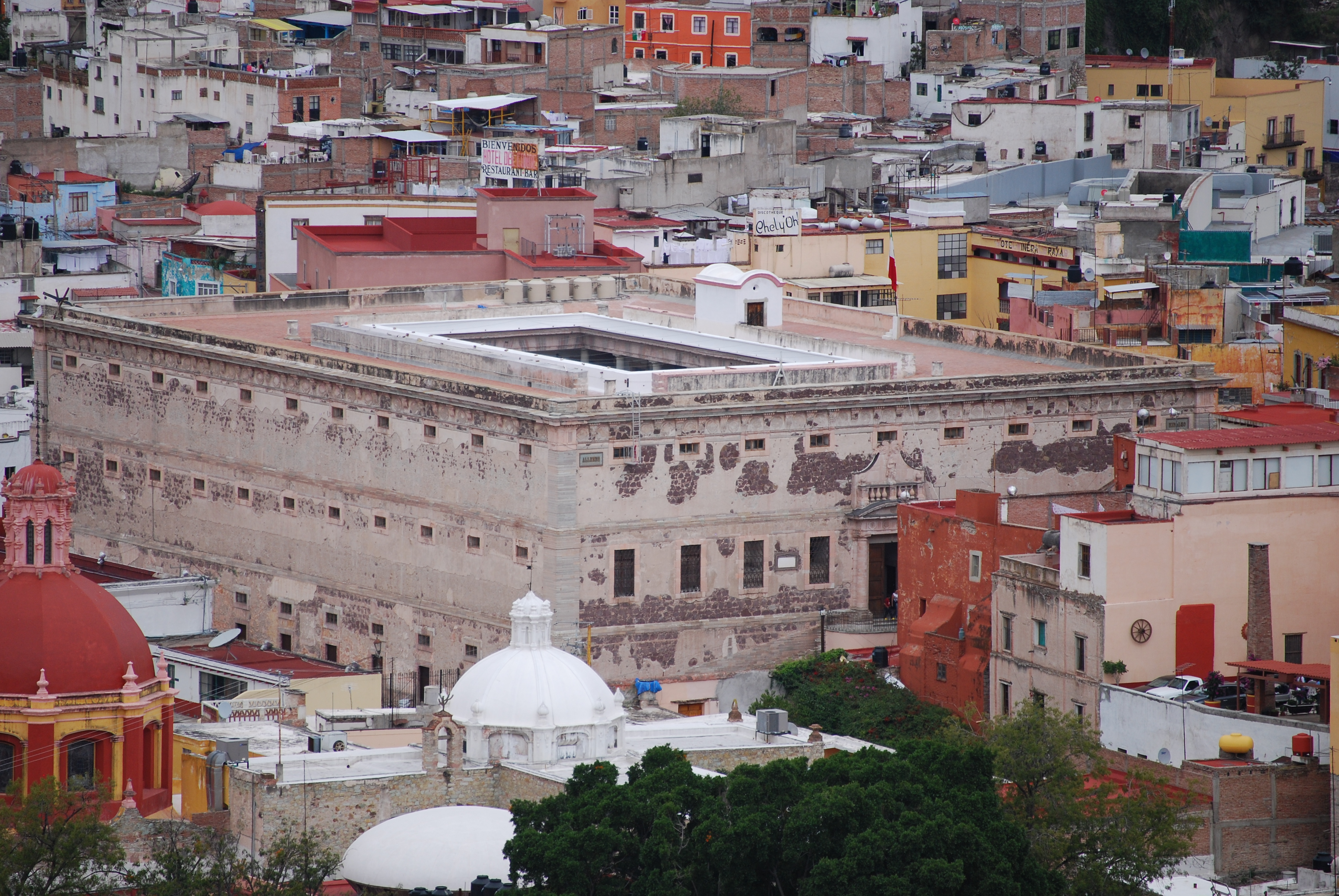
View of the Alhóndiga de Granaditas.

Upon seeing the quartermaster dead, one of Riaño's advisors suggested to Lieutenant Barceló the surrender, and that he, as second in command, should take the reins of the situation. Barceló flatly refused, stating that it was a combat and that the military authority, which he represented, was superior to the civilian one at that time of war. However, Riaño's advisor got a white handkerchief and tied it to a rifle of a soldier fallen in combat. He began to wave his new peace flag and when the insurgents saw it, they realized that the Spaniards had decided to surrender. Hidalgo ordered a ceasefire and sent Allende to negotiate with the defeated.

Barceló killed the civilian who waved the flag and went up to the roof to continue the bombing. The insurgents realized they had been tricked and continued the fight. On the insurgent side Hidalgo considered the possibility of taking the building, but he did not want to do it and did not have the resources. According to the official version, it was then when Juan José de los Reyes Martínez, a miner from La Valenciana famous for his strength and nicknamed El Pípila, asked Hidalgo for permission to set fire to the door of the Alhóndiga, which would allow the insurgents to enter it. After meditating, the priest agreed and El Pípila went into action.

After setting fire to the threshold (reinforced with iron plates) of the Alhóndiga, the rebels were able to enter it and went on a massacre and looting spree. Barceló and Riaño's son, both royalist commanders, were killed by the mob. Many Spaniards and Creoles were also stripped of their belongings and suffered death at the hands of the crowds. The sacking of Guanajuato was not only limited to the Alhóndiga, but in the following days it spread to the city and the metropolitan area. Hidalgo prevented some of his soldiers from defiling the body of his friend Riaño, and it was then that he realized the looting that the city was experiencing. On October 1, the insurgent troops abandoned Guanajuato.

== Consequences ==
After leaving Guanajuato, the insurgents took the road to Valladolid, where the inhabitants, after hearing the news, fled to other parts of the country so as not to repeat the action of Guanajuato. Valladolid fell without any resistance on October 17, and on October 25 Toluca was taken, with a view to taking the capital. On October 30 the insurgents triumphed in the Battle of Monte de las Cruces. Therefore, the rebels were anxious to enter Mexico City, then described by the German traveler Alexander von Humboldt as "La ciudad de los palacios" (The city of palaces). But Hidalgo decided to send Mariano Abasolo and Allende as emissaries on November 1 to negotiate with Venegas the peaceful surrender of the city to the rebel troops. The viceroy, far from accepting an agreement, was about to shoot the negotiators, but for the intervention of the Archbishop of Mexico and another viceroy, Francisco Javier de Lizana. Hidalgo reflected and, on the night of November 3, he ordered the march of the Insurgent Army not towards the capital, but towards the Bajío, where on November 7 Calleja caught up with them in San Jerónimo Aculco, place where they were defeated, an event known as the Battle of Aculco. After the defeat, a rift arose between Hidalgo and Allende, so the priest of Dolores decided to retire to Valladolid, thus accentuating the differences and the rift with Allende.

== Commemoration ==
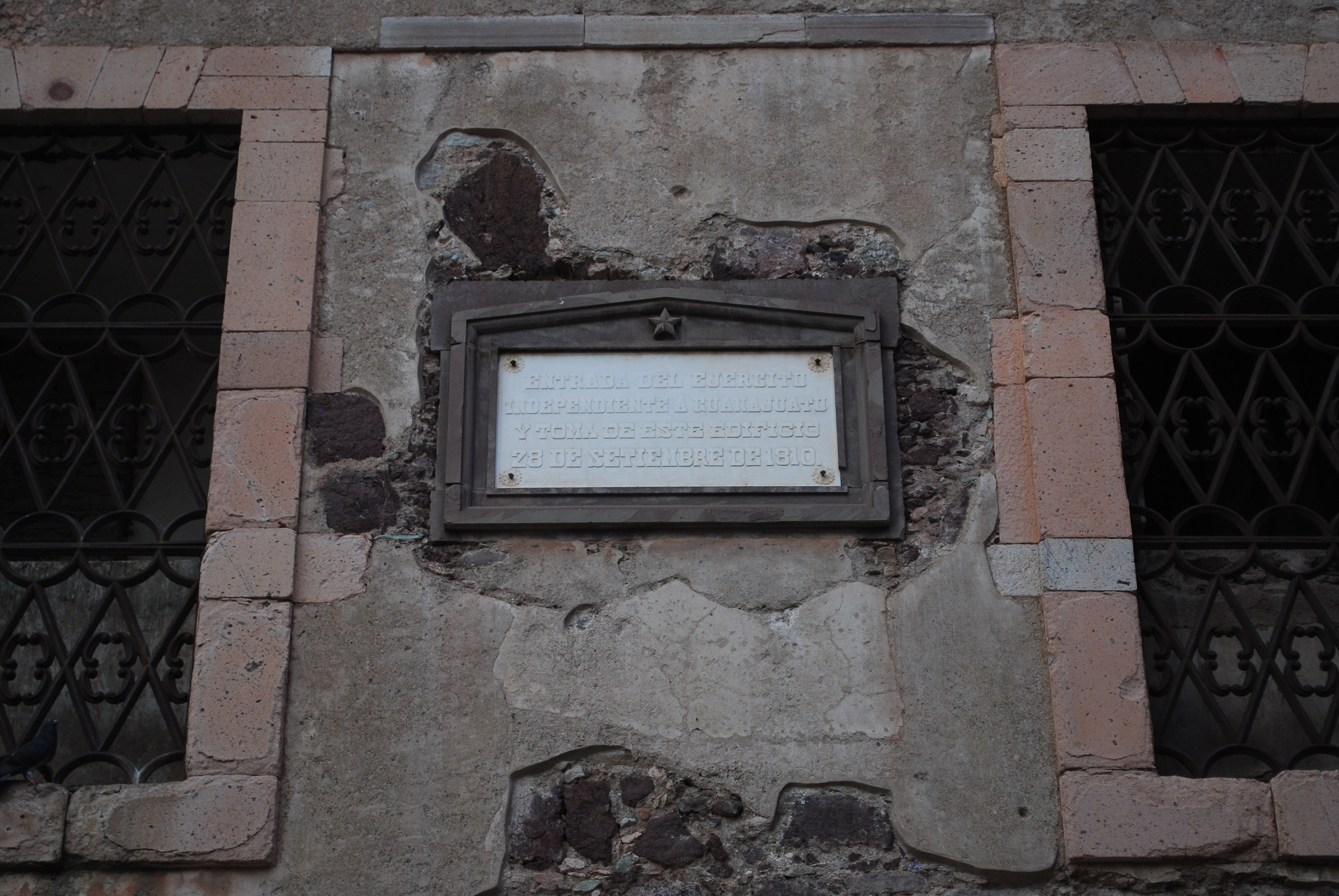
Commemorative plaque: "Entering of the independent army to Guanajuato and taking of this building. September 28th, 1810."

The Capture of the Alhóndiga de Granaditas is commemorated every September 28 with a civic parade in which both students from the municipality's schools and local and state government officials participate.

In addition, on the 28th of each month, the ceremony of renewal of the "symbolic fire" of freedom takes place inside the Alhóndiga, with the participation of the Governor of the State and various invited personalities.

== See also ==
- Miguel Hidalgo y Costilla
- Ignacio Allende
- Félix María Calleja del Rey
- Mexican War of Independence

== Bibliography ==
- Casasola, Gustavo (1976). Seis siglos de historia gráfica de México (in Spanish). Vol. 12. Mexico City: Editorial Trillas.
- Esquivel Milán, Gloria; et al. (Enrique Figueroa Alfonso) (1997). Historia de México (in Spanish). Oxford: OXFORD UNIVERSITY PRESS. ISBN 970-613-092-6.
- Fuentes Mares, José (1984). Historia ilustrada de México, de Hernán Cortés a Miguel de la Madrid (in Spanish). Editorial Océano. ISBN 968-491-047-9.
- Meyer, Jean (1996). Hidalgo, en la serie "La antorcha encendida" (in Spanish). Mexico: Editorial Clío. ISBN 968-6932-42-9.
- Moreno, Salvador (1994). Historia de México, tercer curso (in Spanish). Guadalajara: Ediciones Pedagógicas. ISBN 968-417-230-3.
- Rosas, Alejandro (2006). Mitos de la Historia Mexicana (in Spanish). Puebla: Editorial Planeta. ISBN 970-37-0555-3.
- Treviño, Héctor Jaime (1998). Historia de México (in Spanish). Editorial Castillo. ISBN 970-20-0019-X.
- Vasconcelos, José (1983) [1939]. Breve Historia de México (in Spanish). Toluca: Secretaria de Educacíon Pública, Cultura SEP. ISBN 968-24-4924-3.
- Villalpando, José Manuel (2001). Los Presidentes de México (in Spanish). México: Editorial Planeta.
- Zárate, Julio (1981). México a través de los siglos (in Spanish). Mexico: Editorial Cumbre.
