= Ignacio Aldama =

Mexican lawyer and military officer (1780-1811)

Ignacio Aldama y González
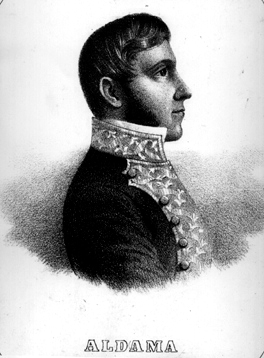

Alcalde of San Miguel el Grande
- In office 16 September 1810 – c. late 1810
- Preceded by: Royalist authorities
- Succeeded by: Royalist authorities (reoccupation)

Emissary to the United States of America
- In office February 1811 – March 1811 (captured en route)
- Appointed by: Ignacio Allende

Personal details
- Born: 7 May 1780 San Miguel el Grande, Viceroyalty of New Spain (now San Miguel de Allende, Guanajuato, Mexico)
- Died: 20 June 1811 (aged 31) Monclova, Nueva Vizcaya, Viceroyalty of New Spain
- Cause of death: Execution by firing squad
- Relatives: Juan Aldama (brother); Mariano Aldama (nephew); Antonio Aldama (nephew)
- Education: Royal and Pontifical University of Mexico
- Occupation: Lawyer; merchant; military officer

Military service
- Allegiance: Mexican Insurgency
- Branch/service: Insurgent Army
- Years of service: 1810–1811
- Rank: Field marshal
- Battles/wars: Mexican War of Independence; Battle of Aculco; Battle of Calderón Bridge

Ignacio Aldama y González (7 May 1780 – 20 June 1811) was a Mexican lawyer, merchant and rebel leader during the early phase of the Mexican War of Independence. Although often overshadow by more prominent figures such as Miguel Hidalgo, Ignacio Allende and his own brother Juan Aldama, he played a pivotal role in stablishing the first rebel provincial government in his hometown of San Miguel el Grande and was one of the earliest emissaries sent to seek foreign support for the independence movement.

== Early life and career ==
Born Ignacio Aldama y González on 7 May 1780 in San Miguel el Grande, Guanajuato to a prosperous family of Hacendados, he studied law in Mexico City at the Royal and Pontifical University of Mexico. Finding the legal profession unprofitable in his hometown, he turned to commerce and amassed a considerable fortune that he would later used for his revolutionary activities.

Aldama joined the clandestine meeting of the Querétaro conspiracy in 1810 at the invitation of his brother, Captain Juan Aldama. Using his influence in the region, he helped organize a group of local support in San Miguel willing to take up arms or provide assistance.

== Mexican War of Independence ==
On 16 September 1810, the day of the Grito de Dolores, Aldama was in Aculco when news of the spontaneous uprising reached him. He swiftly headed back to San Miguel and was appointed military commander and alcalde of the town council, establishing the first insurgent government. As alcalde, he abolished the colonial tributes and levies and freed the indigenous people who had been bound by debt to the haciendas. on 24 September 1810 he signed a formal accord recognizing Hidalgo's broader authority.

He subsequently joined the Insurgent Army in campaigns through the Bajío region. After a new provincial government was established in Guadalajara, he distinguished himself in his efforts to organize the administration and in the publication of the newspaper El Despertar Americano.

In 1811, following the royalist victory at the Battle of Calderón Bridge and the insurgent's retreat northward, the leadership decided to seek foreign aid. In Saltillo, Ignacio Allende formally appointed him as emissary of the insurgent forces to the government of the United States. Accompany by Friar Juan Salazar, he was given approximately 100 silver bars and tasked with securing financial support, arms and supplies.

The party travelled north through Coahuila and reached San Antonio de Béjar with relative ease. However, in early March, they were capture by the royalist forces of José Manuel Zambrano alongside Juan Bautista de las Casas, the insurgent leader in the region

Aldama was sent to Monclova, where he underwent a summary military trial and was condemned to death. He was executed by firing squad on 20 June 1811, being the first major rebel leader to be put to death.

While awaiting execution, he wrote a lengthy manifesto in which he recanted his participation in the insurrection. Historians note that while the manifesto is attributed to Aldama, its expressions of regret may have been written under duress or coercion, a common occurrence for condemned rebels facing execution.

== Legacy ==
Aldama is considered a national hero and is honored collectively with his brother Juan, with several place in Mexico bearing their names. Most notably the city of León de Los Aldama in Guanajuato and the municipality of Los Aldamas in Nuevo León.
