= Mariano Abasolo =

Mexican revolutionist (1783–1816)

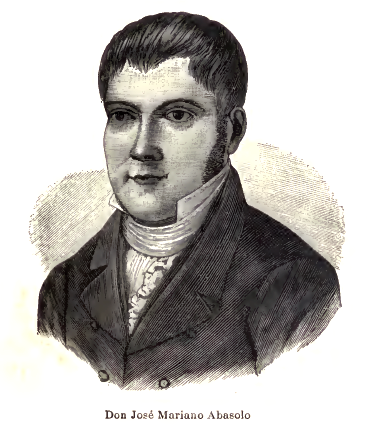
- Born: 29 March 1783; Dolores, Guanajuato, New Spain (now Mexico)
- Died: 14 April 1816 (aged 33); Cádiz, Spain
- Known for: participation in Mexican War of Independence

José Mariano Sixto de Abasolo y Rodríguez (1783–1816) was a Mexican revolutionist, born at Dolores, Guanajuato. He participated in the revolution started by Miguel Hidalgo.

== Biography ==
In 1809 he belonged to one of the first conspiracy groups located in Valladolid (today's Morelia). The conspiracy was discovered but Ignacio Allende and Abasolo were not imprisoned. Immediately they joined another conspiracy group in Queretaro.

Abasolo was rich; mainly he economically supported the independence movement and was not involved in many military actions. At the beginning of the war, on 15 September 1810, he was ordered by Hidalgo to seize all the weapons and munitions that were kept in the arsenal of Dolores. In 1810 he went with the independent army to San Miguel el Grande (today's San Miguel de Allende), Celaya, where he was named captain of the Dragones de la Reyna regiment. On 30 September 1810, Guanajuato was taken, they went to Valladolid (today's Morelia) but the army did not take the city. The insurgents began to leave for Mexico City, the independent army having 80,000 soldiers. For an undocumented reason Hidalgo chose not to attack the city. In Acámbaro Abasolo was named field marshal and took place in the combats of Monte de las Cruces, Aculco and Puente de Calderón.

On 21 March 1811, in Acatita de Baján, Coahuila, he and others were taken prisoners by the Spanish. Hidalgo, Allende and others were sentenced to death in Chihuahua but Abasolo was sentenced to ten years' imprisonment in the Santa Catalina castle at Cádiz, Spain, where he died on 14 April 1816.
