= José Mariano Jiménez =

Mexican engineer and rebel officer (1781-1811)

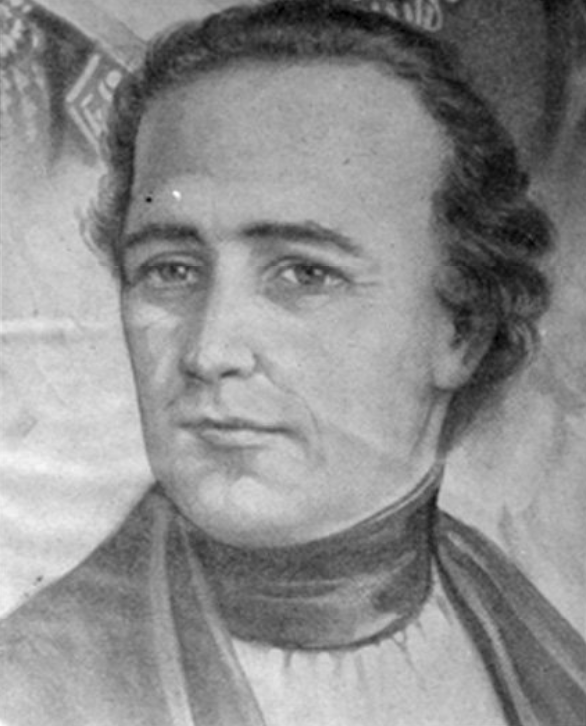
- Portrait of Jiménez
- Born: August 18, 1781; San Luis Potosí, New Spain
- Died: June 26, 1811 (aged 29); Chihuahua, New Spain
- Burial place: Angel of Independence
- Spouse: Mariana Ayala y Barreda (m. 1805)
- Military career
- Allegiance: Mexico
- Service years: 1810-1811
- Rank: colonel
- Unit: Insurgent Army
- Conflicts: See list: Mexican War of Independence; Capture of Alhóndiga; Capture of Valladolid; Skirmish of Atenco; Battle of Monte de las Cruces; Battle of Aguanueva; Battle of Puerto del Carneo
- Other work: Mine Engineer

José Mariano Jiménez (August 18, 1781 – June 26, 1811) was a Mexican engineer and rebel officer active at the beginning of the Mexican War of Independence.

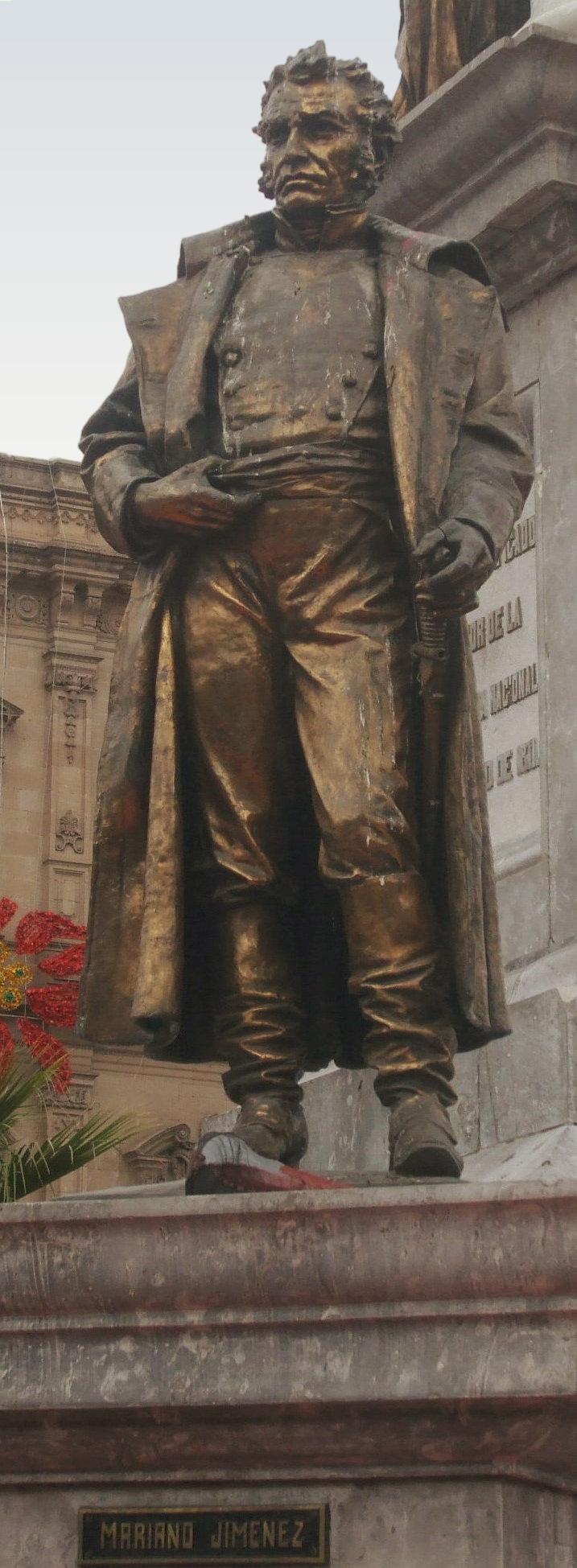
Statue of Jiménez in Chihuahua.

Mariano Jiménez was born in San Luis Potosí. He studied at the Colegio de Minería in Mexico City to become a mining engineer. He graduated in 1804. He soon moved to Guanajuato, where he was able to follow the progress of the conspiracy led by Miguel Hidalgo that aimed to achieve the independence of Mexico from Spain. A few days after the war started, Jiménez joined Hidalgo's army and was able to rise quickly in rank until he achieved the rank of lieutenant colonel.

He distinguished himself on the battlefield, such as during the Battle of Monte de las Cruces where his positioning of the artillery line was instrumental for the rebel victory. He was a very active officer and participated in the defense of Guadalajara and San Luis Potosí.

Mariano Jiménez went to Mexico city to ask for the surrender of the city but the viceroy denied it, he went back to Guanajuato city and participated in her defense because the city was attacked by Calleja on November 24, after he went to Guadalajara and San Luis Potosí.

A betrayal by one of his subordinates led to his capture at the Wells of Baján (Norias de Baján) in Coahuila in 1811. He was tried for insubordination and executed by firing squad on June 26, 1811, together with other members of the insurgency such as Ignacio Allende and Juan Aldama in Chihuahua.

Jiménez's body was decapitated and his head taken to the Alhóndiga de Granaditas, where it was shown to the public inside a cage hung from one corner of the building. In 1925, his remains were moved to the mausoleum in the Independence Column in Mexico City.

== See also ==
- Mexican War of Independence
- Felix María Calleja
