= Juan Aldama =

Mexican military officer (1774-1811)

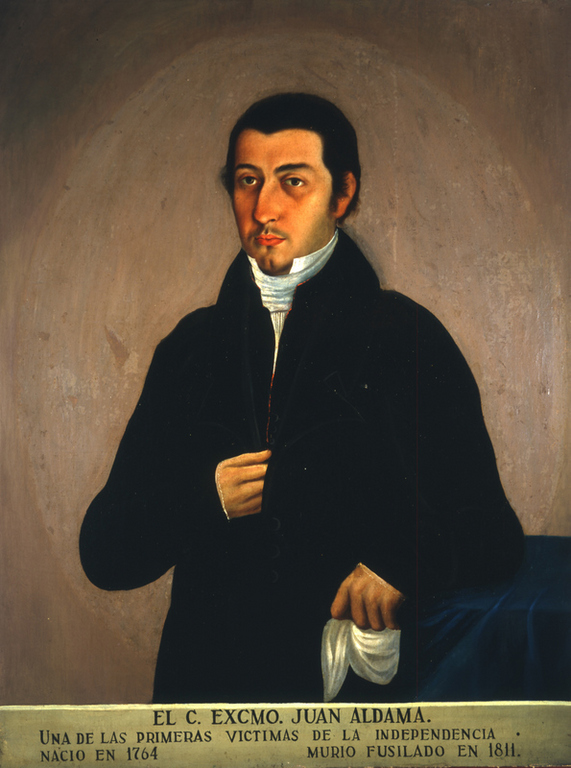
- Born: 3 January 1774; San Miguel el Grande, Viceroyalty of New Spain (now San Miguel de Allende, Guanajuato, Mexico)
- Died: 26 June 1811 (aged 37); Chihuahua, Nueva Vizcaya, Viceroyalty of New Spain
- Cause of death: Execution by firing squad
- Resting place: Column of Independence
- Relatives: Ignacio Aldama (brother); Mariano Aldama (nephew); Antonio Aldama (nephew)
- Military career
- Allegiance: Spain; Mexican Insurgency
- Branch: Spanish Army; Insurgent Army
- Service years: c. 1795–1811
- Rank: Captain (Spain); Lieutenant General (Insurgency)
- Commands: Regimiento de Dragones
- Battles/wars: Mexican War of Independence; Capture of Alhóndiga de Granaditas; Capture of Valladolid; Battle of Monte de las Cruces; Battle of Aculco; Battle of Guanajuato; Battle of Calderón Bridge

Juan José Marcos Gaspar Antonio de Aldama y González (3 January 1774 – 26 June 1811) commonly known simply as Juan Aldama was a Mexican rebel leader, military officer and alongside Miguel Hidalgo and Ignacio Allende, one of the core instigators of the Mexican War of Independence. A criollo captain in the provincial militia of New Spain, he helped organize the Querétaro conspiracy, personally warned Hidalgo and Allende of its discovery, participated in the Grito de Dolores, and commanded the Insurgent Army's earliest campaigns before his capture and execution by royalist forces.

== Early life and military career ==
Juan José Marcos Gaspar Antonio de Aldama y González was born on 3 January 1774 in San Miguel el Grande (today San Miguel de Allende), Guanajuato, in the heart of the wealthy Bajío region to a prosperous criollo family of hacendados with social ties extending to both Guanajuato and Querétaro. Like many ambitious criollos of his generation, Aldama sough social advancement and status through the rigid caste system of New Spain by way of military service. following the 1795 reorganization of New Spain's provincial militias, he entered the Regimiento de Dragones Provinciales de la Reina, a cavalry unit based in his hometown of San Miguel el Grande. He began as lieutenant and had been promoted to captain by 1808. By 1810, he was a widower and father of two daughters.

== The Querétaro conspiracy and the outbreak of rebellion ==
Aldama became involved in the Querétaro conspiracy, a network of local elites, military officers and intellectuals who met in secret tertulias that masked political discussions. key figures included the Corregidor Miguel Domínguez and his wife Josefa Ortiz de Domínguez, fellow military officer Ignacio Allende, his own brother Ignacio Aldama and eventually Father Miguel Hidalgo y Costilla, whom Aldama and Allende personally drew into the plot.

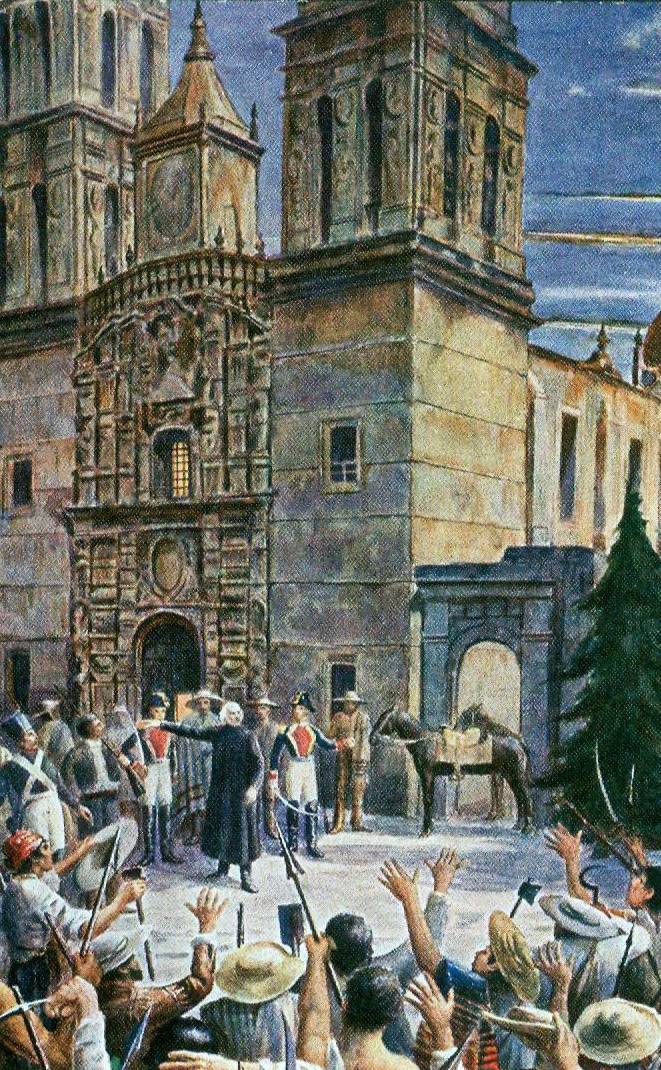
Hidalgo flanked by Allende and Aldama kickstarts Mexico's war for independence.

When the plot was discovered in mid-September and arrest began in Querétaro, Josefa Ortiz de Domínguez instructed prison warden Ignacio Pérez Álvarez to warm Allende in San Miguel el Grande. Pérez rode urgently in horseback from Querétaro covering the distance in a grueling overnight. He arrived in San Miguel in early 15 September but found that Allende was not there. He instead located Aldama and they rode together through the night to the town of Dolores. Arriving around 2 in the morning on 16 September. They delivered the urgent warning to Hidalgo and Allende. Forced to make an immediate decision the group chose to launch the revolt right away rather than flee or delay.

Aldama and Allende flank Hidalgo as he delivered his call to arms. The group then liberated prisoners, arrested the local authorities and began mobilizing supporters under the image of the Virgen de Guadalupe.

== Military leadership in the Insurgent Army ==
When the insurgent column reached San Miguel el Grande, the Regimiento de Dragones remained loyal to their captains Aldama and Allende and largely joined the revolt, bringing along their horses and firearms, providing the insurgents with their first organized contigent and professional military structure.

The insurgent forces quickly captured Celaya and Guanajuato City, the latter stormed on 28 september amid significant indiscriminate violence and looting at the Alhóndiga de Granaditas. Valladolid was occupied with less bloodshed on 17 October. on 22 October at Acámbaro, the insurgents formalized leadership, Hidalgo was proclaimed Generalísimo, Allende as Capitán general was made second in command, while Aldama as Teniente general, ranked third.

Aldama contributed to early successes, including the pivotal victory at Monte de las Cruces that cleared the road for the advance to Mexico City. However, the leadership debated whether to assault the capital. Professional military officers urged pressing forward and storming Mexico City while the insurgents held the advantage. Hidalgo, however, decided against an assault on the capital, fearing massive civilian casualties and looting and ordered a retreat toward Guadalajara. Subsequent royalist victories at Aculco and the recapture of Guanajuato exposed the insurgents’ organizational weaknesses. The decisive defeat came against forces of Félix María Calleja at the Battle of Calderón Bridge as internal tensions between Hidalgo’s charismatic appeal to the rural masses and the more disciplined, professional outlook of officers continue to increase.

== Capture, trial, and execution ==
Following the defeat at Calderón Bridge, Aldama joined the northern march toward Saltillo that ultimately hoped to reach the United States for arms, supplies, and possible diplomatic support. At the Pabellón hacienda, the military chiefs effectively removed Hidalgo from supreme command and learned of the news that Viceroy Francisco Javier Venegas was willing to granted them a pardon on the condition that they handed over their weapons and surrender. Despite the situation they were facing, the insurgents replied defiantly with Aldama being one of the most insistent on continuing northwards, even arranging his brother Ignacio's appointment as emissary to the U.S.

On 21 March 1811, the insurgent column numbering roughly 900–1,000 men was ambushed and captured with little resistance at Wells of Baján near Monclova, Coahuila. Royalist captain, Ignacio Elizondo, who had earlier feigned sympathy for the insurgents, sprang the trap with approximately 150 royalist soldiers.

The leaders were taken to Chihuahua for trial by royalist court-martial. On 26 June 1811, Aldama was executed by firing squad, alongside Allende, José Mariano Jiménez and Manuel de Santa María. Hidalgo was executed at a later date after being defrocked. The heads of Hidalgo, Aldama, Allende and Jiménez were severed and sent to Guanajuato, where they were displayed in iron cages at the four corners of the Alhóndiga de Granaditas as a public warning.

Aldama’s body was initially buried in Chihuahua. After the heads were removed following independence, his skull was eventually transferred via Guanajuato’s San Sebastián church and Mexico City’s Metropolitan Cathedral to the mausoleum of the Columna de la Independencia in 1925, where it rests with those of other independence figures.

== Legacy ==
Aldama is considered a national hero of Mexico. He is commemorated yearly during Mexico's patriotic holidays. Streets, schools, and public monuments across Mexico, specially in Guanajuato bear his name. Some of this include:

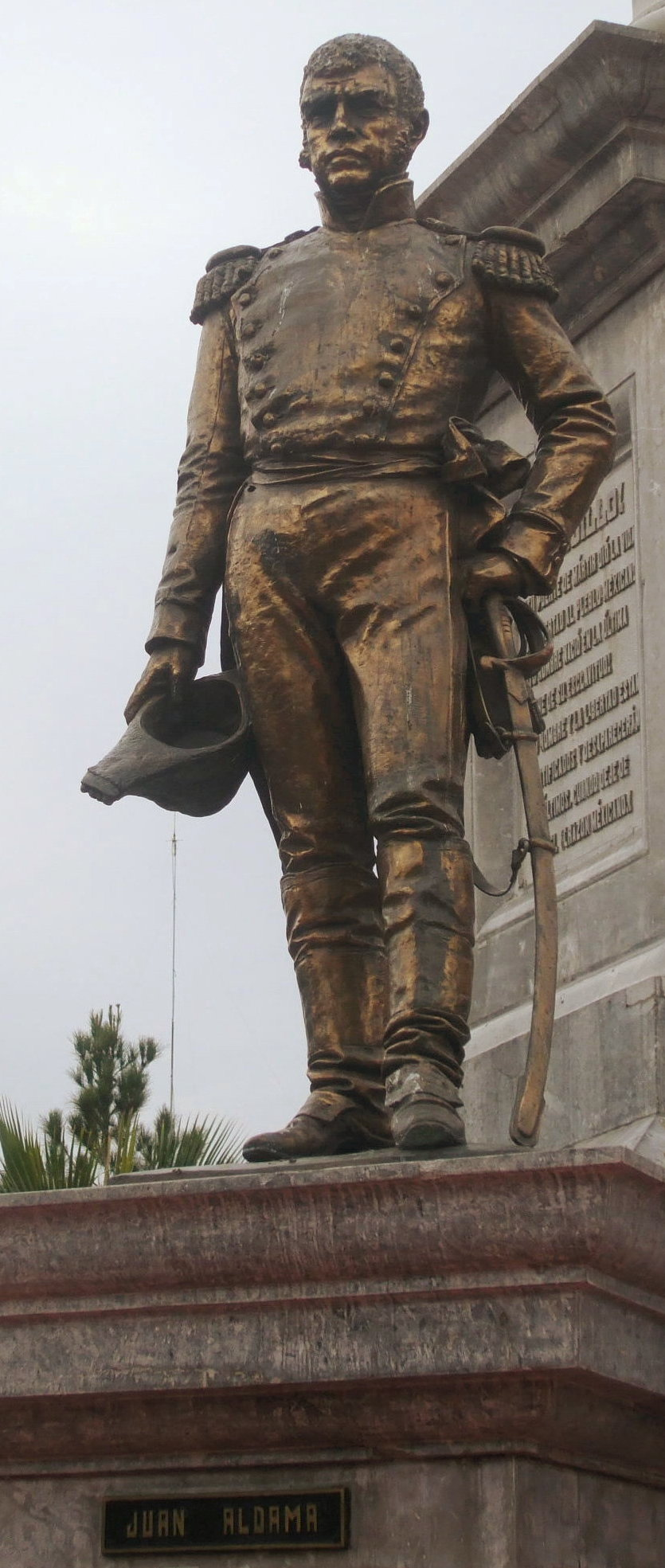
Statue of Aldama in Chihuahua.

- The municipality of Juan Aldama, Zacatecas
- The municipality of Villaldama, Nuevo León.
- The municipality of Aldama, Tamaulipas.
- The municipality of Aldama, Chihuahua.
- The municipality of Villa Aldama, Veracruz.
- The village of Juan Aldama, "El Tigre", Sinaloa outside of Culiacán.
- The street Juan Aldama in Mexicali, Baja California in the Colonia Independencia.
- The city of León de Los Aldamas in Guanajuato and the municipality of Los Aldamas in Nuevo León honor brothers Juan and Ignacio collectively.

== See also ==
- Ignacio Aldama
- Grito de Dolores
- History of Mexico
