= Alhóndiga de Granaditas =

Historical Regional Museum, The Grain Exchange of Granaditas
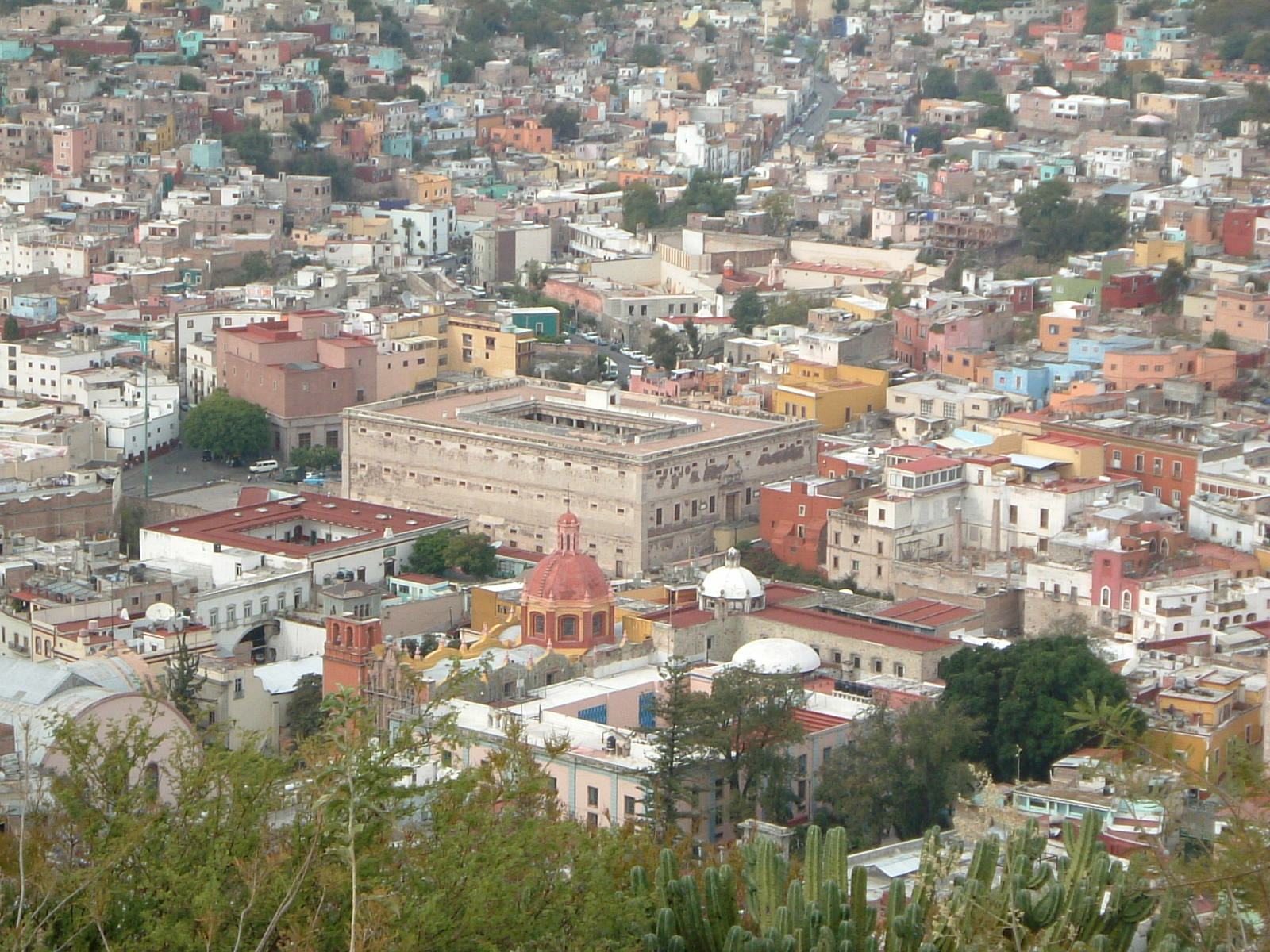

- Location within Mexico
- Established: 1958
- Location: Mendizabal 6, Historic District, Guanajauto, Guanajauto
- Coordinates: 21.0189°N 101.2581°W
- Type: History museum

The Alhóndiga de Granaditas (Regional Museum of Guanajuato) (public grain exchange) is an old grain storage building in Guanajuato City, Mexico. This historic building was created to replace an old grain exchange near the city's river. The name Alhóndiga translates roughly from both Arabic and Spanish as grain market or warehouse. It is equivalent to the regional grain exchange. Its construction lasted from 1798 to 1809, by orders of Juan Antonio de Riaño y Bárcena, a Spaniard who was the quartermaster of the city during the Viceroyalty of New Spain. Miguel Hidalgo y Costilla and his insurgent army stormed the building during the first battle of the Mexican War of Independence, leading to the legend of el Pípila. The building received World Heritage listing as part of the Historic Town of Guanajuato in 1988.

== Architecture ==
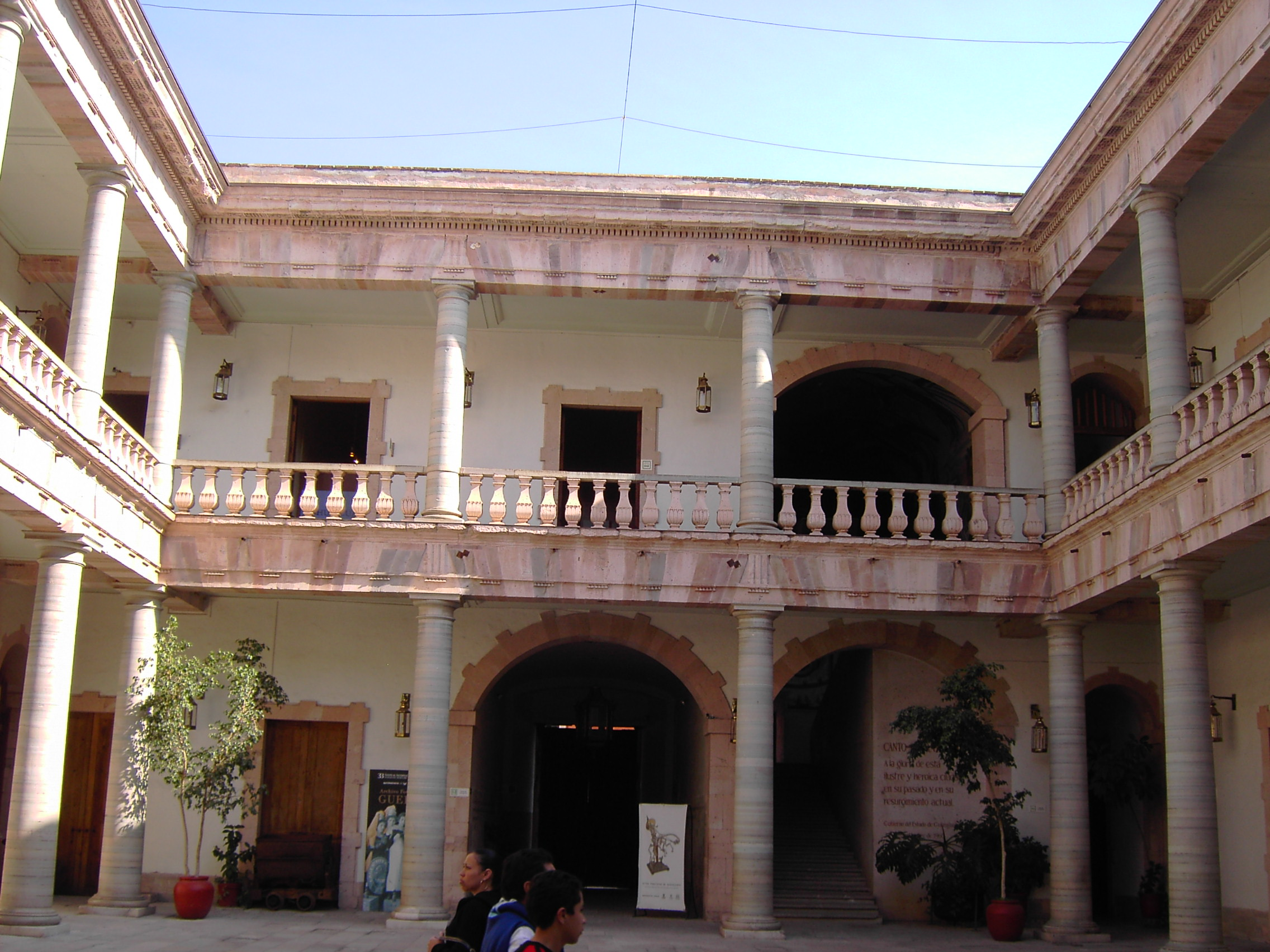
The interior of the Grain Exchange

The Grain Exchange is an example of Neoclassical ideas. The original design was drafted in 1796 by Josė Alejandro Durán y Villaseñor, who was the master of public works. Josė de Mazo y Avilés modified the plans later.

It measures 72 by 68 metres, with a height of 23 metres, and occupies an area of 4,828 square metres. It is constructed on the side of a hill and two of its sides are surrounded by elevations. There are no ornamental facets on the exterior, except for a few windows at the top of each storage room. It has cornices built in a Doric style, constructed with two types of regional stone—reddish and greenish. This gives it a curious appearance, resembling a stronghold or a castle, which it has come to be called by the people of Guanajuato. In the interior, there is a porch that leads to a spacious central patio. The porch contains Tuscan columns and adornments. There are two staircases that lead to the upper floor. The Grain Exchange building has only two access doors, a small one facing the east, adorned by two columns, and a large door of the same basic style, facing the north. The edifice was used for the buying and selling of wheat, corn, and other grains. Prior to the Mexican independence from Spain, it was used as a warehouse, military barracks, and prison. Currently it serves as a regional museum.

== History ==
=== Battle for Grain Exchange at Granaditas ===
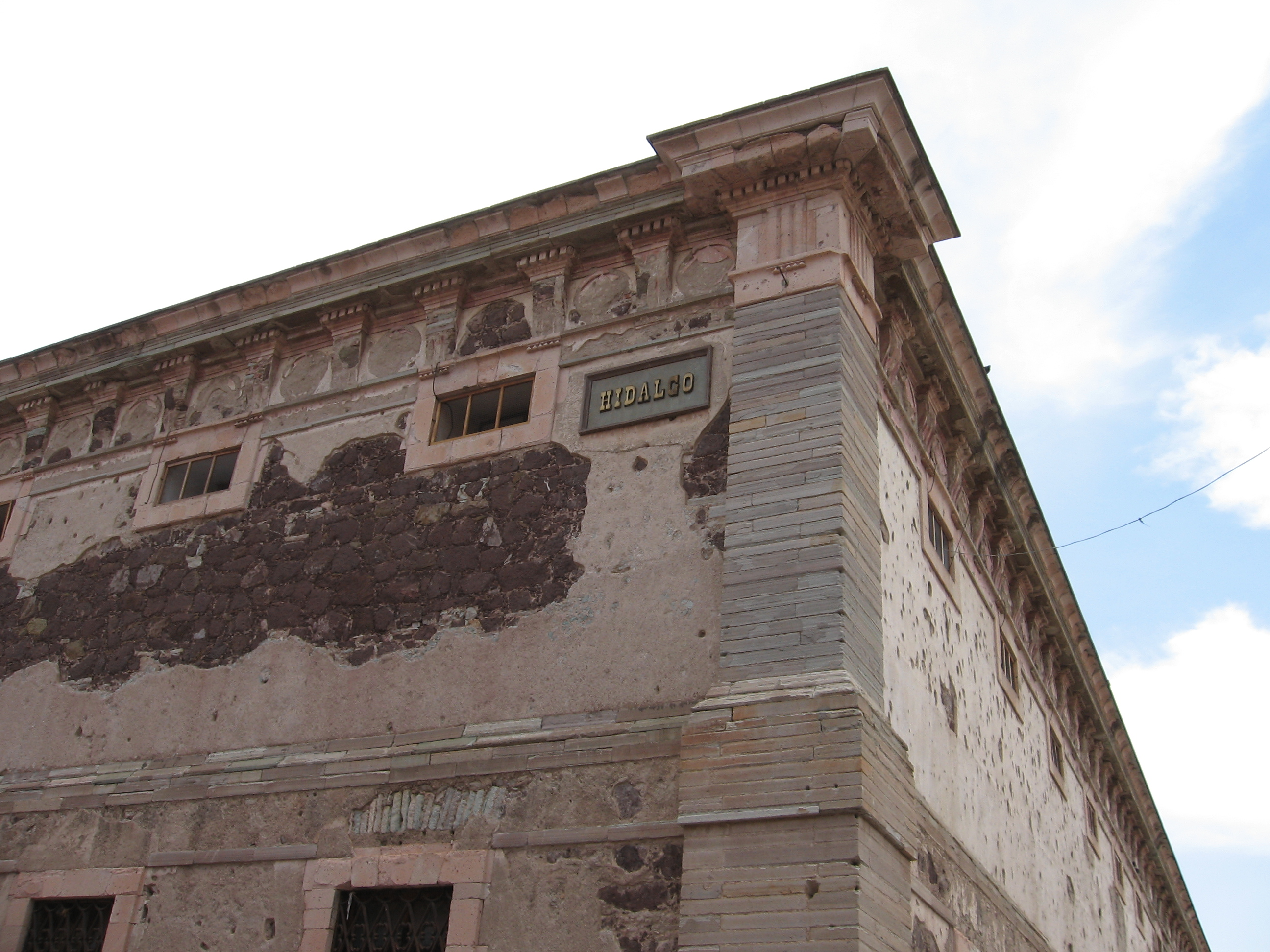
The corner of the Grain Exchange where Hidalgo's head used to hang.

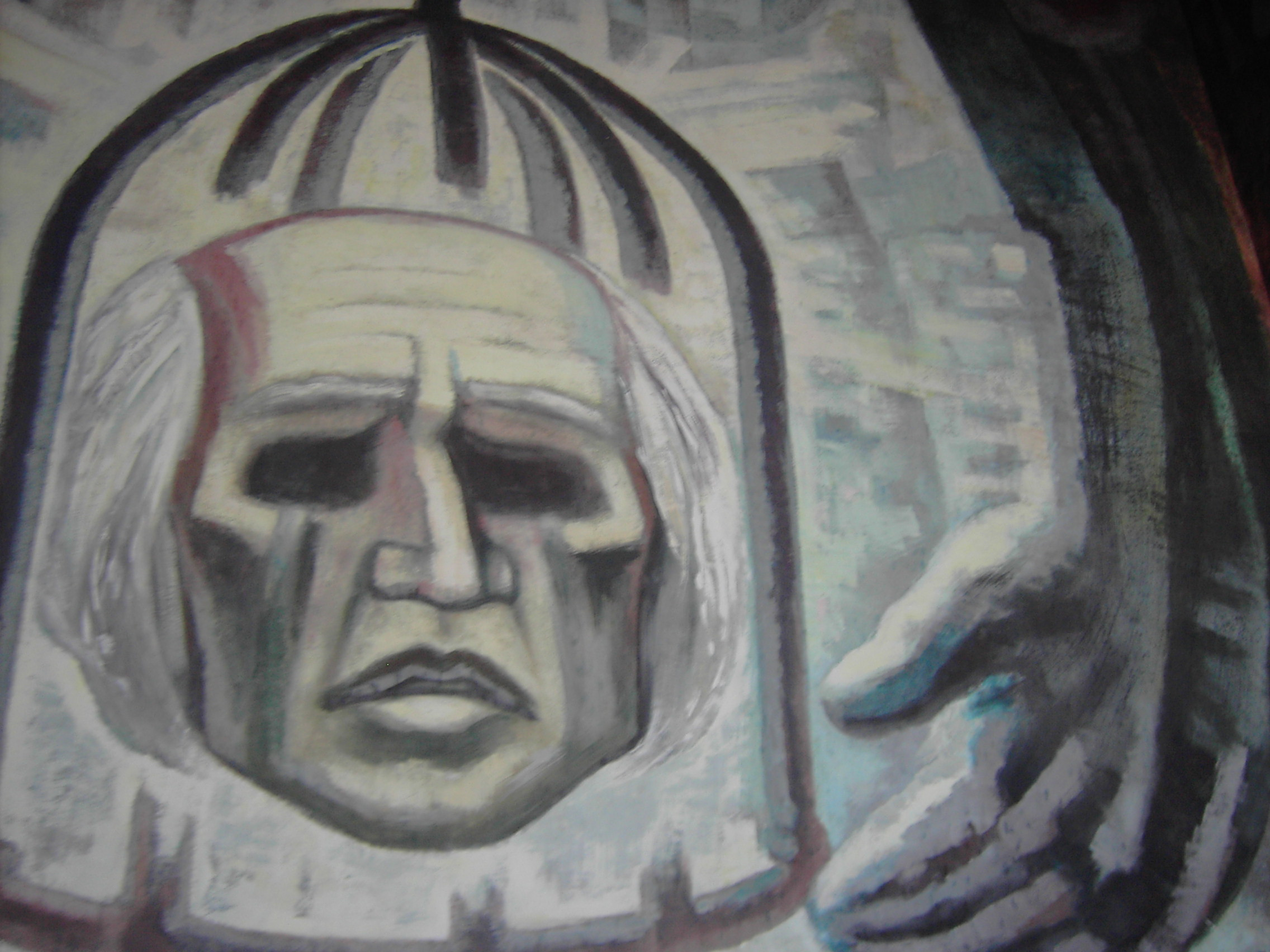
A part of one of the two murals in the Grain Exchange

When Miguel Hidalgo y Costilla's insurgent troops threatened to take over this city during the Mexican War of Independence, Riaño secured himself in the Grain Exchange on 28 September 1810, along with many other Spaniards and some rich criollos. There were about 300 loyalists who took refuge from 20,000 rebels led by Hidalgo. Riaño believed that the strength of the building, its ample supplies and its positioning would make it easy to repel the insurgents' attacks. In addition to the corn the building already held, other provisions and twenty-four women were brought in to "make tortillas."

At first the building held, but soon the insurgents surrounded the building and began throwing rocks. Riaño died in this attack. His death caused "division and discord among the defenders of the Grain Exchange." The insurgents decided to burn down the eastern door to be able to enter and attack those that were inside. According to a popular tradition the man chosen to perform this task was Juan José Martínez "El Pípila", an extraordinarily strong local miner. He is said to have tied a large flat stone to his back to protect himself from the bullet and rock storm expected once he entered. He poured petroleum on the door and lit it using a torch. When the door burnt down, the attackers stormed into the Grain Exchange, led by Martínez. Everyone inside the Grain Exchange was killed and the building sacked. Reportedly, blood stains from the attack could still be seen on the pillars of the building and the main staircase as late as 1906. At the end of the day, hundreds of bodies were buried, and the whole city of Guanajuato pillaged. This event would encourage Hidalgo not to attack Mexico City, afraid his followers would repeat the massacres and looting of Guanajuato.

These first insurgents eventually fell. The four main participants - Hidalgo, Ignacio Allende, Juan Aldama, and José Mariano Jiménez - were shot by Spanish firing squads, and their bodies decapitated. The four heads were hung from the corners of the Grain Exchange, to discourage other independence movements. The heads remained hanging for ten years, until Mexico achieved its independence. They were then taken to Mexico City and eventually put to rest under el Ángel de la Independencia in 1910.

In 1867, during the French Intervention in Mexico, the Emperor Maximilian ordered the Grain Exchange building to be converted into a prison. It remained a prison for nearly a century.

Between 1955 and 1966, artist José Chávez Morado painted murals on the building reflecting the historical significance of the place. In 1958, the Grain Exchange opened officially as a museum.

== Public venue ==
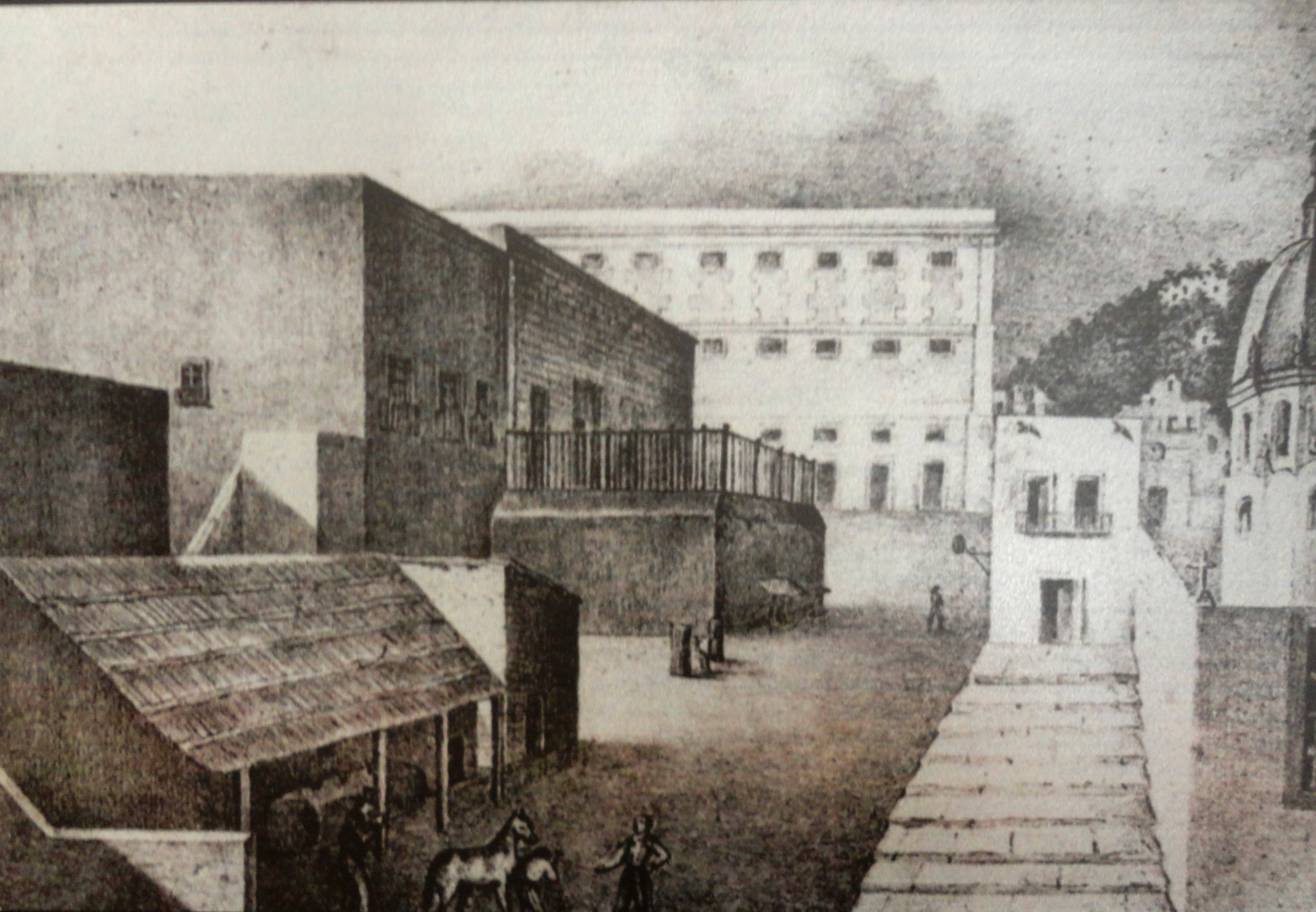
Alhóndiga de Granaditas at the early-19th century

Attached to one side of the Grain Exchange is a large plaza with a set of wide steps that rise to meet the edge of the building. During the annual International Cervantino Festival, this space is converted into a large open air auditorium for live performances. The shows (often music and dance by groups of worldwide acclaim) are free to the general public, with reserved seats directly below the stage.

Inside of the museum are exhibits and art honoring heroes of the Independence. The museum also holds a collection of Pre-Columbian art donated by Morado and his wife in 1975.

== See also ==
- List of buildings in Guanajuato City
