= El Pípila =

Nickname for an insurgent soldier in Mexico

- Pípila's Statue at the Monument to the Heroes of the Independence, Puebla
- Born: Juan José de los Reyes Martínez Amaro; January 3, 1782; San Miguel el Grande, Guanajuato, New Spain
- Died: July 26, 1863 (aged 81); San Miguel de Allende, Guanajuato, Mexico
- Occupations: Miner, Insurgent Fighter
- Known for: Heroic action during Capture of Alhóndiga de Granaditas
- Spouse: Maria Victoriana Bretadillo
- Children: 3
- Military career
- Allegiance: Mexican Insurgency
- Branch: Insurgent Army
- Service years: 1810s
- Rank: Private
- Battles/wars: Mexican War of Independence; Capture of Alhóndiga de Granaditas

El Pípila (Spanish pronunciation: [ˈpipila]) is the nickname of a local hero of the city of Guanajuato in Mexico. His real name was Juan José de los Reyes Martínez Amaro. His nickname, Pípila, is what the Bajío region calls a turkey; it is said his nickname stands for his freckled face (similar to that of a turkey egg), his peculiar walk, or his laughter resembling the bird's peculiar gargle.

== Early life ==
childhood home of Juan Jose Pípila in San Miguel, Guanajuato

Pípila was a miner. He came from the nearby town of San Miguel el Grande, now San Miguel de Allende, and worked in one of the first mines in Guanajuato City, the Mellado mine, opened in 1558. The City of Guanajuato was the largest exporter of silver in the world at the end of the 18th century. Pipila began work as a Barretero, "a traditional miner who uses a crowbar, pickaxe, or wedge to break rock or drill holes for explosives". Eventually, Pipila began to lead other groups of Barreteros in the Guanajuato City Mine.

== War of Independence ==
Pípila became famous for an act of heroism near the very beginning of the Mexican War of Independence, on 28 September 1810. The insurrection had begun in the nearby town of Dolores, led by Miguel Hidalgo, a criollo priest born in Pénjamo. He soon moved to the city of Guanajuato, Guanajuato, where the Spanish barricaded themselves– along with plenty of silver and other riches– in a grain warehouse known as the Alhóndiga de Granaditas. The granary was a stone fortress with high stone walls, but its wooden door proved to be a shortcoming.

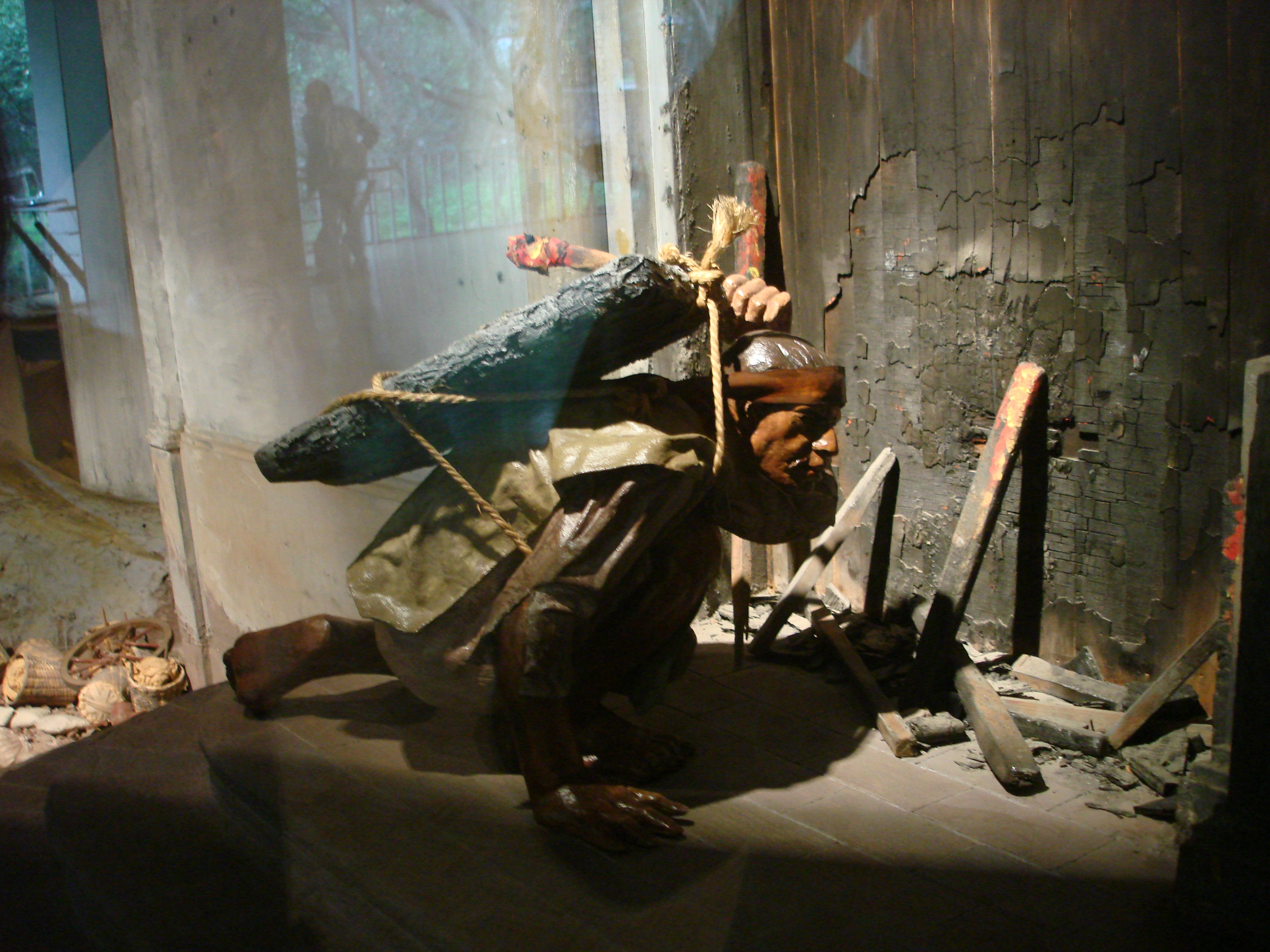
Figure depicting Pípila's heroic action at Guanajuato

The insurgents attacked but were repulsed by Spanish musketeers firing from their position high atop the grain tower. Just when things were becoming desperate, Pipila, with a long, flat stone tied to his back to protect him from the muskets of the Spanish troops, Pípila carried tar and a torch to the door of the Alhóndiga and set it on fire. Once the door of the Alhóndiga was breached, the outcome was certain, since the insurgents severely outnumbered the Spaniards. They massacred everyone inside, earning Guanajuato the title of birthplace of Mexican Independence. Some accounts say that Pípila was not alone but went accompanied by other indigenous miners ready to fight for their freedom from the Spanish, but as the story is told today in Guanajuato, Pípila stood alone to break through the door.

== Monument ==
Monument to El Pípila
- Front view of the statue
- Interactive map of Monument to El Pípila
- Location: Cerro de San Miguel, Guanajuato City, Mexico
- Coordinates: 21.0144°N 101.2544°W
- Designer: Juan Fernando Olaguíbel
- Type: Statue
- Material: Sandstone, Cantera
- Height: 20 metres (66 ft)
- Beginning date: 1939
- Opening date: 5 February 1940

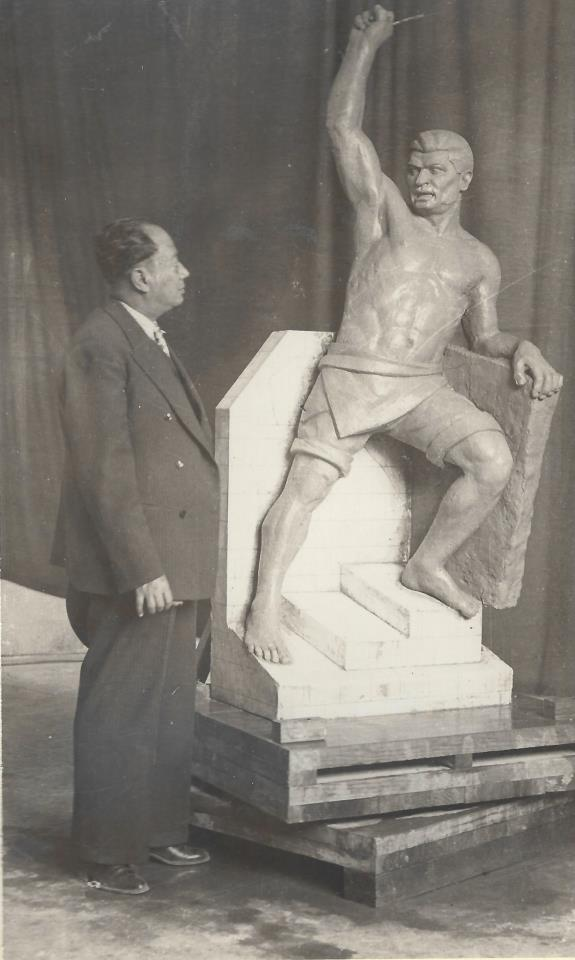
Interm Governor of the State Rafael Rangel Hurtado inspecting a preliminary model of the proposed monument, c. 1938.

Perched on the crest of Cerro de San Miguel, this giant monument honors Juan José de los Reyes Martínez Amaro, a local miner known as "El Pípila." The statue shows him charging forward with a heavy stone slab on his back for protection and a blazing beacon in his right hand. This flame is proudly known as the "Torch of Liberty." Opened on February 5, 1940, the towering landmark weighs a massive 800 tons. It stands as a permanent symbol of courage for the people of Guanajuato. The monument was designed by Mexican sculptor Juan Fernando Olaguíbel. He led a team of about one hundred craftsmen who worked for a year and a half to finish it.

Visitors can walk up one of several stairways to the top of the hill or ride the funicular located just behind Teatro Juárez. There are a series of broad stone plazas at the base of the monument.

Visitors can step inside the statue and climb a staircase up to an enclosed glass deck near the hero's shoulder. Near the bottom, the statue features a famous, inspiring quote dated September 1939: "Aún hay otras Alhóndigas por incendiar" ("There are still other Alhóndigas to burn"). This message reminds everyone that the fight for freedom never truly ends. Visitors can return to town by following the terraced stone platforms to one of several winding stone staircases that afford gorgeous views of the valley, framed by old-growth trees and blooming hedges.

The Pípila Monument is one of the city's most prominent landmarks and is a heavily transited tourist area known mostly for the Panoramic View and sweeping monument that can be seen from all over the city below. The Monument has many gift shops and small restaurants located adjacent to the monument.

== Gallery ==
Panorama of Guanajuato City taken from the plaza of the Monument
Monument to El Pípila
The Base of the Monument

The Monument at night

View of the monument from the Valley below

Monument (2025)

Monument during renovation (2018)

Plaque behind the Monument

1960 National Lottery Ticket depicting El Pipila.

== See also ==
- Capture of Alhóndiga de Granaditas
