= Battle of Monte de las Cruces =

Battle of the early Mexican War of Independence

Coordinates: 19°19′46″N 99°18′59″W

- Part of the Mexican War of Independence
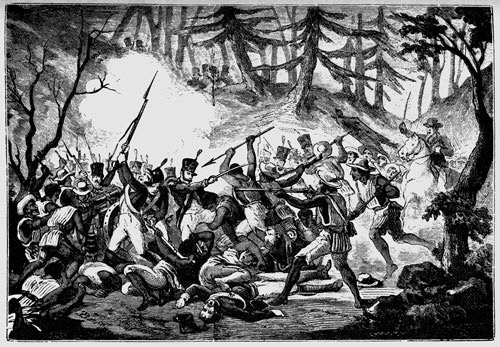
Date	30 October 1810
Location	Ocoyoacac, New Spain
Result	Tactical insurgent victory: Hidalgo renounces to continue towards Mexico City

Belligerents
Mexican Insurgents	Kingdom of Spain and the Indies (the Spains); New Spain

Commanders and leaders
Miguel Hidalgo y Costilla; Ignacio Allende; Juan Aldama; Mariano Abasolo	Torcuato Trujillo; Agustin Iturbide

Units involved
	Royalist Army

Strength
60,000 – 80,000 irregulars and militias	1,400 – 7,000 militias

Casualties and losses
3,000 – 5,000	1,000 – 2,500

The Battle of Monte de las Cruces was one of the pivotal battles of the early Mexican War of Independence, in October 1810.

It was fought between the insurgent troops of Miguel Hidalgo y Costilla and Ignacio Allende against the New Spain royalist troops of Lt Colonel Torcuato Trujillo, in the Sierra de las Cruces mountains between Toluca and Mexico City. The battle marks the furthest advance of the first rebel campaign, before Hidalgo decided to retreat towards Guadalajara, and not attack Mexico City, despite the fact that he won the battle, but at high cost. The battlefield is now located in the La Marquesa National Park, which is officially called the Miguel Hidalgo National Park in honor of the event.

== Grito de Dolores and march to the Sierra de las Cruces ==
The battle marks the end of the first offensive in the Mexican War of Independence, which began with the Grito de Dolores. Father Miguel Hidalgo y Costilla was the parish priest of Dolores, Guanajuato, involved with one of a number of conspiracies against the colonial government in the early 19th century. A particular conspiracy was called the Conspiracy of Querétaro. The plot, which was supposed to be launched in December 1810, was discovered. Fearing his arrest, Hidalgo decided to begin the insurrection early by calling upon parishioners to rise up against the colonial government. The Grito was a call to arms to better the lives of Mexicans, and it immediately attracted the support of the lower classes in the town of Dolores and the Bajío region. One reason for this was that Hidalgo had credibility among the lower classes, despite being an upper class Creole, due to his work to give the poor and indigenous peoples more economic opportunities.

This made Hidalgo leader of the insurgent movement instead of follow conspirator Ignacio Allende, despite Allende's training as a military commander. The insurgent army was really an untrained mob with little or no discipline. This army passed through the Bajio region of what is now state of Guanajuato, capturing cities such as San Miguel el Grande, Celaya and Irapuato with little resistance. All the while, more people joined the ranks of the insurgents, until upon leaving Celaya, Hidalgo had about 80,000 men. The response to Hidalgo's call was so quick that royal authorities could not react at first. Hidalgo's army then passed through Querétaro and into what is now the state of Mexico, heading south and east towards Mexico City, with still more volunteers joining along the way. Despite the early success, there were serious problems with the army. Many were armed only with primitive weapons such as bows and arrows but the bigger concern for Ignacio Allende was the pillaging, looting and wanton violence that followed the taking of the Bajio cities.

== The battle ==
Only a month and a half after the Grito de Dolores, Hidalgo's army entered the Toluca Valley on its way to Mexico City. The insurgents' rampage through Guanajuato terrified the elite in New Spain and even many of the lower classes of the more conservative valleys of Toluca and Mexico. The city of Toluca called upon viceregal authorities for help, which came in the form of contingent of royalist forces under the command of General Torcuato Trujillo.

Trujillo's royalist army took up strategic positions in the Sierra de las Cruces, which separate Toluca from Mexico City. These mountains are filled with steep valleys and thick forests. This allowed for advantages against the numerous insurgent army, such as the ability to place cannons above oncoming troops. It also allowed Trujillo to protect the road to Mexico City with troops on both sides. Command of insurgent forces was put directly under Ignacio Allende, in order to take advantage of his military capabilities.

The battlefield is a site called Los Llanos de Salazar in the current municipality of Ocoyoacac, where more than 90,000 insurgent troops fought. The army was divided into three flanks. One was composed of 30,000 men who took the Temoaya/Jiquipilco road on the west side. Another flank approached the battlefield from the south via Mexicaltzingo and the main troops commanded by Allende and Hidalgo between the two. The strategy was to encircle Trujillo's troops.

The battle began at about 8 a.m. on 30 October 1810 in a cold pine forest on rugged territory. The battle had three phases, corresponding to the three offensives of the insurgent army against royalist positions. The first two were rebuffed, but the insurgents managed to surround the royalists. Before the third try, Hidalgo sent emissaries to try to get the royalist to surrender but the head of the royalist army responded by killing the emissaries. This angered insurgent troops.

The third offensive was successful and cleared the road for the advance to Mexico City. However, the insurgent army experienced heavy losses, with 2,000 troops dead and many more wounded. This was due to the lack of training of insurgent troops as well as the lack of modern weapons.

== Retreat from Mexico City ==
After the battle, Hidalgo's troops advanced as far as Cuajimalpa, which today is just within the Federal District of Mexico City. Meanwhile, Hidalgo also sent word that he wanted to speak to the viceroy, Francisco Javier Venegas. However, at this point, Hidalgo decided not to press forward to Mexico City and instead retreat towards Guadalajara. The true reason for this decision is not known but a number of speculations have been offered.

One story is that before knowing if the viceroy had received his request for a meeting, Hidalgo received word that Calleja was already en route with another army. Hidalgo's troops had sustained heavy casualties during Las Cruces and Hidalgo feared that he could not withstand another royalist assault. Another view is that Hidalgo was a priest, not a military man and the bloodshed of that battle horrified him. He did not want to see it, nor the riots of the Bajio cities repeated in Mexico City.

One other explanation is that about 40,000 of Hidalgo's volunteer troops abandoned the effort after the battle with efforts to recruit more from the local area failing and there was disagreement among the ranks and leadership as to what to do next.

The battle crippled the royalist army but did not completely destroy it. It was able to regroup and pursue a counteroffensive as Hidalgo retreated.

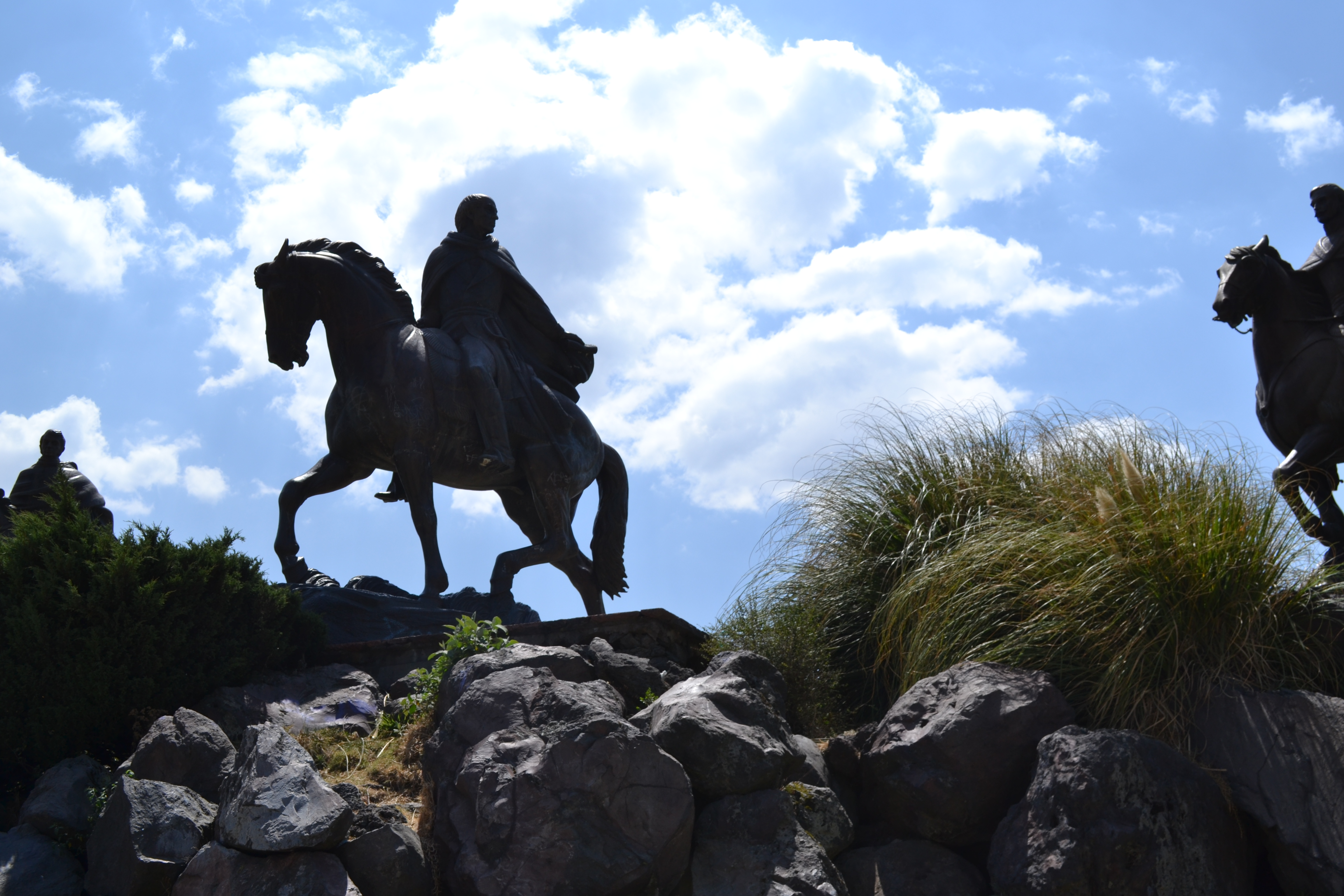
Bronze equestrian sculptures at the battlefield site, in La Marquesa National Park.

== The site today ==
The battlefield site is located in the present day La Marquesa National Park (officially Miguel Hidalgo National Park), in the Los Llanos de Salazar area within the municipality of Ocoyoacac, Mexico state. The battlefield is marked by an obelisk monument constructed in the 1960s to memorialize the event, and which also proclaims Hidalgo as the first "caudillo" of Mexican Independence. A second monument at the battlefield has huge bronze equestrian sculptures of Hidalgo, Allende, and José Mariano Jiménez on horseback.

The road that the insurgents fought to clear has since been replaced by a modern highway, linking Mexico City and Toluca. The remains of the original road are hardly noticeable from the highway. Los Llanos de Salazar is filled with food stands and recreational facilities, including in the battlefield area. The businesses crowd around the monuments, and graffiti mars them.

Cuajimalpa, where Hidalgo's troops turned around, also has monuments to the insurgent army. There is a bust of Hidalgo in the community of San Lorenzo Acopilco, which marks the point of the insurgent army's farthest advance. Local legend states that a priest blessed the waters of a spring near here.
