= Ignacio Allende =

Mexican independence leader

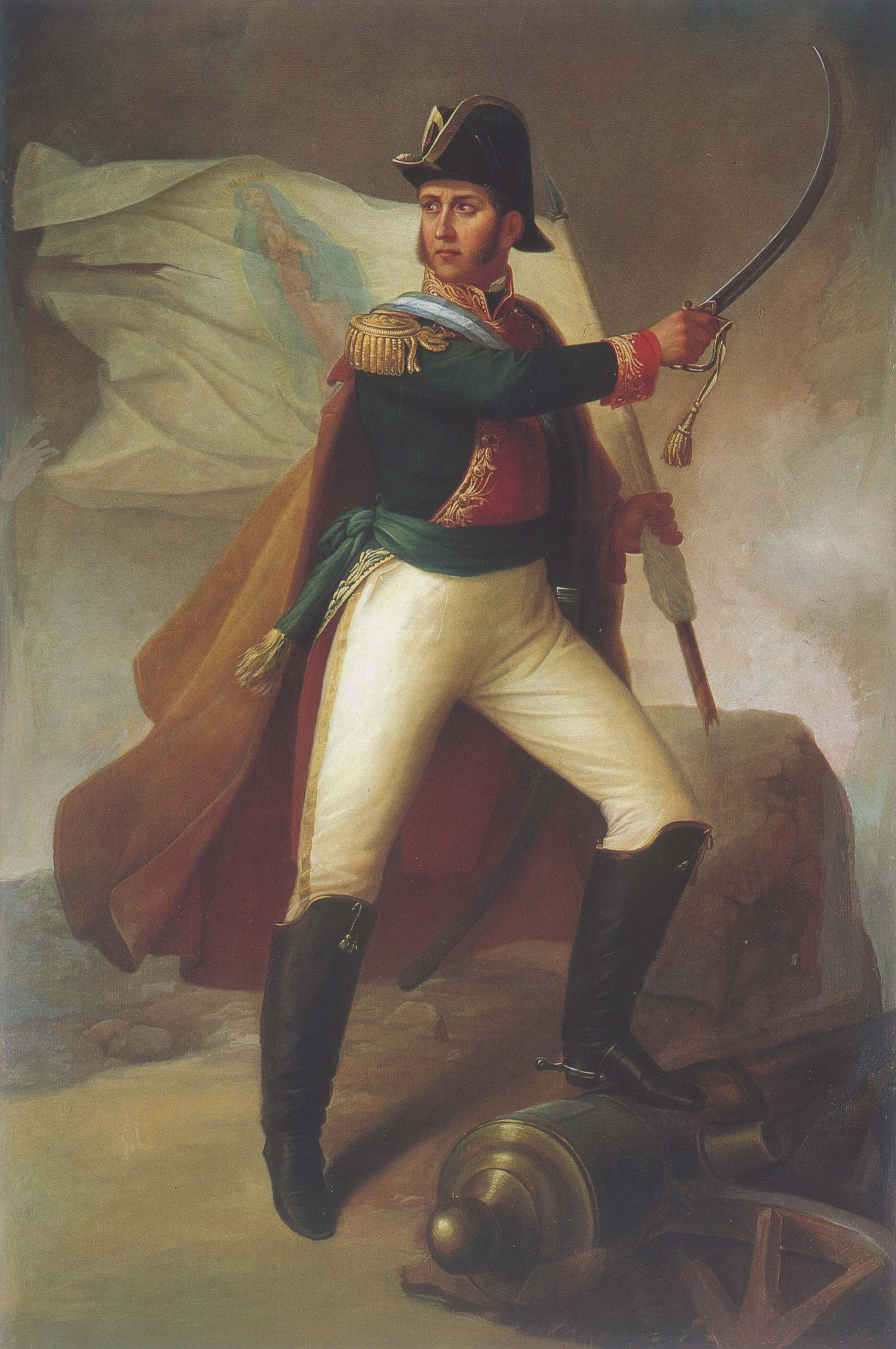
- Portrait by Ramón Pérez, 1865
- Born: January 21, 1769; San Miguel el Grande, Viceroyalty of New Spain (now San Miguel de Allende, Guanajuato, Mexico)
- Died: June 26, 1811 (aged 42); Chihuahua, Nueva Vizcaya, Viceroyalty of New Spain (now Chihuahua, Mexico)
- Military career
- Allegiance: Kingdom of Spain; Mexican Insurgency
- Service years: 1802–1811
- Rank: Captain (Spain); Lieutenant General (Insurgency)
- Conflicts: Mexican War of Independence; Capture of Alhóndiga de Granaditas; Battle of Monte de las Cruces; Battle of Calderón Bridge

Ignacio José de Allende y Unzaga (US: /ɑːˈjɛndeɪ, -di/, UK: /æˈ-, aɪˈɛn-/, Spanish: [iɣˈnasjo aˈʝende]; January 21, 1769 – June 26, 1811), commonly known as Ignacio Allende, was a captain of the Spanish Army in New Spain who came to sympathize with the Mexican independence movement. He attended the secret meetings organized by Josefa Ortiz de Domínguez, where the possibility of an independent Mexico was discussed. He fought along with Miguel Hidalgo y Costilla in the first stage of the struggle, eventually succeeding him in leadership of the rebellion. Allende was captured by Spanish colonial authorities while he was in Coahuila and executed for treason in Chihuahua.

== Biography ==
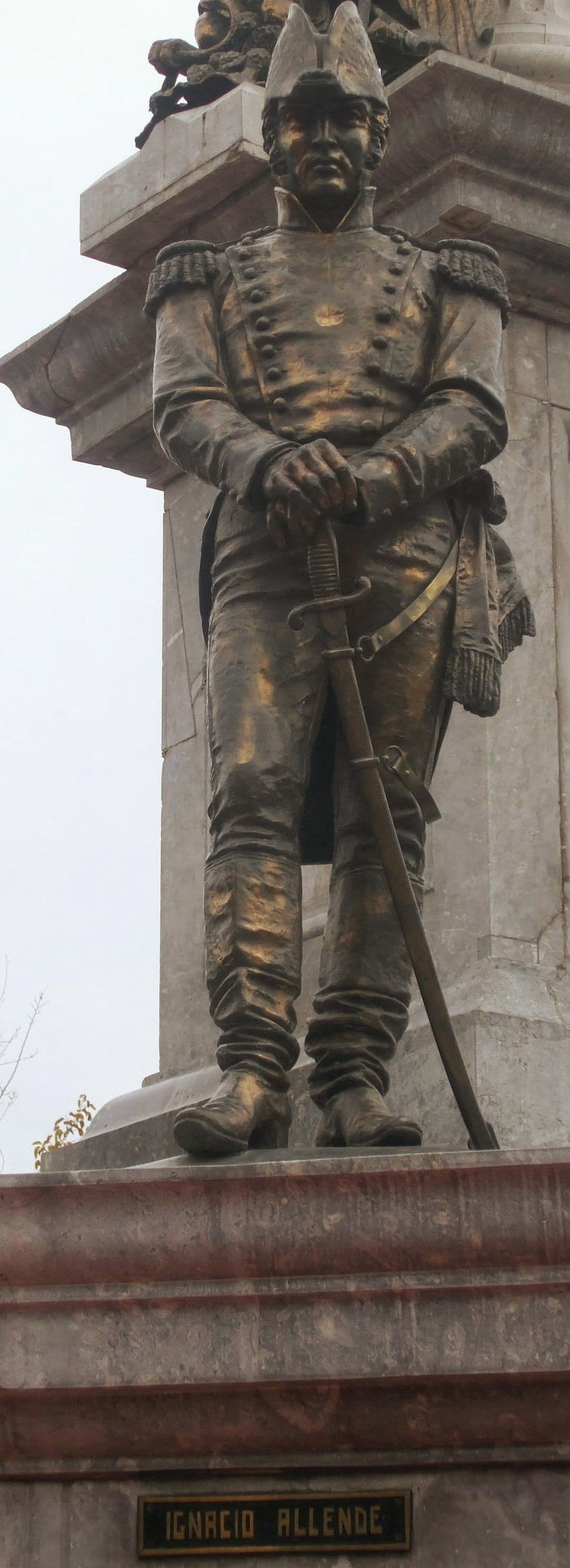
Allende statue in Chihuahua City, Chihuahua.

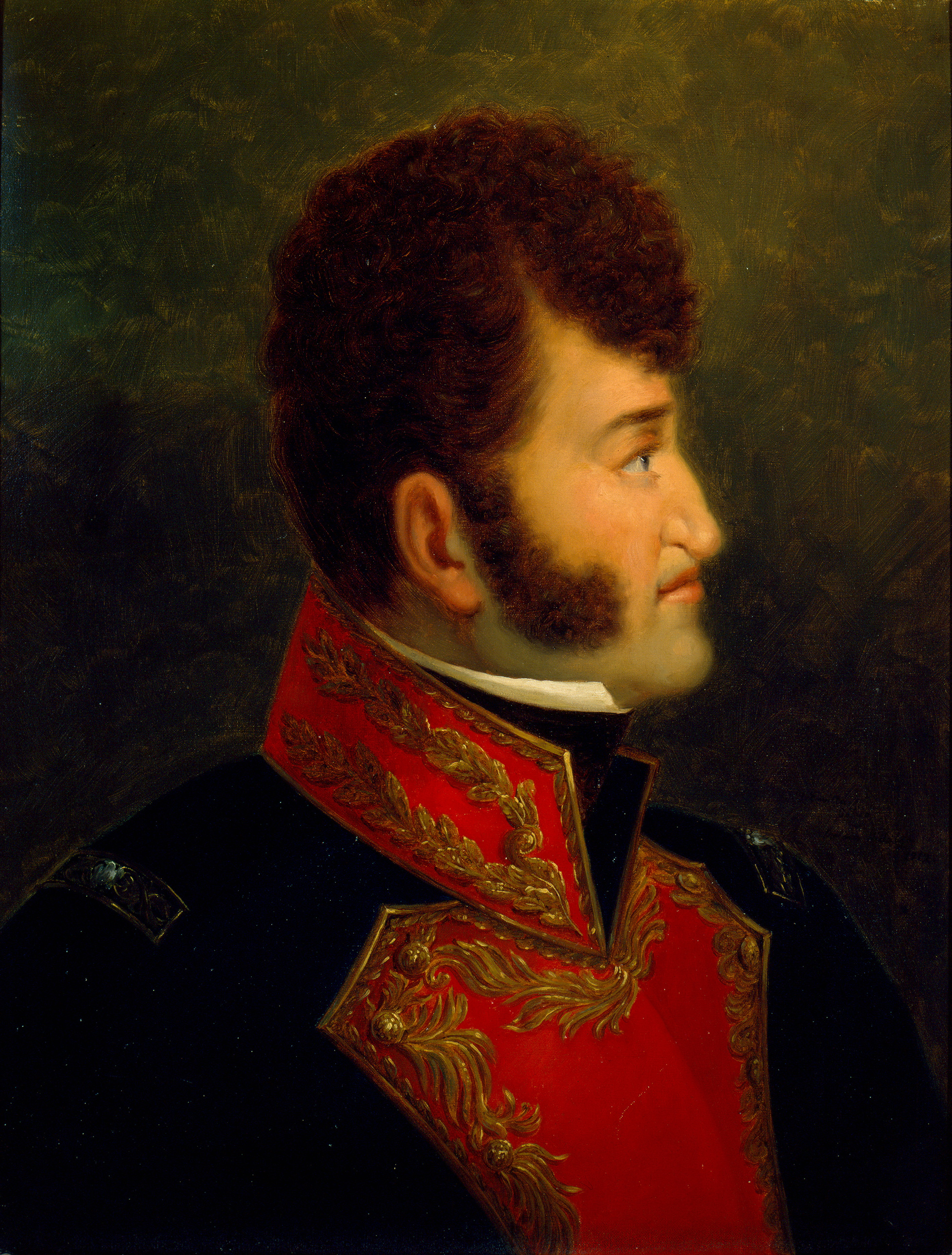
Posthumous portrait of Ignacio Allende (1769–1811).

Allende was born on January 21, 1769, to a wealthy Spanish criollo family in San Miguel el Grande in Guanajuato, Mexico. His father was Domingo Narciso de Allende y Ayerdi from Spain and a wealthy estate owner and trader.

In 1802, he joined the army, serving under general Félix María Calleja del Rey. In 1806, he started to favor the possibility of independence from Spain. His attendance at a conspiratorial meeting in Valladolid (today Morelia) was discovered, in 1809, by the Spanish and went unsanctioned. Regardless, Allende kept supporting the underground independence movement. He was eventually invited by the mayor of Querétaro, Miguel Domínguez and his wife Josefa Ortíz de Domínguez to discuss further plans for independence at their home. It was during one of these meetings where Allende met Miguel Hidalgo y Costilla and his captain Juan Aldama.

Originally, the independence movement was to be led jointly by Allende and Aldama. A change of plans prompted by the discovery of the conspiracy forced Hidalgo to start the rebellion earlier than agreed. The "Grito de Dolores" uttered by Hidalgo signaled the beginning of the revolution, after which the conspirators rallied behind him. The rebel army quickly captured the town of Dolores and marched towards San Miguel el Grande, where Allende obtained the support of his cavalry regiment. On September 22, 1810, Hidalgo y Costilla was officially made captain general of the Revolutionary army while Allende was made lieutenant general. After the famous capture of the Alhóndiga de Granaditas, in Guanajuato, and his victory in the Battle of Monte de las Cruces Allende suggested Hidalgo march toward Mexico City and capture it. As a consequence of the rebels' defeat in the Battle of Calderón Bridge, the leadership of the Revolutionary army demanded the replacement of Hidalgo as their leader. Allende took this new responsibility and, with a decimated army, he decided to march north to the United States, with the goal of making connections with those in the United States for support. The rebels, however, were ambushed at the Wells of Baján due to the betrayal of Ignacio Elizondo, leading to the capture of Allende, Hidalgo, and several other commanders. Allende's illegitimate child Indalecio was killed during this ambush.

Allende was taken to the city of Chihuahua where he was tried for insubordination and imprisoned. He was informed of 2,000 Americans located near San Antonio de Bexar and asked for a meeting with the viceroy in order to contemplate a joint solution in defending a potential American invasion. His request was denied and was executed by firing squad on June 26, 1811. His body was decapitated and his head taken to the Alhóndiga de Granaditas where it was shown to the public inside a cage hung from one corner of the building. In 1824 his remains were buried in the vault reserved for the viceroys and presidents in the cathedral of Mexico. His remains were moved in 1925 to the Independence Column in Mexico City.

== Legacy ==
Allende is a national hero of Mexico. Places named in his honor include the municipal district and city of San Miguel de Allende in the state of Guanajuato, the municipal district of Allende, Chihuahua, the municipality of Talpa de Allende in Jalisco, Allende, Nuevo León, Allende, Coahuila, Ignacio Allende, Durango, and Allende metro station, in Mexico City.

== See also ==
- History of Mexico
