= Grito de Dolores =

Call to arms triggering the Mexican War of Independence

Cry of Dolores
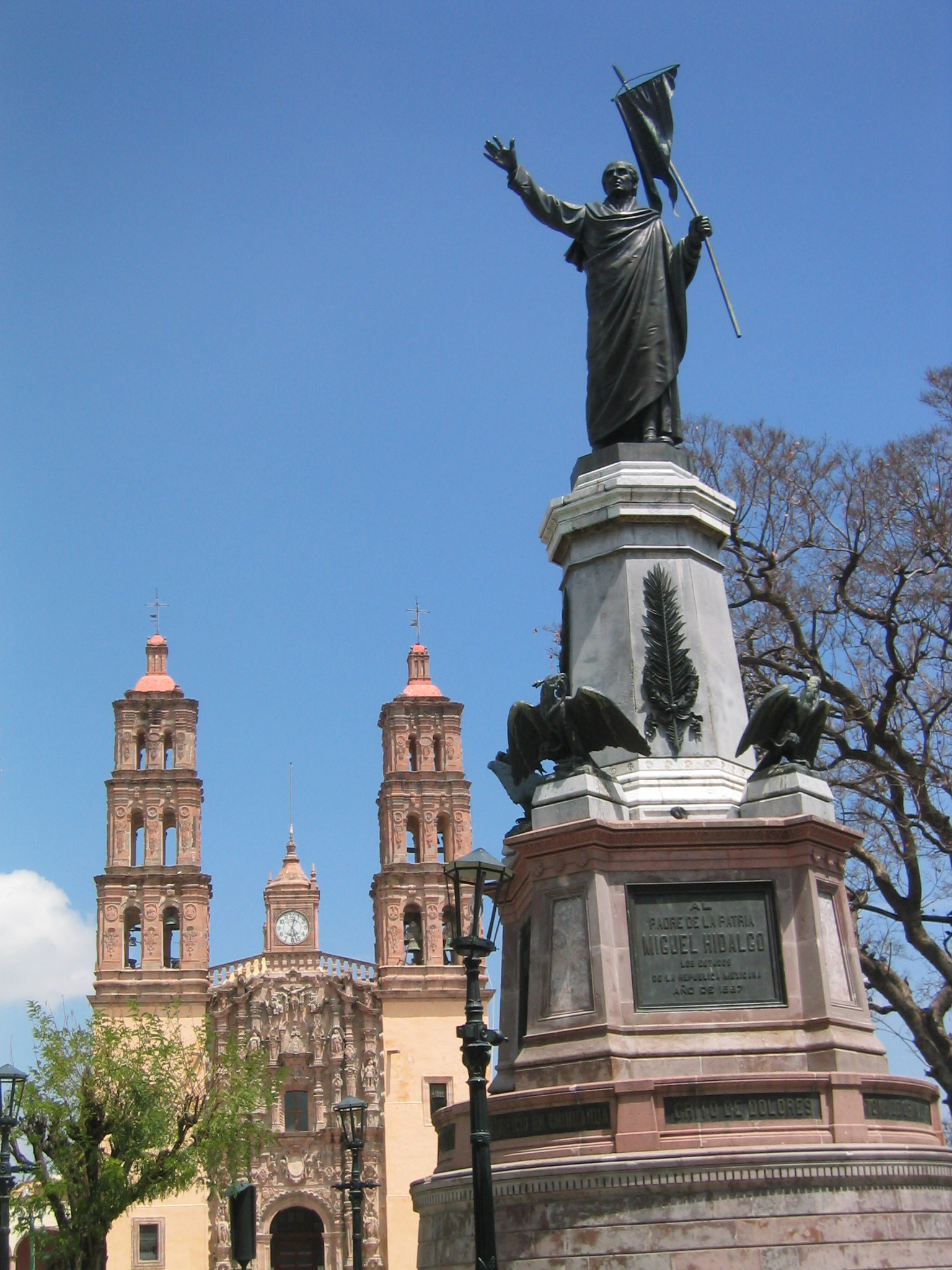
- A statue of Miguel Hidalgo y Costilla in front of the church in Dolores Hidalgo, Guanajuato
- Observed by: Mexico
- Significance: Commemorates the start of the Mexican War of Independence, by repeating the words of Miguel Hidalgo y Costilla in the early morning of 16 September 1810
- Date: 16 September
- Next time: 16 September 2026
- Frequency: Annual

The Cry of Dolores (Note: As a common noun, dolores means 'pains' or 'sorrows' in Spanish; in this context, however, Dolores is a place name. Overliteral translations such as 'shout of pains', sometimes made by machine translation software, are therefore incorrect.) (Spanish: Grito de Dolores) occurred in Dolores, Mexico, on 16 September 1810, when Roman Catholic priest Miguel Hidalgo y Costilla rang his church bell and gave the call to arms that triggered the Mexican War of Independence. The Cry of Dolores is most commonly known by the locals as El Grito de Independencia (The Independence Cry).

Every year on the eve of Independence Day, the president of Mexico re-enacts the cry from the balcony of the National Palace in Mexico City while ringing the same bell Hidalgo used in 1810. During the patriotic speech, the president calls out the names of the fallen heroes who died during the War of Independence and ends the speech by shouting "¡Viva México!" three times, followed by the Mexican National Anthem.

== History ==
In the 1810s, what would become Mexico was still New Spain, part of the Spanish crown. Following Napoleon's overthrow of the Spanish branch of the Bourbon monarchy in 1808, Spain's American possessions rose in rebellion, refusing to accept Napoleon's brother, Joseph Bonaparte, as king. In New Spain, the criollo leadership attempted to set a course of autonomy in support of the legitimate heir to the throne, Ferdinand VII, but the peninsular elite, fearing the loss of the colony, carried out a coup, also in the name of Ferdinand. Almost immediately, groups of creoles formed various plots around the viceroyalty, including in Querétaro, of which Father Hidalgo became a part.

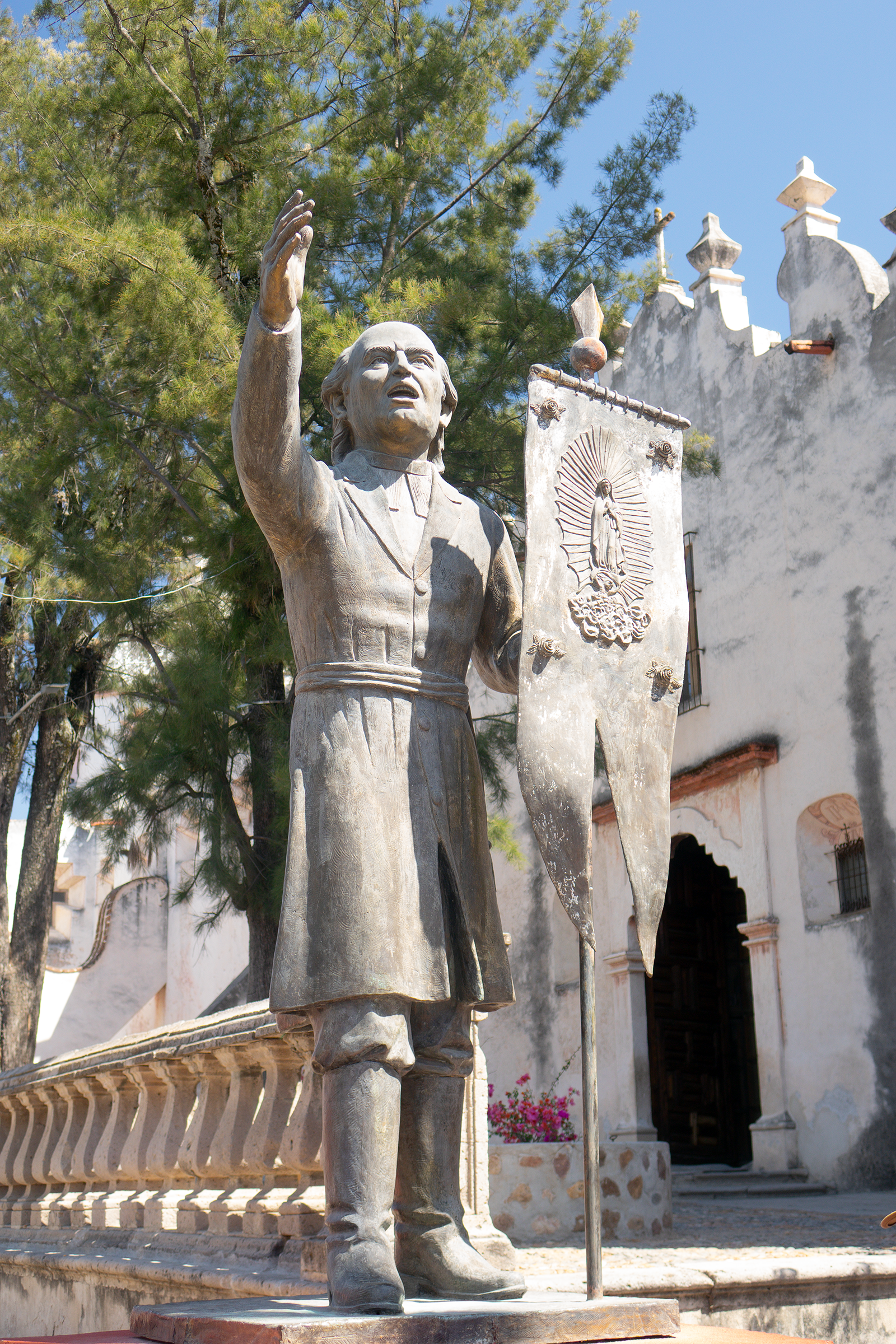
Father Miguel Hidalgo y Costilla with the movement's banner; statue in Atotonilco

When the plot was discovered in early September 1810, some plotters decided to proceed with the uprising. Around 2:30 am on 16 September 1810, Hidalgo ordered the church bells to be rung and gathered his congregation. Flanked by Ignacio Allende and Juan Aldama, he addressed the people in front of his church, urging them to revolt. His speech became known as the "Cry of Dolores".

The liberated country adopted Mexico as its official name. Mexico's independence from Spain took a decade of war. Independence was achieved by the Declaration of Independence of the Mexican Empire 11 years and 12 days later, on 28 September 1821. However, Hidalgo is credited as being the "father of his country".

=== Exact words and meaning ===
Scholars have not been able to reach a consensus on the exact words Miguel Hidalgo said at the time. Michael Meyer has noted:

The exact words of this most famous of all Mexican speeches are not known, or, rather, they are reproduced in almost as many variations as there are historians to reproduce them.

Meyer also argues that:

...the essential spirit of the message is... "My children: a new dispensation comes to us today. Will you receive it? Will you free yourselves? Will you recover the lands stolen three hundred years ago from your forefathers by the hated Spaniards? We must act at once... Will you defend your religion and your rights as true patriots? Long live Our Lady of Guadalupe! Death to bad government! Death to the Gachupines!"

In contrast, William F. Cloud divides the sentiments above between Hidalgo and the crowd:

[Hidalgo] told them that the time for action on their part had now come. When he asked, "Will you be slaves of Napoleon, or will you as patriots defend your religion, your hearths, and your rights?" there was a unanimous cry, "We will defend to the utmost! Long live religion; long live our most holy mother of Guadalupe! Long live America! Death to bad government, and death to the Gachupines!"

Many believe that Hidalgo's Grito condemned the notion of monarchy and criticized the current social order in detail. However, his opposition targeted Spain and its viceroy in Mexico: that is, not against the monarchy in general but against "bad government". The Grito also emphasized loyalty to the Catholic religion, a sentiment with which both Mexican-born Criollos and Peninsulares (native Spaniards) could sympathize. However, the strong anti-Spanish cry of "Death to Gachupines" (Gachupines being a slur given to Peninsulares) would have shocked Mexico's elites.

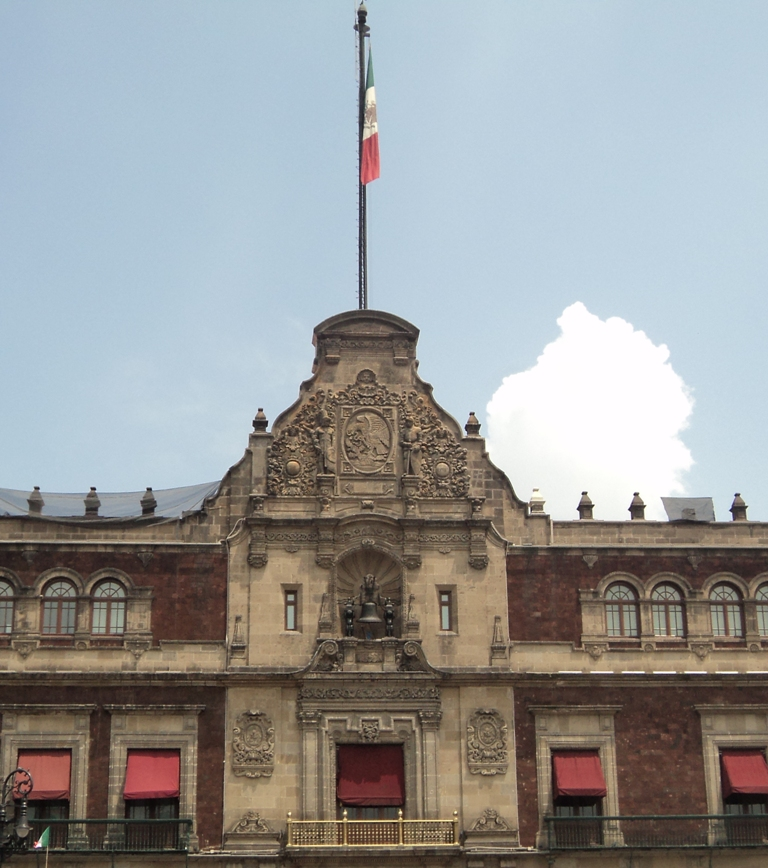
Close-up of the balcony where the president of Mexico gives the annual 'Grito de Dolores' on Independence Day

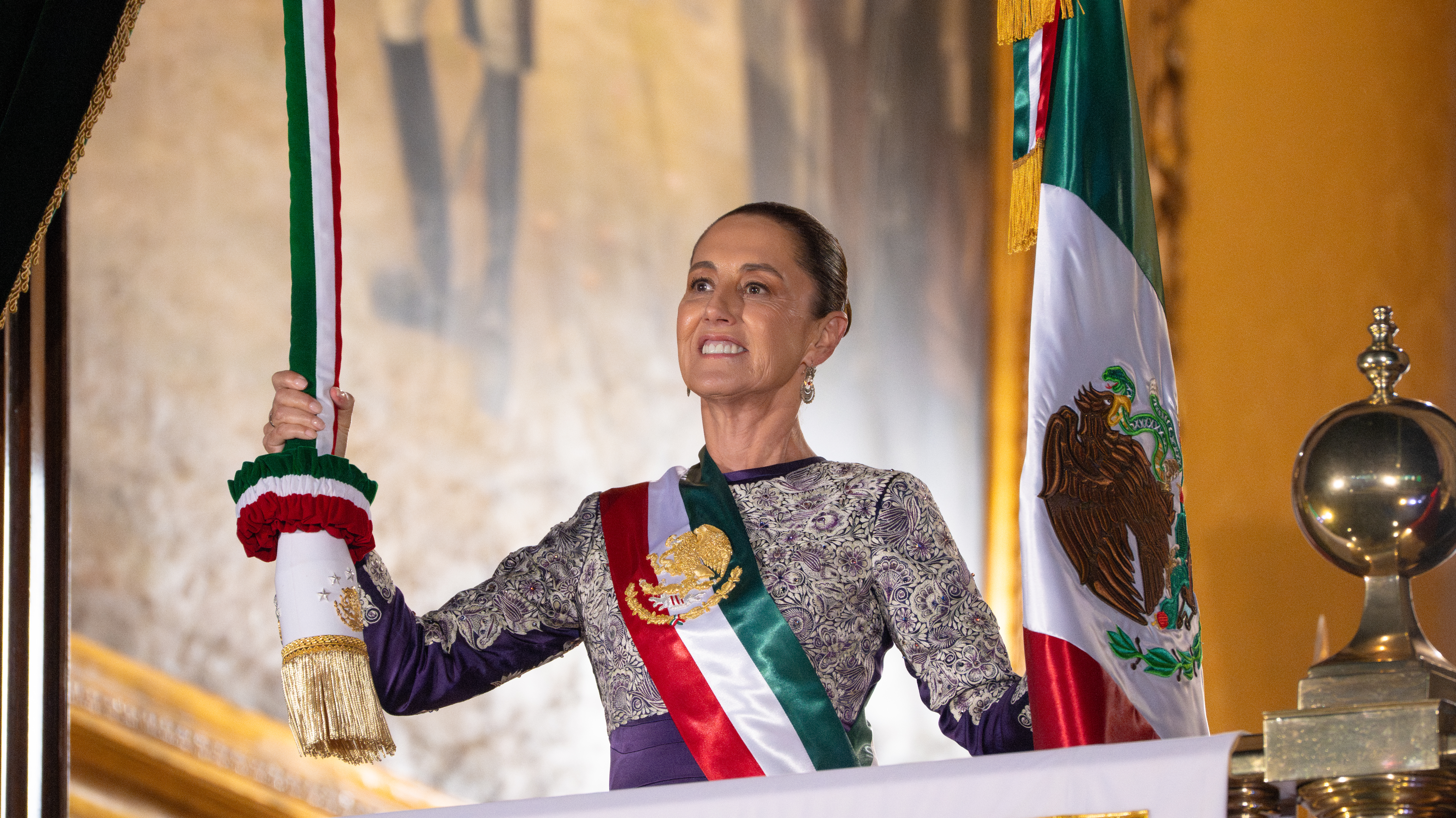
President Claudia Sheinbaum leading the ceremony on the main balcony of the National Palace in Mexico City on September 15, 2025. Sheinbaum is the first woman in Mexican history to lead the ceremony.

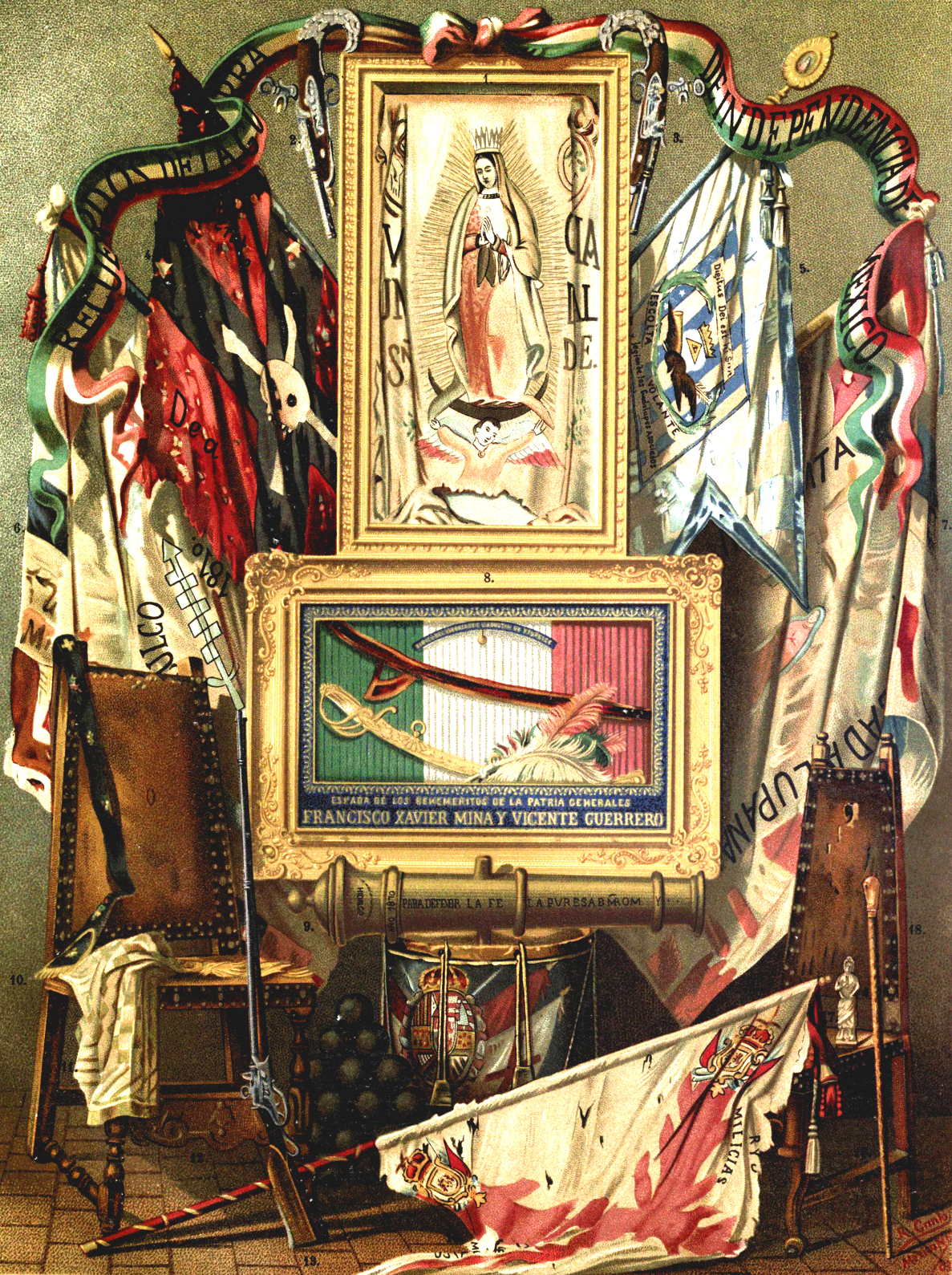
Image extracted from the 1880 book by Vicente Riva Palacio and Julio Zárate, México a través de los siglos Tomo III: La Guerra de Independencia (1808–1821)

== National festivities ==
The day of 16 September was first celebrated in 1812 in Huichapan, Hidalgo. It was given the status of a national holiday in the Constitution of Apatzingán, ratified by the conventions of 1822 and 1824, and first celebrated nationally in 1825.
