= Dolores Hidalgo =

- City and Municipality
- Dolores Hidalgo Cuna de la Independencia Nacional
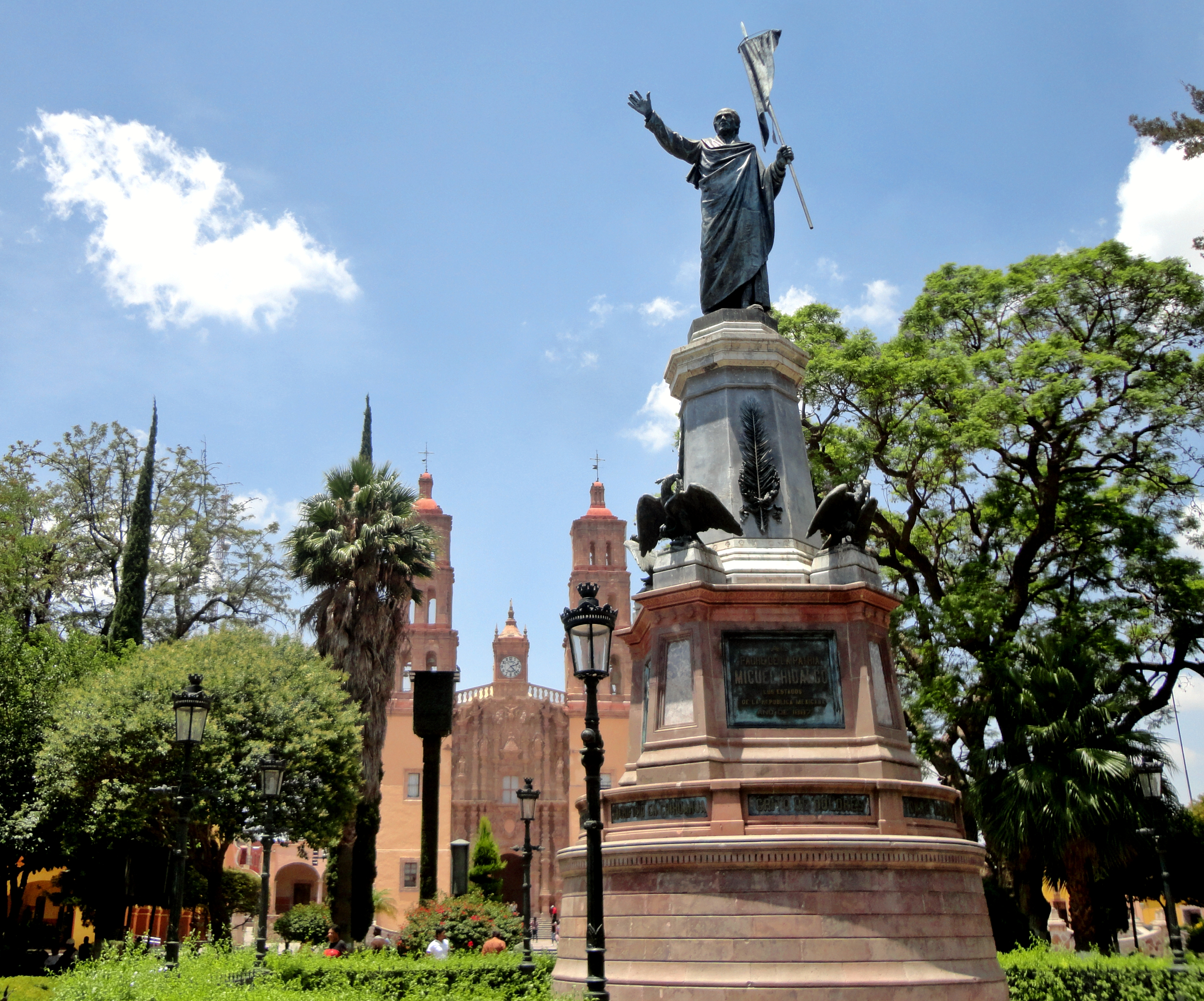

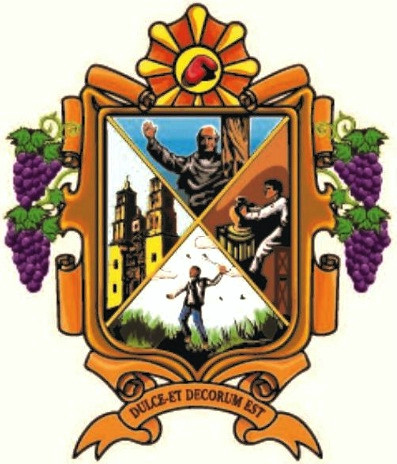
- Coat of arms

- Location within Mexico Location within Guanajuato
- Coordinates: 21°9′5.7″N 100°56′12.8″W
- Country: Mexico
- State: Guanajuato
- Established: September 16, 1810

Government
  - Type: Municipality
  - Municipality President: Adrian Hernández Alejandri

Area
  - City: 13.26 km^{2} (5.12 sq mi)
  - Municipality: 1,656 km^{2} (639 sq mi)

Population (2020 census)
  - City: 67,101
  - Density: 5,060/km^{2} (13,110/sq mi)
  - Municipality: 163,038
  - Municipality density: 98.45/km^{2} (255.0/sq mi)
- Time zone: Zona Centro
- Postal Code: 37800–37849
- Area code: 02-8082722

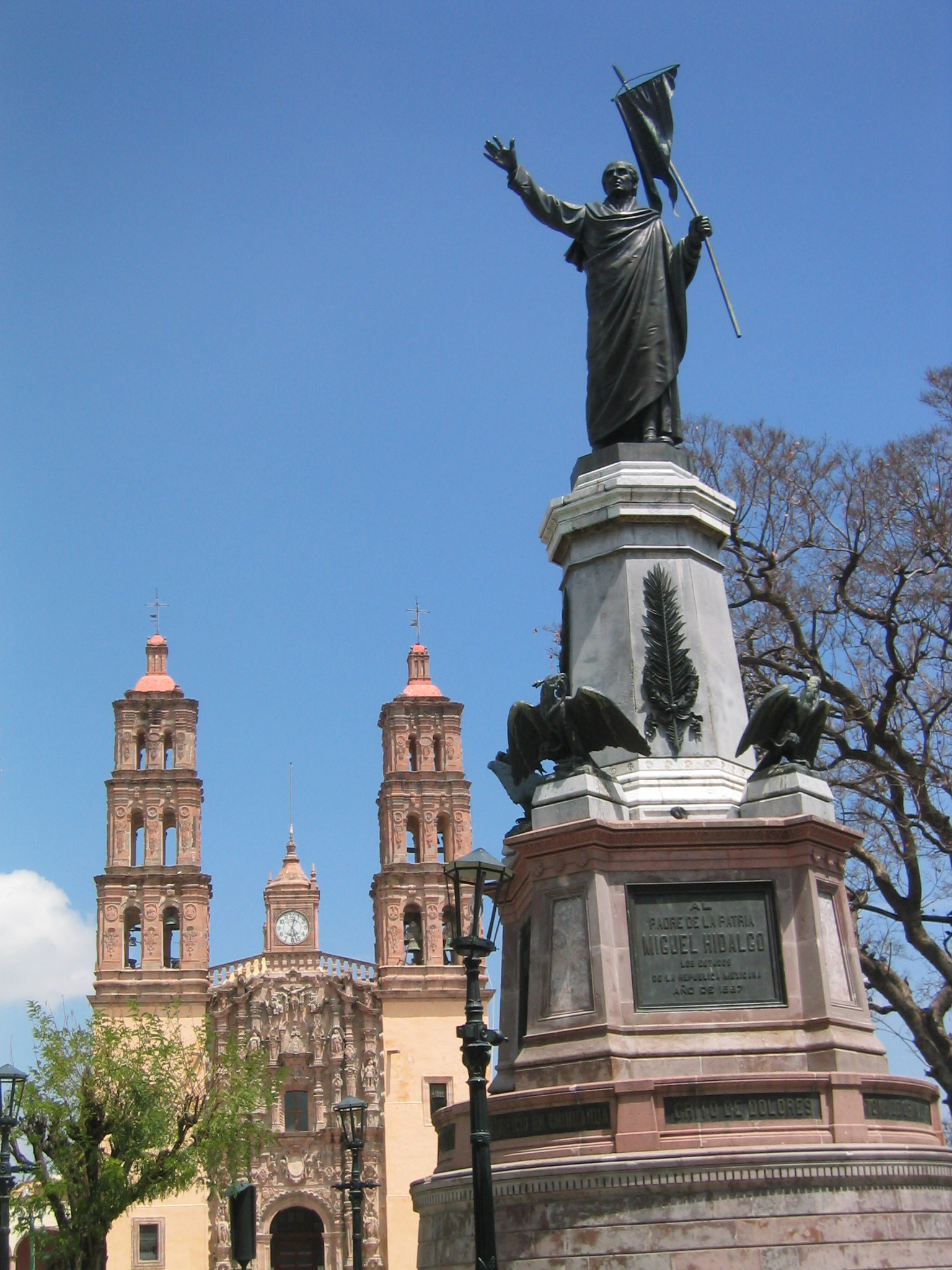
Church and the Statue of Hidalgo

Dolores Hidalgo (Spanish: [doˈloɾes iˈðalɣo]), in full Dolores Hidalgo Cuna de la Independencia Nacional (English: Dolores Hidalgo, Birthplace of National Independence), is the name of a city and the surrounding municipality in the north-central part of the Mexican state of Guanajuato.

It is located at 21.17°N 100.93°W, at an elevation of about 1,980 meters (6,500 feet) above sea level. In the census of 2005 the city had a population of 54,843, while the municipality had 134,641 inhabitants. The city lies directly in the center of the municipality, which is 1,656 km^{2} (639 sq mi) in area and includes numerous small outlying communities, the largest of which is Río Laja with a population of 2,211 (2005 census).

Dolores Hidalgo was named a Pueblo Mágico (Magic Town) in 2002.

== History ==
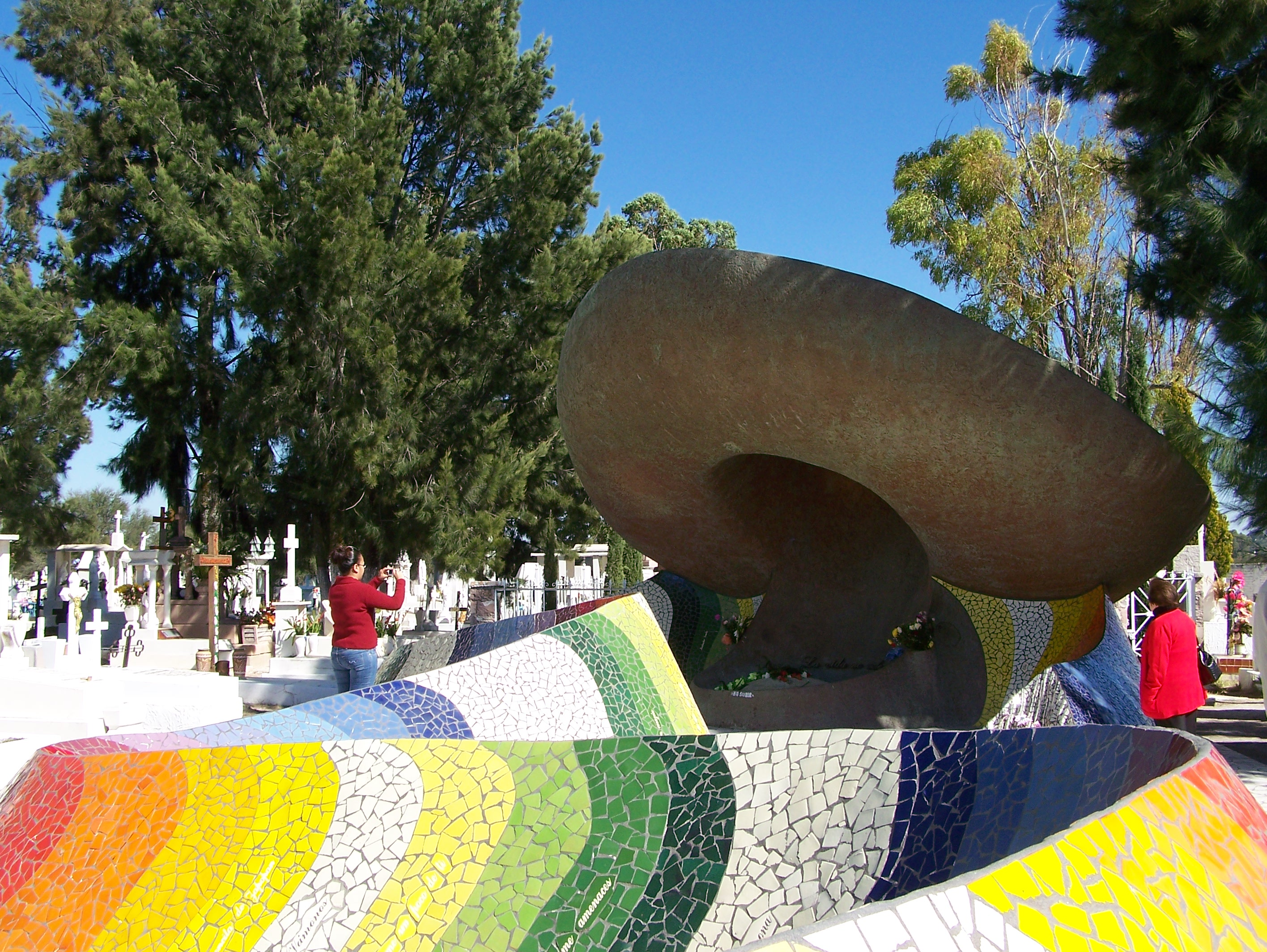
Tomb of José Alfredo Jiménez

The city was a small town known simply as Dolores when Father Miguel Hidalgo y Costilla uttered his famous cry for the independence of Mexico (the Grito de Dolores) there in the early hours of September 16, 1810, in front of Nuestra Señora de los Dolores parish church. After Mexico achieved independence, the town was renamed Dolores Hidalgo in his honor.

Today Dolores Hidalgo is known primarily for its ceramics industry, started by Father Hidalgo, which provides income to well over half the city's population. The inexpensive and mass-produced output of the town is marketed throughout Latin America and the United States. The central square of the town, in front of Fr Hidalgo's historic church, is a popular tourist spot.

A place of pilgrimage in Dolores Hidalgo for many fans of ranchera and popular music is the tomb of José Alfredo Jiménez, one of the country's most famous singers and songwriters. He is buried in the town cemetery.

Footballer Adolfo "El Bofo" Bautista and USA Olympian Leonel Manzano were born here.

== Climate ==
Climate data for Dolores Hidalgo (1991–2020 normals, extremes 1951–2022)
Month	Jan	Feb	Mar	Apr	May	Jun	Jul	Aug	Sep	Oct	Nov	Dec	Year
Record high °C (°F)	33.5 (92.3)	37.5 (99.5)	40.8 (105.4)	39.0 (102.2)	40.5 (104.9)	39.5 (103.1)	38.5 (101.3)	37.5 (99.5)	36.0 (96.8)	36.5 (97.7)	35.0 (95.0)	33.0 (91.4)	40.8 (105.4)
Mean daily maximum °C (°F)	24.7 (76.5)	27.2 (81.0)	30.1 (86.2)	31.8 (89.2)	32.4 (90.3)	30.2 (86.4)	28.7 (83.7)	28.6 (83.5)	27.5 (81.5)	27.1 (80.8)	26.0 (78.8)	24.9 (76.8)	28.3 (82.9)
Daily mean °C (°F)	14.3 (57.7)	16.3 (61.3)	18.8 (65.8)	21.1 (70.0)	22.2 (72.0)	21.6 (70.9)	20.6 (69.1)	20.6 (69.1)	19.9 (67.8)	18.2 (64.8)	16.3 (61.3)	14.6 (58.3)	18.7 (65.7)
Mean daily minimum °C (°F)	3.9 (39.0)	5.4 (41.7)	7.6 (45.7)	10.3 (50.5)	12.1 (53.8)	12.9 (55.2)	12.6 (54.7)	12.6 (54.7)	12.2 (54.0)	9.4 (48.9)	6.5 (43.7)	4.2 (39.6)	9.1 (48.4)
Record low °C (°F)	−7.0 (19.4)	−9.5 (14.9)	−4.5 (23.9)	0.0 (32.0)	3.5 (38.3)	2.5 (36.5)	7.0 (44.6)	2.0 (35.6)	1.0 (33.8)	−1.5 (29.3)	−6.5 (20.3)	−8.0 (17.6)	−9.5 (14.9)
Average precipitation mm (inches)	12.4 (0.49)	14.9 (0.59)	10.3 (0.41)	8.7 (0.34)	31.6 (1.24)	70.4 (2.77)	97.6 (3.84)	84.8 (3.34)	92.0 (3.62)	31.9 (1.26)	9.9 (0.39)	4.4 (0.17)	468.9 (18.46)
Average precipitation days (≥ 0.1 mm)	2.8	1.9	1.9	2.7	6.4	8.7	11.9	10.1	10.8	5.8	2.3	1.2	66.5
Source: Servicio Meteorológico Nacional

== Notable people ==
- Adolfo "Bofo" Bautista (born 1979), footballer
- José Alfredo Jiménez (1926–1973), singer
- Leonel "Leo" Manzano (born 1984), US Olympian
- Esperanza Zambrano (1901–1992), poet
