= Guanajuato (city) =

- City and municipality
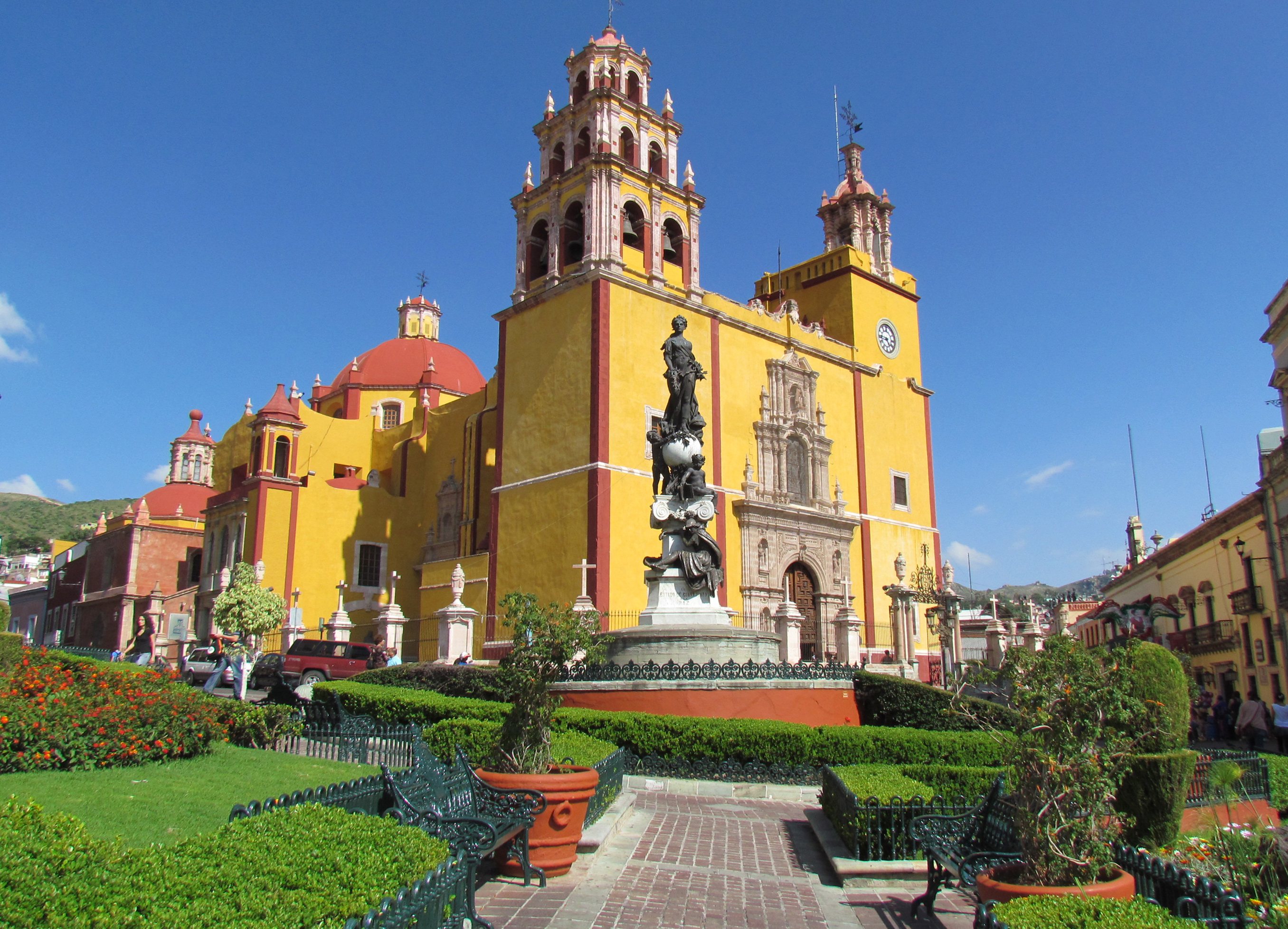
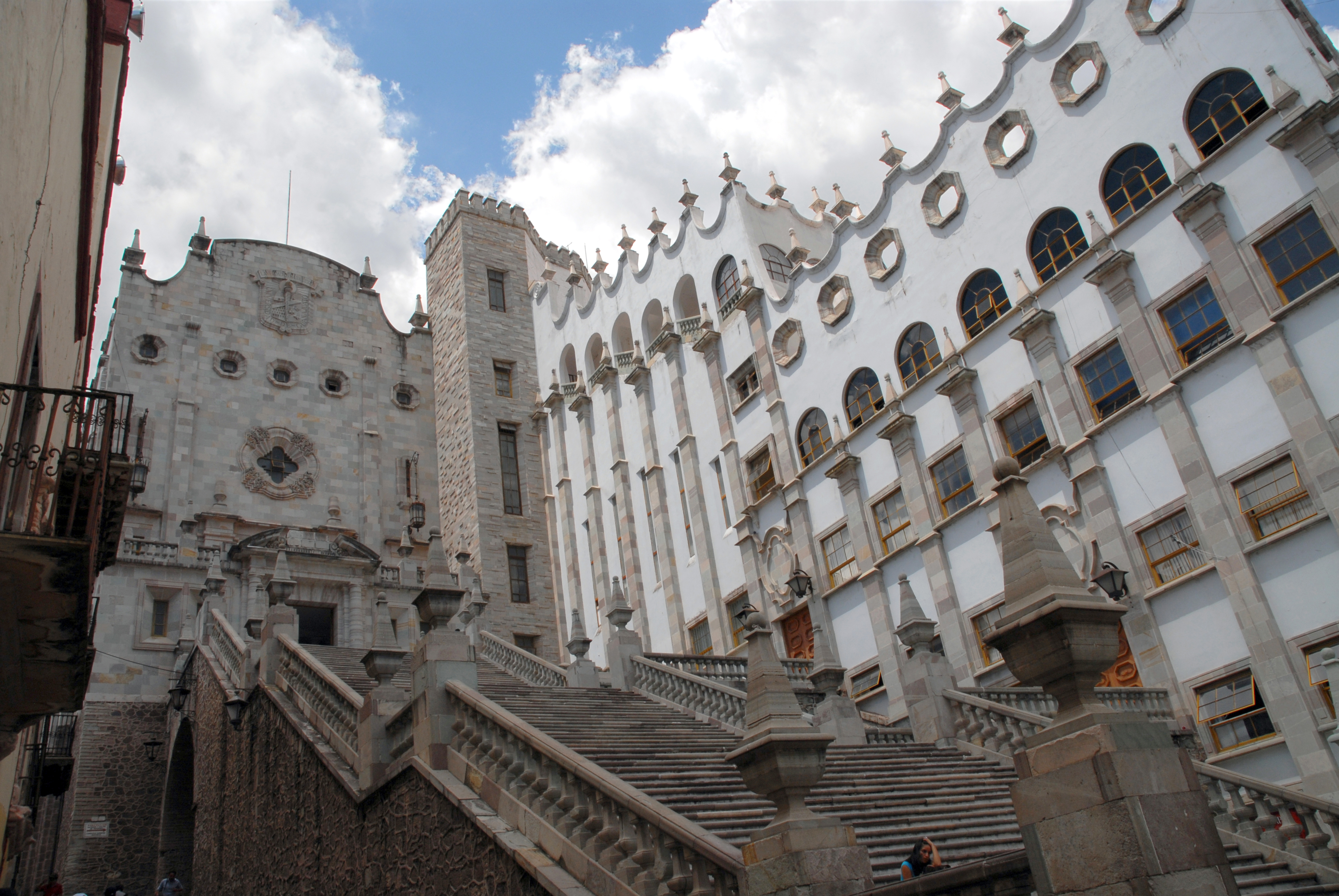
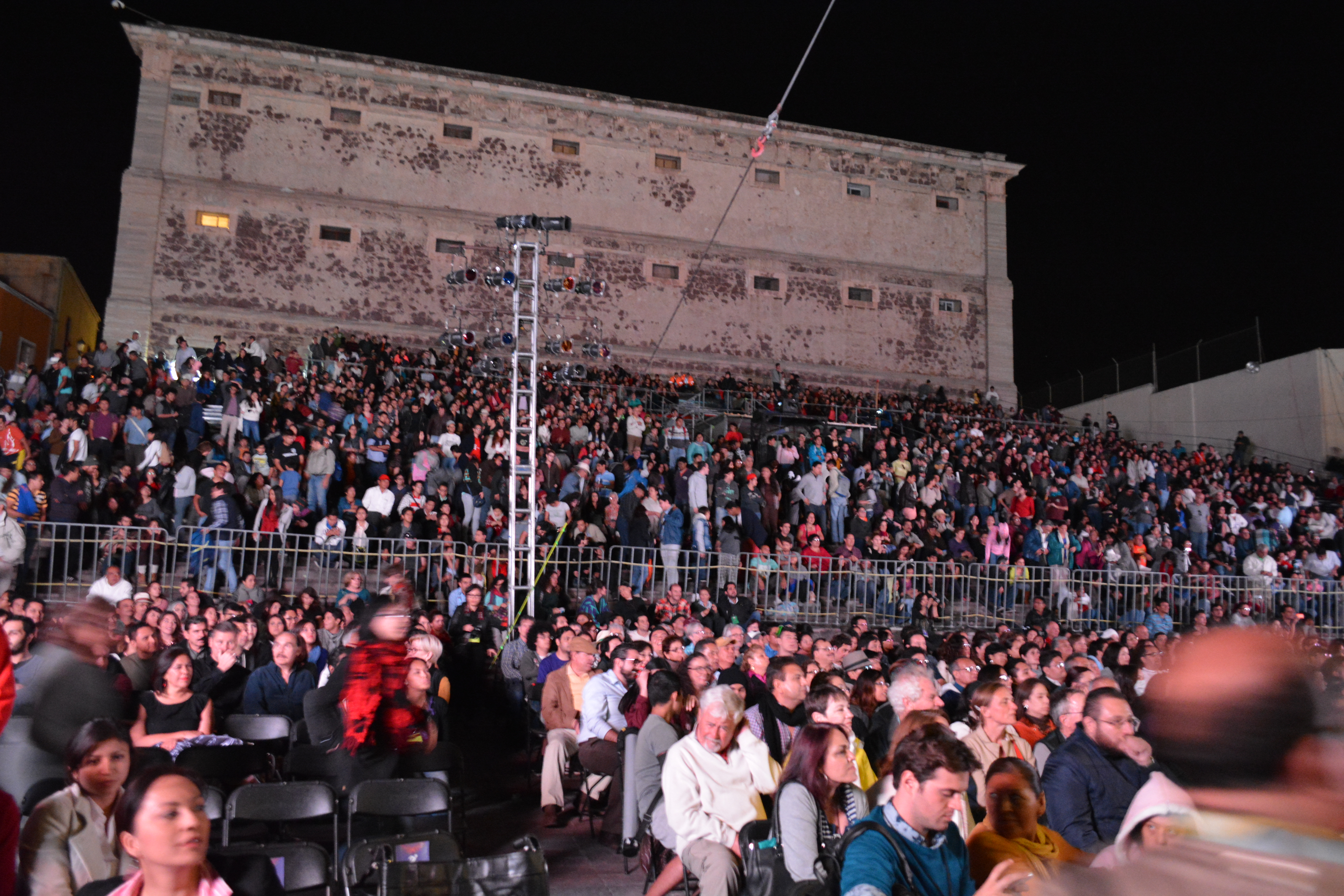
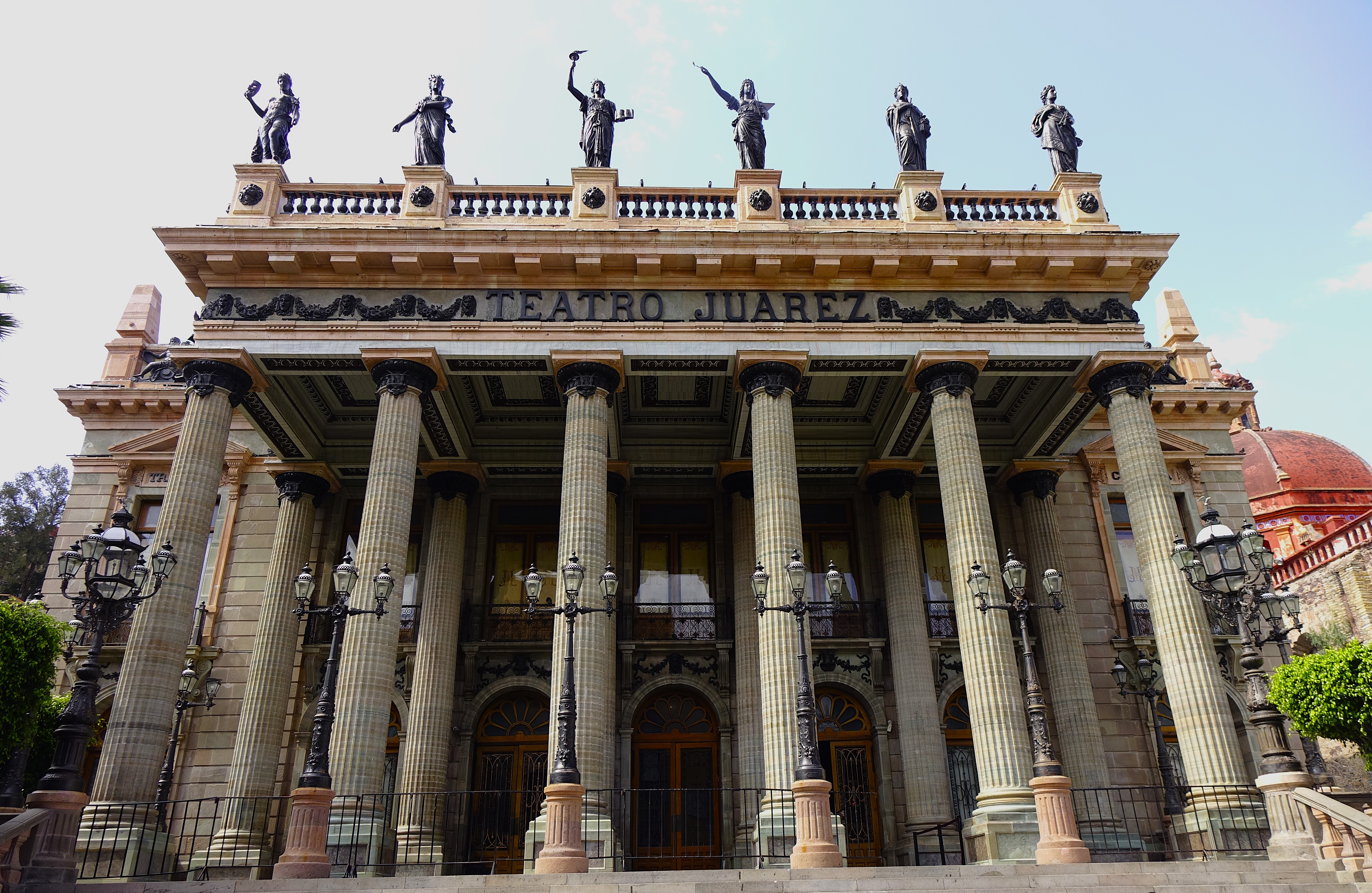
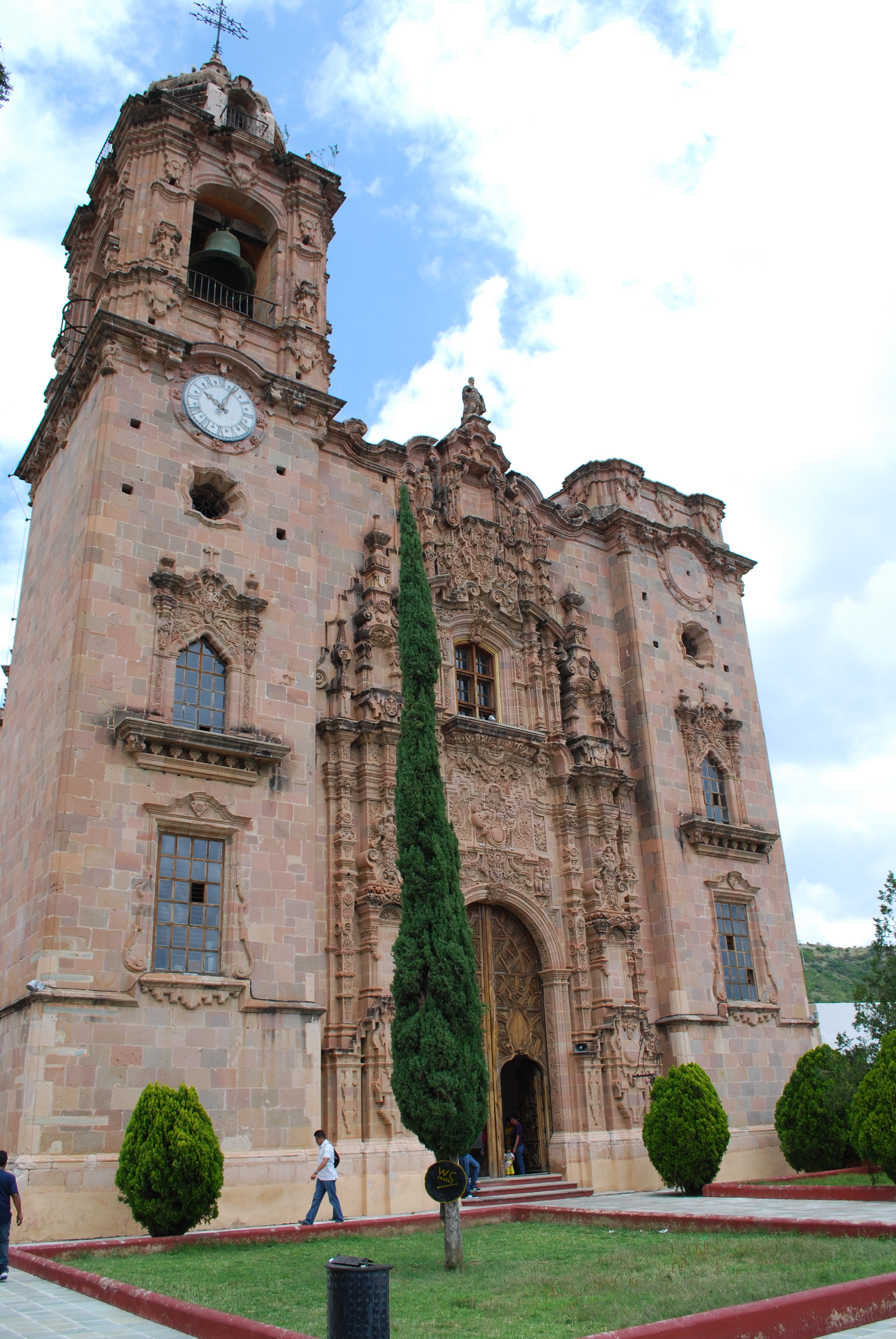
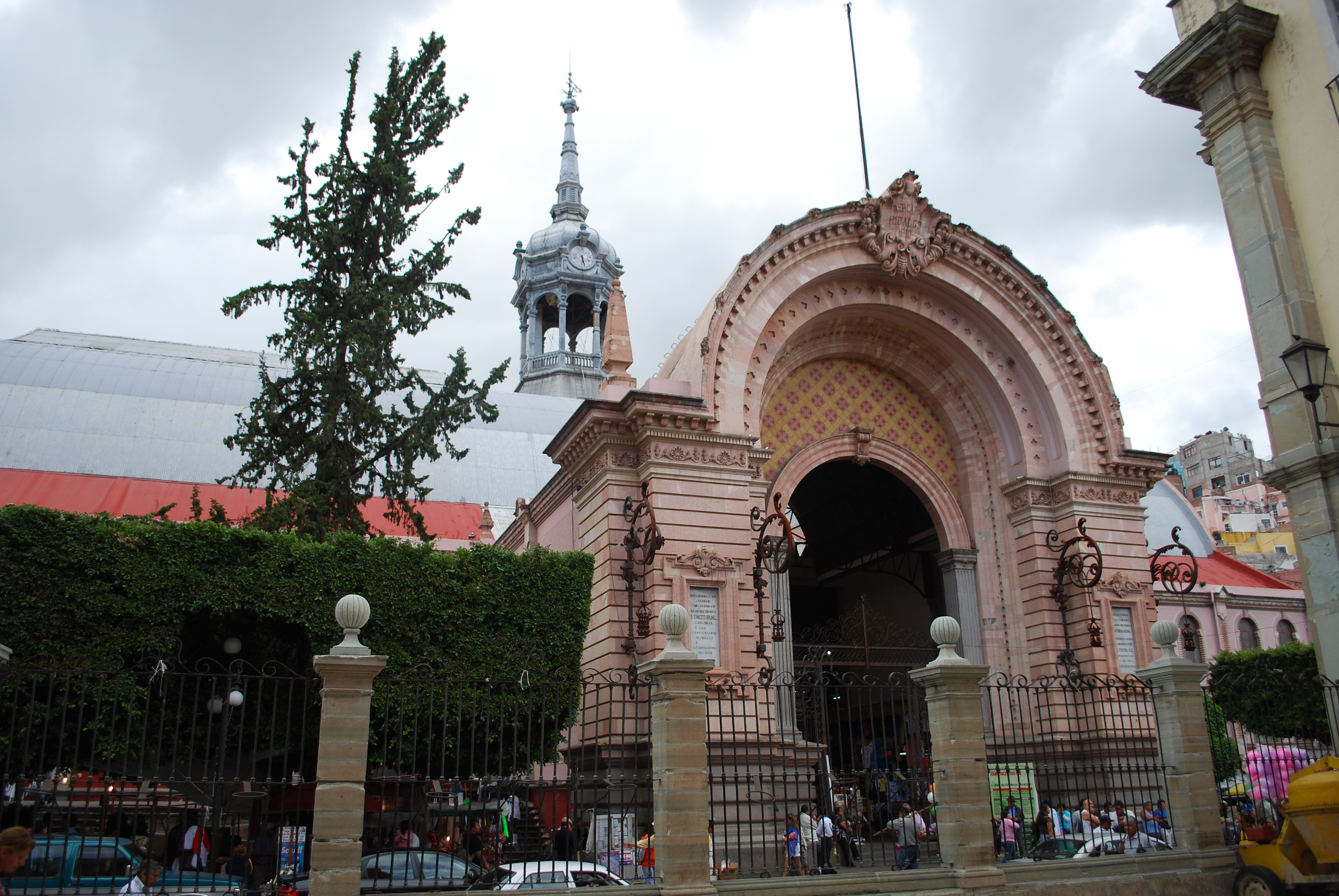
- View of the historic center from the hill above Basílica Colegiata University of Guanajuato Alhóndiga de Granaditas during the Cervantino Festival Juárez Theater Church of the Valenciana silver mine Hidalgo market

- Coat of arms

- Location in Guanajuato Guanajuato (Mexico)
- Coordinates: 21°01′04″N 101°15′24″W
- Country: Mexico
- State: Guanajuato
- Founded: 1548
- Founded as: Real de Minas de Guanajuato
- Founder: Antonio de Mendoza

Government
  - Municipal President: Samantha Smith Gutiérrez (PAN)

Area
  - Municipality: 1,014 km^{2} (392 sq mi)
  - City: 12.25 km^{2} (4.73 sq mi)
- Elevation (of seat): 2,045 m (6,709 ft)

Population (2020 census)
  - Municipality: 194,500
  - Density: 191.8/km^{2} (496.8/sq mi)
  - City: 70,068
  - City density: 5,720/km^{2} (14,810/sq mi)
- Demonym: (in Spanish) Guanajuatense
- Time zone: UTC−6 (CST)
- Postal code (of seat): 36000
- Area code: +52 473
- Website: (in Spanish)

UNESCO World Heritage Site
- Official name: Historic Town of Guanajuato and Adjacent Mines
- Type: Cultural
- Criteria: I, II, IV, VI
- Designated: 1988 (12th session)
- Reference no.: 482
- Region: Latin America and the Caribbean

Guanajuato (Spanish pronunciation: [gwanaˈxwato], Otomi: Ndänuë) is a municipality in central Mexico and the capital of the state of Guanajuato. It is part of the Bajío macroregion. The city is built in a narrow valley, which gives its streets a winding layout; many are narrow alleys inaccessible to cars, while others consist of long stairways up the mountainsides. Several of its thoroughfares run partially or entirely underground. Its historic center contains numerous small plazas and colonial-era mansions, churches, and civic buildings constructed from pink or green sandstone. The historic center and adjacent mines were designated a UNESCO World Heritage Site in 1988.

Guanajuato's wealth came from the rich mineral deposits in the surrounding mountains. Its mines were among the most important in the Americas during the colonial period, alongside those of Zacatecas in Mexico, Potosí in Bolivia, and Ouro Preto in Brazil. One of these mines, Valenciana Mine, was responsible for two-thirds of the world's silver production at the height of its output. For this reason, the UNESCO designation applies to the Historic Town and Adjacent Mines.

The city is also home to the Mummy Museum, which houses naturally mummified bodies found in the municipal cemetery between the mid-19th and 20th centuries. It is likewise home to the Festival Internacional Cervantino, which attracts artists and performers from Mexico and around the world. Guanajuato was also the site of the first battle of the Mexican War of Independence, fought between insurgent forces and royalist troops at the Alhóndiga de Granaditas.

== History ==
=== Pre-Hispanic period ===
The first known inhabitants of the area were the Otomi, who were then displaced by the Chichimeca. There was Purépecha presence as well due mostly to ancient trading routes. The oldest known name for the area is "Mo-o-ti", which means "place of metals." Later, it was called "Paxtitlán" by the Aztecs, which means "place of Spanish moss." The current name of Guanajuato comes from Purépecha kuanhasï juáta (or in older spelling "quanax huato"), which means "frog hill".

Mining had been done in this area long before the Spanish arrived. Late in the pre-Hispanic period the Aztecs had a presence here, specifically to look for metals to make ornamental objects for their political and religious elite. Some stories from this time state that the area was so rich in minerals that nuggets of gold could be picked up from the ground.

=== Colonial era ===
The Spanish found deposits of gold here in the 1540s and soon they sent soldiers and built forts. In 1548, the outpost was formally established with the name of Real de Minas de Guanajuato by viceroy Don Antonio de Mendoza. Despite Chichimeca attacks, the population of the area grew rapidly with the arrival of Spanish and Creole migrants and indigenous and mestizo traders and workers. It was soon declared a town with the name of Santa Fe Real de Minas de Guanajuato, with Preafán de Rivera as mayor. Its first church was consecrated in 1555, and it was named an “alcaldía mayor” in 1574.

Initially, the city was divided into four barrios or neighborhoods called Marfil/Santiago, Tepetapa, Santa Ana and Santa Fe. The last is considered the oldest and is in the current colonia of Pastita. This city was split by a small river that served as a main thoroughfare. The oldest neighborhoods are Rayas y Mellado, Cata, La Valenciana, and Pastita, named after the mines found there.

The very first mineral vein discovered, called San Bernabé, attracted attention not only in New Spain, but in Spain itself. The discovery brought thousands of migrants to the area, which led to the discovery of other deposits, such as at the Rayas mine. The San Bernabé find produced until 1928, when it tapped out. Today, the remains of this mine are found in the small village of La Luz, just outside the city proper.

Basílica Colegiata de Nuestra Señora de Guanajuato (Our Lady of Guanajuato) built in 1671 to 1696.

In 1679, by decree of viceroy of Mexico Fray Payo Enriquez de Rivera, the name was changed to Ciudad de Santa Fe y Real de Minas de Guanajuato (Very Noble and Loyal City of Santa Fe y Real de Minas de Guanajuato). It received an escutcheon in the same year, which is still in use. The city's coat of arms has a gold background with an image of a woman in the center referring to the Holy Faith (Santa Fe). It contains other images such as a seashell supported by two laurel branches, blue ribbon and marble columns. It is topped with the royal crown of Castille and acanthus leaves.

In 1741, the city received the title of “The Most Noble and Loyal City of Santa Fe de Minas de Guanajuato” and became an “intendencia” (province) in 1790 because of the abundance of riches coming from its mines. In the 18th century, it was the world's leading silver extraction center, making it the richest city in Mexico for much of the early colonial period. The production of the La Valenciana mine alone affected the world economy, and made the counts of Valencianas one of the most powerful families in New Spain. The city was one of the richest and most opulent in New Spain in the 18th century. This wealth is manifested in its civil and religious architecture.

The Oratorio de San Felipe Neri was dedicated in 1765 by the Jesuits; it was taken over by the Oratorian order and reopened in 1794

The colonial architecture includes some of the best Baroque and Churrigueresque examples in the New World—such as the Valenciana, Cata, and La Compañía (Jesuit) Churches, the Templo de San Francisco and the Basílica Colegiata de Nuestra Señora de Guanajuato (Our Lady of Guanajuato). Many constructions from this time are of pink or green sandstone. In the churches, the Baroque altars were gilded with gold from local mines. These structures have influenced later buildings throughout central Mexico. According to UNESCO, the La Compañía and La Valenciana churches are considered among the most beautiful examples of Baroque architecture in Central and South America.

=== Independence ===
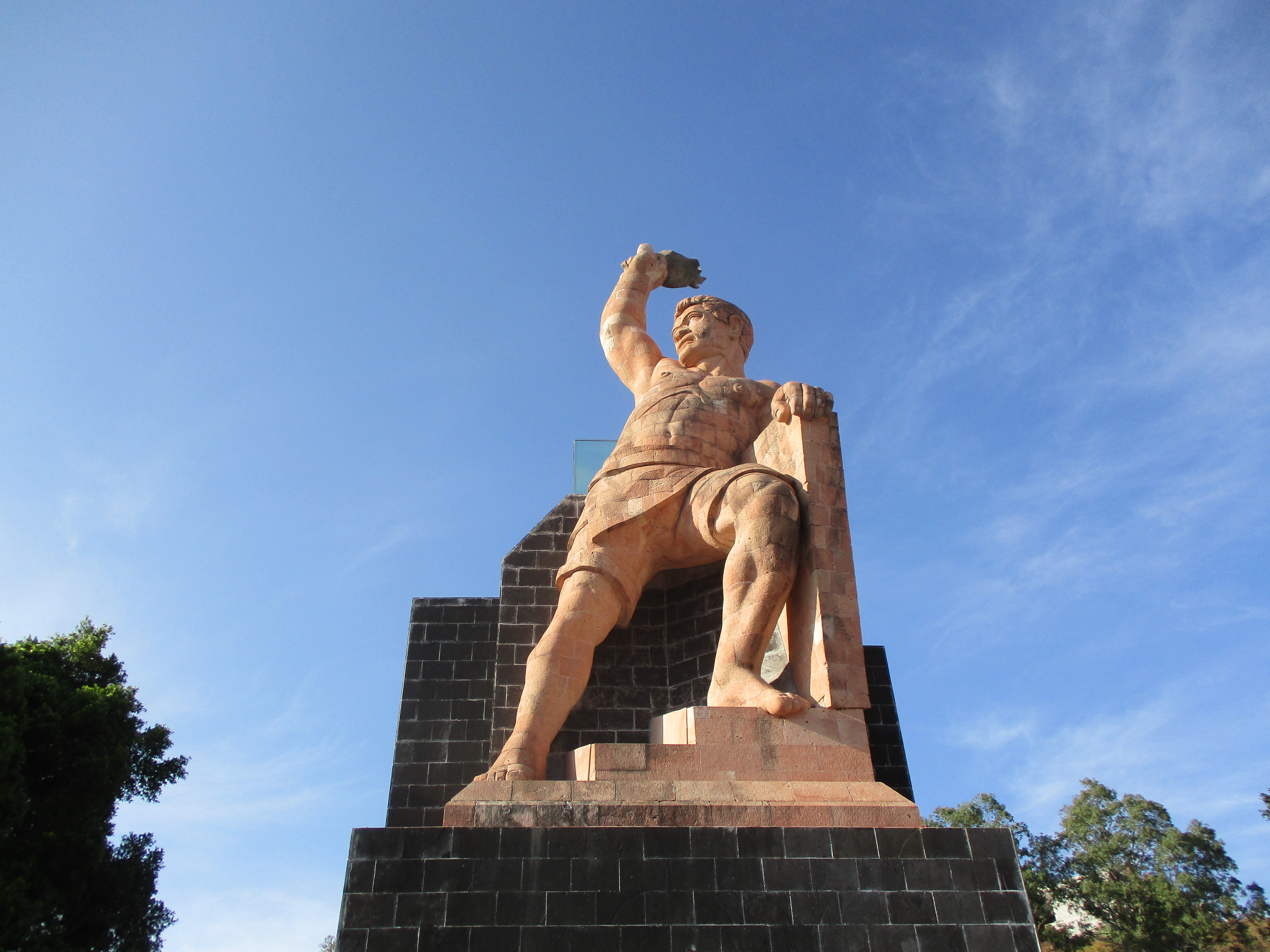
Monument to the Pípila, legendary hero of the Mexican War of Independence.

By the end of the 18th century, the lower classes were poor and oppressed despite the great wealth coming out of the mines. One event foreshadowing the Mexican War of Independence was a revolt carried out in the city attacking the heavily militarized Caja Real (building to hold the Crown's share of mining production) to protest the high taxes. One year later there were large protests against the expulsion of the Jesuits.

The War of Independence broke out in the state of Guanajuato in the town of Dolores, when Father Miguel Hidalgo y Costilla shouted the “Grito de Dolores” and raised an insurgent army on September 15 and 16, 1810. This army marched to San Miguel, today San Miguel de Allende, and then on to the city of Guanajuato.

Just on the outskirts on September 28, 1810, Hidalgo sent a warning letter to city authorities, but it was ignored. Instead, royalist troops and many of the elite made their stand at the Alhóndiga de Granaditas granary, an imposing building with few windows and thick walls. After entering the city unopposed, Hidalgo decided to attack the granary. This was the first battle against Spanish troops in the war and is popularly called the 'Siege of the Alhondiga'. The insurgents were unable to take the heavily defended building as royalist gunfire kept them from approaching the only entrance until a miner by the name of Juan José de los Reyes Martínez, better known as El Pípila, strapped a large flat stone onto his back for protection. Crawling, he carried a flask of tar and a torch. When he reached the wooden doors of the main entrance, he smeared it with the tar and set it on fire. This allowed the insurgents to penetrate the building, defeat the Spanish royalist army and elite, and take over the heavily fortified and defended building. This action is commemorated by a colossal statue of El Pípila on a hill overlooking the city.

=== Post Independence ===
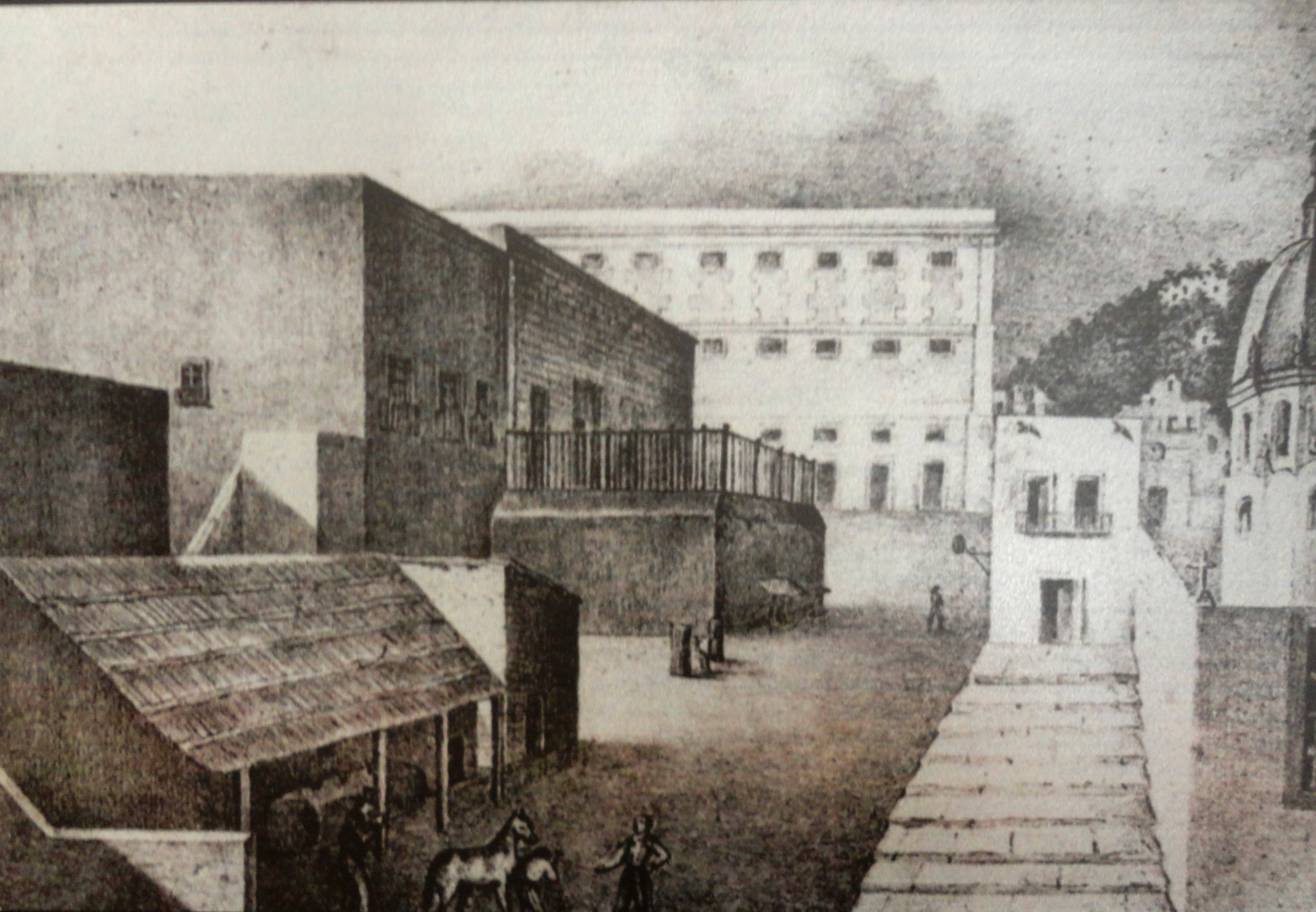
Guanajuato in the 19th century.

After Independence, the province of Guanajuato was made a state, and the city was made its capital in 1824. However, fighting in the state and the rest of the country continued as Liberals, who wanted a Federalist government, fought with Conservatives, who wanted a centralized government under a monarch or dictator. Power in the city and state changed hands between the two factions during much of the 19th century, taking its toll on mining. The city was the provisional capital of the country in 1858 as Liberal president Benito Juárez fought Conservative rebels. In 1863, the French took the city during the French Intervention in Mexico, receiving a visit from the installed Emperor Maximiliano I and his wife, Carlota. French occupation ended in early 1867. The Mexican General Florencio Antillón captured it on January 26, 1868, from the Conservatives.

Mining reactivated around the 1870s due to foreign investments encouraged by the Porfirio Díaz government. During the late 19th and early 20th centuries this renewed economic activity spurred new era Mexican projects such as the Juárez Theater, the Esperanza Dam, the Monumento a la Paz, the Hidalgo Monument and the State Government Palace. As of early 2026, the city was a noteworthy producer of silver and gold, particularly through the efforts of the Guanajuato Silver Company Ltd.

Flooding had been a serious problem through most of the city's history, due to the area's steep compact hillsides. In 1760 and 1780 two major floods nearly wiped it out. This spurred construction of large ditches and tunnels to contain and divert overflows during the rainy season. These eventually crisscrossed a large part of the city. Dam construction in the 1960s brought the flooding under control, and many of the ditches and tunnels were converted into underground roadways.

The historic city center and nearby mines were declared a World Heritage Site in 1988.The first Festival Internacional Cervantino was held in 1972. While the author never did visit Mexico, Guanajuato has close emotional ties to Cervantine works; the city bills itself as the Cervantes Capital of the Americas and exhibits statues of Don Quijote and Sancho Panza.

== Geography ==
=== Climate ===
Two climates predominate. One is fairly hot and dominates in the south and southeast portions of the municipality. The other is temperate and dominates the rest of the territory, including the city. In the warmer areas, temperatures can reach as high as 36 °C (97 °F) in the summer and in the coldest area can get as low as 3 °C (37 °F) in the winter. Average temperature overall is 18.5 °C (65.3 °F) with an average annual precipitation of between 600 and 840 mm (23.6 and 33.1 in). Most of the rain falls during the monsoon season between June and September.

Climate data for Guanajuato (1991–2020, extremes 1883–present)
Month	Jan	Feb	Mar	Apr	May	Jun	Jul	Aug	Sep	Oct	Nov	Dec	Year
Record high °C (°F)	28.9 (84.0)	33.3 (91.9)	35.7 (96.3)	39.0 (102.2)	39.4 (102.9)	39.2 (102.6)	36.6 (97.9)	39.6 (103.3)	35.1 (95.2)	35.7 (96.3)	36.6 (97.9)	31.0 (87.8)	39.6 (103.3)
Mean daily maximum °C (°F)	23.0 (73.4)	25.3 (77.5)	28.1 (82.6)	30.6 (87.1)	31.7 (89.1)	30.0 (86.0)	28.1 (82.6)	28.5 (83.3)	27.0 (80.6)	26.4 (79.5)	24.9 (76.8)	23.3 (73.9)	27.2 (81.0)
Daily mean °C (°F)	15.1 (59.2)	16.9 (62.4)	19.3 (66.7)	21.6 (70.9)	23.1 (73.6)	22.5 (72.5)	21.3 (70.3)	21.5 (70.7)	20.6 (69.1)	19.3 (66.7)	17.2 (63.0)	15.5 (59.9)	19.5 (67.1)
Mean daily minimum °C (°F)	7.3 (45.1)	8.5 (47.3)	10.4 (50.7)	12.7 (54.9)	14.5 (58.1)	15.1 (59.2)	14.4 (57.9)	14.6 (58.3)	14.2 (57.6)	12.2 (54.0)	9.5 (49.1)	7.6 (45.7)	11.8 (53.2)
Record low °C (°F)	−1.9 (28.6)	−5.1 (22.8)	0.3 (32.5)	1.5 (34.7)	1.0 (33.8)	5.8 (42.4)	8.2 (46.8)	5.0 (41.0)	1.0 (33.8)	1.0 (33.8)	−4.0 (24.8)	−2.4 (27.7)	−5.1 (22.8)
Average precipitation mm (inches)	18.2 (0.72)	14.8 (0.58)	12.9 (0.51)	12.4 (0.49)	41.0 (1.61)	138.4 (5.45)	187.8 (7.39)	147.0 (5.79)	131.3 (5.17)	43.1 (1.70)	9.9 (0.39)	6.6 (0.26)	763.4 (30.06)
Average precipitation days (≥ 0.1 mm)	3.1	2.1	2.5	3.0	7.4	12.8	15.6	13.9	12.1	5.8	2.0	1.8	82.1
Average relative humidity (%)	64.6	59.6	56.1	52.9	56.8	67.2	73.0	72.4	72.6	67.7	66.5	65.7	64.6
Mean monthly sunshine hours	210.0	214.9	259.2	256.1	254.6	208.0	201.7	206.5	178.7	220.0	216.5	205.7	2,631.9
Source 1: Servicio Meteorologico Nacional
Source 2: NOAA (precipitation days, humidity, sun 1991-2020)

== Layout and transportation ==
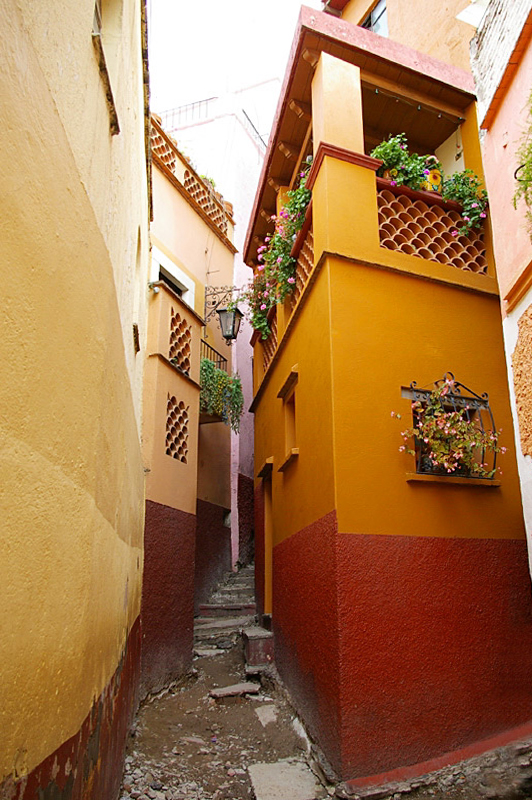
Callejón del Beso (Kiss Alley).

Initially, the city was divided into four barrios or neighborhoods: Marfil/Santiago, Tepetapa, Santa Ana and Santa Fe. The last is considered the oldest and is in the current colonia of Pastita. The city was split by a small river that serves as a main thoroughfare. Because of the extremely hilly terrain, only one main road enters and another one leaves. The main street into the city, called Belaunzarán, now runs for three km underground and follows the original course of the Guanajuato River. Unlike the regular layouts of many other Spanish and Mexican cities, the streets of Guanajuato follow the extreme irregularity of the terrain, with small alleyways, plazas and in some cases steep staircases up hillsides. Most are paved with square cut stone, with only a limited number that are passable to cars. Most of the passageways are really alleys with a limited amount of open space in the way of very small plazas, which gives the city a more European flavor than other Mexican cities.

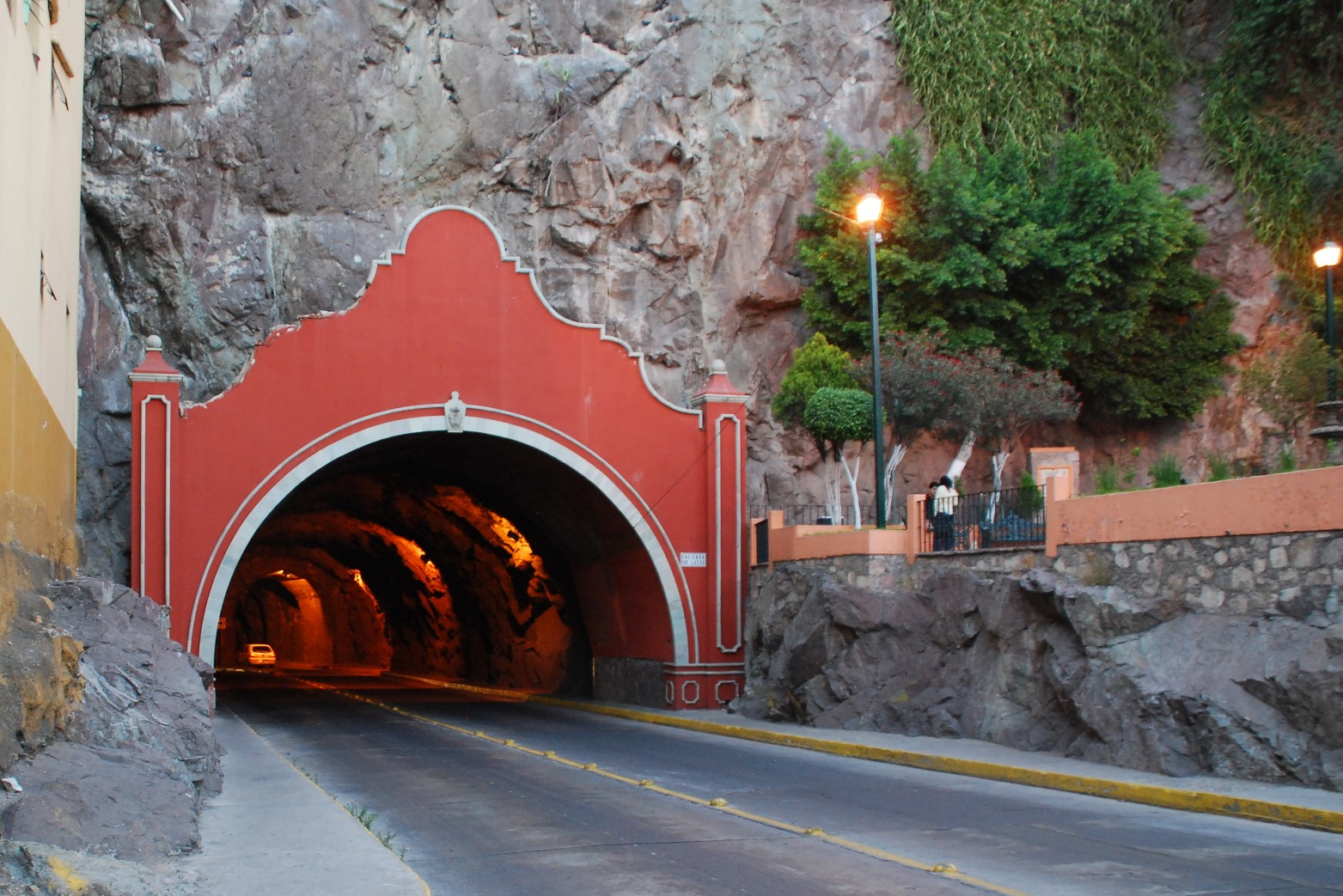
Tunnel entrance

A number of these alleys have no names and some have whimsical names such as "Sal si puedes" (Exit if you can). Another famous alley is the Callejón Tecolote, through which Ignacio Allende and Miguel Hidalgo entered with their army in 1810. One alley near the State Government Palace is called the Callejón de la Condesa (Alley of the Countess). The name comes from the lady of one of the mansions who lived there in the very late 18th and very early 19th centuries. Ashamed of her husband's bad reputation with other women, before and after the marriage, the Countess began to enter and leave her home through the back door into this alley to avoid the glances of the townspeople.

The most famous alley is the Callejón del Beso (Alley of the Kiss). Located on the slopes of the Cerro del Gallo hill in a neighborhood that dates back to the 18th century, it is only 168 cm (66 in) wide in places with balconies that nearly touch each other. Folklore states that couples who kiss on the third step (painted in red) are guaranteed seven years of happiness together. The name comes from a legend of two young lovers who come to a tragic end: Doña Carmen and Don Luis. Carmen's father forbade the courting of his daughter by the young Luis, threatening to send her to a convent if she left the house to see him. Carmen's balcony reached over this alley and nearly touched the balcony of the neighboring house. Luis found out who owned it and arranged access. One evening, while the two were on these balconies, Carmen's father discovered them as Luis held Carmen's hand between his own. Enraged, Carmen's father stabbed her, leaving the shocked Luis holding the hand of his beloved as it grew cold and lifeless, giving it one final kiss.

The narrow streets and alleys have given rise to a pastime called "callejoneadas". These are roving parties, traditionally held by the students of the University of Guanajuato with live musicians. Today, there are callejoneadas arranged for tourists as well.

Juárez Street is one of the few through streets on the surface. It is filled with stores and restaurants and has a constant flow of people and traffic. The other through streets of town are either partially or fully underground, following the old drainage ditches and tunnels dug during colonial times. Originally they were used for flood control, but modern dams have controlled flooding and left them dry, so they have been turned into thoroughfares in a city with little surface area. The most important of these roads is Miguel Hidalgo or Belaunzarán, which carried the runoff from the river that used to divide the city in two. Guanajuato's version of the La Llorona story has the woman wandering its tunnels, some of which had rivers or streams running through them.

The streets and alleys of the city are filled with mostly colonial era buildings, restaurants, bars, cafes with terraces and small plazas. Buildings have been constructed of sandstone in pink and green, adobe and other stone, filling the streets with shades of pink, green, ocher and red. Most of these plazas are in front of or to the side of the many churches, such as the Plaza San Fernando, Plaza San Roque, Plaza de la Valenciana, Plaza de los Ángeles, and Plaza de Mexiamora. Exceptions to these are Jardín Reforma and Jardín Unión.

=== The underground tunnels of Guanajuato ===
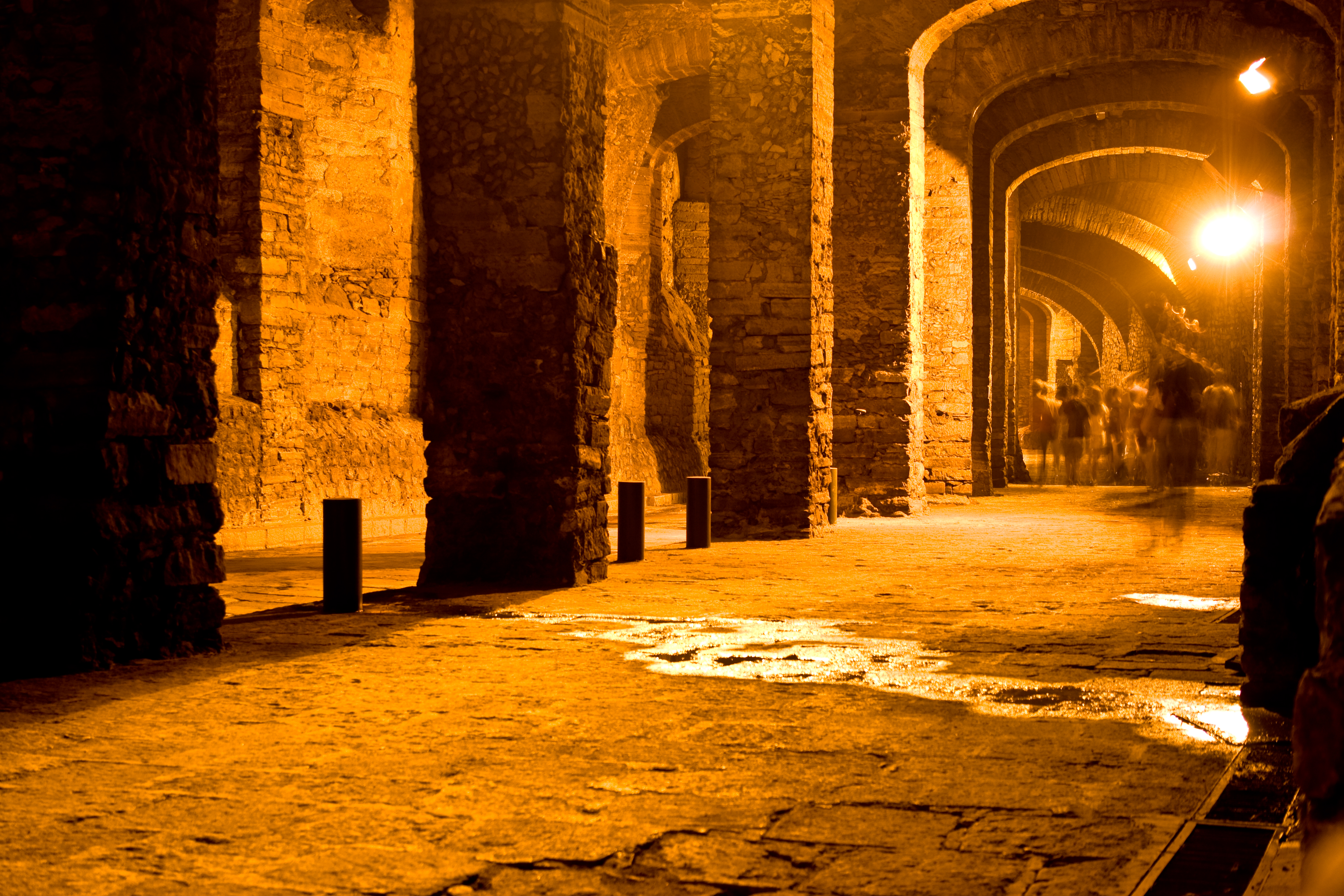
Street tunnel

The Guanajuato underground tunnels are a network of wide channels that help lead traffic away from the city center. These tunnels have different layer crossroads and underground junctions. The tunnels are used for traffic which is heading in an eastwards direction. The westward direction passes through the center of Guanajuato. All of the tunnels have footpaths and even some of the bus stops are subterranean.

While some are recent, the Túnel La Galereña and others opened in the early 1800s, to lead the Guanajuato River away from the center of the city. They now form parts of the underground street system. These tunnel were built to prevent flooding. In the 1960s the old river tunnels were strengthened, as they were in poor condition and showed signs of collapse and subsidence.

The first road journey was completed in 1961. The old tunnels were of a suitable size for cars, medium-sized bus and vans but prevented larger transport getting into the city. A second tunnel was dug during the late 1960s, which diverted the river much deeper. Several additional tunnels were excavated during the 1990s. In addition to traffic, pedestrians can also use the underground streets.

== Mines ==
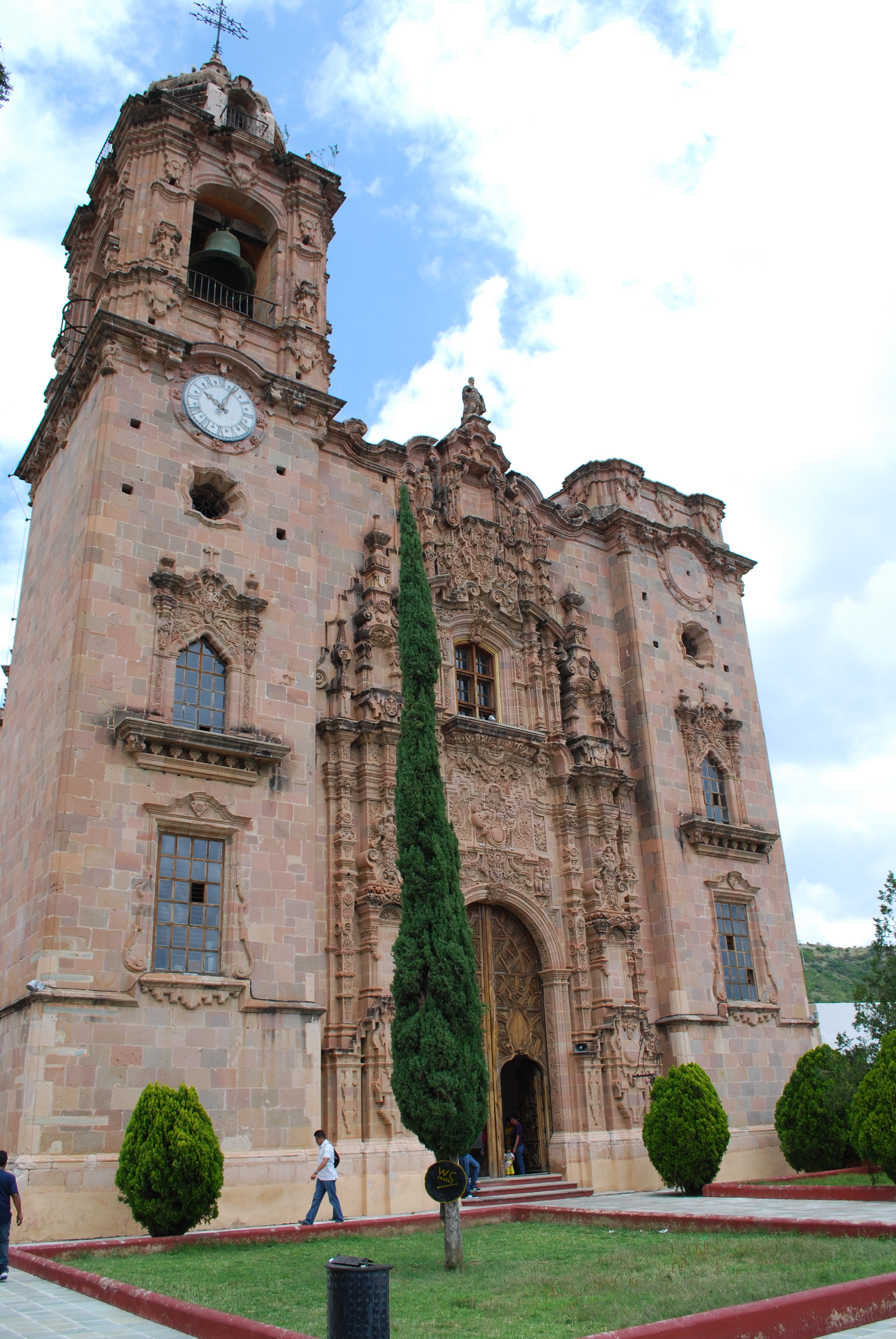
San Cayetano Church near the mine of La Valenciana.

The mines that made Guanajuato rich are inside and just outside the city proper. A number of these mines gave rise to small communities with their own churches; these still exist with other institutions such as museums. The best-known mines gave their names to a number of the city's oldest neighborhoods such as Cata, Rayas y Mellado, La Pastita, San Luisito and Valenciana. Some of these mines are open to the public for tours. The first significant mine was called San Bernabé, which brought thousands of adventurers to Guanajuato and led to the discovery of other mineral deposits. This mine functioned from the 16th century until 1928. The remains of this mine can still be found in the small village of La Luz just outside the city.

The most important of these mining complexes is La Valenciana mine, on the northern edge of the city. It began operation in 1774. From then until the early 19th century it was one of the most productive silver mines in the world, accounting for 2/3 of the world's production at its peak. It produced 80% of all silver mined in the state of Guanajuato and one-sixth of all Mexico. For over 250 years, it produced about 30% of the world's silver. The mine continues operation today. Production is much diminished, but one ton of rock is still extracted every six minutes. The largest shaft descends for 450 meters and about 10,000 miners have worked it over its history.

The mine made its owners, the Counts of Valenciana, extremely wealthy and powerful. The first Count of Valenciana, Antonio de Obregón y Alcocer had the San Cayetano Church (also known as La Valenciana Church) built near the entrance of this mine. Dedicated to Saint Cajetan, it was built between 1765 and 1788. The church has a Churrigueresque portal, which has been compared to the Mexico City Cathedral and La Santisima Church, both in Mexico City. The interior conserves a number of gilded altarpieces and a pulpit that is encrusted with ivory and precious hardwoods. The interior also contains agraffito work and paintings from the 19th century.

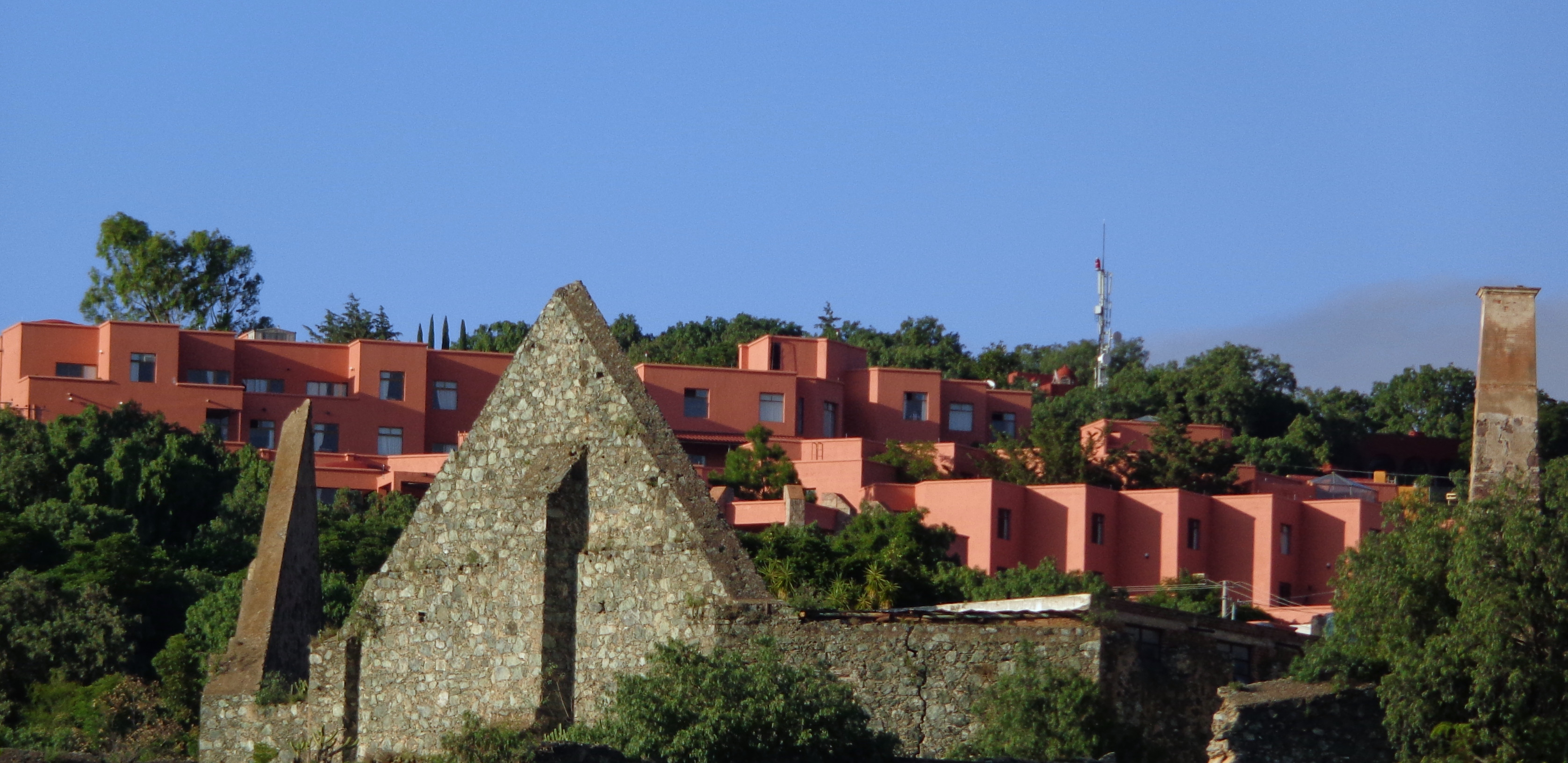
Foreground: Old facilities of La Valenciana. Background: CIMAT.

Near La Valenciana Mine is the Guadalupe Mine, established in the 16th century. This complex was built with extremely large and thick stone walls supported by buttresses, giving it the look of a medieval fortress. The mine is no longer in operation but the complex has been undergoing redevelopment as a resort.

La Cata mine is one of the early mines, and a city neighborhood is named after it. The mine is near Don Quijote Plaza. It began operations in 1558 with peak production in the first quarter of the 18th century. It was owned by the Marquis of San Clemente. The center of the neighborhood is Señor de Villaseca Church, more commonly called La Cata Church. This church was built in the 17th century in Mexican Baroque or Churrigueresque style similar to that of La Valenciana Church. The church holds a valued crucifix called the Señor del Villaseca and is registered as a Mexican Federal Historic Monument.

The Bocamina de San Ramón mine is one of the city's early mines, with the deposit found by some travelers in the early 16th century. In 1548, its mother lode was found. Today, the mine is a tourist attraction in which visitors can descend into the earth through the old shafts. The complex has a patio area, a gallery of minerals and a bar called El Petardo, which once was the gunpowder storage room.

The Rayas mine gave rise to one of the city's original neighborhoods, after having been found in 1550 by Juan Rayas. The mine's apogee occurred in the 18th century, giving its owner, José de Sardineta y Legaspi the titles of Viscount of Sardineta and Marquis of Rayas. Today it is found on a section of the Carretera Panorámica (Panoramic Highway) that circles the city. The complex walls are tall and are held up by stone buttresses. It has one of the longest mine shafts in the world, which extends into the earth for 425 meters.

The Castile of Santa Cecilia is a majestic medieval-style construction built on a former 17th century mining hacienda. The current building functions as a hotel.

== Mummies ==
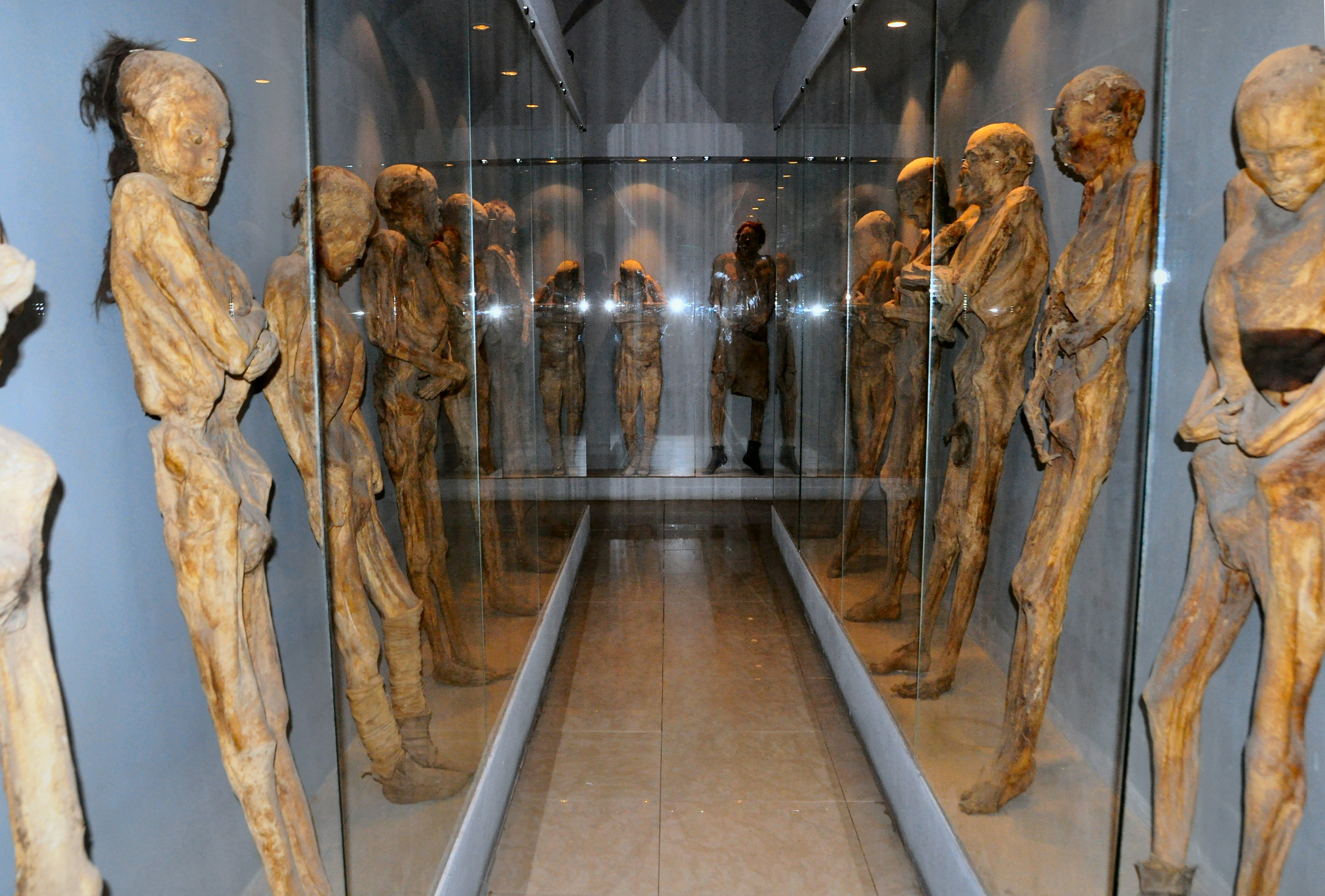
A Mummies of Guanajuato display.

The city's most famous tourist attraction is the Mummies of Guanajuato, which are in their own museum on the side of the municipal cemetery in the Tepetapa neighborhood. The Mummy Museum contains a collection of specimens that mummified naturally in the adjoining cemetery. Authorities began exhuming bodies in 1870, when a new law required residents to pay a tax for perpetual burial. If survivors didn't pay the tax, they exhumed the body. If the body was mummified, they stored it in a building above ground and people began paying to see them in the late 1800s. The burial tax was abolished in 1958. At first, the mummies were displayed in a poorly lit tunnel that visitors entered with a torch or candle. Visitors were allowed to touch the mummies with some even breaking off pieces for souvenirs or to verify the body was real. The modern museum opened in 1970 with proper lighting and ventilation, and the mummies protected behind glass.

The collection contains 111 mummies, mostly women, with some men and about 20 children, but only 59 of these are on display. It is considered the largest collection of mummies in the Western Hemisphere. Almost all of the people were commoners and came from backgrounds such as miners and farmers. The mummies were disinterred from the municipal cemetery between 1870 and 1958, and were people who died between 1850 and 1950. The first of the documented mummies, which has been on display in one form or another since the 1870s, is that of a French doctor named Remigio Leroy. He can be seen at the current museum. Of the children in the collection, one can see evidence of a practice where deceased Catholic children were dressed as angels, if girls, or as saints, if boys, to indicate their purity and assured entrance into heaven. Several are babies, including one considered the smallest mummy in the world. Two of these small bodies were partially embalmed by taking out internal organs and replacing the cavities with packing material. One was a fetus, which probably miscarried at about 24 weeks, and the other is a newborn male infant. This embalming process may have enhanced the natural mummification process but was not the cause. It is not known why these had been embalmed, nor are their years of death exactly known. There is a mummy of a woman who died in childbirth or miscarriage (a dried placenta is attached to her) but it is not known if she is the mother of either of these mummified children.

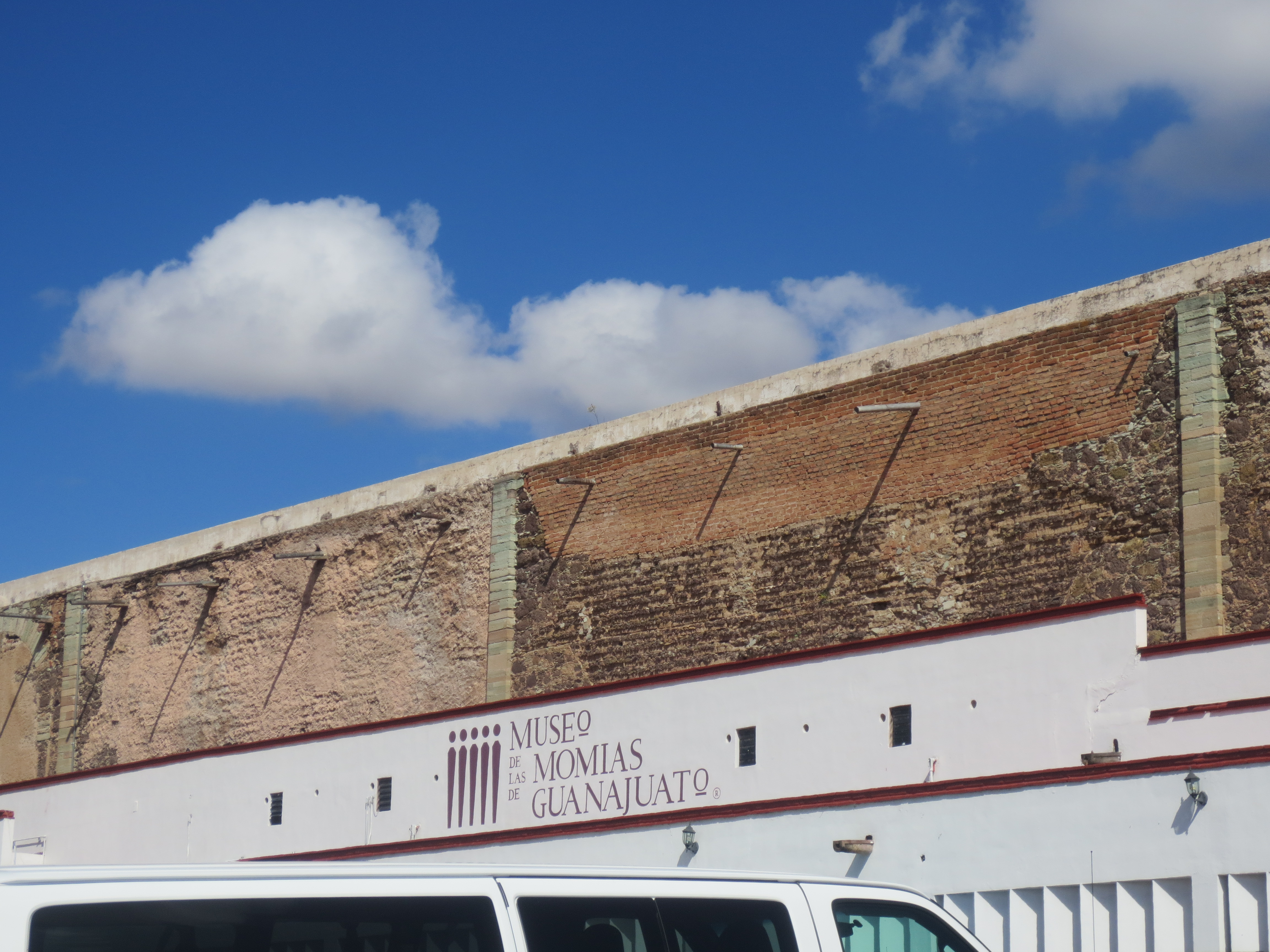
View of the entrance to the Mummies of Guanajuato Museum. Above is a wall separating it from the cemetery.

Although only one out of every 100 bodies interred in the cemetery became naturally mummified, the concentration of this phenomenon has led to theories about how they have come about. Some believe that they are the result of people who had been buried alive, after being mistakenly declared dead. These people, according to belief, died of desperation and asphyxiation and as a sign of their pain, convert into mummies. More commonly, it is likely the result of Guanajuato's altitude or the abundance of minerals in the soil. However, all of the mummified remains were found in the cemetery's above ground cement crypts, not in underground graves. Researchers believe the phenomenon is due to the warm, dry climate of the area, which dried out the bodies rapidly.

One of the main reasons for the mummies' fame in Mexico is the 1972 film El Santo contra las momias de Guanajuato, which featured Mexico's most famous lucha libre wrestler, El Santo, as well as two others called Blue Demon and Mil Máscaras. In this movie, the mummies are reanimated by a wrestler known as "Satán" and El Santo fights to defeat them. It was filmed in the Guanajuato cemetery and has since become a cult classic.

A mayor of the city, Dr. Eduardo Hicks, initiated the Guanajuato Mummy Research Project in 2007 to increase knowledge and awareness of the specimens. They have since been extensively studied in Mexico and the United States. The study has found evidence of medical conditions such as rheumatoid arthritis, extreme anemia lung damage from smoke inhalation and tuberculosis. Some of the research looked into the folklore surrounding a number of the mummies such as the man with a misshapen face thought to have been caused by a mortal blow, a woman who was supposedly hanged by her husband and a woman who is thought to have been buried alive. No scientific evidence has been found to support the last two stories. Without records, it is not possible to know exactly when some mummies died. Carbon 14 cannot help because it has a margin of error of 50 years and it is already known that the mummies died between 1850 and 1950. In 2009, 36 of the mummies were displayed for the first time outside of Mexico, at the Detroit Science Center in the United States as part of a tour to last until 2012. They have been the focus of a National Geographic documentary series called "The Mummy Road Show," which covered 18 of the mummies.

== Festival Cervantino ==
Guanajuato during the International Cervantino Festival.

The world-famous Festival Internacional Cervantino is an annual cultural event, held in the city of Guanajuato, which sponsors a large number of artistic and cultural events with artists invited from Mexico and all over the world. The event is named in honor of Miguel de Cervantes, author of Don Quixote. The festival began in 1972, as short plays performed by University of Guanajuato students based on the works of Cervantes. In 2010, special guests included the state of Querétaro and the country of Colombia. The 2010 edition of the festival included performers such as Tangokineses from Argentina and Cumbia Cienaguera from Colombia. In total there were 424 events over 26 days.

Traditional "tuna" or "estudiantina" band. A form of rondalla serenade widely practiced by students in Guanajuato.

The festival hosts events such as opera, theater productions, film showings, art exhibitions, academic conferences and talks, concerts and dance recitals. The performances occur in 70 venues over most of the month of October. Events are held throughout the city, with some in other locations such as Mexico City, Guadalajara and San Miguel de Allende. The most important venue in Guanajuato for the festival is Juárez Theater, which is located close to Jardín de la Unión (Union Garden). Other important venues in the city are Teatro Principal, Cervantes Theater and facilities of the University of Guanajuato. Events are also held in area churches, plazas and even on the streets. Festival International Cervantino Callejero is a parallel event sponsored by Centro Libre de Experimentación Teatral y Artística (CLETA). In 2010, this event featured 300 performances with social themes. This annual event was begun in 1975, inspired in part by The Beatles' Abbey Road album cover.

== Landmarks ==
=== Area around Plaza de la Paz, Basilica and the Legislative Palace ===
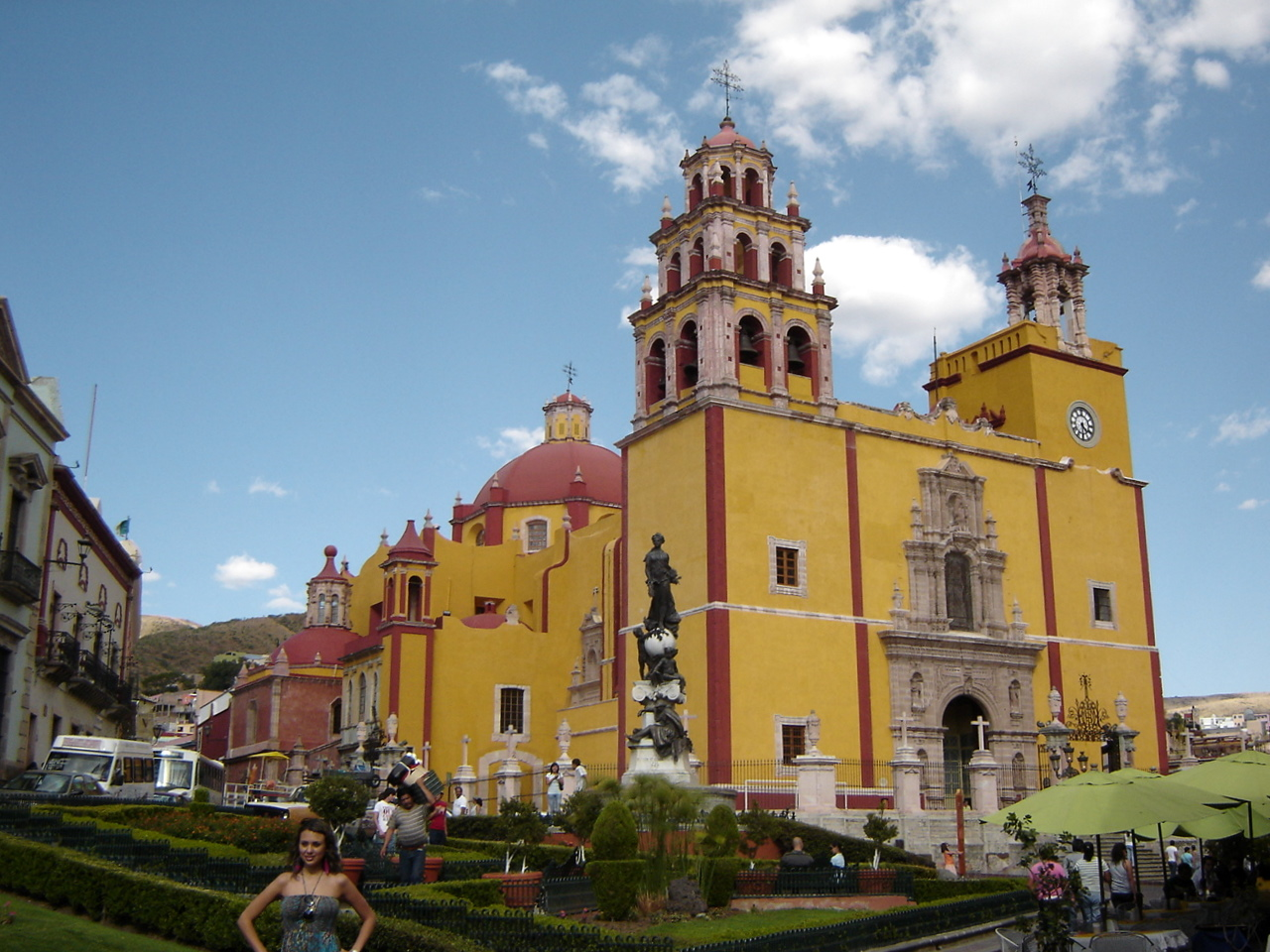
Plaza de la Paz and the Basílica colegiata de Nuestra Señora de Guanajuato (2009).

The center of the modern city is Plaza de la Paz (Plaza of Peace), also known as Plaza Mayor (Main Plaza). Since the colonial period, the richest of the city's families built their main homes here, along with government buildings and the parish church, now a basilica. This plaza is a garden with a sculpture of a woman representing peace; its placement here in the late 19th century caused the official name to change to Plaza de la Paz. Today, the plaza is surrounded by the basilica, other churches, and governmental and commercial buildings, many of which were once mansions. Still remaining around the plaza are mansions that belonged to local nobility such as the Counts of Rul, Count of Gálvez, and the Count De los Chico. The Rul house was constructed at the end of the 18th century by architect Francisco Eduardo Tresguerras. It is noted for its inner courtyard, with architectural features from ancient Greece. Alexander von Humboldt stayed here in 1803. Later, the house became known as Palacio de Otero. The Casa Real de Ensaye is a Baroque mansion that, on its façade, bears the first noble coat of arms granted in Guanajuato.

The main church of the city is Basílica Colegiata de Nuestra Señora de Guanajuato built between 1671 and 1696. Overall, the church is a sober Mexican Baroque in style but there are popular elements from donations made by the area's miners, and other elements that demonstrate the influence of several of the city's rich mining nobility. The Marquis of San Clemente and Pedro Lascuráin de Retana were the current building's first patrons. Later, the Counts of Valenciana left their influence as well with the donation of a clock for one of the towers and the acquisition of relics related to a saint and martyr named Faustina obtained from the Pope. These relics are in the main altar. The main portal is made of pink sandstone with “estipite” or inverted truncated pyramidal columns. The focus of the main altar is the image of Our Lady of Guanajuato (Nuestra Señora de Guanajuato), who is the patroness of the city. She was donated to the city by Carlos I and his son Felipe II in 1557. In 1696, the church gained minor basilica status and full basilica status in 1957.

The Legislative Palace or state government building was the site of the Aduana or Casas Consistoriales (customs house) in the colonial period. The current building was constructed by Cecilio Luis Long in a European style popular in the late 19th and early 20th centuries and inaugurated in 1903.The façade has a Neoclassical portal in sandstone of colors typical of the Guanajuato area. It contains the legislative chamber called the Sala de Sessiones, decorated with 19th- and 20th-century paintings and somber furniture.

=== Alhóndiga de Granaditas ===
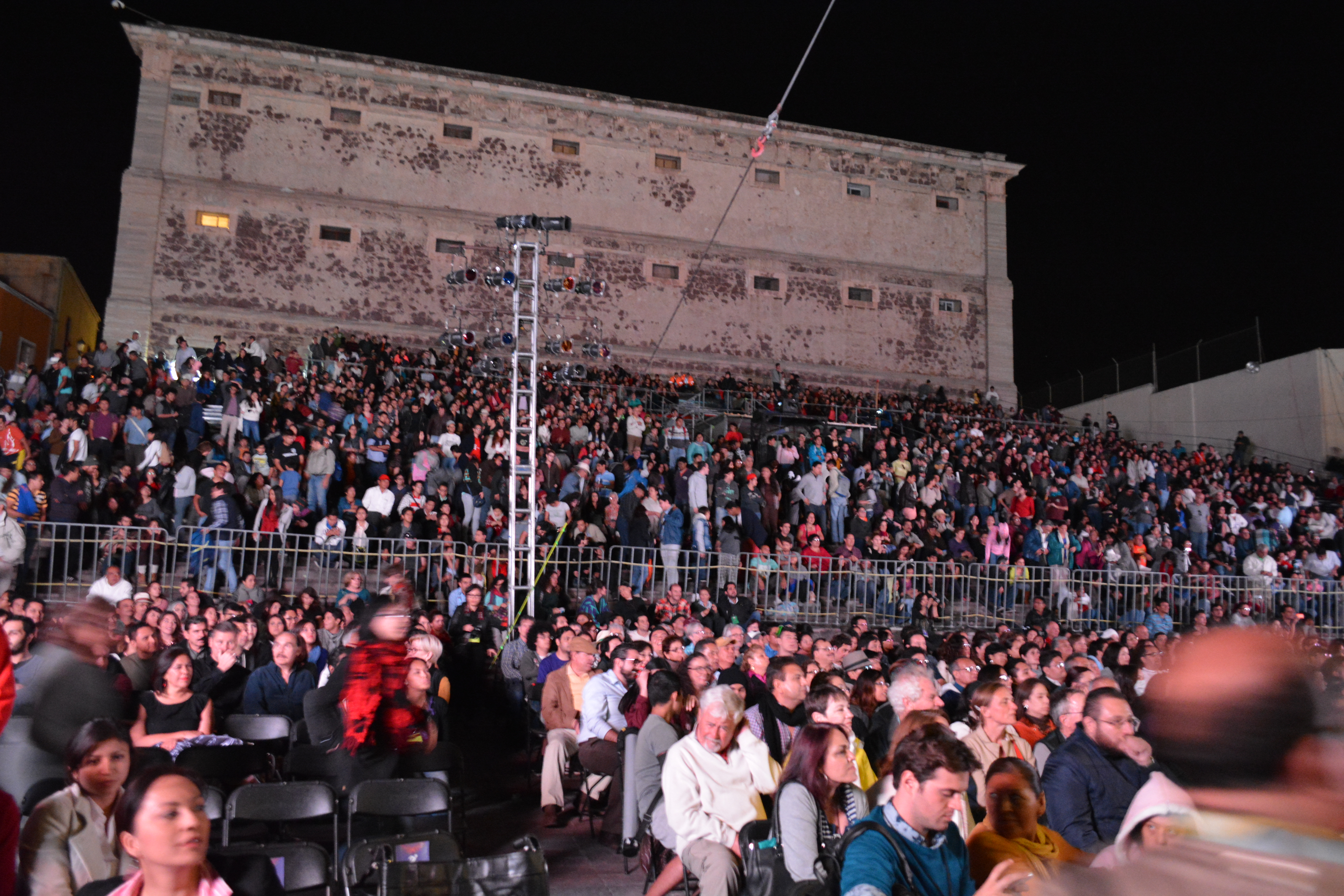
Historical monument of Alhóndiga de Granaditas for a night concert during the Cervantino Festival.

Alhóndiga de Granaditas is a very large building covering an entire block. It was originally built to store enough grain to feed the city for a year to protect the population against famines such as those that occurred in 1783, due to crop failure. This gave the building its name, which roughly translates to "house of grain." The building is two floors, nearly windowless with a very large courtyard in its interior. Construction began in 1798 under an architect named Durán y Villaseñor and terminated under José del Mazo.

The Alhóndiga only served its original function for eight months after it was built. The main reason for its importance today is that it was the site of the first battle of the Mexican War of Independence between insurgents and royalist troops on September 28, 1810. When Miguel Hidalgo, Ignacio Allende and the insurgent army approached the city, royalist troops under Lieutenant Riaño and the city's elite took refuge in the building, along with millions of pesos of silver and other loot. The insurgents quickly surrounded the building, but the building proved difficult to penetrate due to the lack of openings and royalist gunfire.

The battle remained a stalemate until a miner from San Miguel de Allende devised a way to approach the building's main entrance. This miner, whose name was Juan José de los Reyes Martínez, is better known as El Pípila, who had joined the insurgent army as it passed through his hometown. El Pípila strapped a large flat stone over his back and, carrying a flask of tar and a torch, crawled towards the main entrance. The stone protected him from the bullets fired at him. When he reached the heavy wooden door of the entrance, he smeared it with tar and lit it. This allowed insurgents to then take the building.

After the battle it was used as barracks, a tenement and tobacco warehouse. From 1864 to 1949, it was used as the state penitentiary. In 1949 the building was converted into the Museo Regional de Guanajuato, documenting the history of the area and its role in Mexican national history from the pre-Hispanic period to the present divided among fourteen halls on the upper floor. On the ground floor there are large mascarons of José Mariano Jiménez, Vicente Guerrero, Ignacio Allende and Ignacio Aldama. The main hall has mascarons of Miguel Hidalgo and José María Morelos y Pavón who "guard" the national coat of arms. In front of this is an eternal flame that is renewed each September 28. The walls of the main stairwell contain mural work by José Chávez Morado that alludes to Independence. It houses a large collection of ceramics from western parts of Mesoamerica, especially from Chupícuaro. It contains works by Guanajuato artist Hermeneguildo Bustos and photographer Romualdo García. There are displays related to the building itself, to its construction, its original function as a granary and its role in one of the first battles of the War of Independence. The large courtyard within the Alhóndiga is a traditional place to celebrate Mexico's Independence Day with the reenactment of Miguel Hidalgo's "El Grito de Dolores." It is one of the sites for a number of the events of the Festival Cervantino. The museum was restored in 2010 for the Bicentennial by the INAH at a cost of 5.7 million pesos as part of similar museums in Dolores Hidalgo and San Miguel de Allende to form the Ruta de Independencia (Independence Route). The work was the first renovation of the building in 20 years.

=== University of Guanajuato ===
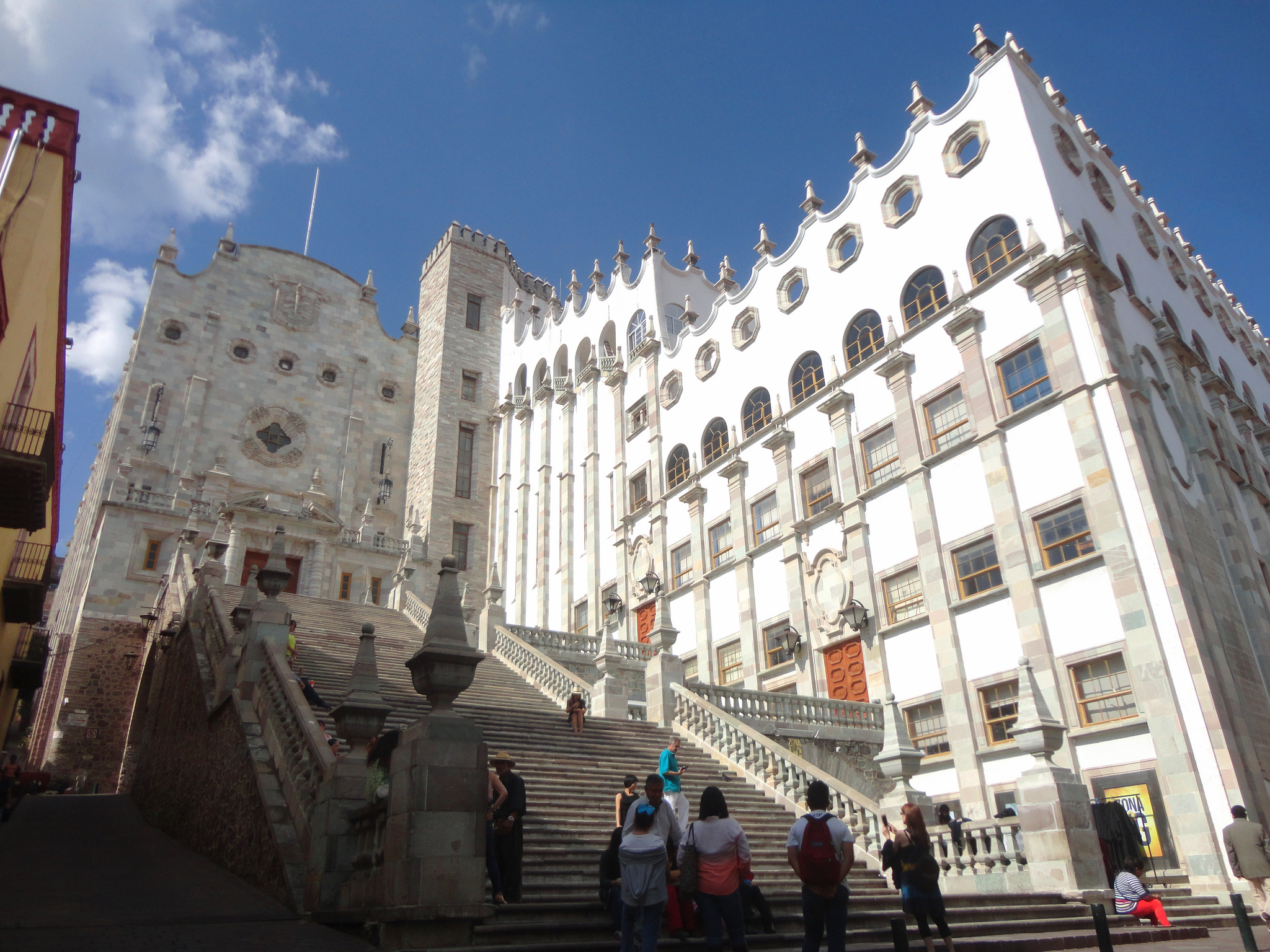
University of Guanajuato

The University of Guanajuato began as a Jesuit school for children in the first half of the 18th century. The establishment of this school was sponsored by Josefa Teresa de Busto y Moya, sister of the Marquis of San Clemente, who obtained permission for the school from the Spanish Crown in 1732 and established the institution in her home. She donated a fifth of her fortune toward it and worked to obtain donations from other wealthy families in the city. However, credit for the establishment of the school is most often given to Jesuits. Over time, the school grew and began to offer high school and professional level studies. It held several names over its history, from Real Colegio de la Purísima Concepción (1767), Colegio del Estado (1828), Colegio Nacional de Guanajuato (1867), with its current name adopted in 1945. The Colegio del Estado name was prompted by the fact that the institution became the property of the state in 1828. In 1945, it gained university status.

Today the institution serves approximately 30,000 students at the high school, bachelor's and graduate levels. In addition to the main campus in the city, there are nine others in other parts of Guanajuato state. The university hosts a number of the events of the Festival Cervantino, with its famous stairway acting as seating. The best known facility of the institution is the main building in Guanajuato city, which was built in Neoclassical style in green stone. It houses the dean's office, administrative offices and a number of the institution's departments. The main building is recognized by its long staircase with 113 steps, which empties onto the Callejón del Estudiante. Under the main roof is a 16th-century chapel that was sponsored by Vasco de Quiroga for indigenous mine workers. It's called the Templo de los Hospitales (Temple of the Hospitals). It received the image of the Virgin of the Rosary, now called the Nuestra Señora de Guanajuato.

The Museo de Historia Natural Alfredo Dugès is on the ground floor of the University of Guanajuato's main building. It contains a national-level collection of fossils, plants and animals. The importance of this collection comes from its state of conservation and its age. The collection was gathered by Alfredo Dugés and donated to the university.

=== Other plazas and churches ===
The city is dotted with a large number of small plazas or squares that were built along with the churches that usually gave them their names. One of the best-known plazas or open spaces is Jardín de la Unión, on the south side of San Diego Church. The garden is filled with carefully pruned Indian laurels and, in addition to the church, is surrounded by small cafes, restaurants, and Juárez Theater. It occupies a triangular space that originally was the church atrium. In 1883, wrought iron benches and a kiosk were installed. Today, concerts are held in this kiosk on occasion. It is popular with wandering student musicians performing callejoneadas and functions as the atrium of San Diego Church. This church has a Churrigueresque façade. The interior has paintings from the 18th century, Neoclassical altarpieces and a crucifix called Cristo de Burgos, which was donated to the church by the Count of Valenciana. The current church was built between 1780 and 1784 by the Count of Valenciana after the original was destroyed by a flood. In the 19th century, its original gilded altarpieces were replaced with the current Neoclassical ones. The monastery, which was also destroyed, was never rebuilt, but the site is now home to San Diego Museum. It was created to rescue and display the cultural inheritance of the city, describing its development and changes from its beginnings to the present day. It also contains a computer simulation of what the original monastery looked like.

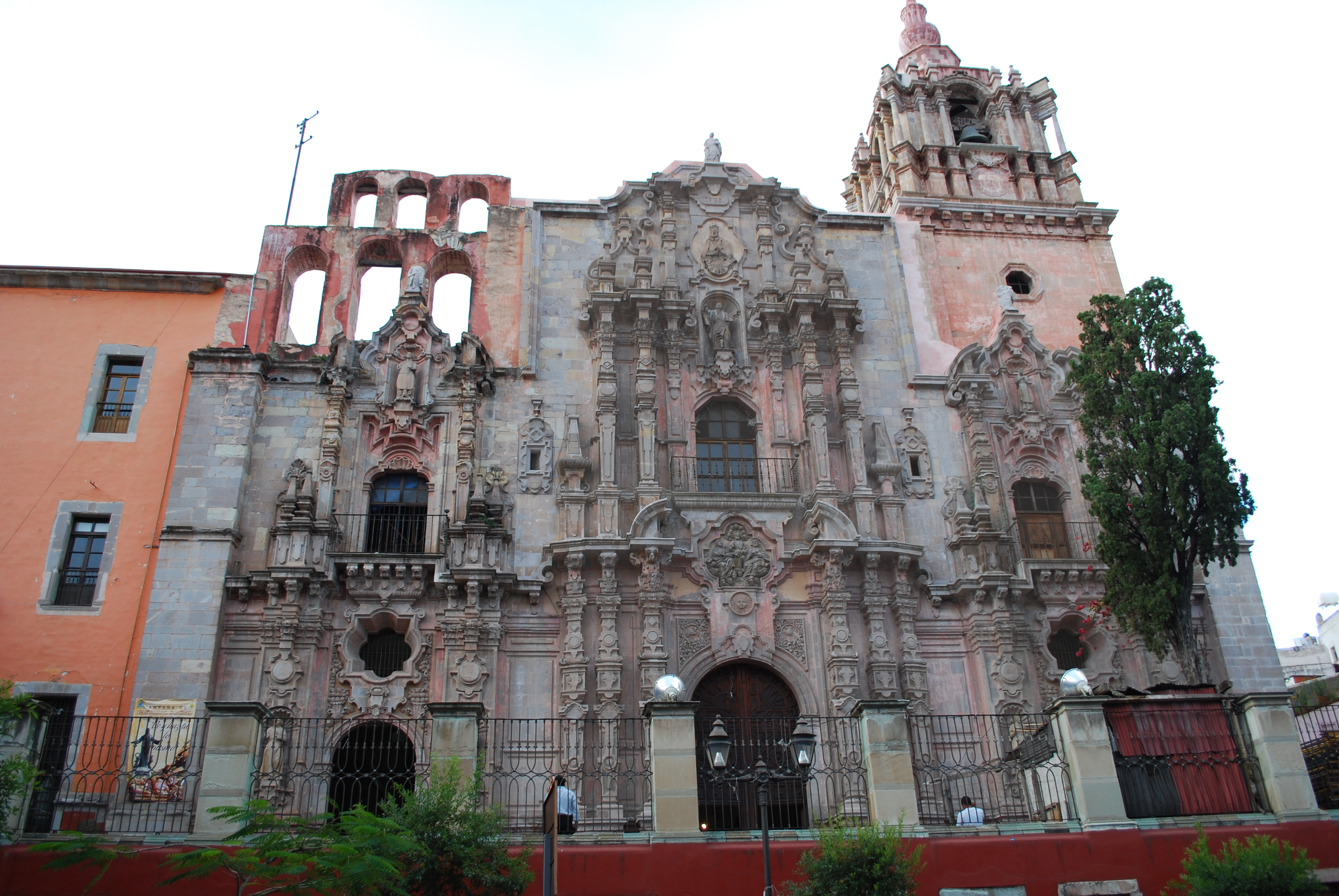
Church of La Compañía.

Located next to the university, the Templo de la Compañía de Jesús (Temple of the Society of Jesus), or Oratorio de San Felipe (commonly known as "La Compañía"), was built in 1746 by José Joaquín Sardaneta y Legazpi. It was completed in 1767, the same year that the Jesuits were expelled from New Spain. The new church remained abandoned until 1804, when the order was allowed to return and reclaim it. The order then worked to renovate the church, replacing Baroque elements with Neoclassical ones, which were then in fashion. It has a façade with narrow estipite columns in Churrigueresque style, but its more famous aspect is a colossal cupola with three levels, which was added in the 19th century by architect Vicente Heredia. Inside, a collection of 180 paintings were recently studied and restored. Some of these paintings are displayed in the church complex, while the rest are kept in a pinacotheca created for the purpose. The main altar and the paintings are by Miguel Cabrera.

Dating from 1726, the oldest plaza still in existence is Plaza de Baratillo. The name comes from a weekly market, once held on Sundays. This market specialized in low prices (baratillo means "very cheap"). In the center is a fountain brought from Florence, Italy. This fountain once provided area residents with potable water from the Olla Dam. Today, it is purely ornamental.

Another important area of the historic center is the San Roque plaza and church. There is a stone cross, which indicates the ground was once used as a cemetery. Starting in the 1950s, this plaza was used for short one-act plays called Entremeses Cervantinos, which later developed into the Festival Cervantino. The plaza is still used for these plays as well as events associated with the annual event. San Roque Church dates from 1726. It has a sober Baroque façade and contains an important collection of colonial era paintings.

Other important churches include the Temple of Guadalupe from the 18th century in sober Baroque, and El Pardo Church from the 18th century with a façade covered with sculpted plants. San Francisco Church on Sopeña Street faces a plaza with the same name. It has a Baroque façade of pink stone with a green tint, a staircase with wrought iron railings and a small fountain. Belén Church was built in the 18th century by the Count of Valenciana with a modest façade. It is across from Hidalgo Market and on the street leading to Alhóndiga de Granaditas. El Mellado Church was part of La Merced Monastery. The cloister area is now in ruins but the church remains and is dedicated to the veneration of Our Lady of Mercy. The original Baroque altarpieces were replaced with Neoclassical ones in the 19th century.

Jardín Reforma or Reforma Square was originally a market, built in 1861. When Hidalgo Market opened, most vendors moved out. In 1923, the site was renovated into a garden with a central fountain and Indian laurel, eucalyptus and cypress trees. Jardín Reforma has an arched entryway with a series of thin columns.

Plaza del Quijote is at the old San Antonio bridge and to the side of San Diego Church. The plaza was created to honor the 400th anniversary of the first edition of Don Quixote of La Mancha in 1605.

=== Other civil constructions ===
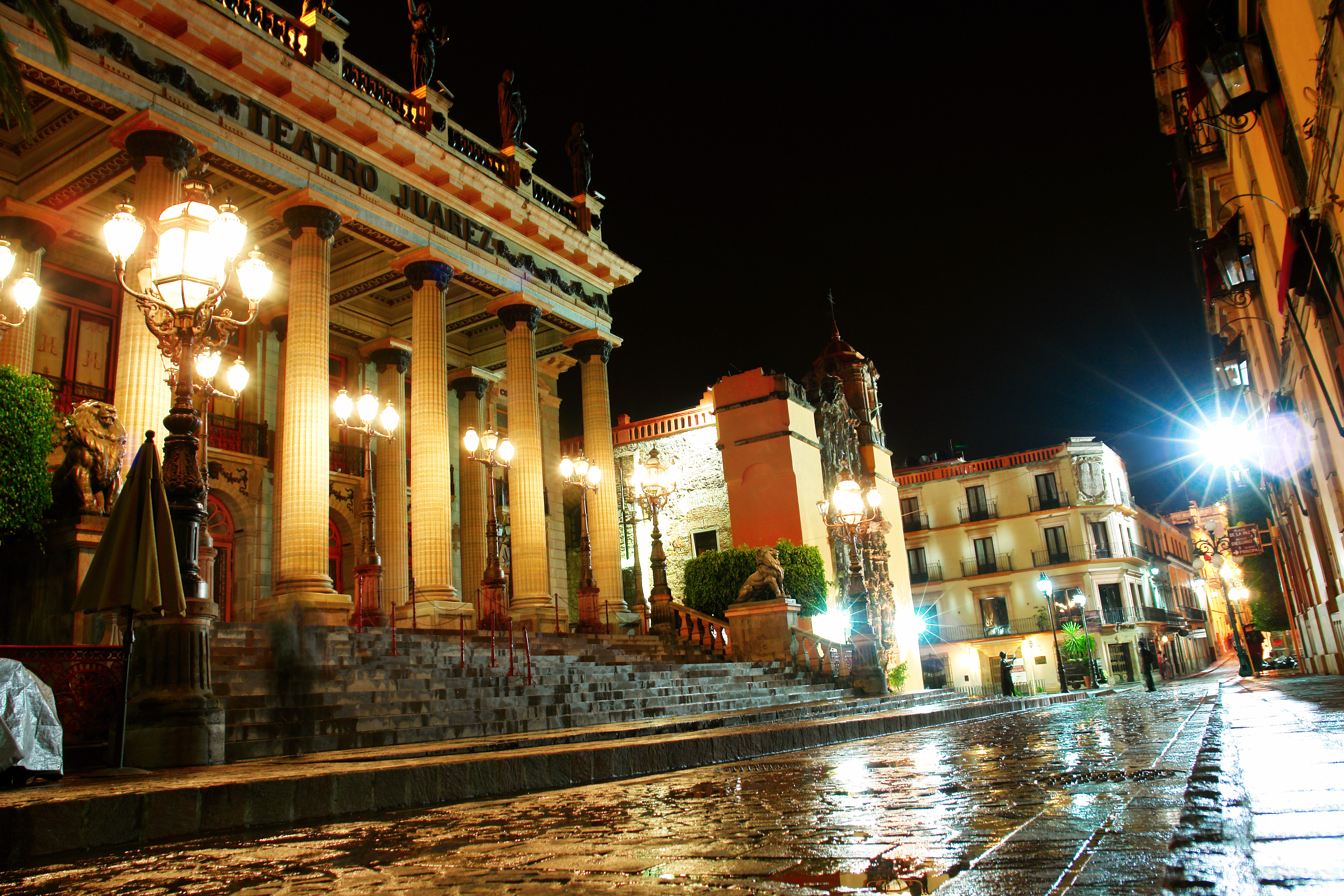
Teatro Juárez

The Juárez Theater (Teatro Juárez) is located across from the San Diego Church in the city's downtown. It is one of the main venues of the Cervantino Festival. It is considered one of the most beautiful theaters in the country, according to Mexico Desconocido. It was built from 1872 to 1903 and is in Neoclassical style with a façade containing nine sculptures depicting the Muses of Greek mythology.

The south façade has a lintel with the word "Tragedia" on it and on the north façade, the matching lintel reads "Comedia." The interior has an eclectic design richly decorated. The vestibule or foyer (also called the Smoking Room) has columns and garlands. The auditorium is Mauresque with Arabesque detail throughout. The curtain contains an image of Constantinople. The theater was built from 1872 to 1903 by Antonio Rivas Mercado, who designed the Angel of Independence monument in Mexico City, and was inaugurated with the opera Aida by Giuseppe Verdi with President Porfirio Díaz in attendance. It is the only theater in the country that has conserved its original furnishings.

On the side of Juárez Theater, there is Rincón del Arte. Next to this is a cable car that rises up to the Pípila Monument on San Miguel Hill. The monument honors the insurgent who managed to torch the main entrance of Alhóndiga de Granaditas. The monument consists of a giant statue of El Pípila raising a torch over his head. Around the monument, there is an esplanade and overlook which permits a panoramic view of nearly the entire city.

Teatro Principal (Main Theater) was built at the city's height when the wealth of the mines attracted entertainers. It was the first theater in the city, built in Neoclassical style and one of the few places where people of different social strata could enter. The theater closed periodically during its early history due to sociopolitical upheavals. After the Mexican Revolution, it was converted into a movie theater. Shortly after this, it suffered a fire and closed for 30 years. Today, it is reconstructed and run by the University of Guanajuato as one of the main venues of the Cervantino Festival.

Unlike other theaters in the city, which were stage theaters converted into movie houses at one point or another, Cervantes Theater was a movie house that was converted into a stage theater. It is used for puppet shows, dance recitals, experimental theater and conferences.

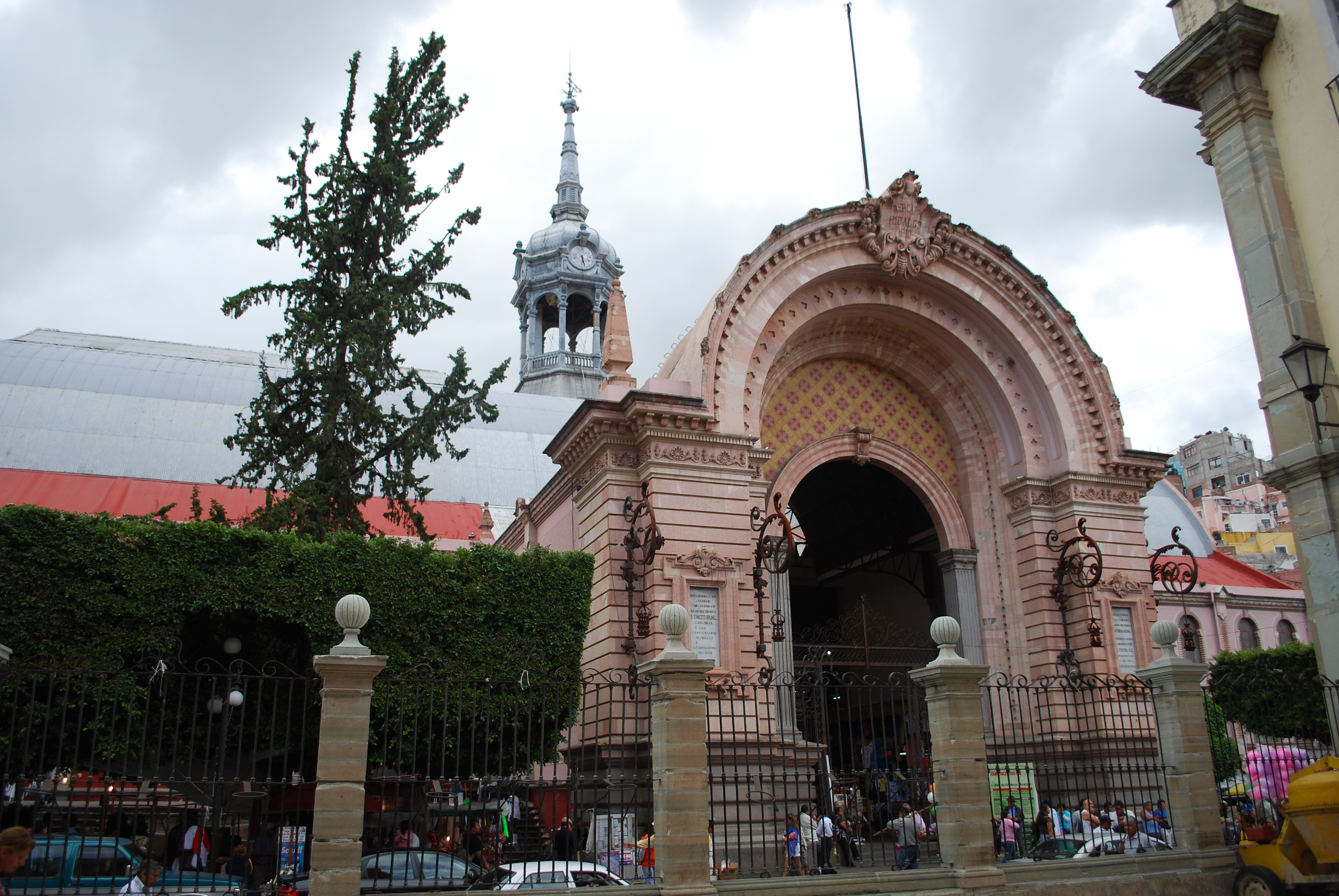
Hidalgo Market

Hidalgo Market was built by Ernesto Brunel in 1910 over what was the site of the old Gavira bullring. It was inaugurated by President Porfirio Díaz to celebrate Mexico's Centennial of Independence. The roof has a cupola with a clock tower. The clock has four faces. The interior of the market is a giant metallic nave. The market sells typical candies of the region such as "charamuscas," which are often shaped as a charro or mummy and wrapped in wax paper. The upper floor of the market contains a large number of crafts and souvenir shops containing products such as baskets, knit items, ceramics, leathercrafts and more. The ground floor has many everyday items such as fresh and packaged food, household goods, wickerwork and hardware.

Museo del Pueblo de Guanajuato was created to exhibit the best of the artwork of the city. It contains an important collection of religious art from the 17th to 19th centuries. It contains collections of works by Olga Costa and José Chávez Morado. This includes three murals by Chávez Morado set up as altars. These murals depict the end of the colonial period and the War of Independence.

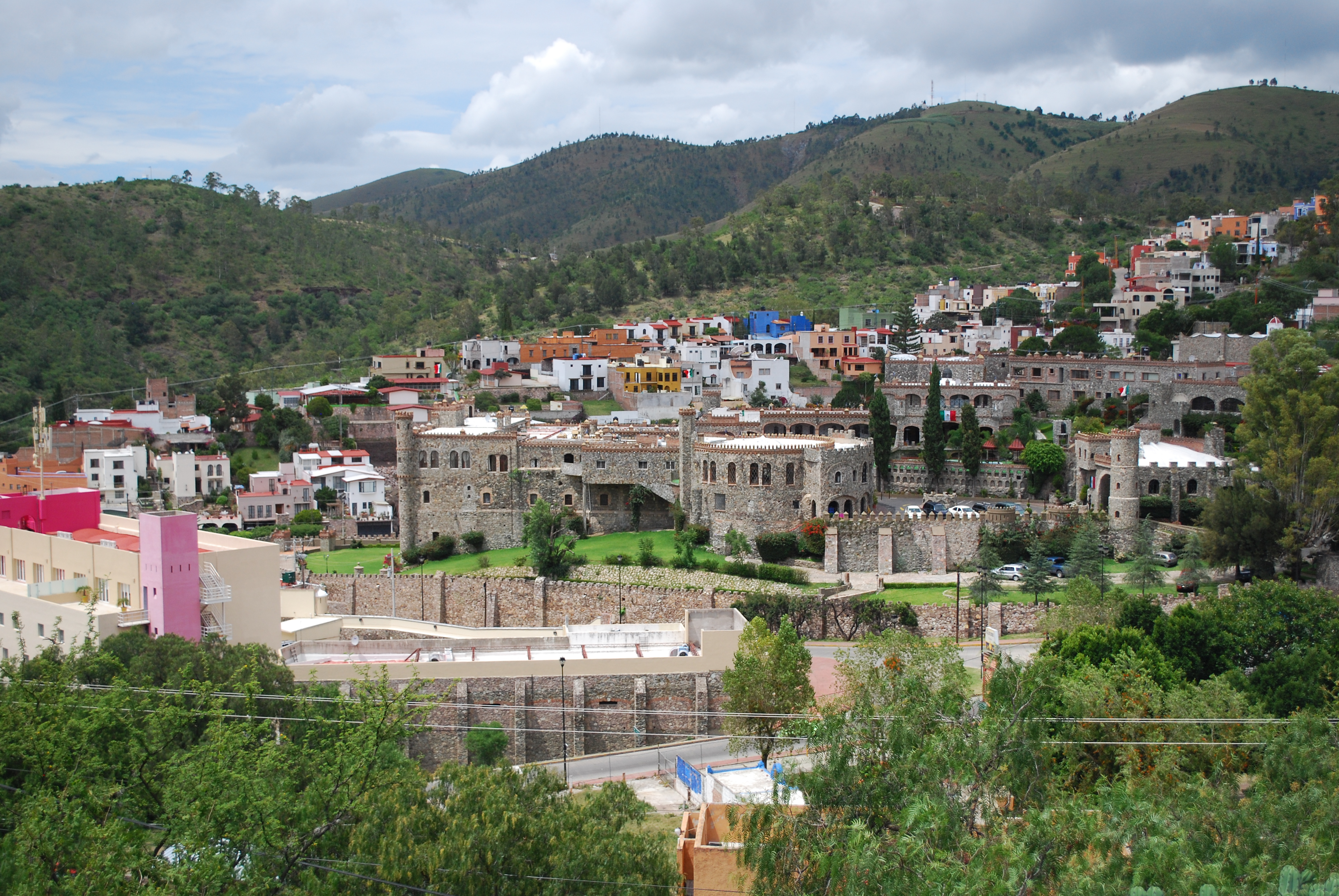
Santa Cecilia Castle

Diego Rivera Museum was the house where the painter was born and spent his early childhood. The first floor is dedicated to furniture and other items from the late 19th century. The floors above contain a large collection of paintings, about 100 of which are Rivera's early and little known works. It has workshops for arts, literary events, film showings and other cultural activities.

Very near Jardín Unión, on Luis González Obregón Street is Casa de Gobierno, where Benito Juárez made the city the temporary capital of Mexico. Next to Casa de Gobierno is Real Caja de Guanajuato, which dates from 1665. It was the scene of the naming of the first authorities of a Mexico declared liberated from Spanish rule. Later it was used as a women's prison and teachers' college.

Museo Iconográfico del Quijote is on Manuel Doblado Street. It was created in 1987 to honor Don Quixote. The museum contains visual representations of the character, including some created by notable artists such as Pedro Coronel, José Guadalupe Posada and Salvador Dalí.

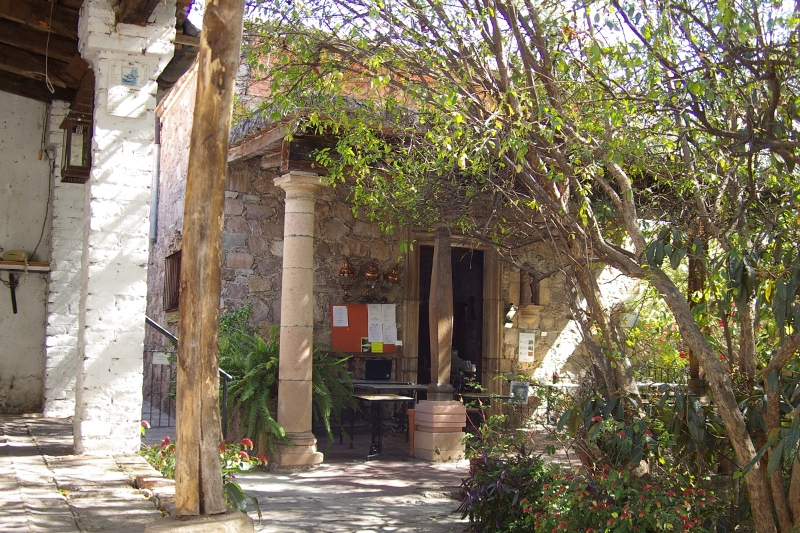
Casa Museo Gene Byron

Museo de Arte Olga Costa y José Chávez Morado is in Pastita neighborhood, installed in a building in the former Guadalupe Hacienda. This was the home of the two artists, who donated the structure and their personal art collection to the city after their deaths. The collection contains their own works as well as works by a number of other artists.

Casa Museo Gene Byron, in the suburb of Marfil, was the former Santa Ana Hacienda and belonged to Canadian artist Gene Byron. Byron began studying Mexican muralists in 1941, but her work was also influenced by contemporary Spanish artists. She and her husband settled in Guanajuato in 1958, and took over this ex-hacienda in 1962. Today the grounds are a cultural center that hosts art exhibitions, theatrical productions, concerts, and book presentations.

Estadio José Aguilar y Maya is a Baseball Stadium in the City.

== Municipality ==
As the seat of a municipality, the city of Guanajuato is the local government for over 373 communities, which cover an area of 1,014 square kilometres (391.51 square miles). The total population of the municipality is 194,500. This municipality is in Region I in the northeast of the state. It borders the municipalities of San Felipe, Dolores Hidalgo, Salamanca, Irapuato, Silao and León.

Most of the territory is covered by Sierra of Guanajuato also called Sierra of San Gregorio. Principal elevations include Santa Rosa, Chichíndaro, Sirena, Bufa Picacho and Bufa Peñón all near the city. Others include La Giganta, El Gigante, Los Llanitos and Vaquería in the east and north. These peaks average 2,400 metres (7,874 feet) above sea level. The territory is filled with small streams, arroyos, and rivers, which wind around the steep mountains. These include El Cedeño, La Goya, La Hernia, El Salto and La Cebada.

Ecosystems vary from low rainforest that loses leaves in the dry season, to areas with trees never exceeding 15 meters, grassland and temperate forest, some dominated by trees of the Prosopis family. In most areas, small mammals such as skunks, tlacuache, rabbits, and badgers dominate—with coyotes and deer found in isolated areas. Reptiles such as rattlesnakes, frogs, and lizards can be found, as well as some bird and insect species.

According to INEGI, the only indigenous language spoken in the municipality is Nahuatl and only by 330 people. Almost all of the municipality's residents profess the Catholic faith, with most of those who do not following a Protestant or Evangelical Christian creed.

Under 50% of the municipality's population is economically active, but of these very few are unemployed. Commerce and services employ the largest number of people followed by construction and mining. Agriculture is extremely limited due to the very rugged terrain. However, some crops of sorghum, alfalfa, peanuts and fruits are produced. Livestock is produced on a very small scale and includes cattle, goats and sheep. Mining is the economic activity that spurred the founding of the city. However, extraction of minerals today is minimal, with gold and silver ores almost exhausted. Kaolin and lead are still mined. Principal mining companies include Las Torres, Santa Fe de Guanajuato and El Cubo. The most important segments of the economy now are tourism and commerce. The city's rich cultural and artistic heritage, along with its colonial area constructions, are what attract visitors. For the rural areas around the city, it is the place to shop for supplies not available at home. This includes foods, auto parts and service, banking services and more.

Cerro de la Bufa is very close to the city of Guanajuato and has a number of stories associated with it. At sunset, there is a formation that looks like the profile of the face of a bearded man. According to tradition, this is the face of Christ. There are two caves consecrated to Ignatius of Loyola. They are on opposite sides of the summit and called the “old” and “new” cave. Each July 31, there is a pilgrimage to the “new” cave in honor of the saint. Sometime during the colonial period, an image of Ignatius was painted on a wall. According to legend, a group of male witches used to use the cave for their rites on the eve before the Catholic ritual, “forcing” the image on the wall to observe. Cerro de la Bufa is home to another legend about an enchanted princess. It states that on feast days, a woman would appear to a man on a road in the mountain and ask him to carry her to the Basilica in the city center in his arms. If he did so, the city of Guanajuato would return to the height of its wealth. If he chose to do so, noises and threats from behind would haunt him. If he lost his resolve, the woman would turn into a serpent and kill him. No woman has ever been carried from this mountain to the Basilica.

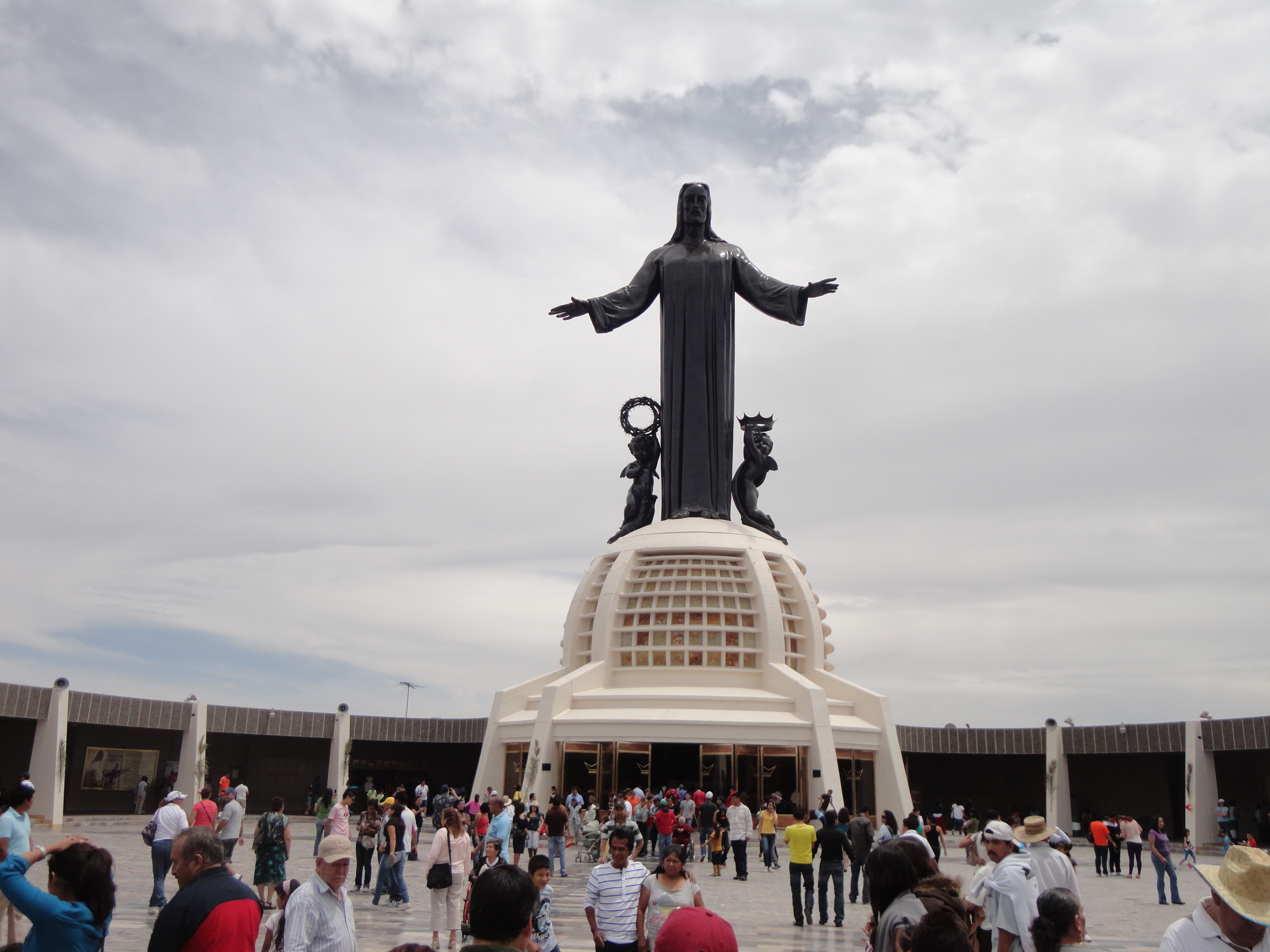
Cristo Rey del Cubilete.

Presa de la Olla is a dam that was constructed in the mid 18th century to supply the city with potable water. The area became a popular gathering place for young aristocrats, and later the lower classes as well. The area hosts the Feast of San Juan every June 24. The origin of this event dates from the colonial period when a poor miner came here to give thanks for the recent arrival of rains. The current event culminates with the “opening of the dam,” which attracts hundreds to watch the water flow. Today, the event stretches over the second and third week in June and has taken on new elements such as a beauty contest and dances with techno, reggaetón, Duranguese and Grupero music. The dam is used for water sports, and there is a park named Florencio Antillon Garden next to it.

The Christ the King Monument was constructed on the top of Cubilete Mountain in 1923 by architect Nicolás Mariscal Piña and sculptor Fidias Elizondo. The sculpture stands 20 meters (66 ft) tall and shows Christ with his arms extended flanked by two angels who hold a crown of thorns and a royal crown. The sculpture weighs 250 metric tons (280 short tons). From the plaza, one can see the entire Bajio Valley.

== Twin towns – sister cities ==
Guanajuato City has reached twin town and sister city agreements with a substantial number of cities for a relatively small city in a Mexican context (123rd largest city in 2015). The most iconic and visible relationship is that with Ashland. The rest of the sister city relationships are comparatively quite inactive. Sister city agreements include:

- Puebla, Mexico
- San Miguel de Allende, Mexico
- Zacatecas, Mexico
- Ashland, Oregon, United States
- Morgantown, West Virginia, United States
- South Bend, Indiana, United States
- Alcalá de Henares, Spain
- Santa Fe, Spain
- San Fernando, Spain
- Toledo, Spain
- Segovia, Spain
- Seville, Spain
- Alcázar de San Juan, Spain
- Spoleto, Italy
- Avignon, France
- Umeå, Sweden
- Dolores Hidalgo, Mexico
- Oaxaca, Mexico
- Mexico City, Mexico
- Morelia, Mexico
- Campeche City, Mexico
- Querétaro City, Mexico
- Tlacotalpan, Mexico
- Acapulco, Mexico
- Tepatitlán de Morelos, Mexico
- Old Havana, Cuba
- Cuenca, Ecuador
- Arequipa, Peru
- Quebec City, Canada
- Valparaíso, Chile
- Salinas, California, United States

== Notable natives and residents ==
- Alfredo Dugès, Mexican naturalist.
- Emma Godoy, academic and writer.
- Jorge Ibargüengoitia, journalist and writer.
- Jorge Negrete, Mexican singer from the "Golden Age" of Mexican cinema.
- Diego Rivera, Mexican muralist.
- José Alfredo Jiménez, Mexican singer-songwriter
- Enrique Ruelas Espinosa, poet, writer and director of the theater of the University of Guanajuato.
- Agustin Lanuza, Poet, Writer.
- Enrique Romero Courtade, Regent of the Central Department (Jefe del Departamento Central/ formerly Mexico D.F). Diplomat.
- Lucas Alamán, politician

== Bibliography ==
- Jimenez Gonzalez, Victor Manuel, ed. (2009). Guanajuato:Guia para descubrir los encantos del estado (in Spanish). Madrid, Spain: Solaris. ISBN 978-607-400-177-8.
- Leal, Manuel G. (2009). Leyendas de Guanajuato [Legends of Guanajuato] (in Spanish). Guanajuato: Stampart.
- Leal, Manuel, G. (2009). Guanajuato, Mexico (in English and Spanish). Guanajuato: Stampart.
- Lanuza, Agustin (1910) https://worldcat.org/en/title/814512883
