= Guanajuato River =

The Guanajuato's River (Spanish: Rio Guanajuato) is a tributary of the Lerma River in the central near region of Mexico called the Bajio (Lowlands). The river begins in the silver-rich Guanajuato mountains near the state capital of Guanajuato City. The river is fed by the Guanajuato river basinca (in Spanish: cuenca) (a sub-basin to the much larger Lerma–Chapala Basin) and has an area of 3,320 km², which makes up approximately 10.32% of the total area of the state. There are approximately 900,000 people living in the Guanajuato River basin area, in the municipalities of Guanajuato, Irapuato, Romita, San Francisco del Rincon, Manuel Doblado and Pueblo Nuevo.

== History/Culture ==
The river used to run underneath the capital city of Guanajuato. It used to flood the downtown area with alarming frequency until a dam (Presa de la Purisima) was built in the 1960s to contain it. The famous Underground Street, officially known as Calle Miguel Hidalgo, in Guanajuato now follows the original course of the river where it ran in tunnels underneath the city.

There is another dam above the city called the Presa de la Olla (in English: Pot Dam). The dam, which was inaugurated in 1749, was built to create a reservoir to provide the city with a constant supply of water. Every year on the first Monday in July, the dam's floodgates are opened as part of a yearly festival (in Spanish: Apertura de la Presa). Originally the dam was opened to clean the river which runs through the city. It is now a standing Guanajuato tradition.
