= Estadio José Aguilar y Maya =

Stadium in Guanajuato, Mexico

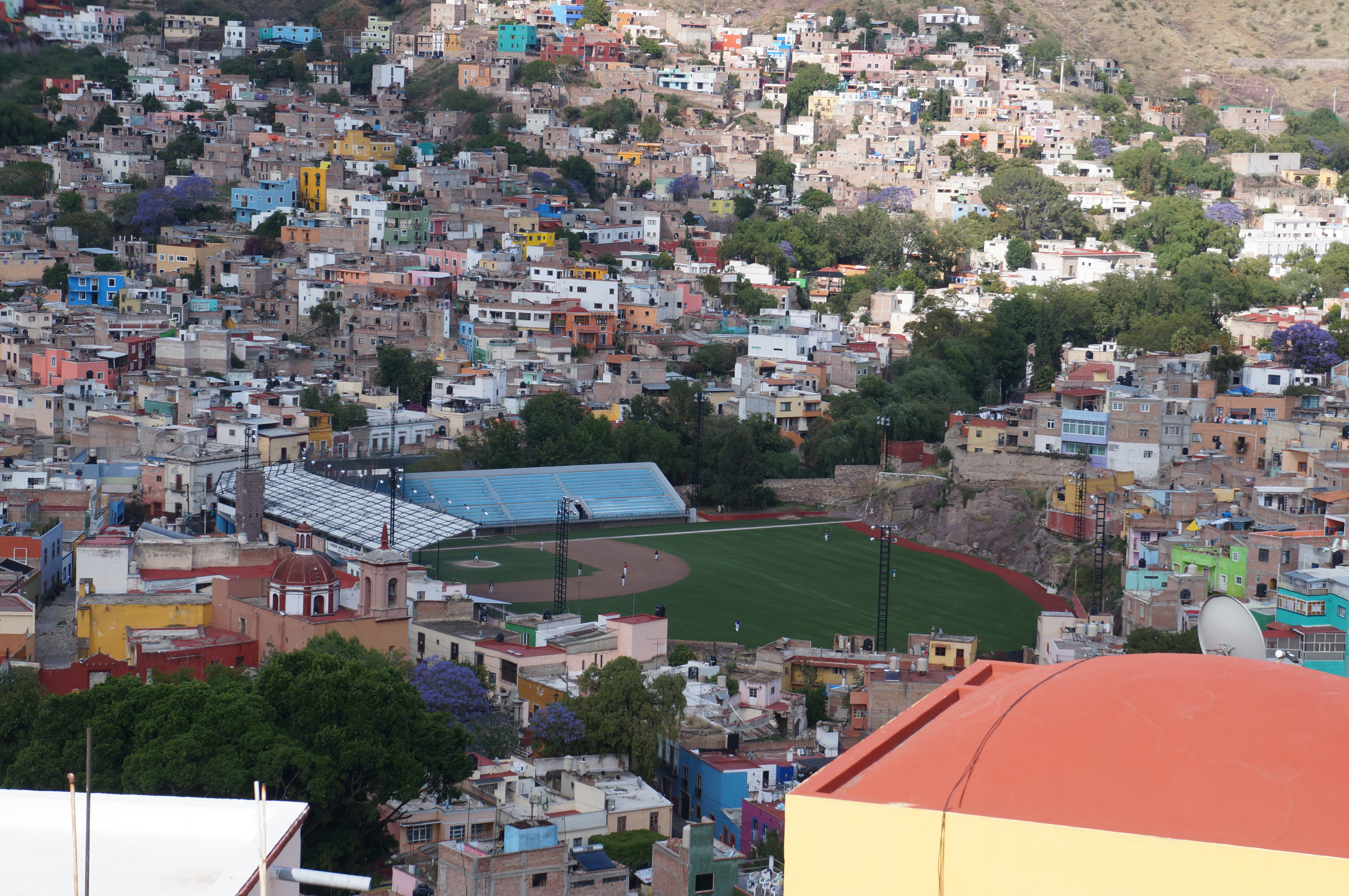
- Aerial View in 2015
- Interactive map of Estadio José Aguilar y Maya
- Full name: Estadio Licenciado Don José Aguilar y Maya
- Former names: San Jerónimo
- Location: Guanajuato, Mexico
- Coordinates: 21°0′38.38″N 101°14′55.00″W
- Owner: State of Guanajuato
- Capacity: 3,000
- Surface: Artificial Grass
- Field size: Left Field – 88 metres (289 ft); Center Field – 101 metres (331 ft); Right Field – 83.6 metres (274 ft)

Construction
- Built: 1950's
- Opened: September 16, 1954
- Renovated: 2012-2013

Tenants
- Tuzos de Guanajato (LCM) (1960–78); Tuzos de Guanajato (LIM) (2015–16)

Estadio José Aguilar y Maya (English: Jose Aguilar y Maya Stadium) is a baseball stadium in Guanajuato, located within the Pastita borough. Inaugurated on 16 September 1954, the stadium has a capacity of 3,000 seats.

== Description ==
The stadium has unique architecture as its outfield is composed of a natural mountain stone wall. On top of the stonewall colorful houses line up the stadium's background showing a typical skyline of the city of Guanajuato.

The ballpark was named for the (1949–55) State Governor José Aguilar y Maya and it is nicknamed San Jerónimo (English: Saint Jerome) for its former name.

== History ==
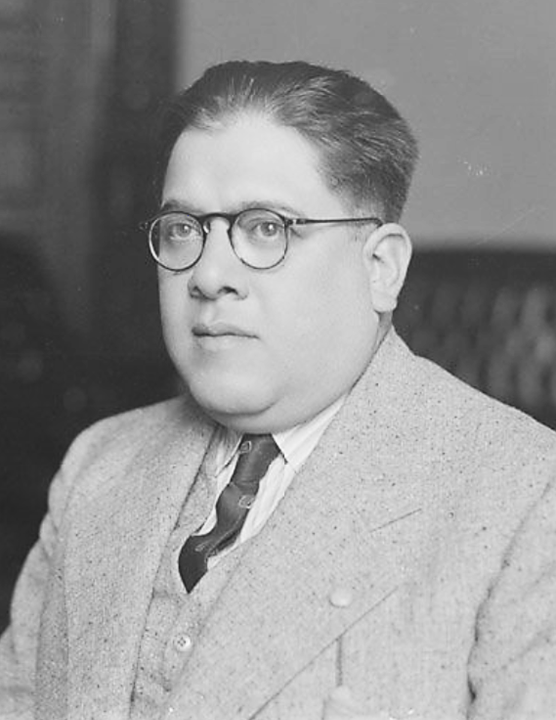
Guanajuato State Governor José Aguilar y Maya

From 1904 until the 1950s, the locals played at a small area they named San Jerónimo Park Grounds. In the early 1950s, the administration of the State Governor José Aguilar y Maya built a new stadium near the City Center of Guanajuato specifically in the Pastita borough.

During the late 1970s, a young teen Fernando Valenzuela made the stadium grounds his home during his stint with the Tuzos de Guanajuato of the Mexican Central League.

In April 2013, the stadium had a re-inauguration event after a series of renovations to the stadium switching it from Natural grass to Artificial Grass as well as other upgrades.

== LMB Preseason Matches ==
José Aguilar y Maya Stadium hosted its first Mexican League Pre-Season game between the Bravos de León and the Rieleros de Aguascalientes on Friday April 5, 2024. The Bravos de Leon won the game 5–4.

Date	Winning Team	Result	Losing Team	Event
April 5, 2024	Bravos de León	5–4	Rieleros de Aguascalientes	2024 LMB PreSeason

== See also ==
- Mexican Baseball League
