= Plaza de San Roque, Guanajuato City =

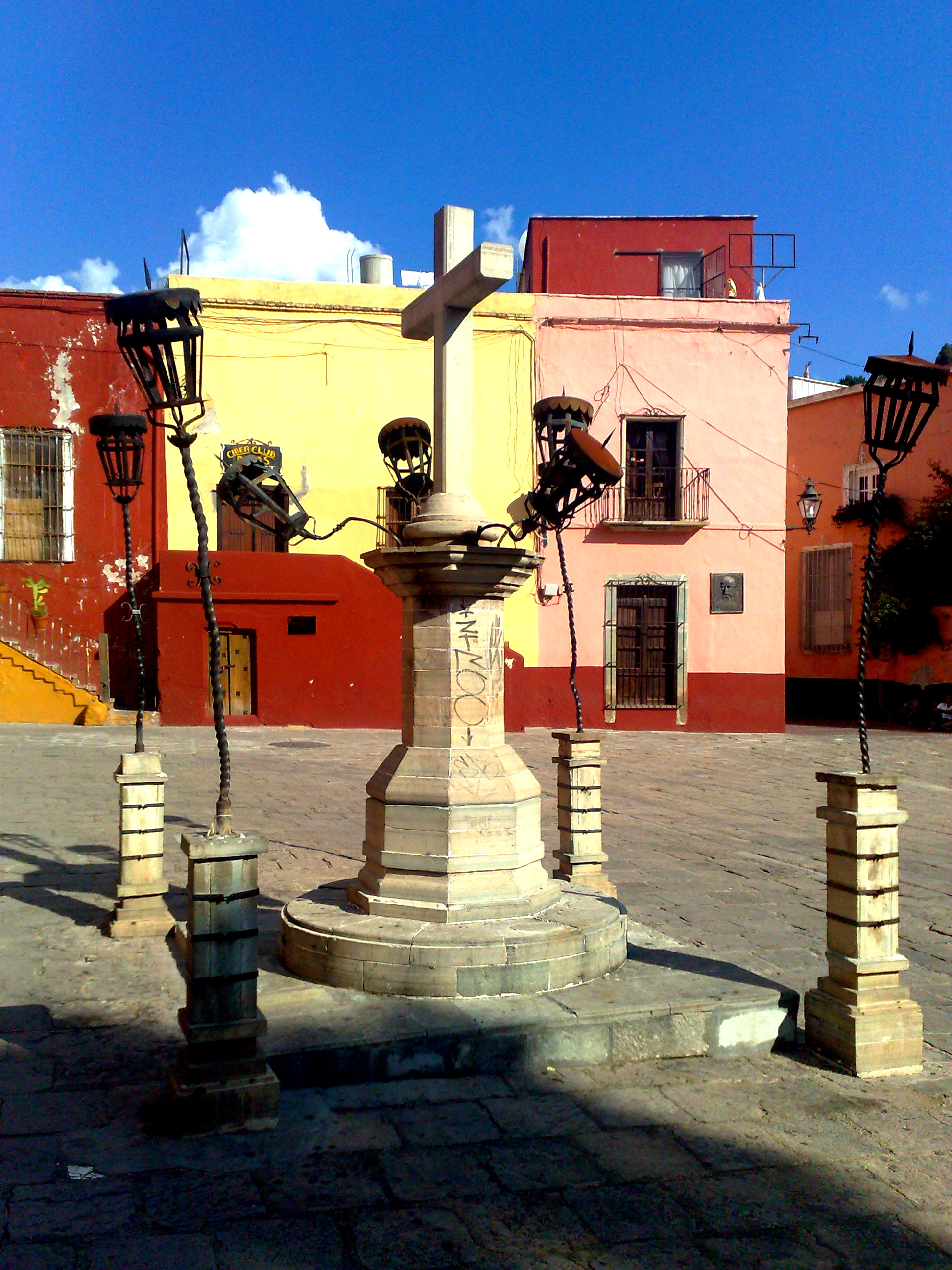
Cross in the San Roque Plaza

The Plaza de San Roque is a small open area in front of the San Roque Temple in the historic center of Guanajuato, Mexico. The temple building dates from 1726 but the plaza itself is notable as the site of the Entremeses Cervantinos, the predecessor of the current Festival Internacional Cervantino. The plaza was chosen by director Enrique Ruelas to host an outdoor play in 1952, which as successful enough to become an annual tradition before it was replaced by the much larger festival in 1972.

== The temple ==
The plaza is associated with the San Roque Temple. The current building dates from 1726, but its origins are a chapel constructed in 1651 by the Cofradía de la Miserícordia (Brotherhood of Mercy). The San Roque Temple is in a state of deterioration, with authorities unable to adequately renovate the structure.

== The plaza ==
The small plaza is in front of the church, in the shape of a fan. In the middle of the space, there is a stone cross constructed in 1952 surrounded by six wrought iron lamps similar to the Cross of Córdoba, Spain. This cross indicates that the plaza was once a cemetery and was an important element of the Entremeses Cervantinos.

The plaza has also contained a statue of Enrique Ruelas to honor his role as the founder of the Entremeses Cervantinos although it has been moved several times because of problems with pigeons. Currently it is next to the San Roque Temple.

== Entremeses Cervantinos ==
In 1953, the plaza began to host an event called the Entremeses Cervantinos, directed by Enrique Ruelas, the origins of the Festival International Cervantino established in 1972. Ruelas come to the city in 1936 to study law but became inspired by the city’s colonial architecture to use it as a backdrop for outdoor theatrical productions, mounting various productions with friends between 1938 and 1940. After a number of years in theater in Mexico City, he was invited back to Guanajuato by the University of Guanajuato to work. Ruelas again promoted open air theater in the style of Miguel de Cervantes, using the San Roque Plaza. He chose the plaza not only because of its physical attributes but also because he and his wife, Alica Barajas, courted there. Ruelas’ productions at the plaza proved popular, becoming an annual tradition, eventually converting in 1972 into the current festival.
