= Timeline of Guanajuato City =

Coordinates: 21.017778°N 101.256667°W

The following is a timeline of the history of the city of Guanajuato, Mexico.

== Prior to 20th century ==
- 1554 - Guanajuato founded.
- 1558 - Mine shaft in operation, per Spaniards.
- 1679 - Town charter granted.
- 1732 - Hospice of the Holy Trinity founded.
- 1741 - Guanajuato attains city status.
- 1760 - Flood.
- 1765 - Compania church built.
- 1785 - Chamber of Commerce built.
- 1788 - Templo de San Cayetano (church) dedicated.
- 1809 - Alhóndiga de Granaditas built.
- 1810 - Town besieged by forces of Miguel Hidalgo y Costilla.
- 1812 - Mint established.
- 1867 - National College of Guanajuato active.
- 1872 - El Pensamiento Público newspaper in publication (approximate date).
- 1895 - Population: 39,404.
- 1898 - Plaza de la Paz built.
- 1900
  - Electricity installed (approximate date).
  - Population: 41,486.

== 20th century ==
- 1903 - Teatro Juarez (theatre) inaugurated.
- 1911 - El Hearaldo Guanajuatense and El Triunfo de la Justicia newspapers begin publication.
- 1960 - Population: 55,107.
- 1972 - Festival Internacional Cervantino active.
- 1990 - Population: 73,100.
- 1998 - Expresión en Corto International Film Festival begins.

== 21st century ==
- 2005 - Festival Medieval de Guanajuato begins.
- 2007 - MM Cinemas open.
- 2009
  - Abejas de Guanajuato basketball team formed.
  - Nicéforo Guerrero Reynoso elected mayor.
- 2010 - Population: metro 171,709.
- 2021 - Location for Forza Horizon 5

== See also ==
- Guanajuato history (city)
- Guanajuato history (state)

== Bibliography ==
=== In English ===
Published in the 19th century

- Charles Knight, ed. (1866). "Guanaxuato". Geography. English Cyclopaedia. Vol. 3. London: Bradbury, Evans, & Co. hdl:2027/nyp.33433000064802.
- Albert S. Evans (1870), "Guanajuato", Our Sister Republic: a Gala Trip through Tropical Mexico in 1869-70, Hartford, Connecticut: Columbian Book Co.
- Alfred Ronald Conkling (1893), "Guanajuato", Appletons' Guide to Mexico, New York: D. Appleton & Company
- Henry Moore (1894), "Commercial Directory: Guanajuato", Railway Guide of the Republic of Mexico, Springfield, Ohio: Huben & Moore, OCLC 22498265
- "Guanajuato", Vamos á México, Chicago: Southern Pacific Company, 1896
- Vera Granville (1899), "The Ancient City of Guanajuato", Overland Monthly, 33, San Francisco, hdl:2027/inu.30000080737624

Published in the 20th century

- Robert McF. Doble (1904), "The Guanajuato Mexico Power Transmission", Electrical World and Engineer, 44, New York
- Percy F. Martin (1906), Mexico's Treasure House (Guanajuato): an Illustrated and Descriptive Account of the Mines, New York: Cheltenham Press, OCLC 1159847, OL 6976885M
- Reau Campbell (1909), "Guanajuato", Campbell's New Revised Complete Guide and Descriptive Book of Mexico, Chicago: Rogers & Smith Co., OCLC 1667015
- "Guanajuato (city)" . Encyclopædia Britannica. Vol. 12 (11th ed.). 1910. p. 650.
- William English Carson (1914), "Silver City", Mexico, New York: Macmillan
- Ernst B. Filsinger (1922), "Mexico: Guanajuato", Commercial Travelers' Guide to Latin America, Washington, DC: Government Printing Office
- Margaret E. Rankine (1992). "Mexican Mining Industry in the Nineteenth Century with Special Reference to Guanajuato". Bulletin of Latin American Research. 11 (1): 29–48. doi:10.2307/3338598. JSTOR 3338598.
- Baedeker's Mexico, 1994, p. 236+ (fulltext via OpenLibrary)
- Laurie L. Walsh (1995). "Guanajuato". In Trudy Ring and Robert M. Salkin (ed.). Americas. International Dictionary of Historic Places. Routledge. pp. 272–274. ISBN 978-1-134-25930-4.
- "North Central Highlands: Guanajuato", Mexico, Lonely Planet, 1998 (fulltext via OpenLibrary)
- John Fisher (1999), "The Bajio: Guajajuato", Mexico, Rough Guides (4th ed.), London, p. 235+, OL 24935876M
- "Central Mexico: Guanajuato", Mexico, Let's Go, 1999 (fulltext via OpenLibrary)

Published in the 21st century

- Georgina H. Endfield; et al. (2004). "Conflict and Cooperation: Water, Floods, and Social Response in Colonial Guanajuato, Mexico". Environmental History. 9 (2): 221–247. doi:10.2307/3986085. JSTOR 3986085. S2CID 144963832.
- David Marley (2005), "Guanajuato", Historic Cities of the Americas, vol. 1, Santa Barbara, California: ABC-CLIO, p. 237+, ISBN 1576070271

=== In Spanish ===
- Antonio García Cubas [in Spanish] (1896). "Guanajuato". Diccionario Geográfico, Histórico y Biográfico de los Estados Unidos Mexicanos (in Spanish). Vol. 3. México: Antigua Imprenta de las Escalerillas. hdl:2027/coo.31924056282340.
- Féliz Ramos y Duarte (1899), "Ciudad de Guanajuato", Diccionario de curiosidades historicas, geograficas, hierograficas, cronologicas, etc., de la Republica Mejicana [Dictionary of historical curiosities, geographical, hierograficas, timelines, etc.., Of the Mexican Republic], Méjico: E. Dublán, OCLC 11673485
