= Vivarium (disambiguation) =

A vivarium is an enclosed area for keeping and raising lifeforms.

Vivarium may also refer to:

- Vivarium (Milwaukee). 2024 concert venue in Milwaukee Wisconsin
- Vivarium (monastery), founded by Cassiodorus
- Vivarium (Rome), the location in ancient Rome where wild animals were kept
- Vivarium Inc., a Japanese video game company
- Vivarium (EP), a 2009 release by the rock band Twin Atlantic
- Vivarium Studio, a theatrical company based in Paris
- Vivarium (film), a 2019 sci-fi film directed by Lorcan Finnegan
- Vivarium (song), a song by Ado
