= DeMUG Baroque Ensemble =

The DeMUG Baroque Ensemble (Ensamble Barroco del DeMUG) consists of twenty musicians including singers, instrumentalists and composers from the Department of Music at the University of Guanajuato in central México. The group is dedicated to the study and performance of Baroque music including the playing of period instruments and the reading of music sheets from that time. The group was founded in 2008 as a result of an interdisciplinary workshop on the performance of Baroque music given by Dr. Fabrizio Ammetto at the University.

The group is directed by Italian musician and musicologist Fabrizio Ammetto. Dr. Ammetto is Full Professor of Violin, Chamber Music, Baroque Music, Musical Analysis and Musical Philology at the Music Department of the University of Guanajuato, Gto., México. He is a member of the ‘Academia Mexicana de Ciencias’ (AMC), and of the ‘Sistema Nacional de Investigadores’ (SNI) of México. He has degrees in Violin (Conservatorio ‘F. Morlacchi’ in Perugia, Italy), Viola (Conservatorio ‘G. Rossini’ in Pesaro, Italy) and Electronic Music (Conservatorio ‘F. Morlacchi’ in Perugia, Italy), and received a master in Violin from the Conservatorio ‘A. Casella’ in L'Aquila, Italy, and a Ph.D. in Musicology from the University of Bologna, Italy. His doctoral dissertation was about the Concerts for two violins by Vivaldi, published by Leo S. Olschki (Firenze, 2013, «Quaderni vivaldiani», XVIII). He has given over seven hundred concerts in Europe and America (as violinist, violist, and conductor), and is the author of numerous critical editions (Bongiovanni, Curci, Ricordi and Ut Orpheus) and recordings (Ars Publica, Bongiovanni, Dynamic, Edipan, Mondo Musica - EMI, Nuova Era, Quadrivium, RCA, Tactus) of eighteenth- and nineteenth-century instrumental music by Albinoni, Beethoven, Boccherini, Bruni, Mozart, Paganini, Telemann, Tessarini, Valeri, van Wassenaer, and Vivaldi. He has published articles (in English, Italian, and Spanish) in “Ad Parnassum”, “ArteConCiencia”, “Esercizi. Musica e spettacolo”, “Hortus Musicus”, “Studi vivaldiani”, and “The Consort”. He is the founder and director of ‘L’Orfeo Ensemble’ of Spoleto. He has directed the Civico Istituto Musicale ‘A. Onofri’ of Spoleto, Italy, and taught Baroque Violin at the Conservatorio ‘G. Verdi’ in Turin, Italy. Fabrizio Ammetto is a member of the international Editorial Committee of the Istituto Italiano Antonio Vivaldi (Fondazione Giorgio Cini), Venice, Italy.

The members of the group are Miguel Ángel Lozano Bonilla (violin), Tlathui Benavides Trejo (violin), Raúl Delgado Delgado (violin), Elizabeth Martínez Ramírez (violin), José de Jesús Yebra Velázquez (violin), María del Rosario Aguinaco Flores (violin), Cindy Zuleyka Sánchez Arias (violin), Ernesto Vargas Álvarez (violin), Héctor Eduardo García Guerra (violin), Acatzin Omar Pérez López (violin), Marco Antonio Pruneda Tavárez (viola), David Gutiérrez Escalante (viola), Lizbeth Alejandra Pérez Bernal (cello), Sayra Ivonne Jacinto Aranda (cello), Tania Becerra Sosa (bassoon), Paulo Tovar Gómez (double bass), Alejandra Béjar Bartolo (harpsichord and organ), María Elena Alcaraz Lozano (harpsichord).

They have performed vocal and instrumental works by Tomaso Albinoni, Johann Sebastian Bach, Giuseppe Bergonzi, Arcangelo Corelli, Evaristo Felice Dall'Abaco, Giacomo Facco, Giovanni Lorenzo Gregori, Georg Friedrich Händel, Giuseppe Maria Jacchini, Benedetto Marcello, Artemio Motta, Giulio Taglietti, Georg Philipp Telemann, Giuseppe Torelli, Unico Willem van Wassenaer and Antonio Vivaldi. The group regularly performs at various festivals in central Mexico (i.e., León, Gto., and Cuernavaca, Mor.), including the ‘Festival de Verano’, the 'Festival Internacional de Órgano' (FIOG) and Festival Internacional Cervantino (October 29, 2011, October 5, 2012, October 16, 2013, and October 21, 2014), all in Guanajuato.
