= Casani =

Casani is a surname. Notable people with the surname include:

- John R. Casani (1932–2025), American engineer
- Pietro Casani (1572–1647), Italian priest
- Santos Casani (1893–1983), born Joseph Zisling, Russian-British dancer
