= Teatro Principal (Guanajuato) =

18th-century theater in Mexico

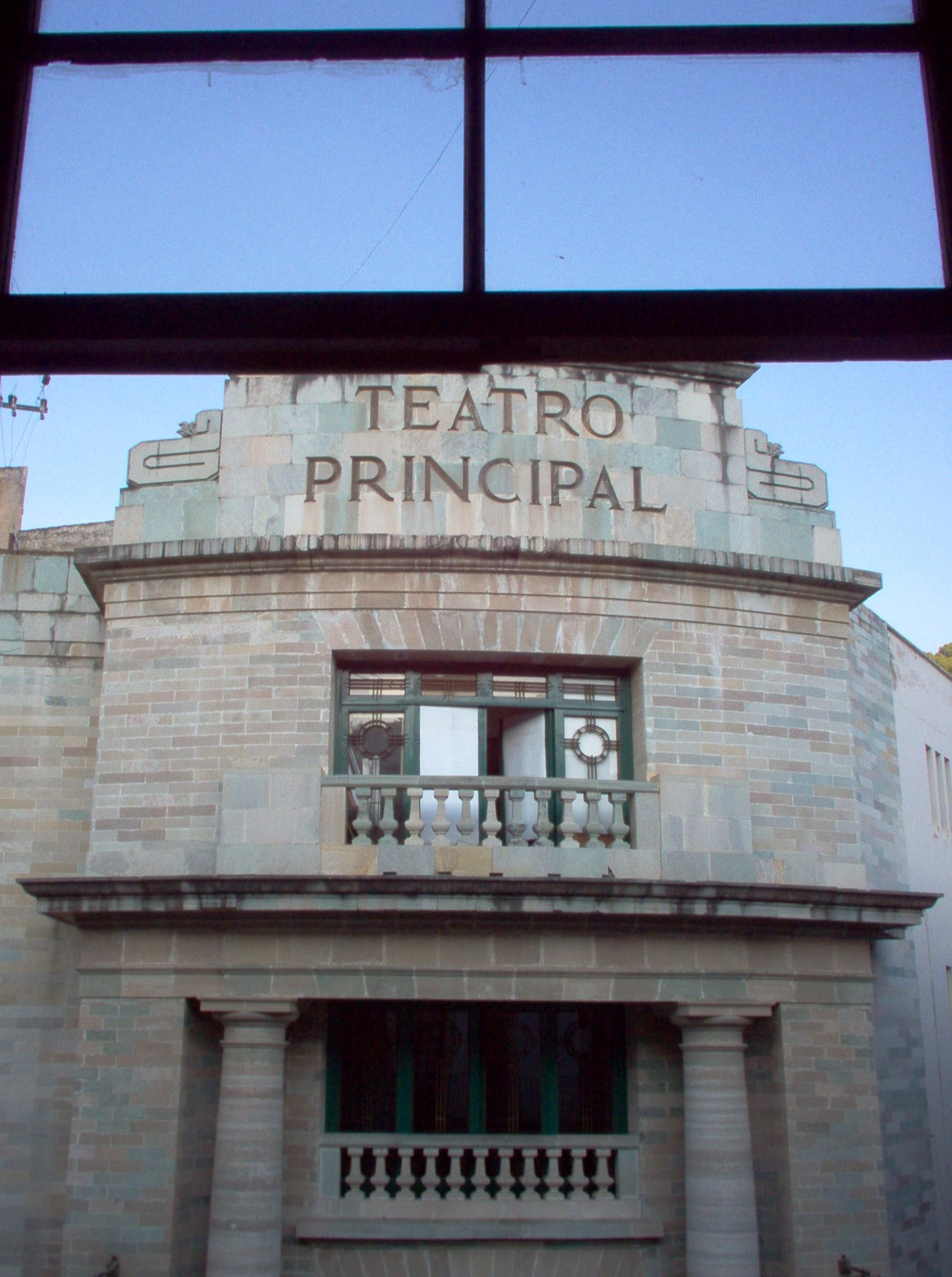
View of the upper facade

Teatro Principal (Main Theater) in the city of Guanajuato, Mexico is an 18th-century theatre, the first to be opened in Guanajuato, located on Mendizábal Street on the corner of Avenida Juarez.

The building was built in Neoclassical style and inaugurated in 1788 with the name “Corral de Comedias.” At this time the city was a booming mining town and it was built to provide entertainment, allowing entrance to all social classes.

By the early 19th century, it was considered as one of the best theaters in Mexico and was remodeled several times including in 1826 and 1831. However it is later years it fell into disrepair and was closed.

After the Mexican Revolution, it was turned into a cinema, but after a 1921 fire, it was closed again and remained so until the 1950s, when it was completely rebuilt for its current purpose. The theater was reinaugurated on September 16, 1955, now with art deco architectural elements. Today it is managed by the University of Guanajuato, which uses it to host various types of cultural events, especially plays and contemporary dance. It is also a main venue of the Festival Internacional Cervantino.
