= La Valenciana Church (San Cayetano) =

Coordinates: 21°2′29.69″N 101°15′27.11″W

- Iglesia de la Valenciana (Spanish)
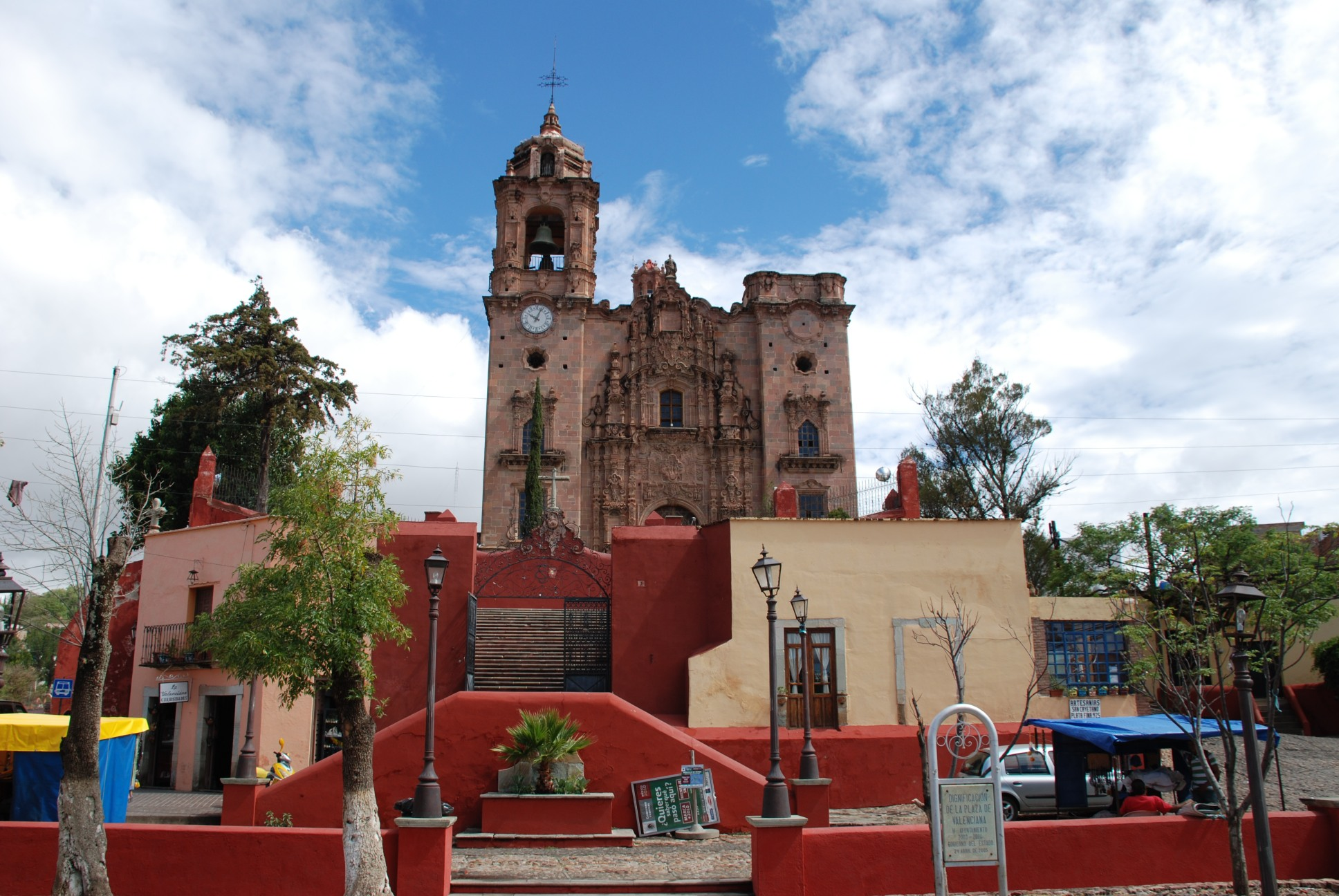
- La Valenciana Church
- La Valenciana Church
- Denomination: Catholic
- Tradition: Roman Rite

History
- Dedication: Saint Cajetan

Architecture
- Style: Churrigueresque
- Groundbreaking: 1775
- Completed: 1788

Administration
- Archdiocese: León

The Church of San Cayetano is an 18th-century Mexican Churrigueresque church built at the opening of the La Valenciana mine, the site of the largest vein of silver found in Mexico. It was built by Antonio de Ordóñez y Alcocer, the owner of the mine, to give thanks to his patron saint, Saint Cajetan, for the riches the mine provided. The church is noted for use of gold leaf, especially the main altarpieces which are completely covered in the metal. The church is also a site of the Festival Internacional Cervantino.

== Description ==
Located on one of the hillsides overlooking the city of Guanajuato, on the highway that leads to Dolores Hidalgo, the church is an important example of Mexican Churrigueresque style.

The church is built of pink volcanic stone (cantera), fronted by an irregular shaped atrium surrounded by a wall topped by merlons. Around the main and side entrances, this stone is intricately carved to form altarpieces. The two doors of the main entrance are typical for the time, carved from fine wood.

The interior layout is that of a Latin cross, with a notable octagonal cupola at the intersection. The chancel holds three very large Churrigueresque altarpieces, all covered in gold leaf, with the one in the center dedicated to Saint Cajetan.

The church still has some of the original furnishings such as the pulpit and the organ. The baptismal font dates from the 19th century and is of a different style from the rest of the building. There are also several paintings by Luis Monroy done at the end of the 19th century.

The annex of the church houses the archives of the University of Guanajuato.

== History ==
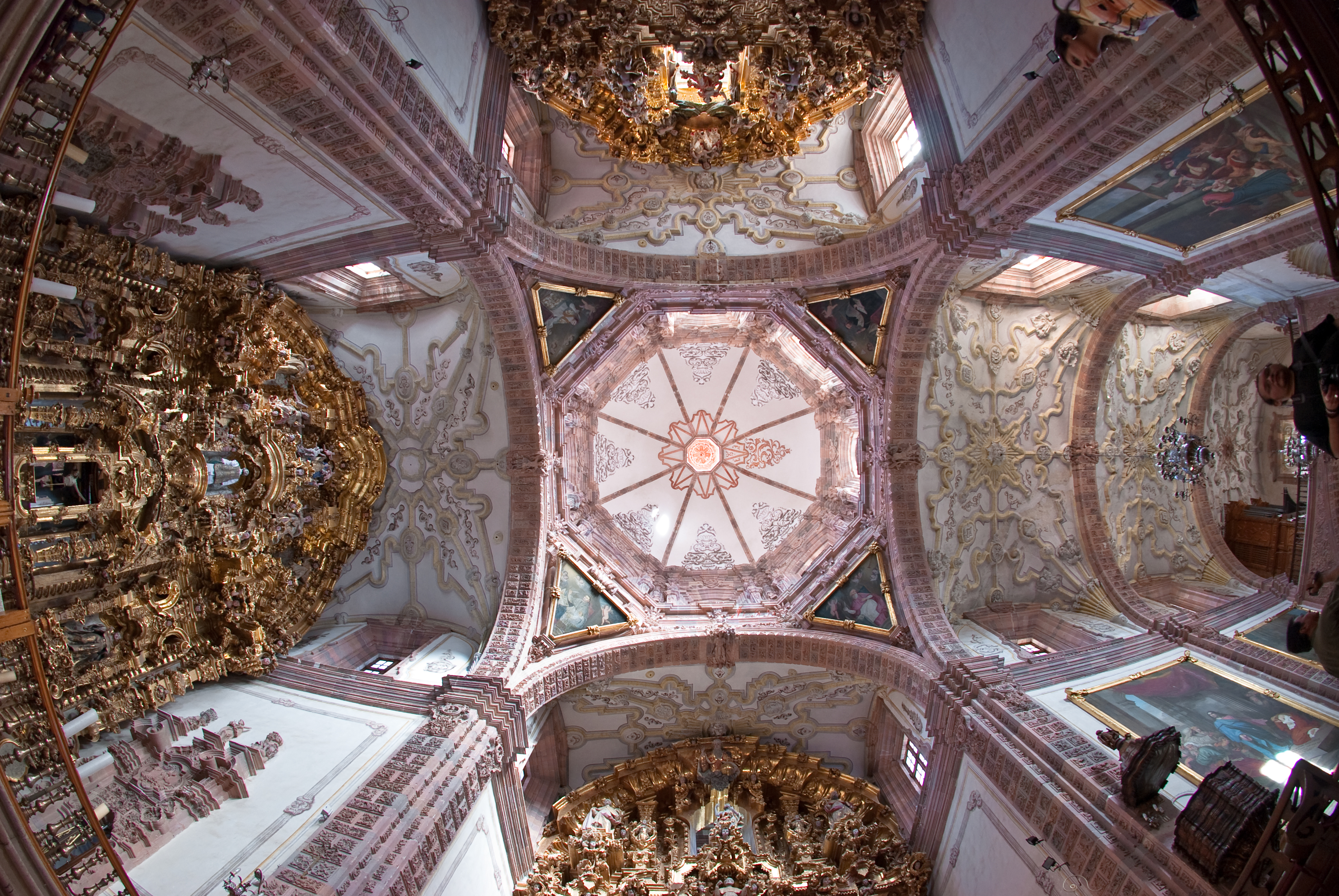
Interior.

La Valenciana is one of several churches that were built at the openings of mines in Guanajuato, such as the Cata and Rayas churches. The building of this church was sponsored by Antonio de Ordóñez y Alcocer, to give thanks to his patron Saint Cajetan (San Cayetano in Spanish). The La Valenciana mine was first worked in 1558, but abandoned in 1559 as it was thought to be exhausted.

The earnings from the mine financed the building of the church. Ordóñez dug various mines and went broke many times until he reopened Valenciana mine in 1760. Digging 80 meters, he found the largest silver vein ever in Mexico, according to Baron von Humboldt who studied operations here in the late 18th century. The find earned him the noble title of Count of La Valenciana and Viscount of the Mine granted by Carlos III in 1780.

Construction of the church was begun in 1775 under architect Andrés de la Riva and master carpenter Manuel Antonio de Cárdenas. Both died before the project was completed, with their roles taken over by Jorge Archundia and José Simón Cayetano Tovar respectively. The project was completed in 1788, with the dedication to Saint Cajetan. The family of the count also intended to found a monastery for the Theatine order, constructing a house for the monks, but it was never occupied.

Since its construction the church has lost a bell tower and several saints from its facade. In 2014, concerns have been raised about the church’s condition, especially the remaining bell tower, mostly from water damage and the accumulation of dust on the altarpieces.

The church is one of the sites of the Festival Internacional Cervantino.

== See also ==
- List of buildings in Guanajuato City
