= Festival Internacional Cervantino =

Annual festival in Guanajuato, Mexico

Coordinates: 21°1′3.74″N 101°15′23.99″W

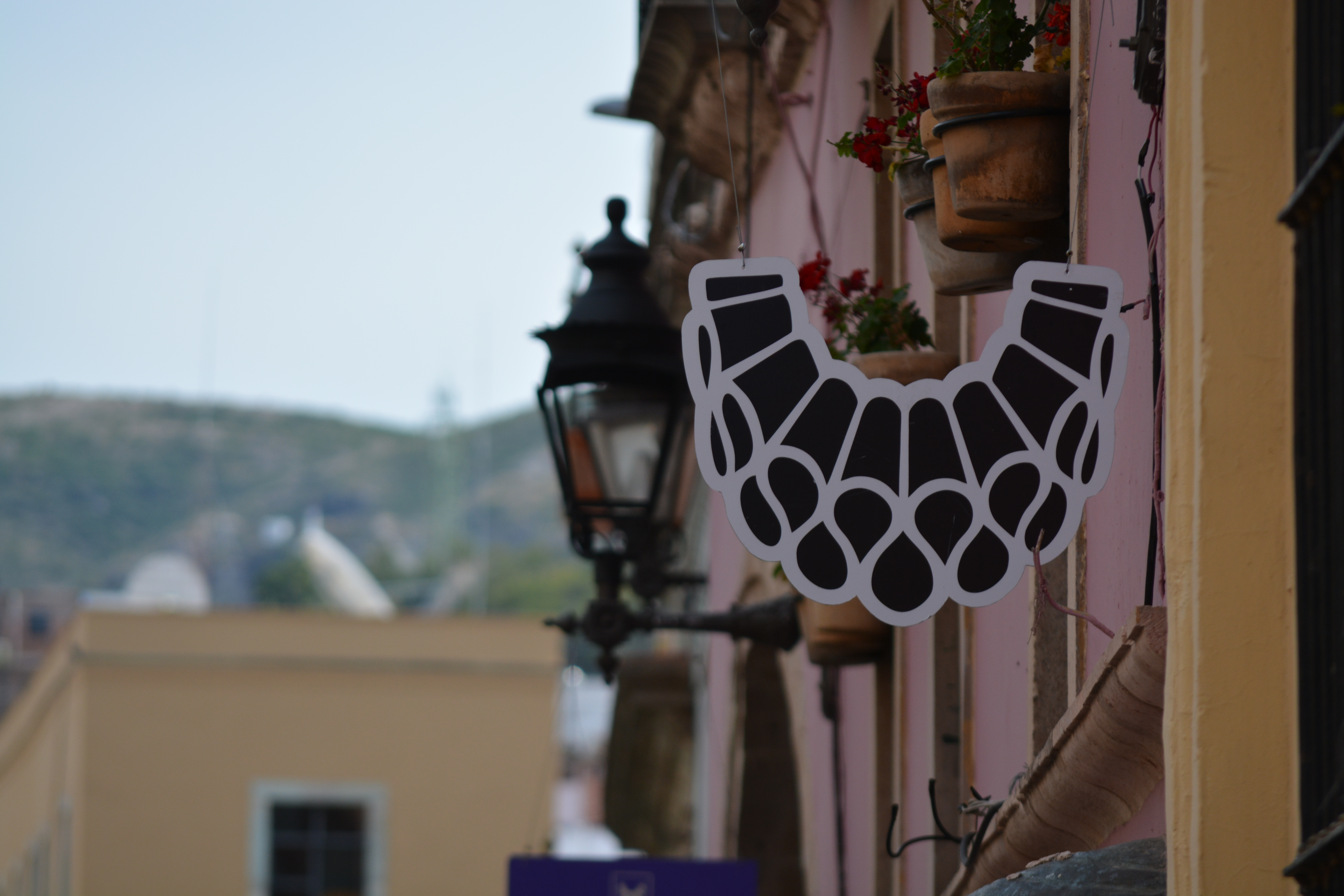
Emblem of the festival in the streets of Guanajuato

The Festival Internacional Cervantino (FIC), popularly known as El Cervantino, is a festival which takes place each fall in the city of Guanajuato, located in central Mexico. The festival originates from the mid 20th century, when short plays by Miguel de Cervantes called entremeses (singular entremés) were performed in the city's plazas.

In 1972, the festival was expanded with federal support to include more events to add a more international flavor. Since then, FIC has grown to become the most important international artistic and cultural event in Mexico and Latin America, and one of four major events of its type in the world. It is a member of the European Festivals Association and the Asian Association of Theater Festivals In addition to government support, there are also private sponsors such as Telmex, Televisa and Microsoft.

== History ==
=== Origins through the 1970s ===
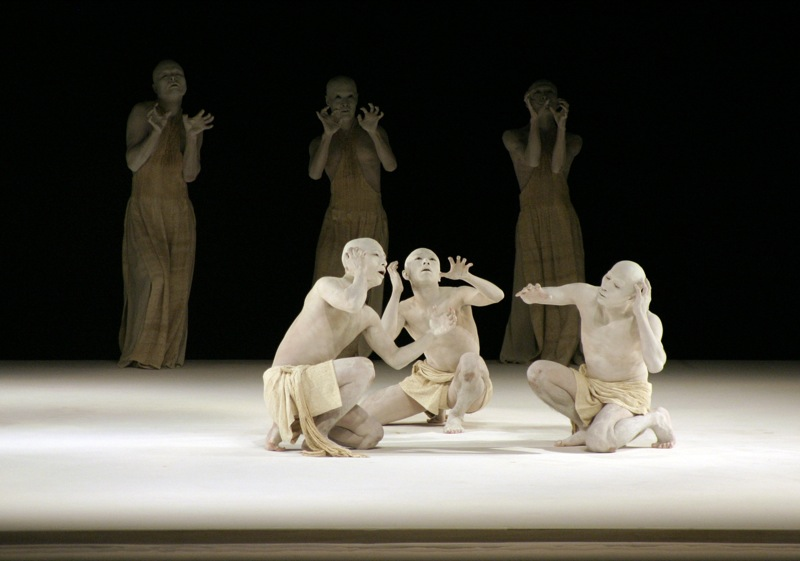
Sankai Juku performing at the 2006 Festival

The city of Guanajuato, where the Festival takes place, has historically had a large cultural scene in relation to its size. The richness of the mines in colonial times started a tradition of theaters and other cultural venues to satisfy the desires of the middle and upper classes. The city has a tradition of hosting musical, theatrical and dance events not only in its numerous theaters but also in its many small plazas with benches.

In 1953, Enrique Ruelas of the University of Guanajuato began to put on an annual event called the Entremeses de Miguel de Cervantes Saaevedra, short plays written by the author of Don Quixote. These plays are still part of the annual Festival. In 1972, he founded the Coloquio Cervantino from June to September to expand the annual Entremeses event. Ruelas's efforts came to the attention of the federal government through actress Dolores del Río.

While in the city of Guanajuato, she came across the Entremeses being performed at the Plaza San Roque and was fascinated. Around the same time, former president Luis Echeverría had attended cultural festivals in Europe and was interested in doing something similar in Mexico. Through Echeverría's cousin, Del Río relayed what she had seen in Guanajuato. The federal government then established the foundation for an international cultural festival, originally proposing it for Acapulco. However, the tradition of the Entremeses was the main reason why Guanajuato was eventually chosen, meshing the two ideas to produce the modern event for the first time in 1972 with performances by artists from fourteen countries including Mexico. For this reason, this year is considered the foundation of the event.

The Festival in its current form was a governmental effort, with the 1972 edition attracting interest solely because of the influence of the politicians promoting it. The Cervantino had its greatest growth from 1976 to 1982, during the presidency of José López Portillo because of the efforts of his wife, Carmen Romano, who promoted it abroad. It quickly gained the attention of noted artists, with Berlin Philharmonic director Herbert von Karajan offering to appear at no cost. Initially the city of Guanajuato had difficulties in hosting the event due to the lack of infrastructure.

Elizabeth II and the Prince Philip, Duke of Edinburgh attended the event in 1975. By decree, an organizing committee was set up in 1976 under the Secretaría de Educación Pública, the state and city of Guanajuato and the University of Guanajuato to invite artists from Mexico and abroad. Some of the first invited by this committee were Mario Moreno Cantinflas and Dolores del Río. This committee is still in charge today, working with the Consejo Nacional para la Cultura y las Artes, el Instituto Nacional de Bellas Artes and the Instituto de Cultura de Guanajuato. In 1978, Juan Carlos and Sofía of Spain attended as guests of honor.

Initially, the city of Guanajuato was only the host, with local artistic groups not participating in the event. However, efforts were soon made to lobby for their inclusion, especially by the Universidad de Guanajuato, and now artists from this university and other parts of the city and state regularly appear.

=== 1980s to the present ===
Since 1982, the festival has diminished somewhat in size, mostly because of reduced funding. Another issue that arose was that the festival had become very popular with backpackers, who slept in the streets and caused problems for local residents. However, it remained a very important event, attracting notable acts and up to 140 journalists to cover it. In the 1980s, these included Lazar Berman, Mercedes Sosa, the New York Philharmonic, Joan Baez, Gilbert Bécaud, Mario Lavista, Guillermo Velázquez, Los Leones de la Sierra de Xichú, the National Ballet of Canada, Nikolais Dance Theater, the Bolshoi Ballet, Sankai Juku, Theater Scena STU (Poland) and the Marionette Theatre of Hungary.

In 1989, the city became a World Heritage Site which allowed most of the city's colonial and late 19th-century architecture, including its theatres, to be restored.

During the 1990s, the festival featured acts such as the Guitar Trio of Amsterdam, Voices of Change, the Vienna Quintet, Guadalupe Pineda, Krzysztof Jakowicz, Krystyna Borucinska, Kronos Quartet, Madredeus, the Open Theater of Belgrade, the Lindsay Kemp Company and the Royal Shakespeare Company.

In the 2000s, the custom of having Mexican states and foreign countries and regions as "special guests" began. In 2001, the invited region was Oceania along with Veracruz. Acts featured during those years included Hélène Grimaud, Eugenio Toussaint, Juan Fornell and Los Van Van, the Vienna Symphony Virtuosi, Enrique Bunbury, Los Tigres del Norte, Panteón Rococó, Meno Fortas and Les 7 doigts de la main.

The city was declared the Cervantino Capital of America in 2005, which prompted the federal government to issue a commemorative silver coin.

However, problems with the lack of funds and organizational issues brought the event to a crisis by 2006. There were structural and financial changes made during the rest of that decade, and by 2010, the Festival was able to recuperate much of its former status, attracting major artists from around the world. However, problems with large crowds of mostly young people, drinking in public remains a problem, especially for the local populace.

The 38th edition of the Festival in 2010 was dedicated to Mexico's Bicentennial of Independence and Centennial of the Revolution. Three states, Chihuahua, Michoacán and Querétaro, along with three countries, Argentina, Colombia and Chile, were the special guests as they celebrated their bicentennials in the same year. The 2010 version had 3,161 artists from 31 countries, with special emphasis on traditional Mexican music and dance.

The 2011 version brought together 2,800 artists from 29 countries, in genres such as classical and folk music to techno, open-air theatre, expositions, recent plays and other works from the 20th century by well-known writers. It is dedicated to the environment, with a theme of "The Gifts of Nature" and special guests Denmark, Finland, Sweden, Norway and Nayarit. Artists include The Oslo Camerata, Geir Henning Braaten, Knut Reiersrud, Mari Boine, a dramatization of Il Postino by Pablo Neruda, the Saint Petersburg Philharmonic Orchestra focusing on 19th century Russian music, especially Tchaikovsky, the DeMUG Baroque Ensemble, and an exhibition of Oaxacan painter Francisco Toledo in the Museo del Pueblo. The 2011 event cost 122 million pesos to set up, with most of the money coming from CONACULTA and the rest from the state of Guanajuato, the University of Guanajuato and the city of Guanajuato.

The 2014 performance was opened by taiko drumming group Tokyo Dagekidan, a performance attended by Japan's Prince Fumihito Akishino and his wife Kiko.

The 2020 festival was presented online from October 14 to 18 due to the COVID-19 pandemic in Mexico.

== Sites ==
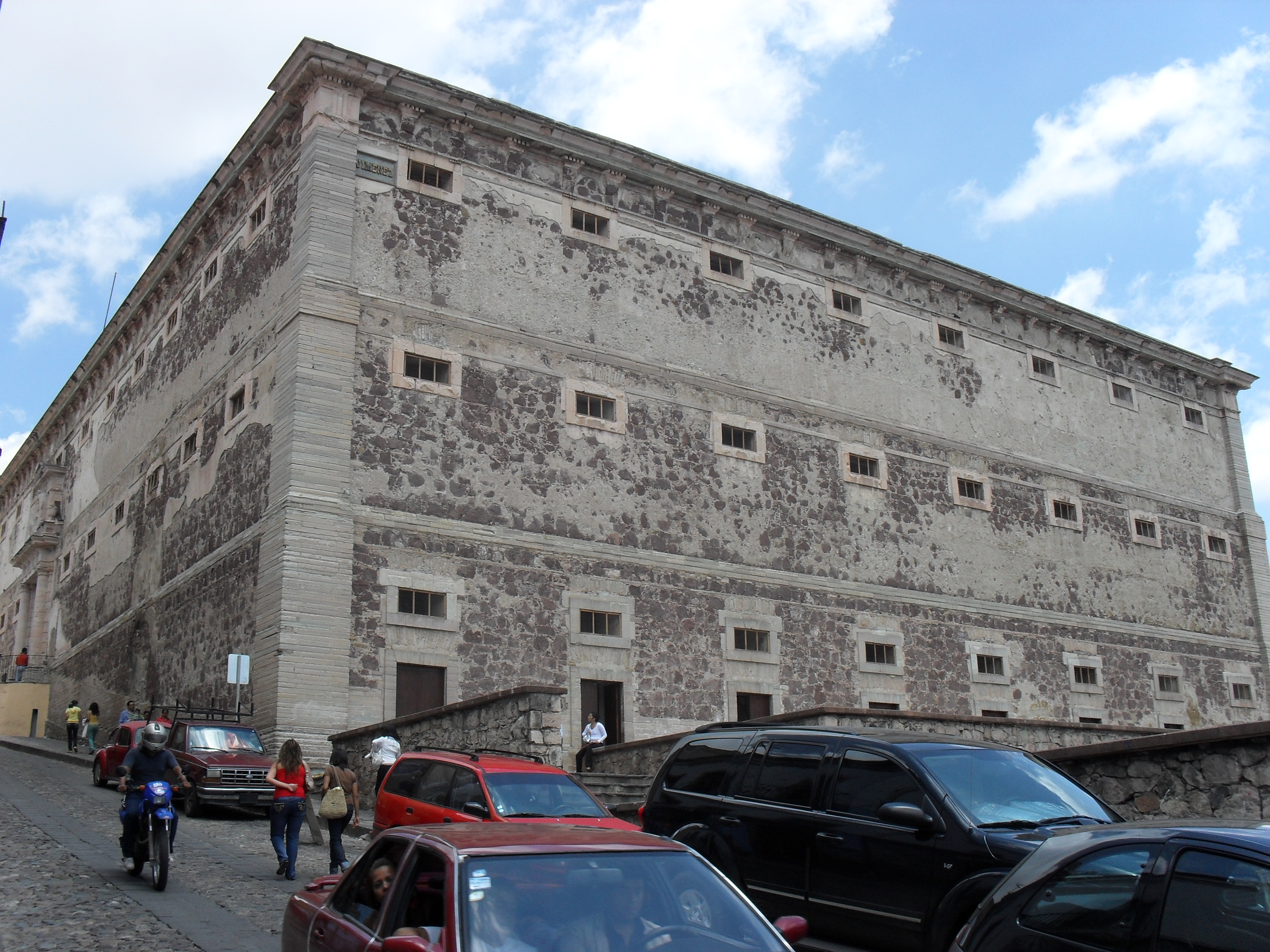
View of the Alhondiga de Granaditas

The events happen in the forty nine theatres, plazas and other venues in the city, with satellite events in other plazas in the state and other cities in the country. The Festival in the city of Guanajuato takes advantage of these numerous venues, indoor and outdoor which include the Teatro Juárez, the Teatro Principal, the Teatro Cervantes, the Patio of the Faculty of Industrial Relations, the State Auditorium, the Plaza San Roque, the Esplanade of the Alhondiga, the Teatro de Minas, the Valenciana Church and the Ex-Hacienda of San Gabriel de Barrera. In addition, seven museum spaces are used for exhibitions such as those of photography.

The event represents a tourist and economic windfall for the city, which brought in 423 million pesos in 2010, a 57% increase over 2009 with hotel occupancy alone up 39%. The total number of visitors in 2010 is estimated at 179,000, with 463,000 tickets to events sold. In addition to the events in Guanajuato proper, there were another 125,000 attendees to related activities in 37 cities and seventeen states in Mexico.

== Types of events ==
Being named after Spanish writer Miguel de Cervantes, the Festival has a special emphasis on artistic creations in the Spanish language, with the original tradition of performing this writer's "entremeses" plays upheld by the University Theater of Guanajuato. The international aspect is to create a space for discovery and exchange. The Ballet Folklorico de Mexico under Amalia Hernández has performed every year since the beginning.

Acts have been booked from all parts of the world of a wide variety from classical music, Mexican folk dance, Chinese acrobats and more. The event attracts artists from all over the world each year in order to present typical aspects of culture from each country. Acts include those from genres such as opera, music, dance, theatre, street spectaculars, visual arts, film and literature along with various academic events. The Festival has an agreement with the MUTEK Festival of Montreal with the aim of presenting newer acts to the audiences in Mexico especially in the field of electronic music.

== Other aspects ==
In 2010, the Presea FIC was instituted to recognize the work of Mexican and foreign artists for their contributions to culture. The prize is symbolized by a statue designed by Vicente Rojo, which is awarded during the opening ceremonies. The first was awarded to Luis Herrera de la Fuente.

To promote a link between culture and technology, the Festival and Microsoft México sponsor a Technology Pavilion at the Mesón de San Antonio. It is planned to contain an Internet café with large lounge chairs and wireless services for those with mobile devices. Microsoft sponsors a set of academic lectures about what's new in technology and art, games and everyday life.

Much of the festival is set up to attract young people from children to university age. The Cervantino Program for Youth sponsors programs for this age group as well as other activities. It has an annual Artistic Creativity Contest for Youth put on in collaboration with the Edinburgh International Festival and The Anglo Mexican Foundation. Two activities in 2010 were a contest of photos taken with cell phones and another contest of short electronic music pieces, both of which were launched over the Internet. Winners received trips to the Edinburgh International Festival, the first and largest international cultural event of its type in the world. A number of performers and academic activities are scheduled with young audiences in mind. These include rock and electronic music concerts with dance and theater events. In 2011, these included German electronic music groups Moonbootica and Schlachthofbronx sponsored by the Goethe Institute and rock musicians Sierra León, Finde, El Otro Yo and Rubick . Theatre for youth include Vivarium Studio performing L éffet de Serge, Mauricio García Lozano and Teatro Farfullero presenting La pequeña habitación al final de la escalera and Circo Aereo and Les Objets Volants, a Finnish/French group with acrobats, comedians and other circus performers. Other events for youth include DJ Frivolous and DJ Kid Koala from Canada and German artist Brandt Brauer Frick who mixes electronic and acoustic sounds. University students can get up to a 73% discount on tickets for selected acts. There is an event to bring together children and Mexican poets and a performance of A magic flute for children by the French ensemble Théâtre des Bouffes du Nord.

In 2011, the Festival scheduled its first Art Book Fair, focusing on books about the visual and theatrical arts.

Based on the program sponsored by the Lucerne Festival, the Cervantino Academy's purpose is to train professional level instrumentalists in classical and contemporary music. The program sponsors individual students, classes, workshops, practice sessions and concerts, including at the Festival Cervantino, both by small ensembles as well as in an orchestra. Participants are under thirty and are selected by audition. The program has invited maestros from both Mexico and abroad, including Irvine Arditti, Steve Schick, Norio Sato and Salvatore Sciarrino. The program attracts students from various countries in Latin America, including Guatemala, Brazil, Cuba, and Bolivia as well as Mexico.

== Festival events for audiences outside of Guanajuato ==
Prior Festival events and shows related to artists scheduled to perform in upcoming festivals are shown through the Festival's television, radio and website. A channel called TV FIC or Canal Cervantino was created on channel 157 of Cablevision to broadcast archived footage of past festivals and performances by those scheduled to perform the upcoming year. Microsoft sponsors the Festival's web page as well as an online radio station called Radio FIC which offers online archives of music, video and photographic works, as well as a various types of informative material.

Most of the events related to the Festival occur in Guanajuato, but some events such as dance, plays and concerts are presented live or are transmitted to other areas of the country. These include national and international acts. The Más Allá de Guanajuato (Beyond Guanajuato) program to bring Cervantino cultural events to other parts of the country, free to the public. As of 2014, the program has sponsored events in over 100 venues in 26 states and the Federal District. These include schools, cultural center, libraries and correctional institutions. Much of this activity is made possible through a collaboration with CONACULTA and the Secretaría de Educación Pública.

The Ruelos Project, named after the founder of the Entremeses Cervantinos, was created in 2014 to pair artists with disadvantaged communities. The Festival provides logistical support but the actors and support staff are locals with that thirty participants in each event. The project is based on the original Entremeses Cervantinos done by Enrique Ruelos starting in the 1950s which relied on community participation to produce plays such as those by Shakespeare but modified to the local culture. The performances are planned and executed with communities where there are high levels of crime and family instability and violence, mostly in the state of Guanajuato. They have also worked with prison populations.

== Noted performers at the event ==
- Joffrey Ballet (1979)
- Ray Charles (1980)
- Rudolf Nureyev (1982)
- Arcade Fire (2010)
- Lila Downs (2014)
- Armando Manzanero (2015)
- Paquito D'Rivera (2015)
- Ballet Folklorico de Mexico (2015)

== See also ==
- Juan Escoto
- Ollin Yoliztli Prize
