= Cervantes Theater =

Coordinates: 21°0′47.7″N 101°15′1.97″W

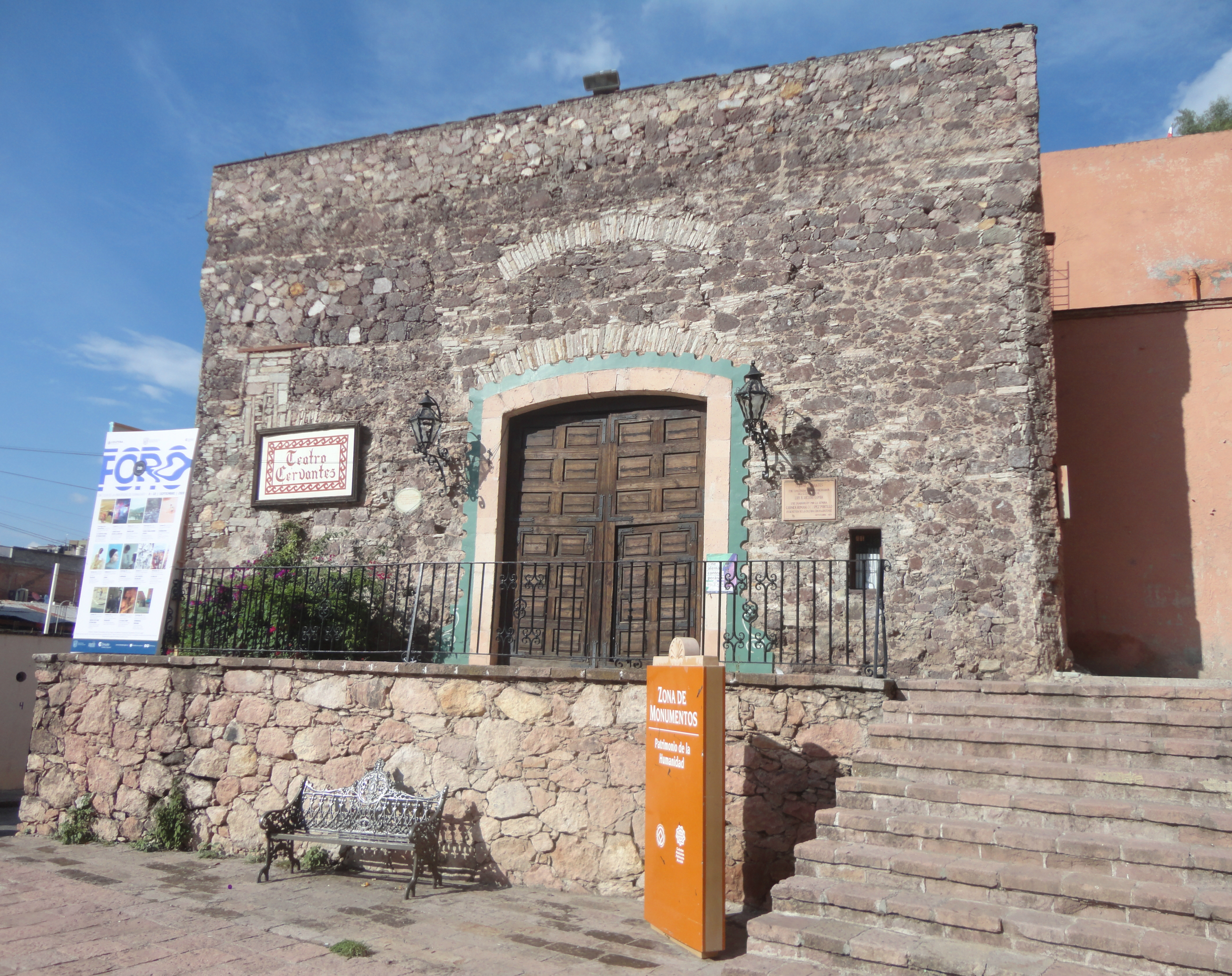
Teatro Cervantes

The Cervantes Theater (Spanish: Teatro Cervantes) is located in the Mexican city of Guanajuato. The building is of stone in the colonial style, designed by José Martínez Cossio and inaugurated in 1979. It is a venue of the Festival Internacional Cervantino, but also holds other events during the rest of the year.

== Description ==
The theater is a rectangular stone building in colonial style, and includes a large wooden double door on its facade. In front of the building is the Plaza Allende, which contains statues of Don Quijote and Sancho Panza on horseback. Inside, it has a capacity of 430 and a statue of writer Miguel de Cervantes Saavedra.

== History ==
The theater was designed by architect José Martínez Cossio and inaugurated on September 1, 1979. The first event held at the venue was a concert by pianist Guadalupe Parrondo. Previously, it was the site of the movie theater Cine Colonial, and the land once belonged to a hacienda dedicated to the smelting of metals.

On the fortieth anniversary of the Festival Cervantino, a time capsule was interred at the base of the Quijote and Sancho statues, which included a book documenting the first four decades of the event as well as photographs, letters and more.

== Function ==
The venue is primarily for the Festival Internacional Cervantino, with less-regular events during the rest of the year. These include the Festival de Titerías (puppets) and Andar de Paella, organized by the Universidad Santa Fe as part of a week-long city gastronomy festival. The theatre has hosted plays, operas, concerts, dances, shows for children, festivals, film events, and state and local political events.
