= Valenciana Mine =

Mine in Guanajuato, Mexico

Coordinates: 21.043631°N 101.258114°W

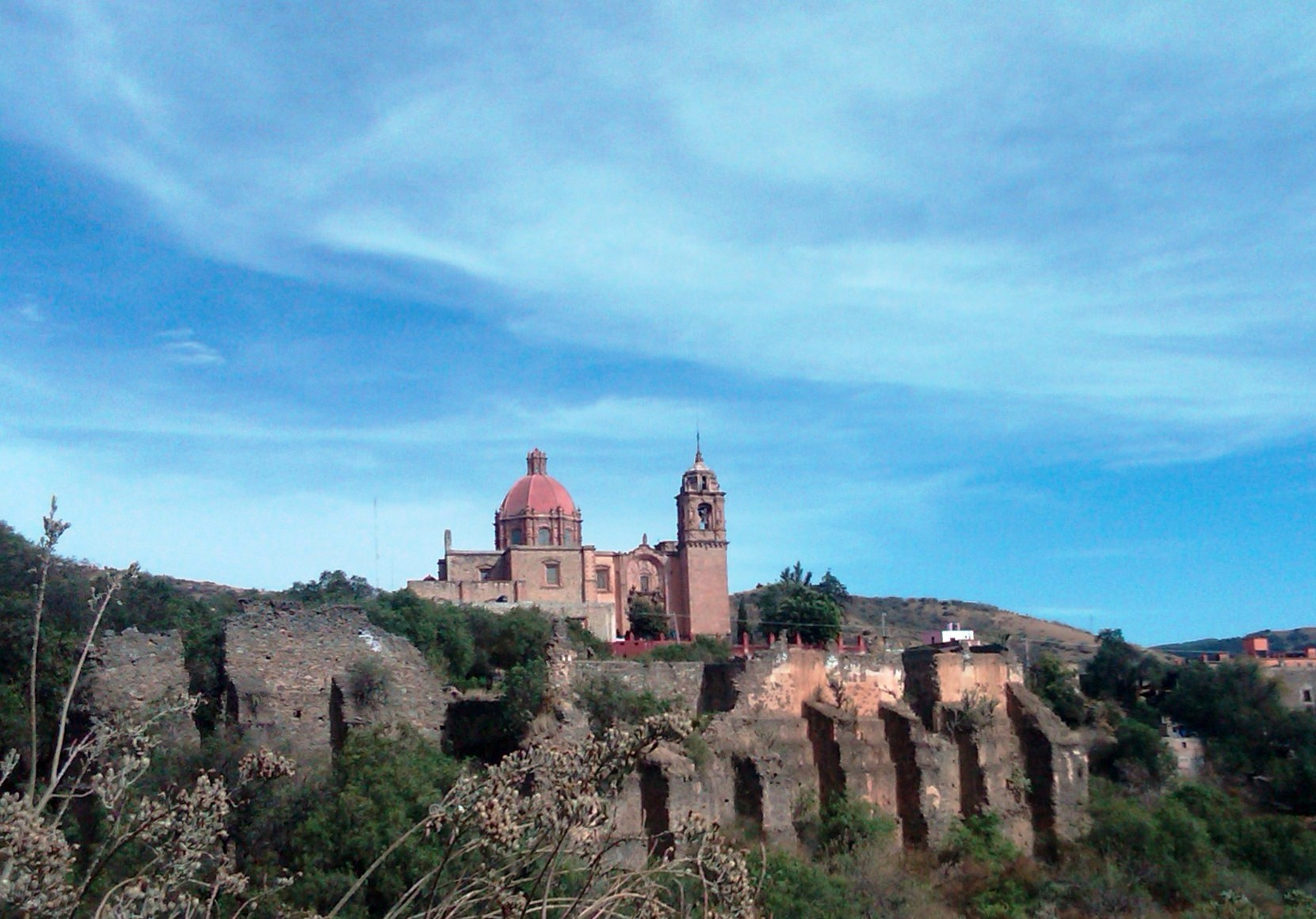
Complex of the Mina La Valenciana in Guanajuato, Mexico

The Valenciana Mine, known as Mina de La Valenciana in Spanish, is located in Guanajuato, Mexico. Valenciana is about 6 km from the Historic Center, Guanajuato, Guanajuato. La Valenciana Mine, Historic Guanajuato City, and surrounding mines are part of a UNESCO World Heritage Site. It began to exploit silver in the 16th century. Its extraction of silver was so abundant that its production was equivalent to two-thirds of the total that was obtained from this metal in all of New Spain. Currently, it belongs to the Santa Fe Cooperative Society of Metallurgical Mines of Guanajuato and continues to be exploited at a depth of 760 meters.

== History ==
Although the mother vein of Guanajuato was discovered in 1548, the Valenciana mine reached its highest production levels from 1768 to 1804. The mine produced 60% of the world silver production in the 18th century. In 1760, the young Antonio de Obregón y Alcocer obtained a loan from the merchant of the Rayas mine, Pedro Luciano Otero. For several years, they both continued investing in the mine until in 1768 their production increased considerably. For several decades, the La Valenciana mine produced more silver than all the mines in the Viceroyalty of Peru, being Obregon's partners, Messrs. Otero and Diego Rul. On 20 March 1780, the King Charles III of Spain – at the request of the Viceroy Antonio María de Bucareli y Ursúa – granted Obregón the titles of Viscount de la Mina and count of La Valenciana, located in Guanajuato, Mexico.

In 1788, his son Antonio Alonso de Obregón and de la Barreda succeeded him. Although he inherited the titles, the property of the mine was divided into twenty-four shares, the descendants of Obregón kept ten shares, the family of Otero twelve shares and the family of Juan Antonio de Santa Ana two actions. On 8 August 1803, Alexander von Humboldt visited the mine, according to his "Political Essay on the Kingdom of New Spain" the mine had "given its owners four hundred to six hundred million pesos, at least, of annual utility." During its good years, more than three thousand workers were employed. In 1803, the mine was exploited to a depth of 185 meters; in 1810, its production was suspended. By 1815, the depth reached for its exploitation was 514 meters.

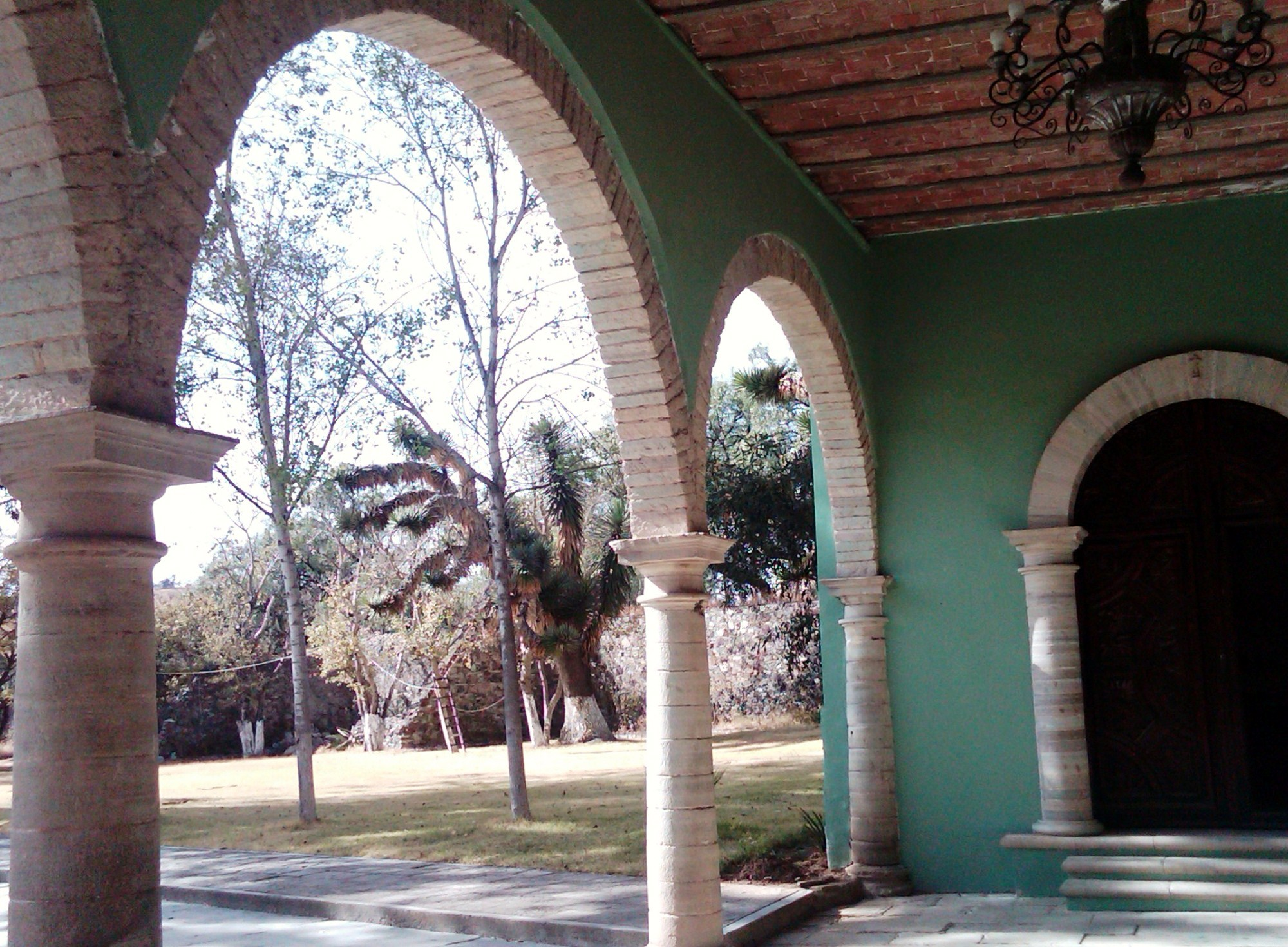
Interior of the headquarters of the Mina La Valenciana in Guanajuato, Mexico

In 1810, during the beginning of the War of the Independence of Mexico, most of the miners participated in the Capture of the Grain Exchange at Granaditas. Shortly after, they formed the Valencia regiment that was under the orders Colonel Casimiro Chovell and mine engineer Ramón Fabié. In 1817, Xavier Mina tried to take the plaza of Guanajuato. When he failed in his objective, he ordered the mine's machinery to be set on fire.

From 1848 to 1865, the administration of La Valenciana was in the hands of Francisca Pérez de Gálvez. Towards the end of this cycle, the family company was undercapitalized with several of its mines flooded. In 1865, her nephew Miguel Rul took over the administration, undertaking a rehabilitation process. By selling his agricultural properties, he injected capital into his mining properties. In 1872, he formed the Restorative Company of Valenciana and in 1877 La Concordia to work the mines of Mellado and Rayas. In addition, he invested in other mines of the Casa Rul in Guanajuato.

By 1878, La Valenciana was able to produce again the largest volume of silver in Guanajuato, achieving a total of 15,000 tons in 1887. But, the average volume of extraction fell to 5,900 tons between 1885 and 1888. By 1889 only 2,400 tons were extracted. In the decade of 1890, the Mining Negotiation of Casa Rul in Guanajuato was in frank crisis. In addition to the low productivity, the metal price decreased by 40%. When Miguel Rul died in 1897, the administration was led by his widow Mariana Olmedo and his brother-in-law José Olmedo. The Olmedos – who also came from a mining family in the State of Hidalgo – operated the mines from 1898 to 1904 through the Mining Negotiation of Casa Rul in Guanajuato. In 1900 the production of La Valenciana was reduced by half and continued to lower its extraction volumes during the following three years. In 1904, the Olmedos sold the company to the American company, Guanajuato Reduction and Mines Company.

During the Mexican Revolution most of the mining works were suspended, from 1922 the investment of American capital reactivated this sector. However, the situation changed with the crisis of 1929 and the decrease in production of the mines registered in Mexico. In 1936, a strike of miners in La Valenciana lasted until 1937. Due to these labor problems and the decrease in productivity, finally, the mine passed into the hands of the workers of section 4 of the National Union of Mining, Metallurgical and Similar Workers of the Mexican Republic, who formed the Cooperativa Minera Metalúrgica Santa Fe de Guanajuato.

== San Cayetano Temple of the Confessor ==
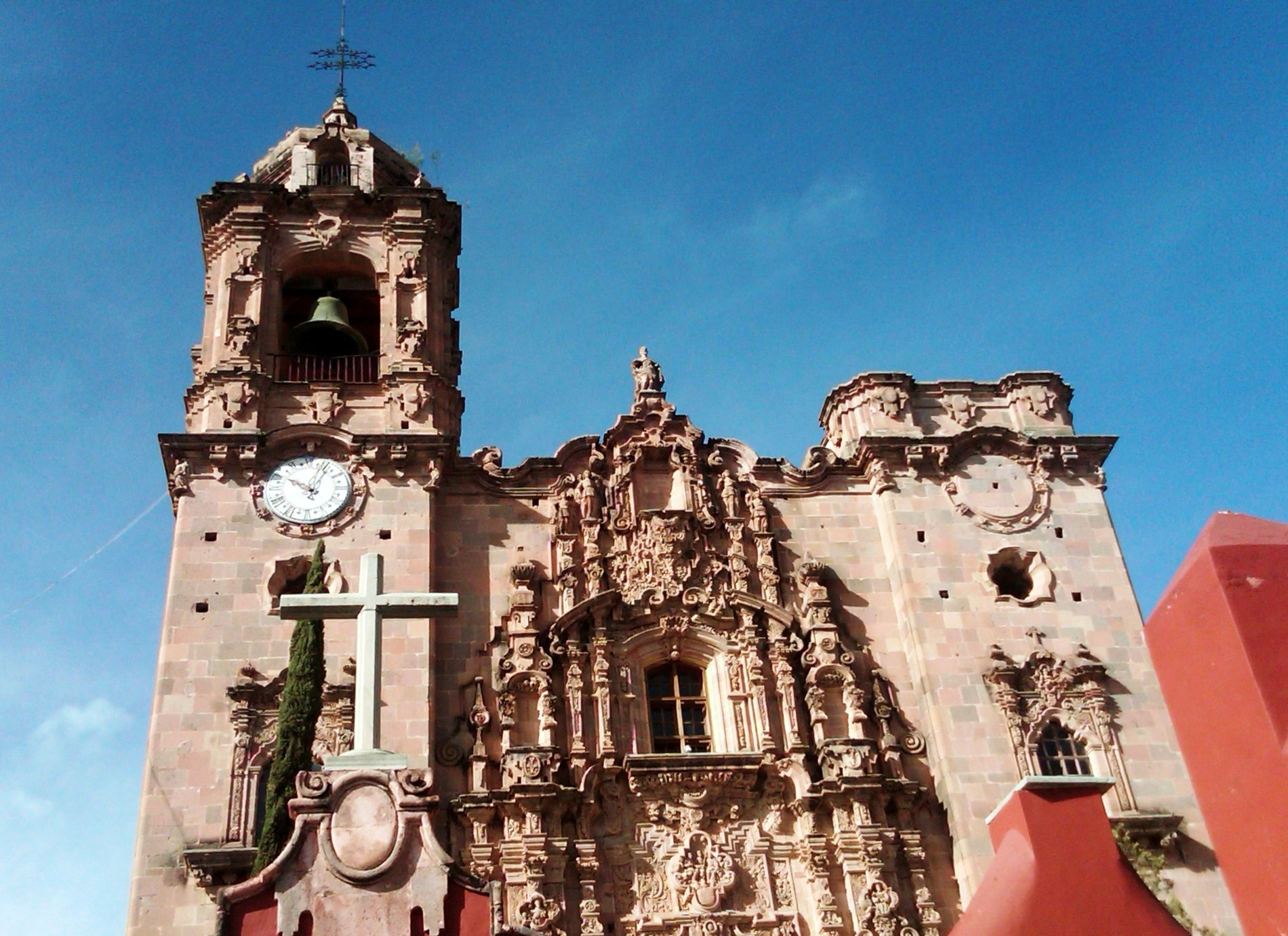
Temple of San Cayetano of the Confessor, Guanajuato, Mexico

In the town that grew next to the mine, the church dedicated to San Cayetano was built. Antonio de Obregón y Alcocer commissioned the church in thanks for his good fortune. Its construction began in 1775 and was completed in 1788. The work was directed by the architects Andrés de la Riva and Jorge Archundia, from quarry rose and his style is churrigueresque.

== The La Valenciana Mine Museum ==
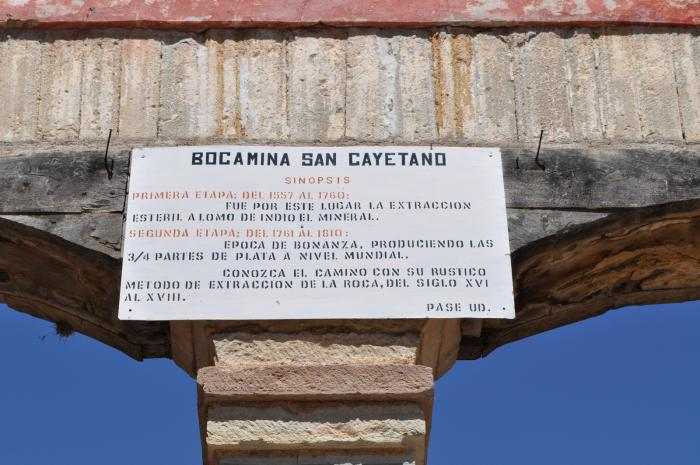
Entrance sign on aqueduct archway at entrance to La Valenciana Mine in La Valencia, Guanajuato, Guanajuato

The mine is spread out underground, below the region North-east of Guanajuato City. The mouth of the mine is known as Bocamina and is located in the town of Valenciana, directly behind the outside wall of the local church, San Cayetano. Local guides will take people around to the old mining facilities and down in the mine by way of a long, steep staircase. The Mexican government has paid for a modern, interactive museum on the site.

== Bibliography ==
- Canudas Sandoval, Enrique (2005). Las venas de plata en la historia de México. Síntesis de histoghkr tee tee voria económica siglo XIX, volumen III. Villahermosa: Universidad Juárez Autónoma de Tabasco. ISBN 970-94243-3-5.
- Humboldt, Alexander von (1822). Ensayo político sobre el reino de la Nueva España. París: Casa de Rosa.
- Manso Porto, Carmen (2008). "La colección cartográfica de América de Alexander von Humboldt conservada en la Real Academia de la Historia". Boletín de la Real Academia de la Historia. Tomo CCV – cuaderno III. pp. 537–590.
- Sánchez Rangel, Óscar (2010). "La última etapa de una empresa minera familiar en Guanajuato. La antigua Casa Rul (1898–1903)". Legajos (4). México: Archivo General de la Nación: 13–42. ISSN 0185-1926.
- Uribe Salas, José Alfredo (2010). Historia económica y social de la Compañía y Cooperativa Minera Las Dos Estrellas, en El Oro y Tlalpujahua, 1898–1959. Madrid: CSCIC -Departamento de Publicaciones. ISBN 978-840-009-237-5.
