= Pietro Casani =

Italian priest (1570–1647)

Blessed Pietro Casani S.P.
- Image of Pietro Casani in Strážnice

Priest
- Born: 8 September 1570; Lucca, Grand Duchy of Tuscany
- Died: 17 October 1647 (aged 77); Rome, Papal States
- Venerated in: Roman Catholic Church
- Beatified: 1 October 1995, Saint Peter's Square, Vatican City by Pope John Paul II
- Feast: 17 October
- Attributes: Priest's cassock; Crucifix

Pietro Casani (8 September 1570 – 17 October 1647) was an Italian Roman Catholic priest and a professed member of the Piarists. He became an assistant and a close personal friend of Giuseppe Calasanz. Casani had assumed the religious name of "Pietro della Natività di Maria" upon his solemn profession and had once been part of the Congregazione della Beata Vergine Maria that Giovanni Leonardi founded.

Casani served in numerous roles of leadership within the Piarists due to being a close assistant to Calasanz and travelled across the Italian peninsula for visitations of various houses while living in Rome and Naples as part of his duties.

He was an advocate for the religious of the order being poor and moved to the Piarists from Leonardi's for that exact reason.

His beatification cause commenced on 22 March 1922 - under Pope Pius XI and he became titled as a Servant of God: the first stage in the sainthood process. He was made Venerable in 1991 and Pope John Paul II beatified him in Saint Peter's Square on 1 October 1995.

== Life ==
=== Childhood and education ===
Pietro Casani was born in Lucca on 8 September 1570 as the sole child to Gaspare Casani (d. 1626) and Elisabetta Drago (d. 1591) - both were from old noble families.

In his childhood he studied the humanities and music and he could use several musical instruments. On important liturgical events - at the Observance Saint Francis' Church - he was stationed at the organ. The Franciscan Order oversaw his education in Lucca - where he graduated in both theological and philosophical studies.

=== Joining Leonardi ===
He felt called to enter the Congregazione della Beata Vergine Maria - that Giovanni Leonardi founded - after his mother's death in 1591. The death of his mother and his own departure left his father alone and he later became blind. Gaspare later joined his son in Leonardi's order in 1613 and died later in 1626. In Lucca he founded the "Congregazione di Nostra Signora della Neve for adolescents.

Notes recorded on 31 January 1593 note: "He defended in public, in the Church of Saint Francis, 100 conclusions of philosophy" with members of the Order of Preachers and the Servites and Augustinians. His friends also tested his virtues: on one occasion his friends invited him to play a harpsichord and while he was doing that the group left and allowed a girl to enter. Casani realized what had happened and asked that the door be unlocked so he could leave. He decided he couldn't face the insinuations of the girl for much longer so jumped out of a window while injuring his leg in the process; this injury remained with him throughout his life.

In April 1594 he asked to be admitted into Leonardi's order and a chronicle from the order stated: "God, in His mercy, this year of 1594, moved the heart of a young man who was educated with us, since he belonged to our parish, the son of the good Gaspare, called the blind ... and because his vocation was thought as a miracle, having a father of such a terrible nature; our fathers did not care of taking him for six months as a test; on the contrary, he took the habit the following Monday of the liberty Sunday. He was really good, convincing many to the religious life; even his father, although blind, entered with us".

His novice master in the institute was the priest Giovanni Battista Cioni (1556-1623). Leonardi met Casani around this time and took him to Rome on 14 March 1596 and later - on the orders of Pope Clement VIII - undertook a visitation with Leonardi to the Congregation of Monte Vergine in Naples; it lasted five years. During his sojourn to Naples neither he nor Leonardi knew that the local bishops were 'testing' Casani and wanted him to join their own priesthood but Casani wanted to remain with Leonardi. It was in Naples that he received the tonsure and the first two minor orders; he made his vows of obedience and perseverance in October 1597 and in November 1557 received two more minor orders and a patrimony of 500 escudos in order to receive the major orders.

He was called to Rome in 1598 and studied the teachings of Thomas Aquinas at the Jesuit Roman College since in Lucca he had studied the teachings of Escoto. He was ordained to the priesthood in the Basilica of Saint John Lateran on 23 September 1600. From September to November 1601 he travelled with Leonardi on a visitation to a group of monks in Vallombrosa and assisted there in drafting the rules for novices and the constitutions for Leonardi's congregation. In the spring of 1604 the order held a meeting in Rome for final consultations on the constitutions and he was named as both secretary and notary to the proceedings; it was at this meeting he met and familiarized himself with Cardinal Cesare Baronio. He made his solemn profession on 22 July 1604 at Saint Mary in Portico.

In November 1595 he was stationed in Rome and made the vice-rector of the Roman house; he lived there from 1605 until 1608. In October 1608 the second general congregation was held at the Roman house. Leonardi died on 9 October 1609 and was replaced with Alessandro Bernardini. Leonardi's death in 1609 prompted Cardinal Benedetto Giustiniani in 1613 to suggest to the institute to offer their assistance to Joseph Calasanz and his new religious congregation known as the Piarists. Calasanz wished to unite the two institutes together which enabled Pope Paul V to approve the union in 1614 and Leonardi's order became known as the Congregation of the Mother of God. Casani was - in 1614 - made the rector of Saint Pantaleon's: the headquarters of the Piarists. From 1613 until 1614 he lived in Trevi near Rome and opened a study house there and in 1614 preached a Lenten retreat at the church of San Lorenzo in Damaso. Paul V - in March 1617 - decided to split the two congregations which prompted Casani to leave his order in order to join Calasanz and he became a close friend and assistant.

=== Piarists and Priesthood ===
Father Erba discusses the reason Casani left the order for Calasanz's: "Father Pietro did not leave our congregation because he was disgusted, but rather because he wanted to live that poverty and strictness that lived from the beginning of the Pious Schools". On the Feast of the Assumption (and Holy Saturday) - 25 March 1617 - Calasanz and fourteen others assumed the Piarist habit and assumed new names; Casani assumed the religious name of "Pietro of the Nativity of Mary". In unofficial documents he signed his name as "Pietro Povero" (Peter the Poor).

In April 1617 he made his temporary profession into the hands of Calasanz and professed his three vows. It was at this time he was made novice master and in October 1618 left Rome for Narni in Terni alongside seven companions. In mid 1819 Calasanz called him to Rome and in 1622 the order was made official in a decree that Pope Gregory XV issued. On 20 April 1622, he and Calasanz made their solemn profession into the hands of Cardinal Michelangelo Tonti - the cardinal died the following day. The two then renewed them in public at the Basilica di Santa Maria Maggiore. The following month he presented the institute's constitution to the people of Narni as well as in Carcare and Fanano.

Around this time he travelled to Savona alongside two companions. On 10 July 1623, he was appointed as the provincial of the Liguria province of the congregation. In February 1624 he was made the novice master of the Genoa novitiate. He made a pilgrimage to Turin that same year in order to view the Shroud of Turin. For the Holy Year of 1625, he was in Rome and arrived in September with six novices. In March 1626 he left Rome for Messina with two religious and made a detour to Naples where they remained for two months; he set sail for Sicily at the end of May and took his position as rector.

On 14 July 1626, he received the profession of two novices and one more the following November. On 14 April 1627, he was back in Naples and made rector of a house there while he attended the first general congregation of the Piarists from 11 October to 4 November 1627; he then left Rome the following 15 November. In 1628 he suffered sciatica and was forced to rest until he recovered his strength. He was back in Rome in 1630 and wrote a testimony for the beatification of Glicerio Landriani (1588-1618) despite being against beatifying members of the Piarists; Calasanz asked him to do this even more so due to the fact that Casani was with Landriani at the point of his death. In 1631 he helped open the house of the order in Cosenza and moved to Naples; he lived there until October when he went back to Rome for the general chapter.

He began to teach both philosophy and theology in the novitiate of Quattro Fontane in Rome in 1631. On 23 February 1633 he oversaw the vesting of the habit to seven novices and then went to visit a sick person in Genoa on 21 April 1634. In December 1634 he was summoned to Rome. At the beginning of 1637 he was gravely ill and was confined to rest until he recovered; he was able to resume his duties in April 1638 when he was made the general commissary for the Piarists in the Holy Roman Empire, when the order was in Moravia. He arrived in Mikulov on 12 May 1638 with one cleric and two priests while on 1 July 1638 he attended the welcoming ceremony the city gave to the new Emperor Ferdinand III. He subsequently stayed at the Piarist college in Strážnice. He published a written account of the region.

Casani fell ill with the fever in October 1638 which began a series of misfortunes for him and the religious congregation. The Holy Office on 8 August 1642 summoned Calasanz and several others while Pope Urban VIII - on 15 January 1643 - ordered an immediate visitation of the Piarists which began on 2 March 1643 that Father Augustine Ubaldini undertook.

=== Illness and death ===
In September 1647 - in a letter - Calasanz noted that Casani "is rather sick". Casani died due to his ill health on 17 October 1647 at 2:30am and Calasanz was with him in his final moments; the latter communicated news of his death to the rest of the order the following 20 October.

== Beatification ==
The death of the priest prompted Calasanz to write several letters requesting that a cause of canonization commence for Casani. The process opened on two fronts in both Rome and Lucca in which an informative process opened in 1692 but later stalled before it could close. Theologians also took possession of his writings and approved them as being in line with the faith on 23 July 1919.

On 22 March 1922 - under Pope Pius XI - the cause opened on an official level and Casani was granted the title of Servant of God: the first official stage in the process.

An apostolic process was held not long after this following a period of inaction and the process spanned from 1930 until such time when documents became lost; these documents for the cause were relocated in 1964 and revitalized the process. The previous processes were validated by the Congregation for the Causes of Saints on 12 January 1990 which allowed for the postulation to submit the Positio to the C.C.S. that same year.

On 22 January 1991 he was proclaimed to be Venerable after Pope John Paul II confirmed that the late priest had lived a model Christian life of heroic virtue. The pontiff also approved a miracle attributed to him on 15 December 1994 and beatified Casani in Saint Peter's Square on 1 October 1995.

The miracle in question - in Szeged in Hungary - was the cure of a woman in hospital who was cured due to kissing an image of Casani that a Piarist priest gave her. It was investigated and was later re-examined for his beatification.

The current postulator that is assigned to the cause is the Piarist Mateusz Pindelski.
