= National Theatre of Japan =

Theater and performing arts center in Tokyo, Japan

- 国立劇場
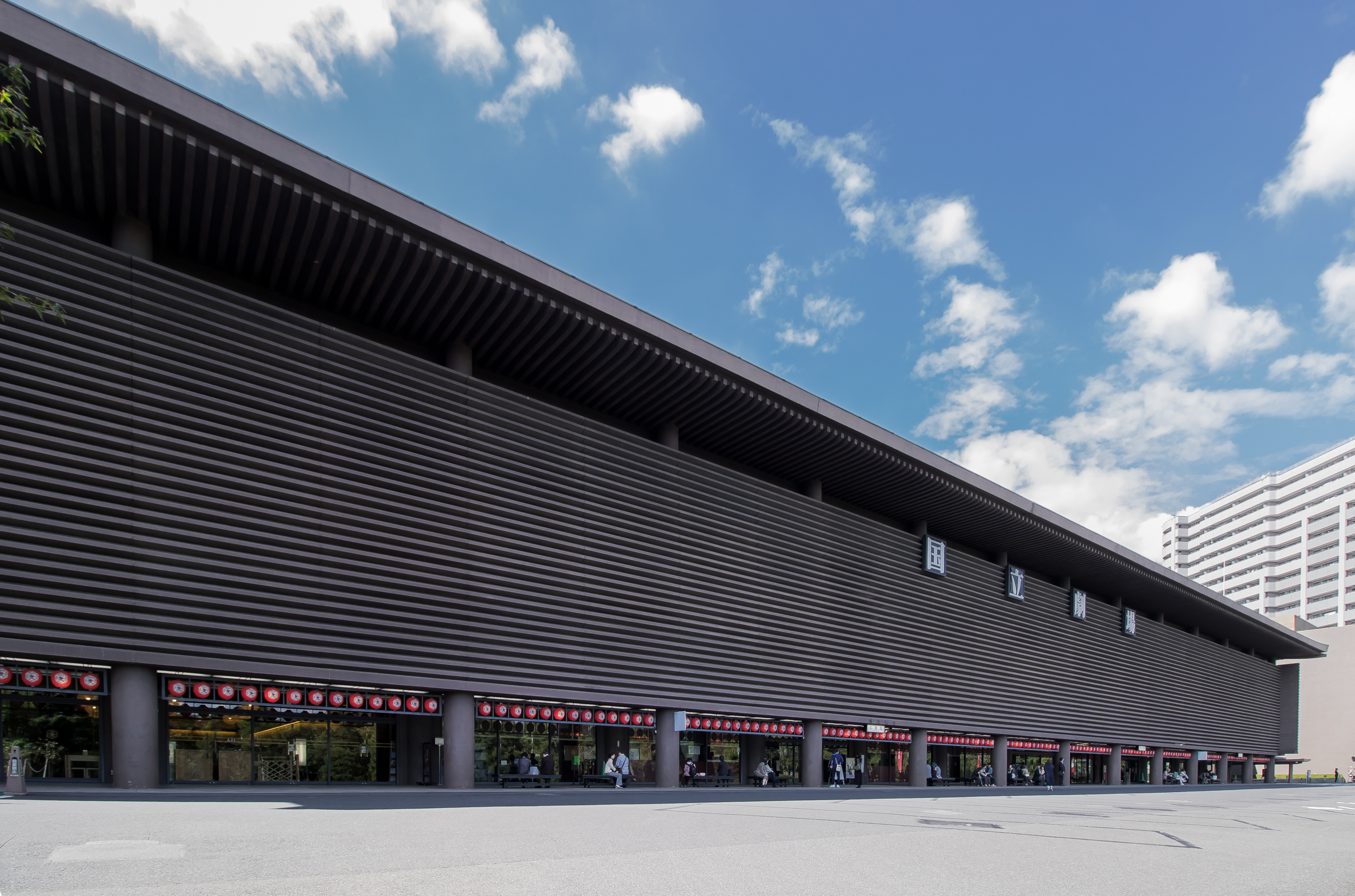
- The exterior of the National Theatre building recalls the ancient azekura-zukuri style of the Shōsōin.
- Interactive map of National Theatre of Japan
- Address: 4-1 Hayabusa-chō, Chiyoda-ku; Tokyo; Japan
- Coordinates: 35°40′53″N 139°44′35″E
- Capacity: 1,610 (The Large Theatre)

Construction
- Opened: 1966
- Architect: Hiroyuki Iwamoto

Website
- https://www.ntj.jac.go.jp/kokuritsu.html

The National Theatre of Japan (国立劇場, Kokuritsu Gekijō) is a complex consisting of three halls in two buildings in Hayabusachō, a district in Chiyoda, Tokyo, Japan. The Japan Arts Council, an Independent Administrative Institution of the Ministry of Education, Culture, Sports, Science and Technology, operates the National Theatre. It primarily stages performances of traditional Japanese performing arts. The National Theatre is currently closed for the “National Theatre Reconstruction Project - Towards a New Adventure” since the end of October 2023.

== Outline ==
The main building has two halls. The Large Theatre hosts performances of kabuki and buyō (Japanese classical dance) as well as stage plays. The Small Hall specializes in bunraku, Japanese music, smaller buyō productions, gagaku, shōmyō, and folk theatre. In a separate building, the Engei Hall stages rakugo and manzai performances.

Each year in April, the awards ceremony for the Japan Prize takes place in the National Theatre. Attendees include the Emperor and Empress, the Prime Minister, the President of the House of Councillors, and the Speaker of the House of Representatives.

== Performances ==
The 1995 Japanese Drumming Concert, sponsored by the National Theatre of Japan, featured artists such as Tokyo Dagekidan.

In 2010, a double bill of Yukio Mishima's Iwashi Uri Koi Hikiami and Roben Sugi no Yurai was performed.

In February 2019, the Farewell Jubilee celebrations for the Emperor Akihito took place.
