= Circo Aereo =

Circus group based in Finland and France

Circo Aereo is a circus group based in Finland and France, under the direction of Maksim Komaro, the artistic director, and Jani Nuutinen, the artistic consultant. This group was established in 1996 as part of the “new circus” movement and travels frequently around the world.

The circus is one of the most active Finnish group touring abroad, having appeared in theaters and in cultural festivals in about thirty countries. Circo Aereo has been called “a sparkling tribute to the circus” (Le Figaro, France), “half circus, half cabaret” (Le Monde, France) and “a treasure chest full of the things of which circus is made, filled with beautiful sights, meticulous joint efforts and inventive surprises” (Helsingin Sanomat, Finland) . Circo Aereo also has held workshops for schools and circus performers, along with other educational projects.

In order to develop the concept of the traditional circus, Circo Aereo incorporates other art forms into its shows, such as elements of theatre and dance, with audience interaction playing an important part. Super 8 was created in 2004, which combined traditional magic tricks, super 8 films and elements of video games. Trippo was also created in 2004 and geared for children, playing mostly in Scandinavian countries and France.

In 2005, Circo Aereo created two musically dominant shows. The first was called the Louisiana Circus, co produced with the UMO Jazz Orchestra and in collaboration with Fritt Fall Rinne Radio, a Finnish electro-jazz band. This production consisted of six artists and twenty musicians, combining circus with a cabaret atmosphere.

In 2007, an air show called “Piece for Two Ropes” opened, choreographed by Sanna Silvernnoinen and another show called FUR! by Maksim Komaro, both with the aim of combining contemporary circus and contemporary dance. In the latter production, artists from various countries, traditions and specialties created their own variations of traditional movements. Circo Aereo has worked with Sirque, pole circus Nexon in Limousin since 2007.

Circo Aereo’s most recent production is called “Espresso,” which is performed along with French juggling group Les Objets Volants. The show features four artists who create scenes and stories, on the ground and in the air, with juggling, dance and aerials, but no words. According to director Maksim Komaro, Espresso is a journey through the history of circus, following Komaros own circus experience from the traditional to cabaret and the contemporary circus of Europe. Espresso is one of Circo Aereo's biggest successes. Helsingin Sanomat called the work “a treasure chest filled with beautiful sights, meticulous efforts and inventive surprises,” while Le Monde said, “intelligence and virtuosity are embedded in the magical vignettes.”

The show was created in 2006, touring for three years in and around Europe especially in the Parc de la Villette in Paris, at the Théâtre de Vidy-Lausanne in Switzerland and the Damascus Opera House, Syria. In 2009, the show and the circus itself made its North American debut, performing eight eastern U.S. states. This tour was considered important to opening up the North American circus market to less-traditional shows. In 2011, Espresso and Circo Aereo returned to the continent to perform at Wabash College in Indiana, Brigham Young University in Utah and the Festival Internacional Cervantino in Guanajuato, Mexico .
