= Escoto =

Escoto is a surname. Notable people with the surname include:

- Alberto Escoto (born 1925), Cuban basketball player
- Juan Escoto (1894–1975), Mexican writer and politician
- Julio Escoto (born 1944), Honduran writer
- Nazario Escoto, Nicaraguan politician and President of Nicaragua
