= Les Objets Volants =

Les Objets Volants is a juggling group from France that mixes juggling with humor, movement and theatre. The group has been producing shows in France and around the world since 1999, including elements of circus, theater, visual arts and even mathematics. It is under the direction of Denis Paumier, and focused on the experimentation with objects and new techniques of manipulating them.

Juggling rapidly rose in popularity in France at the end of the 1980s, with names such as the like Institut de Jonglage and Jérôme Thomas creating innovations that would influence later jugglers. In the late 1980s and early 1990s, the Centre National des Arts du Cirque de Châlons-en-Champagne was an important operating center for jugglers with names such as Didier André, Thierry André, Jörg Müller, Mads Rosenbeck, Laurent Pareti as well as Denis Paumier. The company was founded in 1999 by Denis Paumier, Toon Schuermans and David Fischer. The three first met at the tenth congress of the Center National des Arts du Cirque. The first show the trio produced was called Impers et Passes, which mixed juggling, theater, movement, music and humor. Since then, the group has remained under the direction of Denis Paumier but with new members. Les Objets Volants continues to participate actively in international juggling events as this allows the troupe to have contacts with other artists from around the world and to incorporate ideas from these events into their own work.

In 2001, Les Objets Volants performed at the Dans la Jongle des Villes Festival.

Since 2006, the group has collaborated with the Circo Aereo from Finland to create and perform a show called "Espresso". Espresso is a show featuring four artists who create scenes and stories, on the ground and in the air, with juggling, dance and aerials, but no words. The show is a fast-paced history of the circus. Circo Aereo director Maksim Komaro states that it follows his own circus experience, from the traditional to cabaret and the contemporary circus of Europe and elements of each are found in the show.

Espresso is one of Circo Aereo's biggest successes. Finnish newspaper Helsingin Sanomat called the work "a treasure chest filled with beautiful sights, meticulous efforts and inventive surprises", while France's Le Monde said, "intelligence and virtuosity are embedded in the magical vignettes". The show toured extensively for three years, with the venues during the first year mainly being the Parc de la Villette in Paris, the Théâtre de Vidy-Lausanne in Switzerland and the Damascus Opera House, Syria. In 2009, Circo Aereo toured the United States for four weeks, performing the show Espresso in theaters in mostly eastern states. This tour was considered important to opening up the North American circus market to less-traditional shows.

In 2011, the show was presented at Wabash College, Brigham Young University and at the Festival Internacional Cervantino in Guanajuato, Mexico.
