= Tokyo Dagekidan =

Japanese taiko drumming group

Tokyo Dagekidan 東京打撃団
- Origin: Japan
- Genre: Taiko drumming
- Years active: 1995–present
- Website: www.dagekidan.com/info/

Tokyo Dagekidan (東京打撃団, Tōkyō Dagekidan) is a six-man taiko drumming group. founded in 1995 by Jin-ichi Hiranuma. The name comes from the city the group is from (Tokyo) along with the Japanese words for group (dageki) and "strike hard" (dan).

One of their main goals is to revive and conserve traditional taiko drumming, such as that heard in imperial palaces, with their focus on the various sizes and styles of these drums from the odaiko to the shime-daiko. However, they have experimented with adding other elements to the traditional rhythms, both to modernize and experiment with what the drums can do. Despite the name, not all the drumming is loud. There are more subtle performances as well as accompaniment by other instruments such as flutes, cowbells, gongs and vocals. The group has collaborated with Chinese percussionist Meng Xiao Liang, tomback drummer Esfandiar Lali of Iran and vocalist Sergio Vargas of the Dominican Republic.

Tokyo Dagekidan first performed publicly with the Japanese Drumming Concert sponsored by the National Theater of Japan. They perform at various taiko festivals, as well as cultural and educational events around Japan. Abroad, the group has performed in countries such as Indonesia (1996), tours of France and Africa in 2000, Europe (U.K., Belgium, Finland and Germany) in 2000, Russia (2003), toured the Caribbean in 2004 (Barbados, Cuba and Dominican Republic), toured Thailand, Malaysia and Brunei in 2007. They played representing Japan at the closing ceremonies of the 1998 FIFA World Cup in France. In 2012 and 2014, the group toured various cultural festivals in Mexico and inaugurated the Festival Internacional Cervantino, a performance attended by Prince Fumihito Akishino and his wife Kiko.

Tokyo Dagekidan also appeared in Kyoki no Sakura, a film produced by Toei.

== Members ==
- Murayama Jiro on Bansuri
- Tomofumi Tagawa on Taiko
- Kato Takuya on Taiko
- Yokoyama Ryosuke on Taiko
- Tsuyuki Kazuhiro on Taiko
- Sato Akihiro on Taiko
- Hasegawa Toru Taiko (alternate)
