= Vivarium (Milwaukee) =

Concert venue in Milwaukee Wisconsin

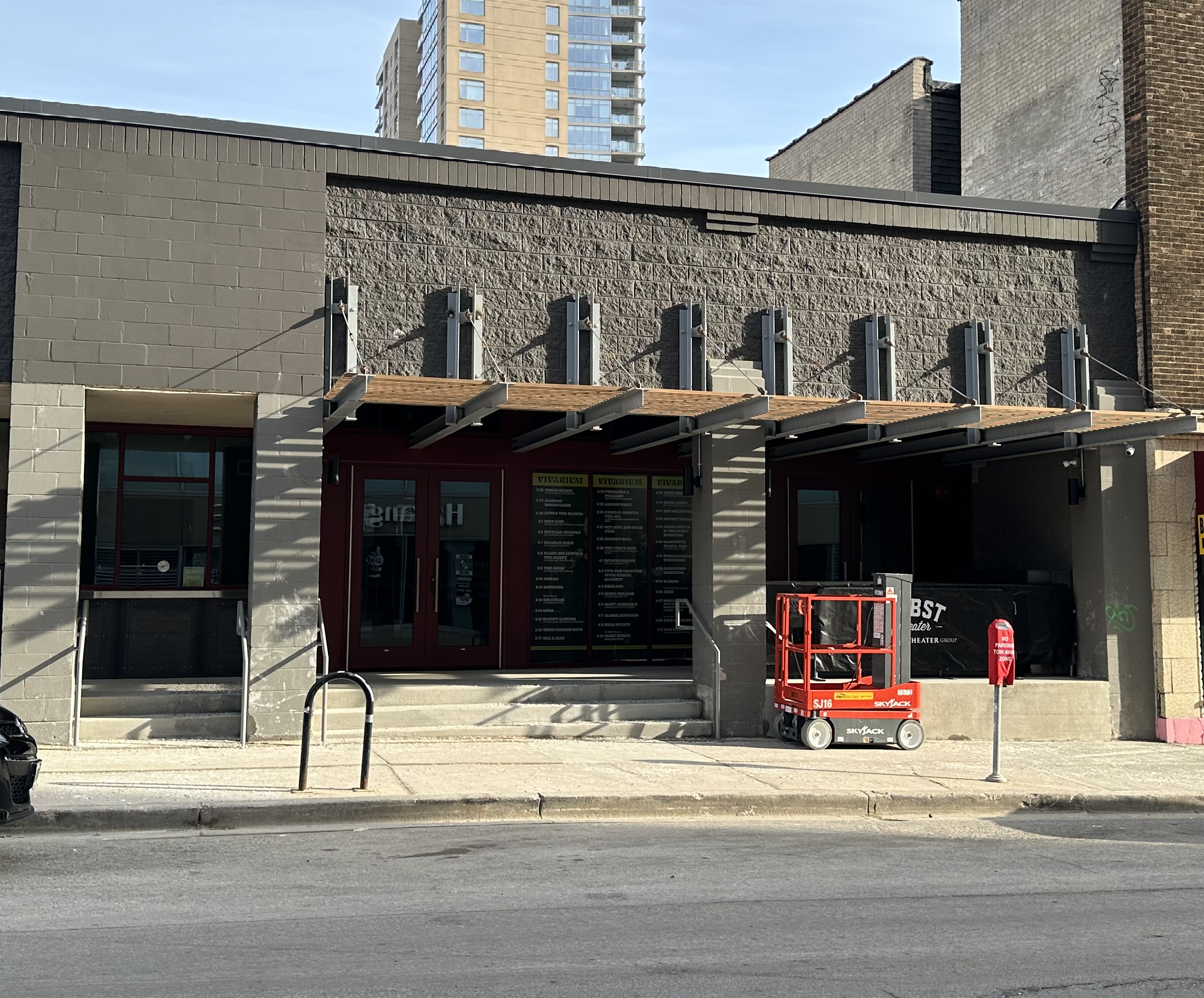

- Location in Wisconsin Location in the United States
- Address: 1818 N. Farwell Avenue; Milwaukee; US
- Coordinates: 43.054167°N 87.890833°W
- Owner: Pabst Theater Group
- Seating type: General Admission
- Capacity: 450
- Current use: Concert venue

Construction
- Groundbreaking: 2023
- Built: 2024
- Opened: 20 February 2024
- Architect: Kubala Washatko Architects

Vivarium is a 450 seat concert venue in Milwaukee, Wisconsin. It is operated by the Pabst Theater Group and it is located on the East side of Milwaukee in a strip mall.

== History ==
The concert venue is owned by the Pabst Theater Group and is located at 1818 N. Farwell Avenue in Milwaukee Wisconsin. The designed of the 450 seat venue was Kubala Washatko Architects. The concert hall was created from a vacant space. Its grand opening occurred in 2024.

On February 20, 2024, the first concert was held at the hall and hip-hop artists Wave Chapelle and Adorner played. The Vivarium's shows have general admission with a large floor area and a stage which is 2 ft (0.61 m) off of the floor.

== Description ==
The building is located on the East side of Milwaukee in a strip mall. The interior walls are adorned with wood from Wisconsin trees which are 100 years old. The space has eight skylights. A local artist created lighting fixtures and the bathrooms feature large mirrors with built in lighting. The building also features cream city brick and living plants. Gary Witt, president and CEO of Pabst Theater Group said, "Upon entry, guests will be immersed in a truly living space, where an industrial aesthetic of brick and steel meets the lush serenity of real plants and greenery. It will be a living, breathing space...". The building also features a white arched ceiling and elevated beams which also carry plants.
