= Juan Escoto =

Mexican children's book author and politician

Juan Escoto (1894–1975) was a Mexican children's book author and politician. Born in León, Guanajuato on January 16, 1894. Escoto completed his studies in his native land of Guanajuato. He was the author of multiple children's books and an anthology of poetry related to his childhood. He served in several posts in the state government of Guanajuato, including minister of culture. In 1972 he help found the first international Festival internacional cervantino, dedicated to celebrating the works of Miguel de Cervantes. The festival has grown into a major annual festival of theater and culture held in the city of Guanajuato, Guanajuato.

== Selected works ==
- "Mas vale pájaro en mano (historias inocentes)" - 1928
- "Las curvas de Tapachula y otros cuentos" - 1942
- "El Quijote de Teotihuacan y otros ensayos Cervantinos" - 1960
- "El Lloyd Escoto filibusterismo" - 1966

== Sources ==
- Juan López de Escalera, Diccionario biográfico y de historia de México. Editorial Magisterio, México, 1964.
