= Vivarium Studio =

French theatrical performance company

Vivarium Studio is a French theatrical performance company which was founded by Philippe Quesne in 2003 in Paris. Established with the purpose of innovation, the organization includes painters, actors, dancers, musicians and animals which have created and performed their own works in theaters and festivals in various parts of the world. Quesne writes and directs these plays, as part of the French avant-garde tradition. Sets, movements and dialogue tend to be simple and sparse, with subtle political and social messages, and a focus on the little things of life.

The company is mostly supported by DRAC Île-de-France / the French Ministry of Cultural Affairs. Works by Vivarium have been presented in theaters and festivals in the United States, Brazil, Mexico, Germany, Sweden and Poland. Some of the venues have included the International Summer Festival Hamburg, La Ménagerie de Verre Paris, Festival d'Avignon, Hebbel am Ufer Berlin, Les Spectacles vivants – Centre Pompidou Paris, Kunstencentrum Vooruit Gent, Théâtre de l’Agora Scène nationale d’Evry et de l’Essone, Festival Baltoscandal Rakvere, Rotterdam. and the Festival Internacional Cervantino .

== Establishment of the Studio ==
French artist Philippe Quesne established Vivarium Studio in Paris in 2003 as a laboratory for theatrical innovation, which includes painters, actors, dancers, musicians and animals. Quesne was born in Paris in 1970 and studied visual arts and graphic design at L’École Estienne and set design at L’École des Arts Décoratifs de Paris. He has created designs for opera, concerts, theater performances and contemporary art exhibitions among other projects.

The company has developed projects for art galleries, urban spaces, parks, gardens and forests. These projects have tackled various topics often with irony. They use various types of techniques such as interviews, articles, poems, songs and word lists, along with actors, sound, lights, videos and movements. The works often contain references to literature, the sciences, the visual arts, music, cinema and comics. Vivarium Studio is part of the French avant-garde tradition which often focuses on mocking the ideas of the French bourgeoisie. Much of their work centers on characters who are in unusual to ridiculous situations but then turn the tables. Many of the works are focused on the little things in life. Although not obvious, Quesne also places political and social messages in his works, especially related to the environment. His views on the environment mostly show up in the stage design, as well as a series of picture books he created called Conséquences. Speech is kept to an absolute minimum, spectacle is decried and presence is considered to be most important. There is also conscious use of silence.

== Works created by the company ==
As an individual and director of Vivarium, Quesne has created and produced a number of works such as the multi-media piece, The Itching of the Wings (La Démangeaison des Ailes), Des Expériences (2004), an evolving project set in such diverse spaces as an art gallery, a forest, a pond, and a wasteland, D'après Nature (2006), L'Effet de Serge (2007), La Mélancolie des Dragons (2008), Echantillons (2008) and Big Bang (2010).

L'Effet de Serge is a drama performed on a very sparse set with no lavish dramatic gestures or abundant dialogue. The set is composed of empty walls, a ping-pong table, a snippet of a rug, a TV set, French doors opening onto a small garden. The work is about both the futility, pleasure and necessity of daily routines. Gaëtan Vourc'h played a Buster Keaton-like main character who prepares short shows for his friends in his living room on Saturday night. The goal is to show the need for the creative impulse which can be expressed in the simplest of deeds. This project was supported by Étant donnés: The French-American Fund for the Performing Arts, a program of FACE. L'Effet de Serge won an Obie Award at the Under the Radar Festival in New York City.

In La Mélancolie des Dragons, the scene focuses on a Citroën that houses six fans of Heavy metal music. The story revolves around their attempts to start their own version of a Disney theme park as a critique against cheap consumerism. In Echantillons, the stage consists mostly of a department store window, and spectators use an IMac mouse button to give commands to the actors behind the glass. The show BIG BANG is based on the theory of evolution, which, after a massive explosion, six people on a small island rewrite the history of the world.
