= Guillermo Velázquez =

Mexican musician from Xichú (born 1948)

Guillermo Velázquez (born 1948) is a Mexican musician from Xichú, best known for his folk music known as "arribeño huapango" and work with the Los Leones De La Sierra De Xichú. The rough guide to World music describes him as "probably the greatest living arribeño trovador". He is a noted organizer and contributor to festivals in Mexico.
