= Universidad de Guanajuato =

University in Mexico

University of Guanajuato
- Universidad de Guanajuato
- Motto: La Verdad Os Hará Libres (Spanish)
- Motto in English: The Truth Shall Make You Free
- Type: Public
- Established: 1732; 294 years ago
- Students: 47,108
- Location: Guanajuato, Guanajuato, Mexico; 21.017273°N 101.253098°W
- Colours: White, gold and blue
- Nickname: Bees
- Website: www.ugto.mx

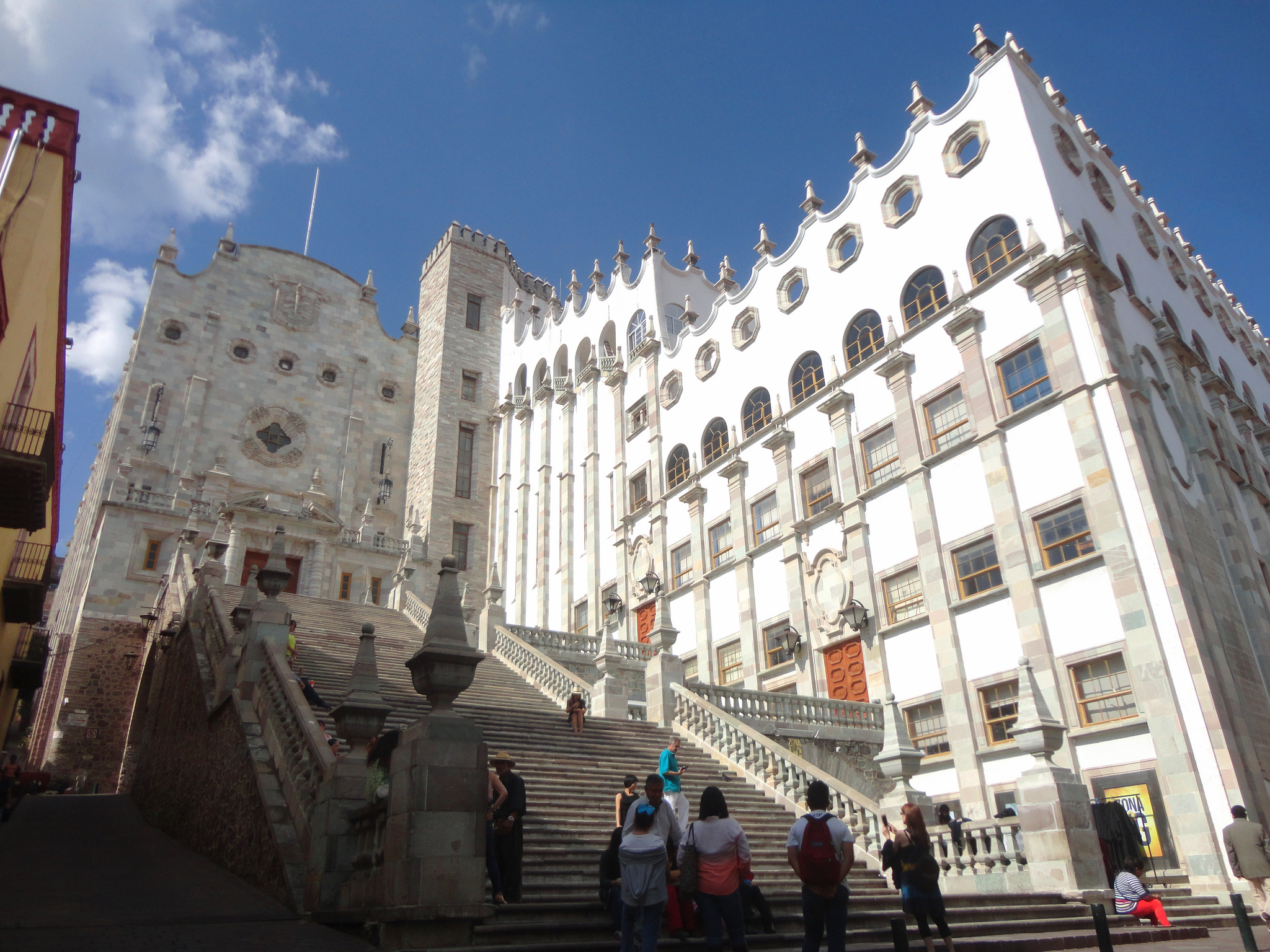
The University's main building in the historic center of Guanajuato City.

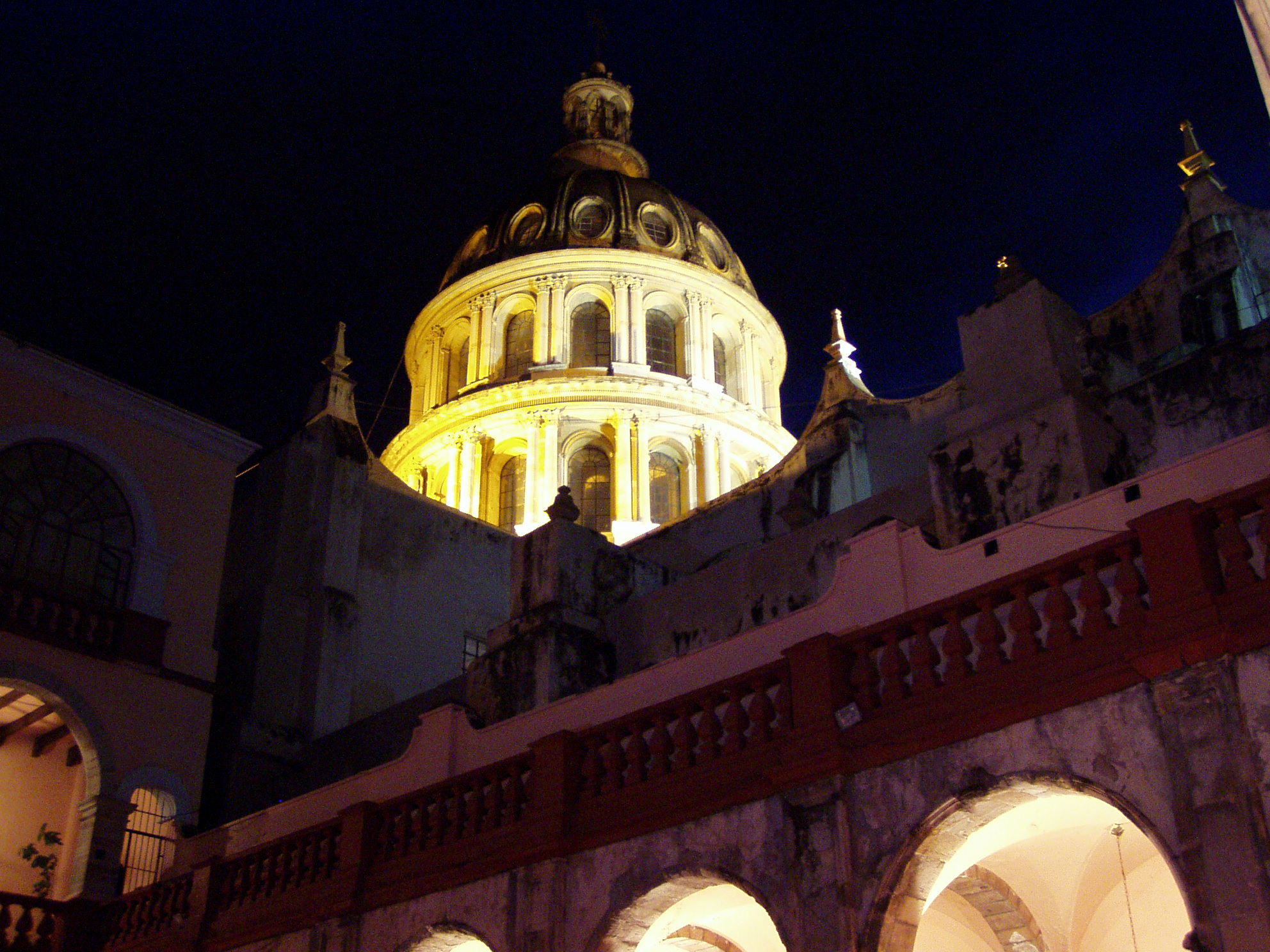
View of the Templo de la Compañía from the courtyard of the former Faculty of Industrial Relations

The Universidad de Guanajuato (in English, the University of Guanajuato) is a university based in the Mexican state of Guanajuato, made up of about 47,108 students in programs ranging from high school level to the doctorate level. Over 30,893 of those are pursuing undergraduate, masters, and doctorate degrees and 16,215 are in highschool. The university offers 215 academic programs, including 117 postgraduate programs, and 90 bachelor's degrees. The university has schools in fourteen cities throughout the state of Guanajuato.

== History ==
The university traces its history back to the educational institute called the Hospice of the Holy Trinity, which was established on October 1, 1732. On August 29, 1827, upon the signing of the first constitutional government, the school changed its name to the College of the Immaculate Conception and fell under government responsibility. Programs founded around this time included Mining, Law, Painting, Sculpture and Architecture. In 1831, a library was established.

The name of the college changed again in 1867, this time to the National College of Guanajuato. During the following decade, technical programs at the school grew rapidly, as did research. Finally, in 1945, the college changed its name to the University of Guanajuato, and the school was granted autonomy by the state legislature beginning on May 21, 1994.

== Mission ==
Increase, preserve and share all knowledge aimed towards the upright development of the human being, through the preservation of its environment and the construction of a democratic, just and free society.

== Vision ==
The University of Guanajuato is a public institution offering high school and university education.

== Academic structure ==
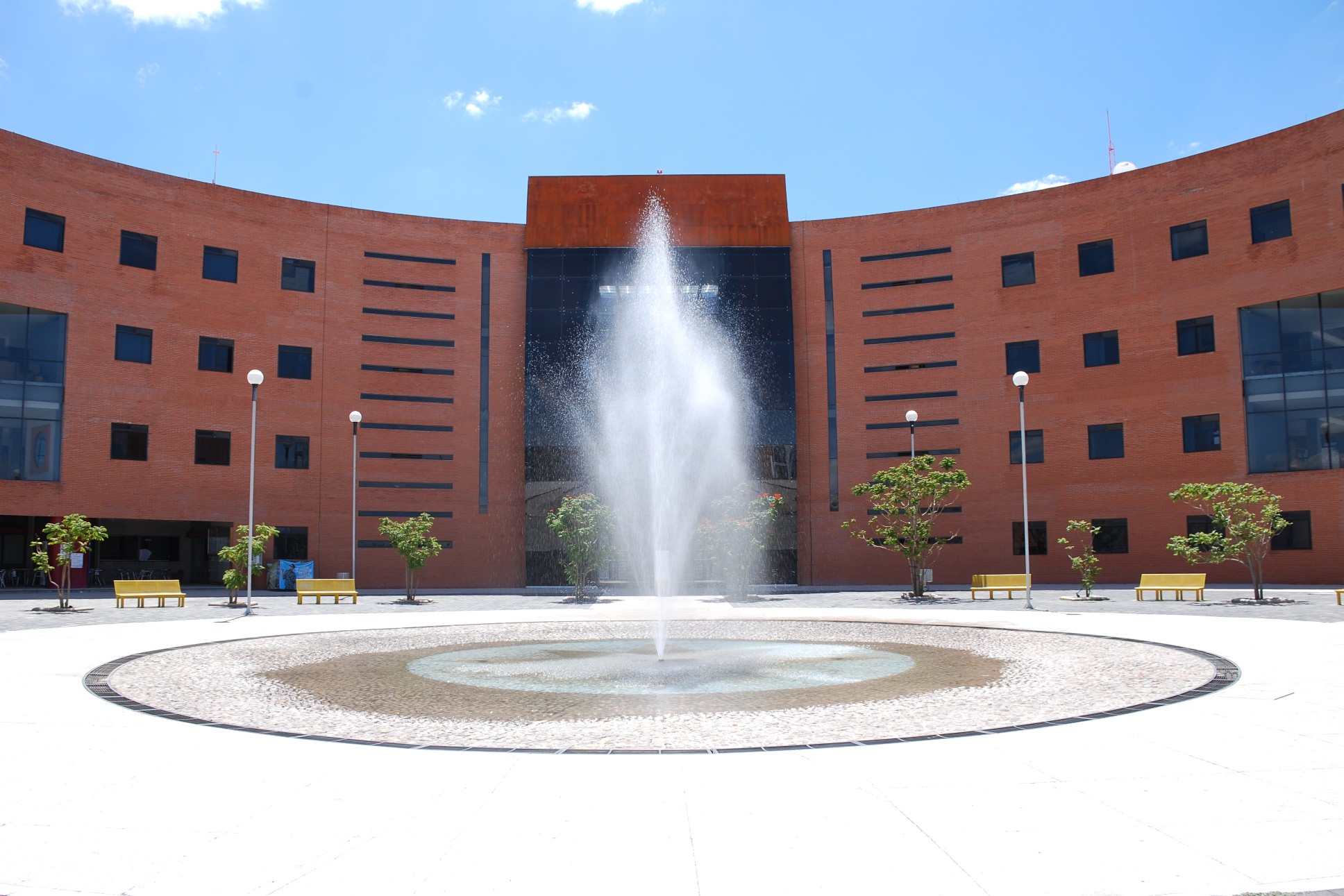
Campus DCEA, Guanajuato.

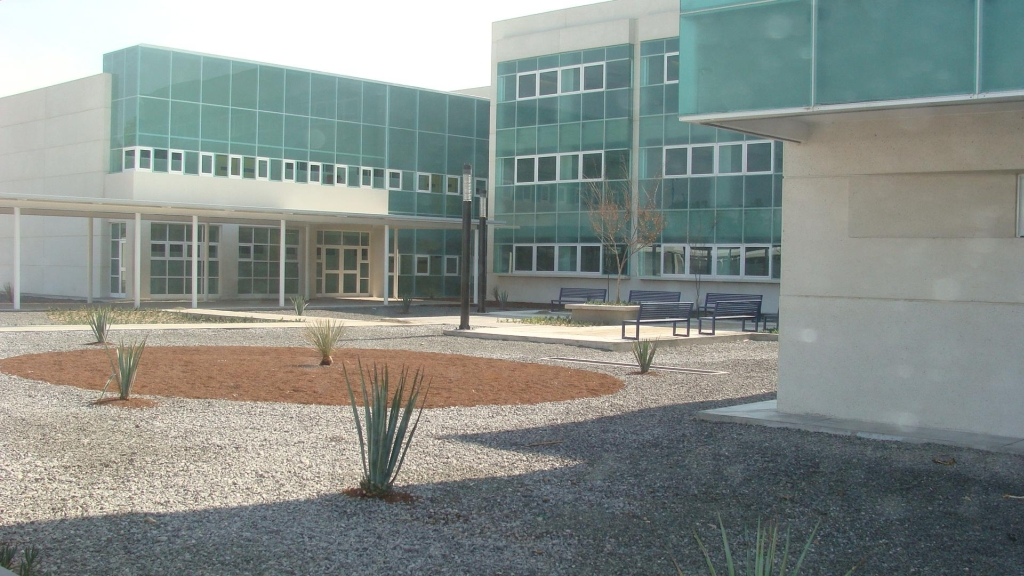
Campus Celaya-Salvatierra

Campus Celaya-Salvatierra

1. Division of Health Sciences and Engineering
2. Division of Social and Administrative Sciences

Campus Guanajuato

1. Division of Architecture, Art and Design
2. Division of Economic-Administrative Sciences
3. Division of Natural and Exact Sciences
4. Division of Social Sciences and Humanities
5. Division of Law, Politics and Government
6. Division of Engineering

Campus Irapuato-Salamanca

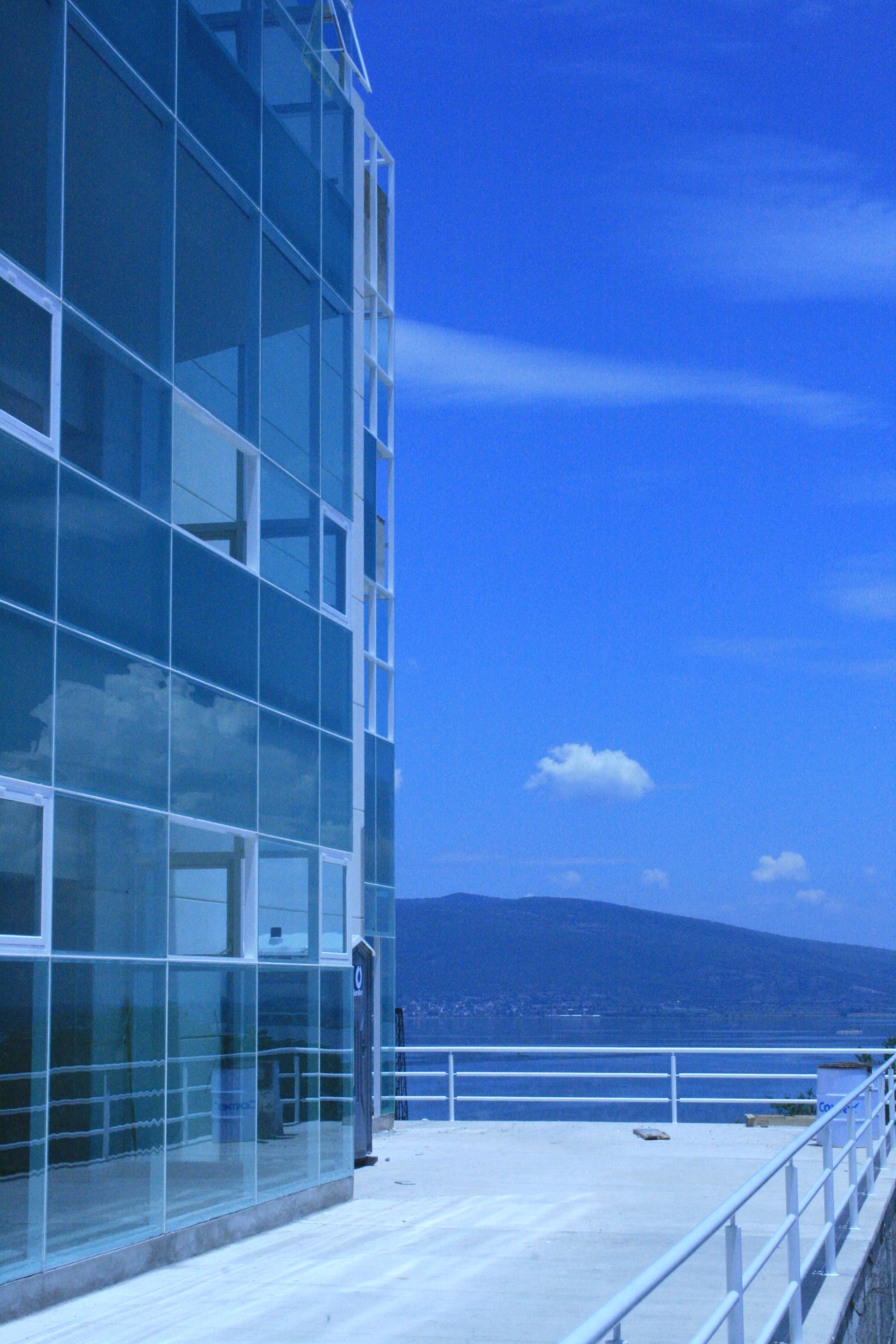
Yuriria

1. Division of Life Sciences
2. Division of Engineering

Campus León

1. Division of Sciences and Engineering
2. Division of Health Sciences
3. Division of Social Sciences and Humanities

High School System

1. Escuela de NIvel Medio Superior de Celaya
2. Escuela de NIvel Medio Superior de Guanajuato
3. Escuela de NIvel Medio Superior de Irapuato
4. Escuela de NIvel Medio Superior de León
5. Escuela de NIvel Medio Superior Centro Histórico de León
6. Escuela de NIvel Medio Superior de Pénjamo
7. Escuela de NIvel Medio Superior de Salamanca
8. Escuela de NIvel Medio Superior de Salvatierra
9. Escuela de NIvel Medio Superior de San Luis de la Paz
10. Escuela de NIvel Medio Superior de Silao

== See also ==
- List of Jesuit sites
