= San Miguel Arcángel Fountain =

San Miguel Arcángel Fountain may refer to:

- San Miguel Arcángel Fountain (Cholula)
- San Miguel Arcángel Fountain (Puebla)
