= Statue of Miguel Hidalgo y Costilla =

The statue of Miguel Hidalgo y Costilla may refer to:

- Statue of Miguel Hidalgo y Costilla, Cholula, Puebla, Mexico
- Statue of Miguel Hidalgo y Costilla, Guadalajara, Jalisco, Mexico
