= Banner of the Virgin of Guadalupe =

First national flag of Mexico

The Banner of the Virgin of Guadalupe or the popular name for the Hidalgo's Banner is a piece from the National Museum of History of Mexico (MNH). It consists of a piece of cloth painted in oil with the image of Our Lady of Guadalupe, on each side of which there are two shields, signs and, at the bottom, flowers painted with the same technique, and is characterized by two additional triangles at the bottom. This is just one of the many coats of arms that were captured from the insurgent forces at the beginning of the War of Independence.

The officially known as the Standard of Hidalgo is popularly identified as the Painting of Hidalgo and is made up of an oil painting of Our Lady of Guadalupe without other decorations, framed and mounted on a wooden pedestal kept in the same National Museum of History, this painting is signed by the New Spanish painter, Andrés López, who made it in 1805 as part of an experiment proposed by the bachelor Bartolache in the mid-eighteenth century, and whose purpose was to verify if human hand could have painted an ayate as occurred with the original, clearing any doubt about its divine origin, a situation that was confirmed by the authorities of the time without any word against it, so this painting is considered one of the few touched reproductions of the Tilma of Tepeyac.

== History ==
The history of both banners is at least confusing since both have been popularly identified with the same word, Hidalgo's Banner, but in general of their history it can be said:

The Banner or Painting of Hidalgo was identified after a study by the researcher of the National Institute of Anthropology and History (INAH), Jacinto Barrera Bassols as a work of the painter and faculty member of the Academy of San Carlos, Andrés López in 1805 for the so-called experiment of the bachelor Bartolache who in the mid-eighteenth century proposed to allow any prestigious painter who requested it to copy the Image of the Tilma of Tepeyac to demonstrate that not even the most skilled human hand could make a work of equal quality, so it had to be a divine work, obviously for the jury of the time none of the painters managed to match the original work, each of those copies was called from then on "Touched".

Of what happened later with that Touched copy we have a vague idea, but on September 16, 1810, This was framed in the sacristy of the parish of Atotonilco in San Miguel de Allende, Guanajuato, where the leaders of the nascent armed movement met for a few hours. When they left, after an argument about which flag to use, at that time the regular troops commanded by Allende and Aldama were already carrying the so-called Twin Flags of Allende. The painting was torn down by a rancher who was among Miguel Hidalgo's troops. The rancher then tied it to a simple clothesline pole from the same parish and literally threw it to Miguel Hidalgo and Ignacio Allende to raise it in front of the troops.

== See also ==
- Miguel Hidalgo y Costilla
- List of Mexican flags
