= Statue of Miguel Hidalgo y Costilla, Cholula =

Statue in Cholula, Puebla, Mexico

Statue of Miguel Hidalgo y Costilla
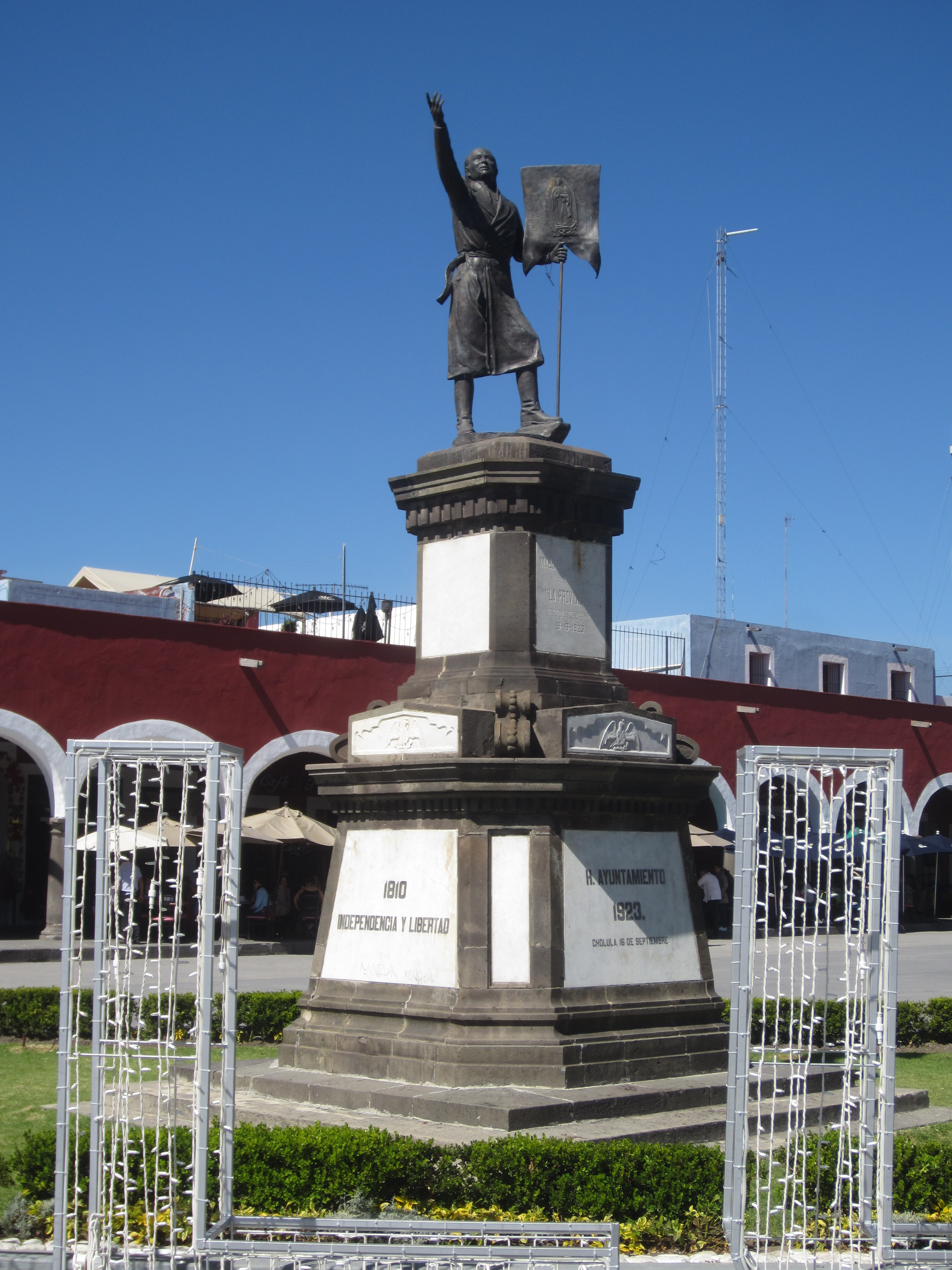
- The memorial in 2018
- Subject: Miguel Hidalgo y Costilla
- Location: Cholula, Puebla, Mexico; 19°3′44.7″N 98°18′25.7″W

The statue of Miguel Hidalgo y Costilla is installed in Cholula, Puebla's Plaza de la Concordia, in Mexico.
