= Plaza de la Concordia =

Plaza in Cholula, Puebla, Mexico

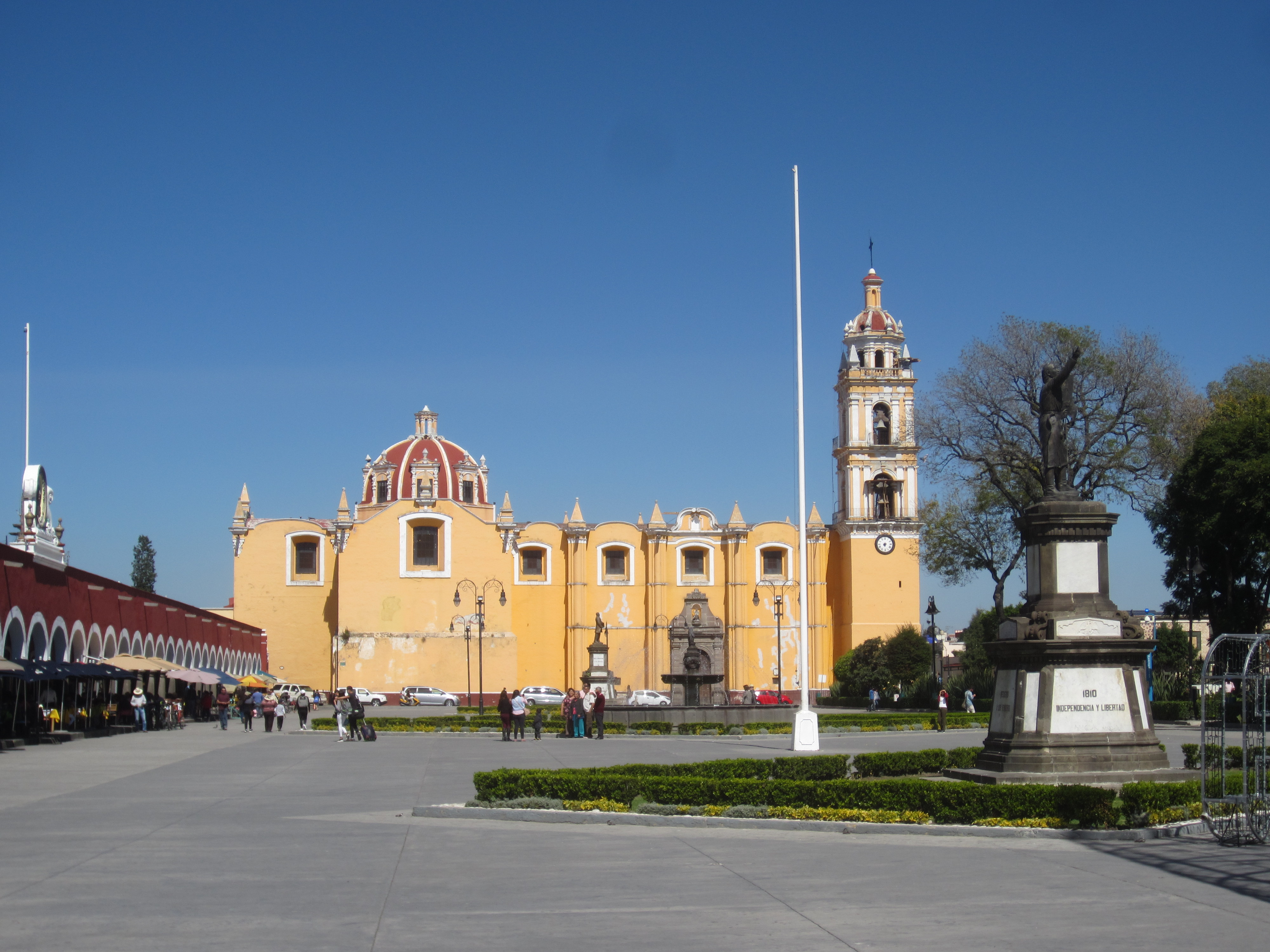

- Location within Mexico
- Location: Cholula, Puebla, Mexico
- Coordinates: 19°3′46″N 98°18′25″W

The Plaza de la Concordia, or Zócalo, is a large plaza in Cholula, Puebla, Mexico.

== Features ==
The San Miguel Arcángel Fountain, statue of Benito Juárez, and statue of Miguel Hidalgo y Costilla are installed in the plaza.
