= Miguel Hidalgo y Costilla =

Mexican Catholic preacher (1753–1811)

The Reverend Don Miguel Hidalgo y Costilla
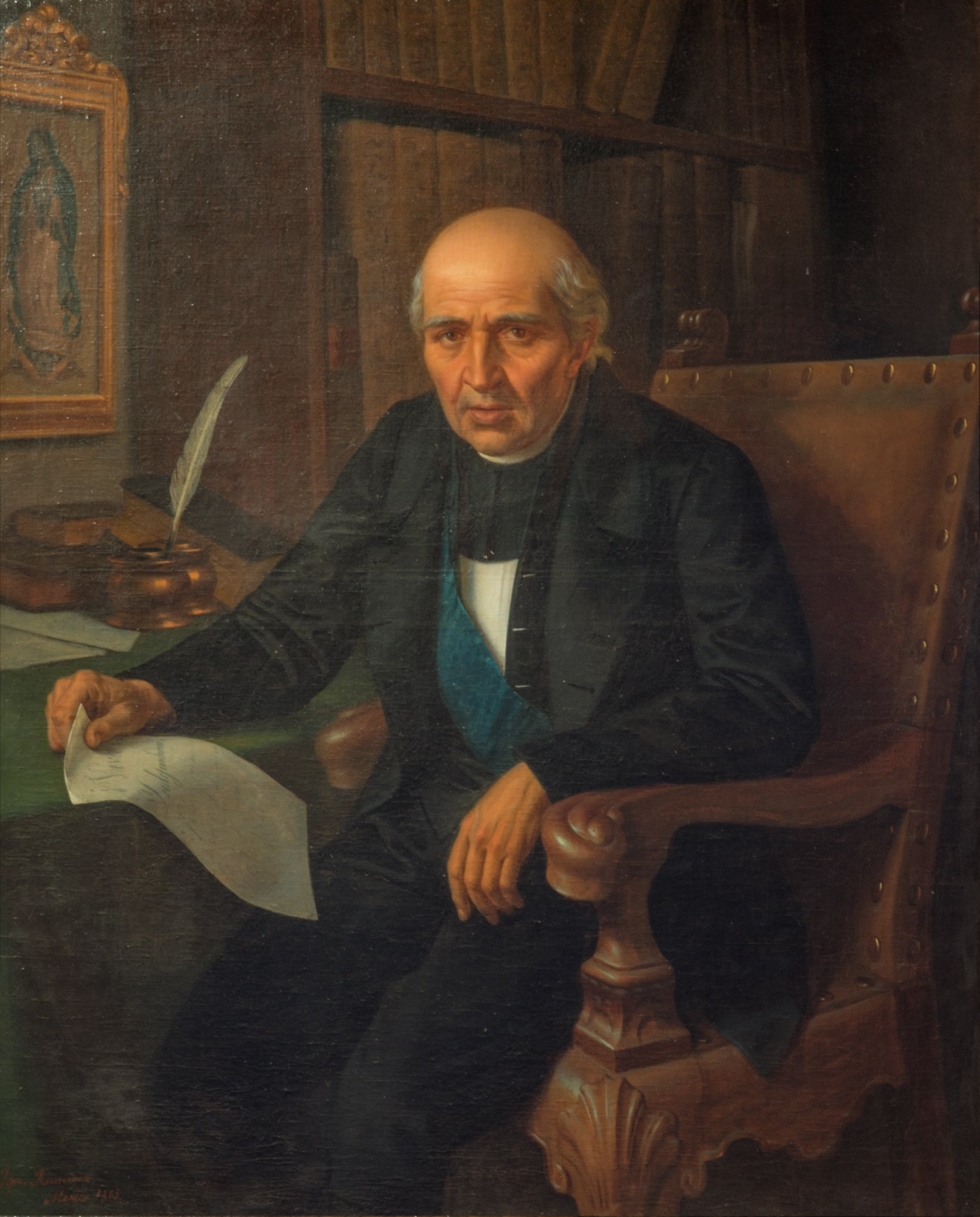
- Portrait by Joaquín Ramírez, 1865
- Born: Miguel Gregorio Antonio Ignacio Hidalgo y Costilla Gallaga Mandarte y Villaseñor; 8 May 1753; Pénjamo, Nueva Galicia, Viceroyalty of New Spain
- Died: 30 July 1811 (aged 58); Chihuahua, Nueva Vizcaya, Viceroyalty of New Spain
- Cause of death: Execution by firing squad
- Burial place: Ángel de la Independencia, Mexico City
- Military career
- Allegiance: Mexico
- Branch: Mexican Insurgency
- Service years: 1810–1811
- Rank: Generalissimo
- Conflicts: Mexican War of Independence

Don Miguel Gregorio Antonio Ignacio Hidalgo y Costilla Gallaga Mandarte y Villaseñor (8 May 1753 – 30 July 1811), commonly known as Miguel Hidalgo y Costilla or simply Miguel Hidalgo (Spanish: [miˈɣel iˈðalɣo]), was a Mexican Catholic priest, teacher and leader of the early phase of the Mexican War of Independence. He is widely recognized as the Father of the Nation for issuing the Grito de Dolores on 16 September 1810, which initiated the armed struggle against Spanish colonial rule.

A professor at the Colegio de San Nicolás Obispo in Valladolid, Hidalgo was influenced by Enlightenment ideas, which contributed to his ouster in 1792. He served in a church in Colima and then in Dolores where he promoted practical economic improvements for local indigenous and mestizo communities.

On the night of 15–16 September 1810, following the discovery of the Conspiracy of Querétaro, he rang the parish church bells and called the population to arms. The exact wording of his call to arms is unknown; contemporary and later accounts vary, and there is no scholarly consensus on the precise initial goals of the conspirators. Modern Mexican historiography distinguishes between Hidalgo’s perceived preference for absolute independence and the more autonomist leanings of figures such as Ignacio Allende.

Hidalgo rapidly assembled a large, poorly disciplined popular army that scored early successes in the Bajío. He headed a provincial government in Guadalajara from where he issued various decrees before suffering a decisive defeat at the Battle of Calderón Bridge in January 1811. While fleeing north, he was captured, tried, defrocked, and executed by firing squad in Chihuahua on 30 July 1811. His short leadership phase radicalized the independence movement and opened the way for subsequent leaders such as his former student José María Morelos.

== Early years ==
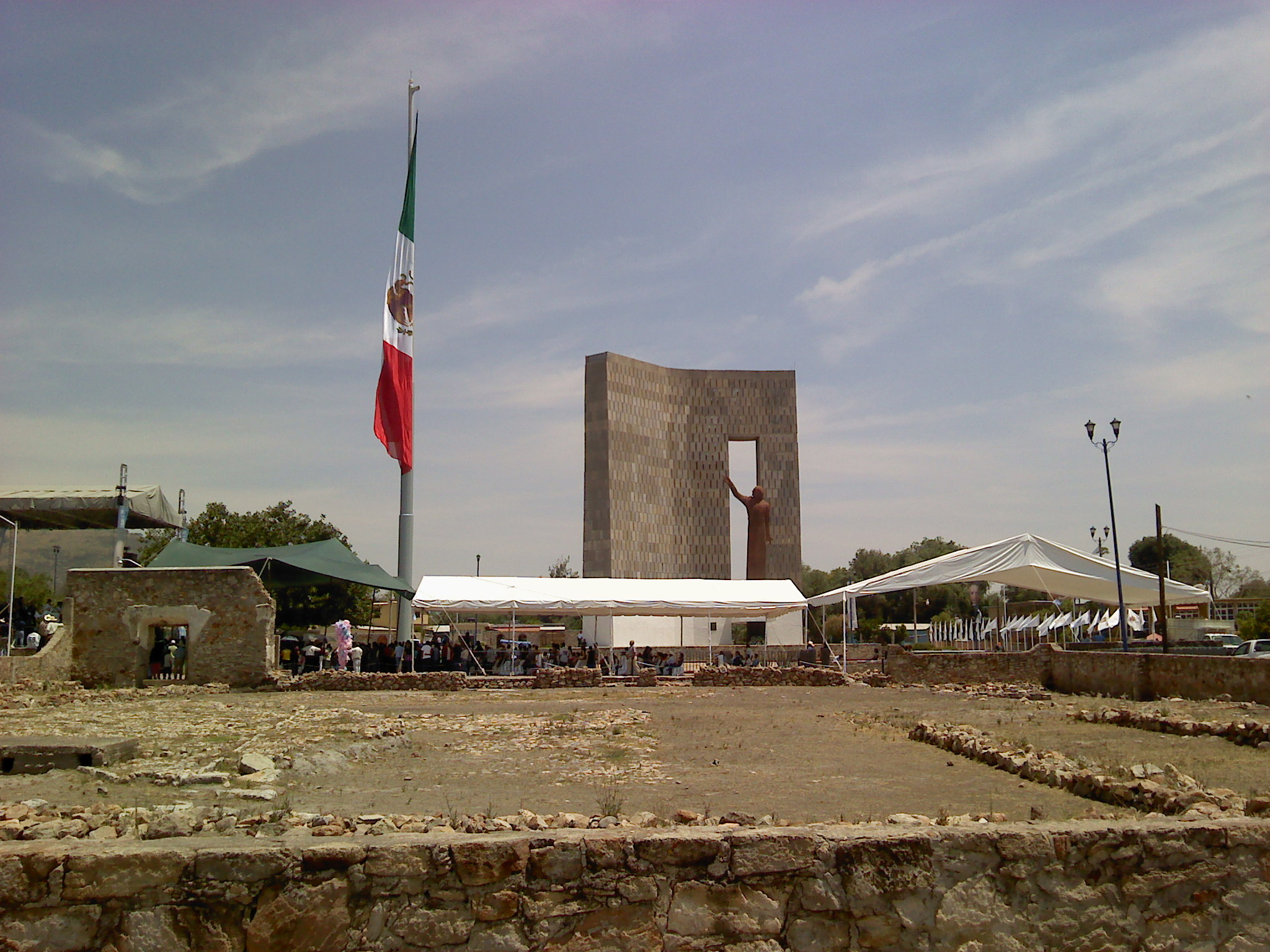
Corralejo, Pénjamo, Guanajuato, where Hidalgo was born

Hidalgo was the second-born child of Cristóbal Hidalgo y Costilla Espinoza de los Monteros and Ana María Gallaga Mandarte Villaseñor, both criollos. On his maternal side, he was of Basque ancestry. His most recent identifiable Spanish ancestor was his maternal great-grandfather, who was from Durango, Biscay. On his paternal side, he descended from criollo families native to Tejupilco, which were well-respected within the criollo community. Hidalgo's father was an hacienda manager in Valladolid, Michoacán, where Hidalgo spent the majority of his life. Eight days after his birth, Hidalgo was baptized into the Catholic faith in the parish church of Cuitzeo de los Naranjos. Hidalgo's parents had three other sons; José Joaquín, Manuel Mariano, and José María, before their mother died when Hildalgo was nine years old. A half-brother named Mariano was born later.

In 1759, Charles III ascended the Spanish throne; he soon sent out a visitor-general with the power to investigate and reform all parts of colonial government. During this period, Cristóbal was determined that Miguel and his younger brother Joaquín should both enter the priesthood and hierarchy of the Catholic Church. Being of significant means he paid for all of his sons to receive the best education the region had to offer. After receiving private instruction, likely from the priest of the neighboring parish, Hidalgo was ready for further education.

== Education, ordination, and early career ==
At the age of twelve Hidalgo was sent to Valladolid (now Morelia), Michoacán, to study at the Colegio de San Francisco Javier with the Jesuits, along with his brothers. When the Jesuits were expelled from Mexico in 1767, he entered the Colegio de San Nicolás, where he studied for the priesthood.

He completed his preparatory education in 1770. After this, he went to the Royal and Pontifical University of Mexico in Mexico City for further study, earning his degree in philosophy and theology in 1773. His education for the priesthood was traditional, with subjects in Latin, rhetoric and logic. Like many priests in Mexico, he studied indigenous languages, such as Nahuatl, Otomi, and Purépecha. He also studied Italian and French, which were not commonly studied in Mexico at this time. He earned the nickname "El Zorro" ("The Fox") for his reputation for cleverness at school. Hidalgo's study of French allowed him to read and study works of the Enlightenment current in Europe but, at the same time, forbidden by the Catholic church in Mexico.

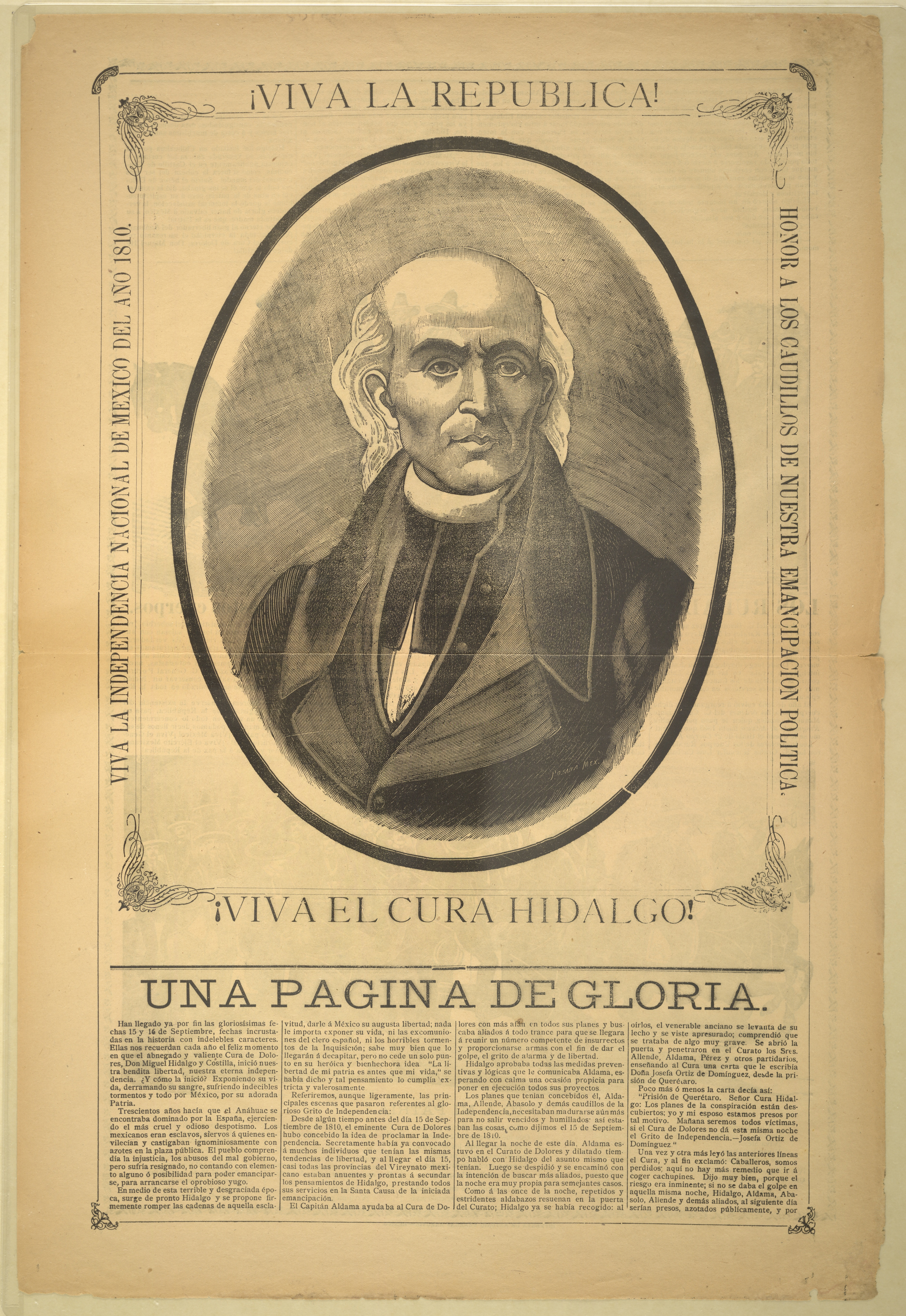
Etching depicting Hidalgo's portrait, on a pamphlet celebrating Mexican independence

Hidalgo was ordained as a priest in 1778 when he was 25 years old. From 1779 to 1792, he dedicated himself to teaching at the Colegio de San Nicolás Obispo in Valladolid (now Morelia); it was "one of the most important educational centers of the viceroyalty." He was a professor of Latin grammar and arts, as well as a theology professor. Beginning in 1787, he was named treasurer, vice-rector and secretary, becoming dean of the school in 1790 when he was 37. As rector, Hidalgo continued studying the liberal ideas that were coming from France and other parts of Europe. Authorities ousted him in 1792 for revising traditional teaching methods there, but also for "irregular handling of some funds." The Church sent him to work at the parishes of Colima and San Felipe Torres Mochas until he became the parish priest in Dolores, Guanajuato, succeeding his brother José Joaquín a few weeks after his death on 19 September 1802.

Although Hidalgo had a traditional education for the priesthood, as an educator at the Colegio de San Nicolás he had innovated in teaching methods and curriculum. In his personal life, he did not advocate or live the way expected of 18th-century Mexican priests. Instead, his studies of Enlightenment-era ideas caused him to challenge traditional political and religious views. He questioned the absolute authority of the Spanish king and challenged numerous ideas presented by the Church, including the power of the popes, the virgin birth, and clerical celibacy. As a secular cleric, he was not bound by a vow of poverty, so he, like many other secular priests, pursued business activities, including owning three haciendas; but contrary to his vow of chastity, he formed liaisons with women. One was with Manuela Ramos Pichardo, with whom he had two children, as well as a child with Bibiana Lucero. He later lived with a woman named María Manuela Herrera, fathering two daughters out of wedlock with her, and later fathered three other children with a woman named Josefa Quintana.

These actions resulted in his appearance before the Court of the Inquisition, although the court did not find him guilty. Hidalgo was an egalitarian. As parish priest in both San Felipe and Dolores, he opened his house to natives and mestizos as well as criollos.

== Background to the War of Independence ==
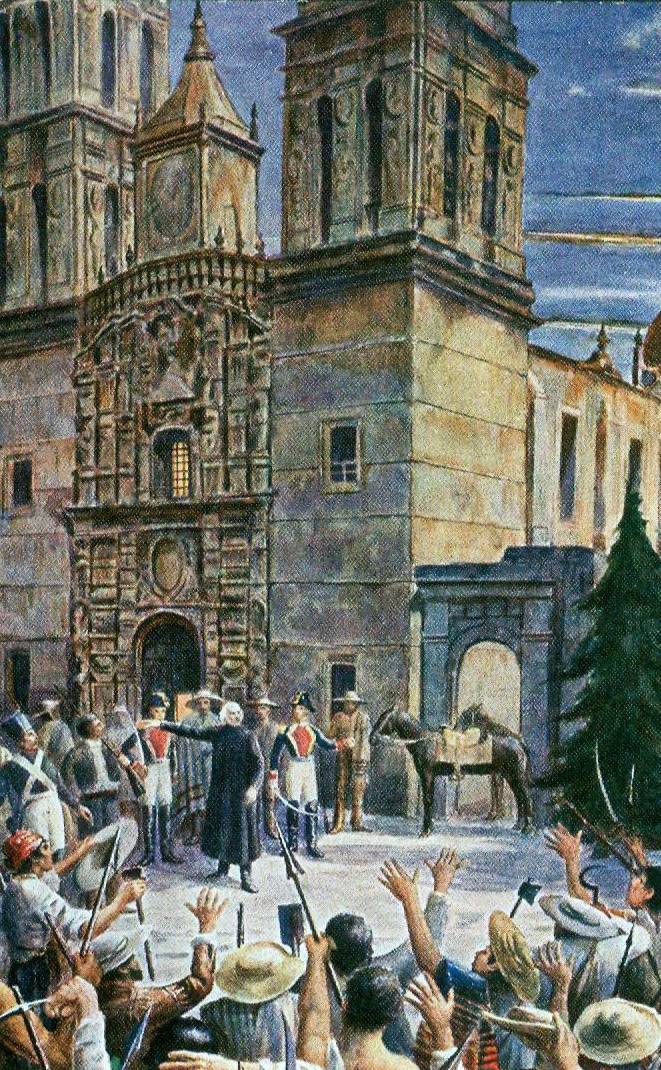
Miguel Hidalgo proclaimed national independence in Dolores

=== The conspiracy of Querétaro ===
Meanwhile, in the city of Querétaro, a conspiracy was brewing, organized by the mayor Miguel Domínguez and his wife Josefa Ortiz de Domínguez; members of the military, such as Ignacio Allende, Juan Aldama and Mariano Abasolo, also participated. Allende was in charge of convincing Hidalgo to join his movement, since the priest of Dolores had very influential friends from all over the Bajío and even New Spain, such as Juan Antonio Riaño, mayor of Guanajuato, and Manuel Abad y Queipo, Bishop of Michoacán.

=== Napoleonic Wars ===
In 1807, France and Spain signed the Treaty of Fontainebleau to invade Portugal, an ally of the United Kingdom. The French troops that were supposed to go through Spain to Portugal remained in Spain and the Spanish people were upset by the presence of the French troops as a result of the numerous excesses that the French committed against the Spanish people, such as occupation of the territory, frequent looting, pillaging, murder of civilians, and the kidnappings of King Charles IV and Prince Ferdinand VII. Also, Napoleon forced both to abdicate and installed his brother, Joseph Bonaparte, as King of Spain. This triggered a revolt by Spanish troops first and, subsequently, an uprising in Madrid, This was followed by further revolts across Spain. In August 1808, a British army landed in Portugal. Britain and France then went to war against each other in Portugal and Spain. The war and instability in Spain affected Mexico and other parts of New Spain.

== Parish priest in Dolores ==
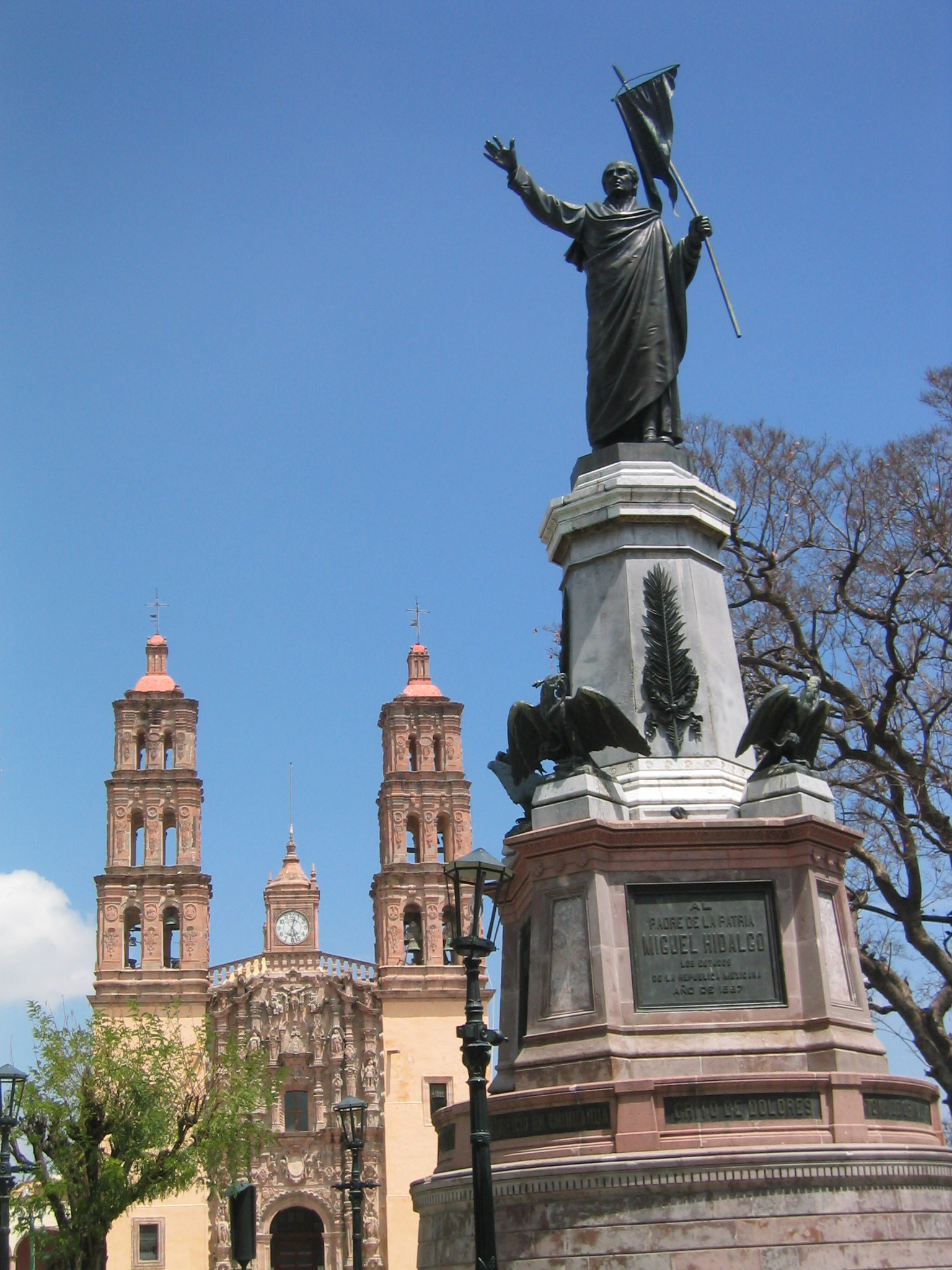
Statue of Hidalgo in front of his church at Dolores Hidalgo, Guanajuato

In 1803, aged 50, Hidalgo arrived in Dolores accompanied by his family that included a younger brother, a cousin, two half sisters, as well as María and their two children. He obtained this parish in spite of his hearing before the Inquisition, which did not stop his secular practices.

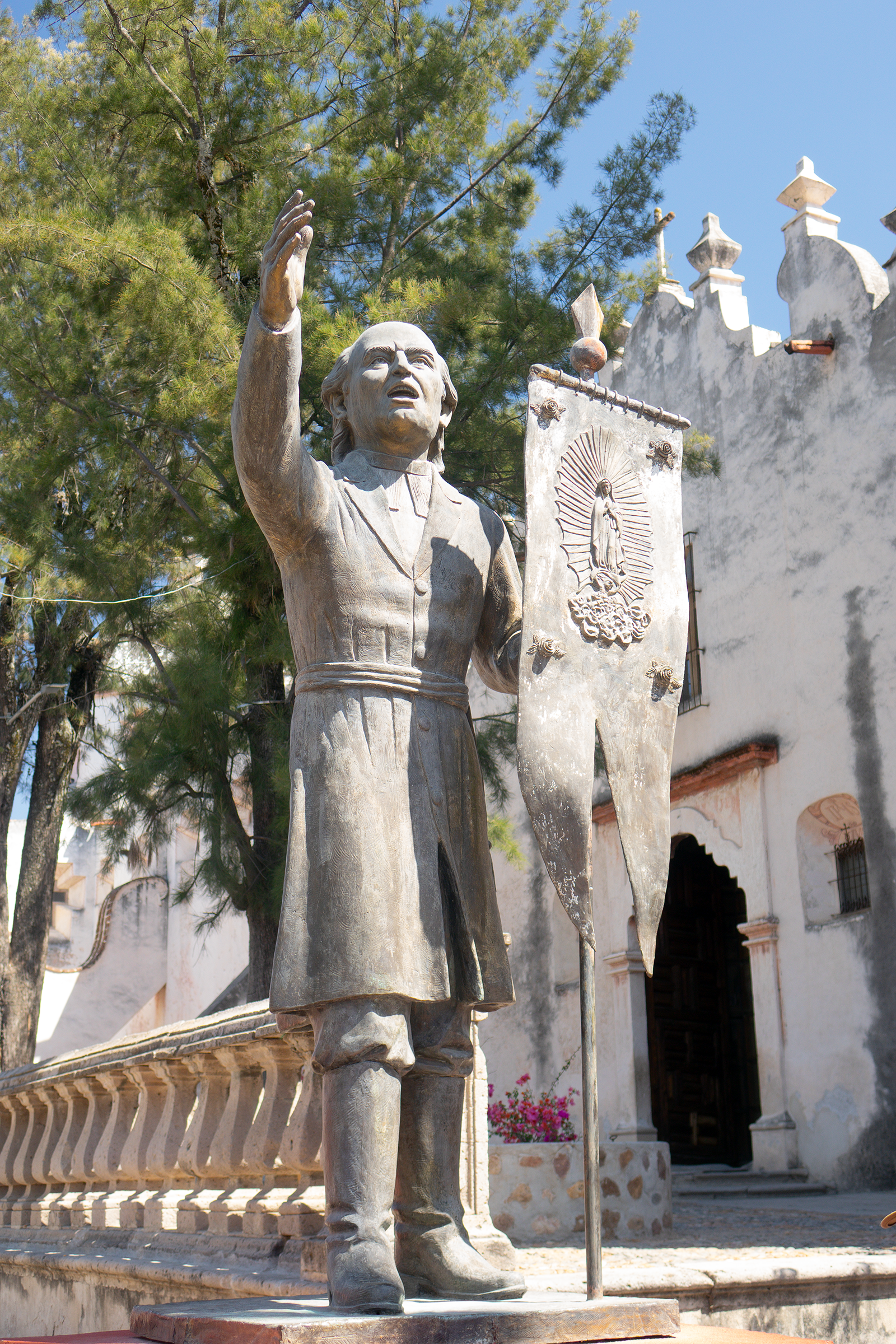
Hidalgo, statue at the Sanctuary in Atotonilco

After Hidalgo settled in Dolores, he turned over most of the clerical duties to one of his vicars, Francisco Iglesias, and devoted himself almost exclusively to commerce, intellectual pursuits and humanitarian activities. He spent much of his time studying literature, scientific works, grape cultivation, and the raising of silkworms. He used the knowledge that he gained to promote economic activities for the poor and rural people in his area. He established factories to make bricks and pottery and trained indigenous people in the making of leather. He promoted beekeeping. He was interested in promoting activities of commercial value to use the natural resources of the area to help the poor. His goal was to make the indigenous and mestizos more self-reliant. However, these activities violated mercantilist policies designed to protect agriculture and industry in Spain, and Hidalgo was ordered to stop them. These policies as well as exploitation of mixed race castas fostered animosity in Hidalgo towards the Peninsular-born Spaniards in Mexico.

In addition to restricting economic activities in New Spain, Spanish mercantile practices caused misery for native peoples. A drought in 1807–1808 caused a famine in the Dolores area, and rather than releasing stored grain to market, Spanish merchants blocked its release, speculating on price increases. Hidalgo lobbied against these practices but was not successful.

== Cry of Dolores ==
Hidalgo kickstarted Mexico's battle for independence on 16 September 1810. Hidalgo, like many in the movement, grew increasingly violent as resentment grew. Hidalgo quickly rose to prominence as a leader, being a respected member of the community with his educated background. While Hidalgo did lead the rebellion, independence was not the primary interest for him; he rather sought to support the well-being of parishioners. Hidalgo was able to temporarily unite multiple social groups under his rule against the Spanish monarchy.

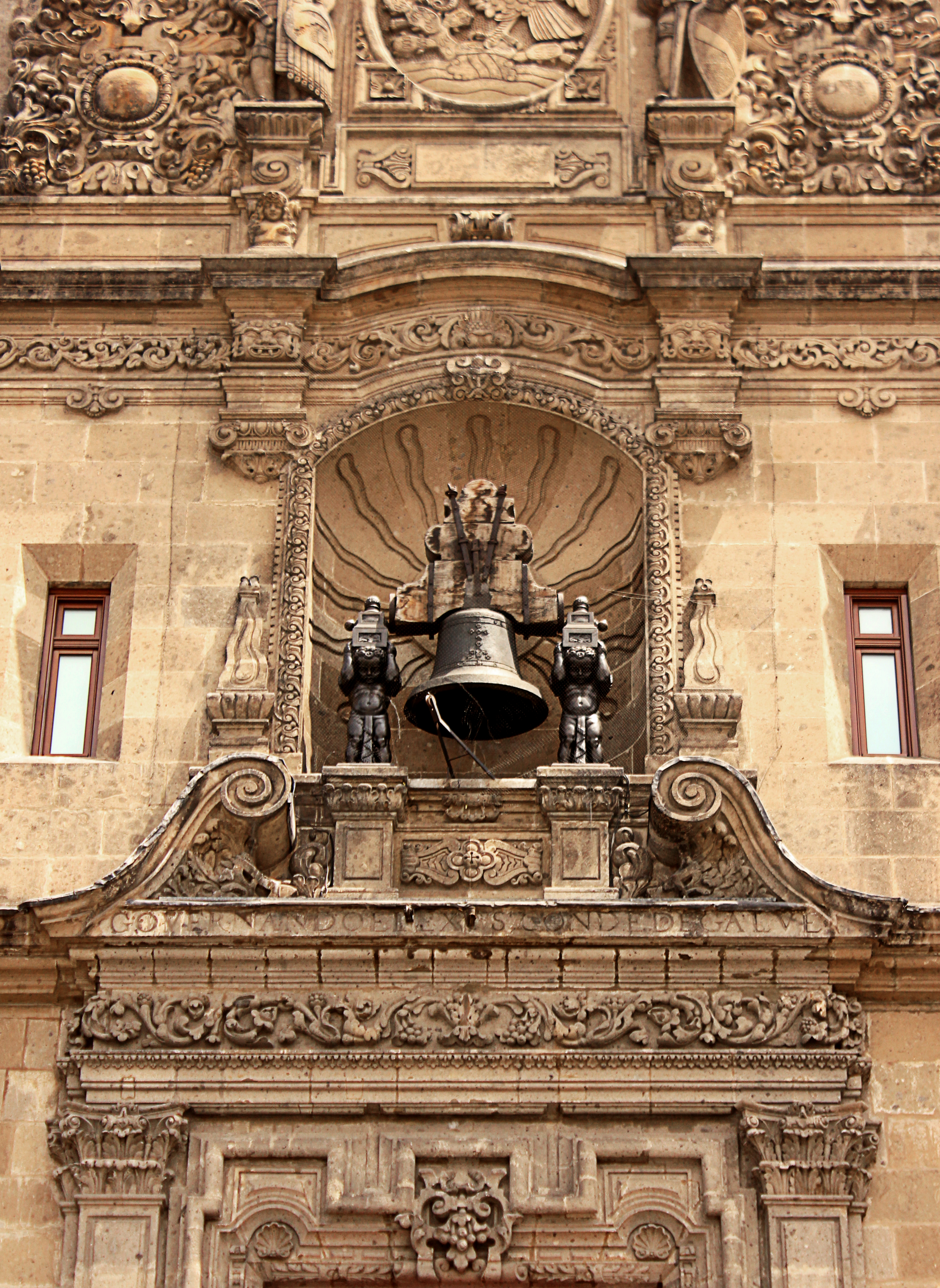
The Bell of Dolores was moved from the church to Mexico's National Palace after Hidalgo's death and is rung each year on independence day by the president

He led an army of around 40,000 peasants, which came close to capturing Mexico City, though the revolt was ultimately suppressed. Hidalgo's uprising covered large areas of the Mexican Bajío and required significant repression after his death in 1811, paving the way for his successor José María Morelos. The scale and social composition of Hidalgo's army demonstrated the intensity of warfare in the Americas during the independence wars, comparable to contemporary European conflicts, and contributed to the increasing militarization of Mexican society.

As the rebellion grew the more Hidalgo threatened the Spanish Monarchy making Hidalgo act more cautiously. Fearing arrest, Hidalgo ordered his brother Mauricio, as well as Ignacio Allende and Mariano Abasolo, to go with a number of other armed men to make the sheriff release prison inmates in Dolores on the night of 15 September 1810, setting eighty free. On the morning of 16 September 1810 Hidalgo addressed a gathering in front of the parish church in what became known as the Grito de Dolores.

The precise words are unknown. The closest participant accounts are those of Pedro García, who joined the movement that day, and of Juan Aldama, who stood next to Hidalgo and later gave a judicial declaration. García recalled Hidalgo declaring that neither the king nor the tribute system existed for them any longer, that the moment of emancipation had arrived, and that they would fight for America. Aldama’s declaration, recorded in 1811, gives a shorter version centered on “¡Viva América!, ¡viva la religión y muera el mal gobierno!” Neither account includes an appeal to Ferdinand VII.

The formula “¡Viva Fernando VII! Muera el mal gobierno” appears in later reconstructions, most influentially that of Lucas Alamán in 1849. Modern Mexican historians such as Carlos Herrejón treat the participant testimonies as more consistent with Hidalgo’s own preference for absolute independence than with the Ferdinand align reading that Alamán and other conservative writers later popularized.

== Hidalgo's army – from Celaya to Monte de las Cruces ==
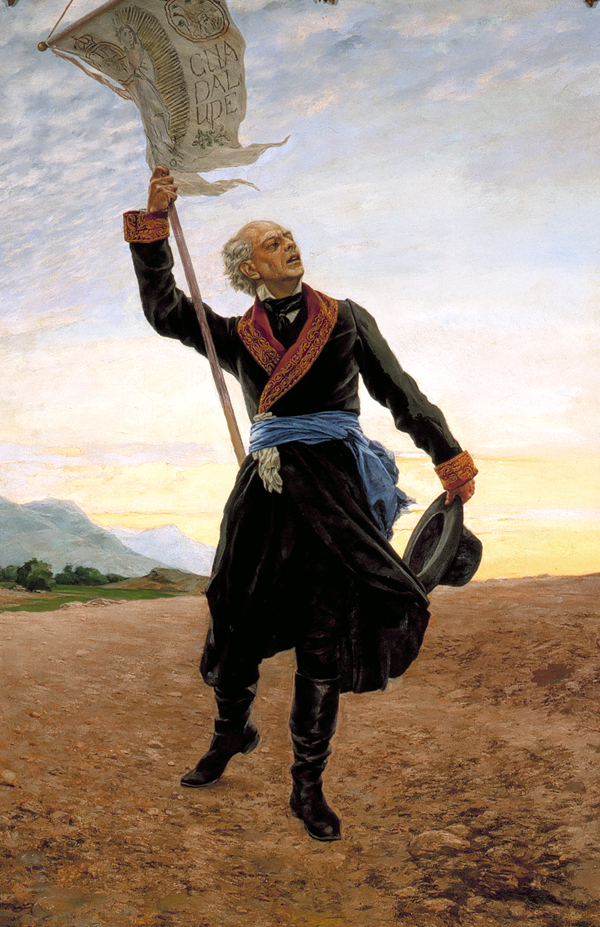
Hidalgo, as the "father of Mexico", carrying his banner with the image of Our Lady of Guadalupe (a 1905 painting by Antonio Fabrés)

Hidalgo was met with an outpouring of support. Intellectuals, liberal priests and many poor people followed Hidalgo with enthusiasm. His movement was joined by mestizos and the indigenous in such numbers that the original motives of the Querétaro group were obscured. Ignacio Allende, Hidalgo's main co-conspirator in Querétaro, remained more loyal to the Querétaro group's original, criollo centered objectives. However, Hidalgo's actions and the people's response meant he would lead and not Allende. Allende had acquired military training when New Spain established a colonial militia whereas Hidalgo had none. The insurgents who followed Hidalgo also had no military training, experience or equipment. Many of these people were poor who were angry after many years of hunger and oppression. Consequently, Hidalgo was the leader of undisciplined rebels.

Hidalgo's leadership gave the insurgent movement a supernatural aspect. Many villagers that joined the insurgent army came to believe that Ferdinand VII himself commanded their loyalty to Hidalgo and the monarch was in New Spain personally directing the rebellion against the Viceroyalty. Historian Eric Van Young believes that such ideas gave the movement supernatural and religious legitimacy that went as far as messianic expectation.

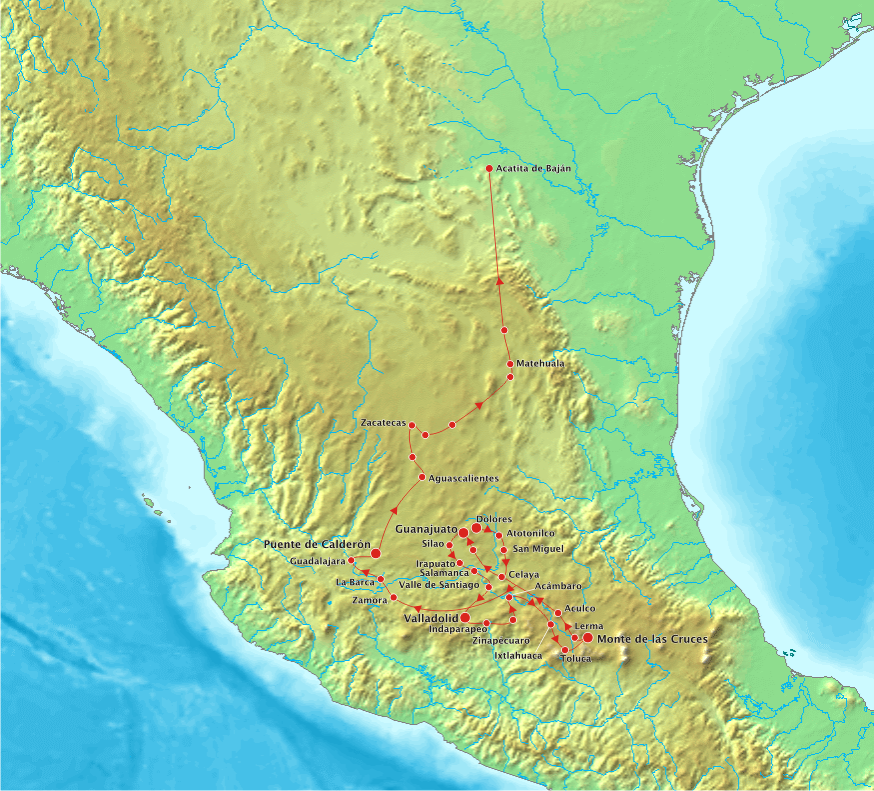
Map of Hidalgo's campaign

Hidalgo and Allende left Dolores with about 800 men, half of whom were on horseback. They marched through the Bajío area, through Atotonilco, San Miguel el Grande (present-day San Miguel de Allende), Chamucuero, Celaya, Salamanca, Irapuato and Silao, to Guanajuato. From Guanajuato, Hidalgo directed his troops to Valladolid, Michoacán. They remained here for a while and eventually marched towards Mexico City. From Valladolid, they marched through the State of Mexico, through the cities of Maravatio, Ixtlahuaca, Toluca coming as close to Mexico City as the Monte de las Cruces, between the Valley of Toluca and the Valley of Mexico.

Through numbers, Hidalgo's army had some early victories. Hidalgo first went through the economically important and densely populated province of Guanajuato. One of the first stops was at the Sanctuary of Nuestra Señora de Guadalupe in Atotonilco, where Hidalgo affixed an image of the Virgin of Guadalupe to a lance to adopt it as his banner. He inscribed the following slogans to his troops' flags: "Long live religion! Long live our most Holy Mother of Guadalupe! Long live America and death to bad government!" For the insurgents as a whole, the Virgin represented an intense and highly localized religious sensibility, invoked more to identify allies rather than create ideological alliances or a sense of nationalism.

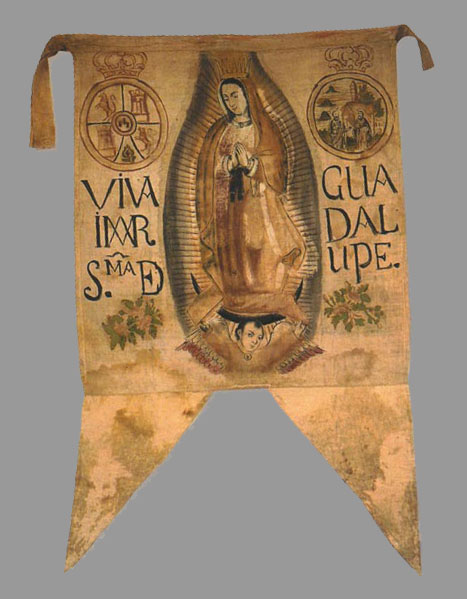
Banner with the image of the Virgin of Guadalupe carried by Hidalgo and his insurgent militia. Liberal bishop-elect Manuel Abad y Queipo denounced the insurgents' use of her image as a sacrilege.

The extent and the intensity of the movement took colonial authorities by surprise. San Miguel and Celaya were captured with little resistance. On 21 September 1810, Hidalgo was proclaimed general and supreme commander after arriving to Celaya. At this point, Hidalgo's army numbered about 5,000. However, because of the lack of discipline, the insurgents soon fell into robbing, looting, ransacking towns and executing prisoners. This caused friction between Allende and Hidalgo as early as the capture of San Miguel in late September 1810. When rioting ran through the city, Allende tried to break up violence by striking insurgents with the flat of his sword, which brought him a rebuke from Hidalgo.

On 28 September 1810, Hidalgo arrived at the city of Guanajuato with rebels who were mostly armed with sticks, stones, and machetes. The town's peninsular and criollo populations took refuge in the fortified Alhóndiga de Granaditas commanded by Juan Antonio de Riaño. The insurgents overwhelmed the defenses after two days and killed an estimated 400 – 600 people. Allende strongly protested these events and while Hidalgo agreed that they were heinous, he also stated that he understood the historical patterns that shaped such responses. The attacks prompted criollos and peninsulares to ally against the insurgents and caused Hidalgo to lose support from liberal criollos.

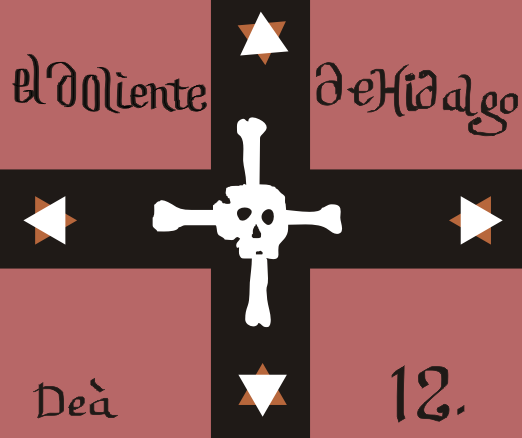
El Doliente de Hidalgo flag, captured by the Spanish army in Zitácuaro, Michoacán, 2 January 1812.

From Guanajuato, Hidalgo set off for Valladolid on 10 October 1810 with 15,000 men. When he arrived at Acámbaro, he was promoted to generalissimo and given the title of His Most Serene Highness, with power to legislate. With his new rank he had a blue uniform with a clerical collar and red lapels embroidered with silver and gold. His uniform also included a black baldric also embroidered with gold. There was also a large image of the Virgin of Guadalupe in gold on his chest.

Hidalgo and his forces took Valladolid with little opposition on 17 October 1810. There, Hidalgo issued proclamations against the peninsulares, whom he accused of arrogance and despotism, as well as enslaving those in the Americas for almost 300 years. Hidalgo argued that the objective of the war was "to send the gachupines back to the motherland", accusing their greed and tyranny as leading to the temporal and spiritual degradation of Mexicans. Hidalgo forced the Bishop-elect of Michoacan, Manuel Abad y Queipo, to rescind the excommunication order he had circulated against him on 24 September 1810. Later, the Inquisition issued an excommunication edict on 13 October 1810 condemning Hidalgo as a seditionary, apostate, and heretic.

The insurgents stayed in the city preparing to march to the capital of New Spain, Mexico City. The canon of the cathedral met Hidalgo and made him promise that the atrocities of San Miguel, Celaya and Guanajuato would not be repeated in Valladolid. Wholesale destruction of the city was not repeated. However, Hidalgo was furious when he found the cathedral locked to him, which led him to jail Spaniards, replace city officials with his own and looting the city treasury before marching off toward Mexico City. On 19 October, Hidalgo left Valladolid for Mexico City after taking 400,000 pesos from the cathedral to pay expenses.

Hidalgo and his troops left the state of Michoacán and marched through the towns of Maravatio, Ixtlahuaca, and Toluca before stopping in the forested mountain area of Monte de las Cruces. Here, insurgent forces engaged Torcuato Trujillo's royalist forces. Hidalgo's troops led the royalist troops to retreat, but the insurgents suffered heavy casualties, as they had when they engaged royalist soldiers in Guanajuato.

== Retreat from Mexico City ==
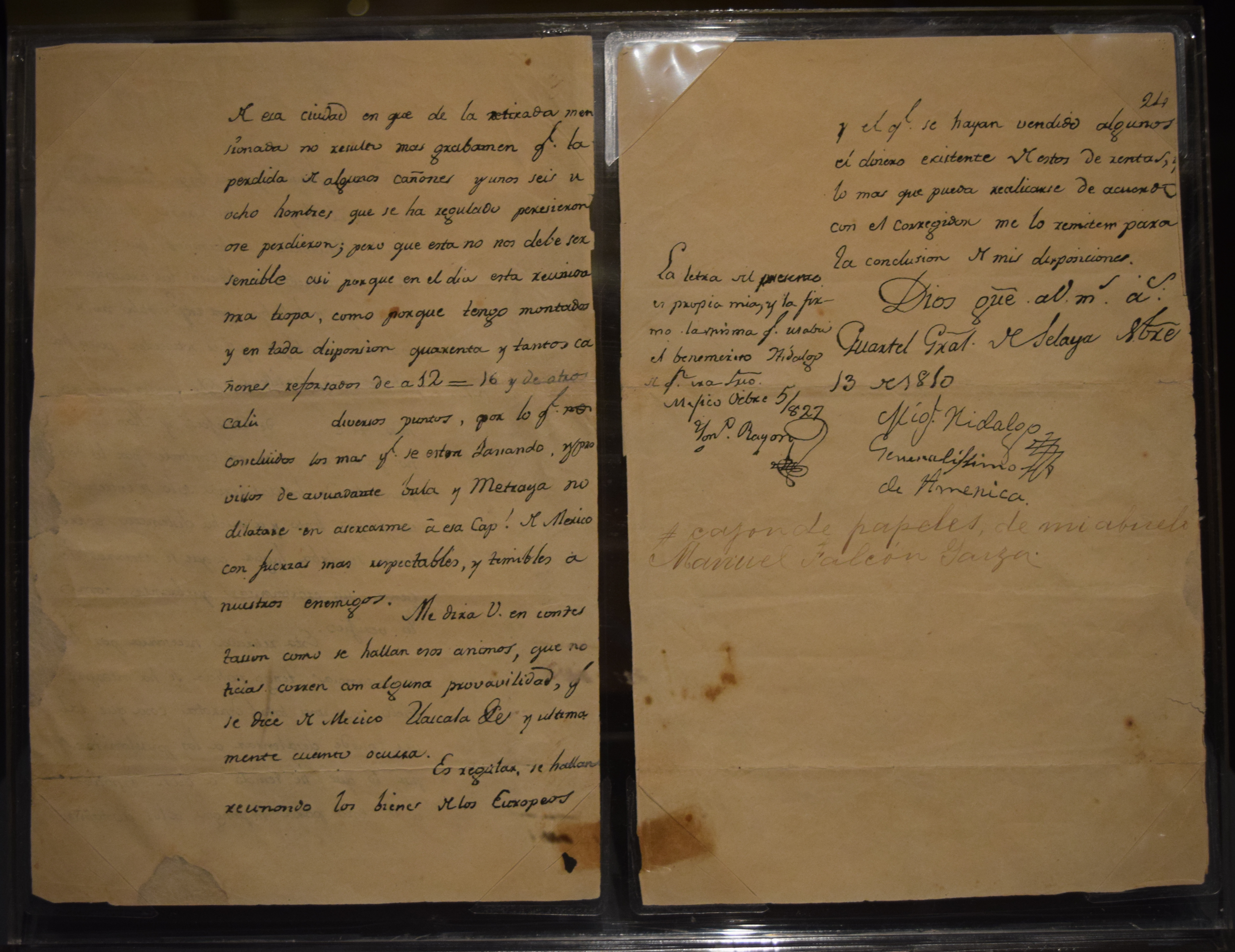
Missive that gives the explanation to avoid the attack on Mexico City, 1753 – Chihuahua, Chihuahua, Mexico, 1811

After the Battle of Monte de las Cruces on 30 October 1810, Hidalgo had some 100,000 insurgents and was in a strategic position to attack Mexico City. Numerically, his forces outnumbered royalist forces. The royalist government in Mexico City, under the leadership of Viceroy Francisco Venegas, prepared psychological and military defenses. An intensive propaganda campaign had advertised insurgent violence in the Bajío region and stressed the insurgents' threat against social stability. Hidalgo's insurgency also faced opposition from sedentary natives and castes of the Valley of Mexico.

Hidalgo's forces came as close as what is now the Cuajimalpa borough of Mexico City. Allende wanted to press forward and attack the capital, but Hidalgo disagreed. Hidalgo's reasoning for this decision is unclear and has been debated by historians. One explanation is that Hidalgo's forces were undisciplined and had suffered heavy losses whenever they encountered trained troops. As the capital was guarded by some of the most trained soldiers in New Spain, Hidalgo decided to turn away from Mexico City and move to the north through Toluca and Ixtlahuaca with a destination of Guadalajara.

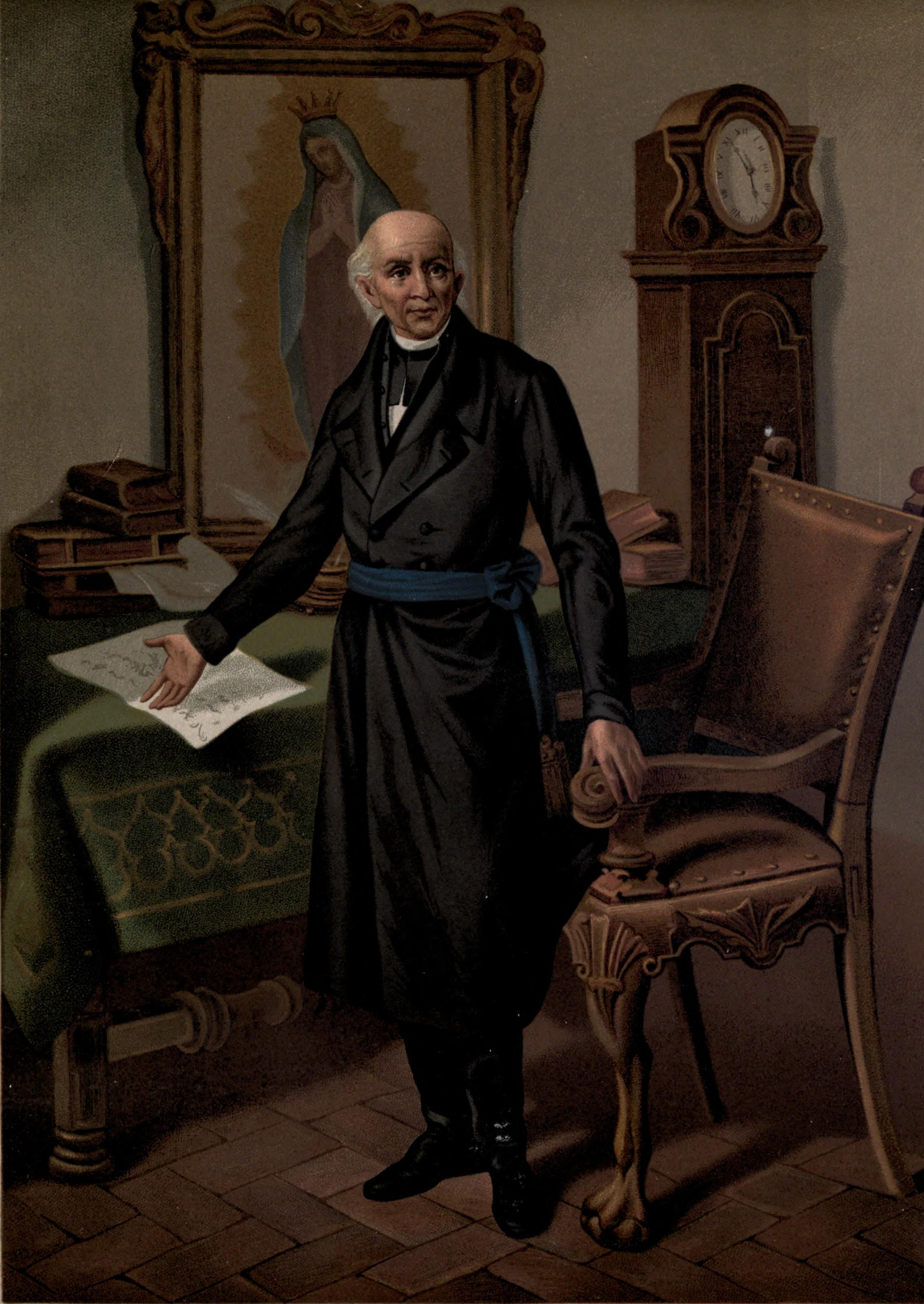
Image extracted from Vicente's book Riva Palacio, Julio Zárate (1880) "México a través de los siglos" ( Mexico through the centuries) Tomo III: "La guerra de independencia" (The war of independence) (1808–1821).

After turning back, many insurgents deserted. By the time he got to Aculco, just north of Toluca, his army had shrunk to 40,000 men. New Spain General Felix Calleja attacked Hidalgo's forces, defeating them on 7 November 1810. Allende decided to take the troops under his command to Guanajuato, instead of Guadalajara. Hidalgo arrived in Guadalajara on 26 November with more than 7,000 poorly armed troops. He initially occupied the city with lower-class support because Hidalgo promised to end slavery, tribute payment and taxes on alcohol and tobacco.

Hidalgo established an alternative government in Guadalajara with himself at the head and appointed two ministers. On 6 December 1810, Hidalgo issued a decree abolishing slavery, threatening those who did not comply with death. He abolished tribute payments that indigenous peoples had to pay to criollo and peninsular lords. He ordered the publication of a newspaper called Despertador Americano (American Wake Up Call). He named Pascacio Ortiz de Letona as representative of the insurgent government and sent him to the United States to seek support, but Ortiz de Letona was apprehended by the Spanish army and executed.

During this time, insurgent violence mounted in Guadalajara. Citizens loyal to the viceregal government were seized and executed. While indiscriminate looting was avoided, insurgents targeted properties of criollos and Spaniards, regardless of political affiliation. In the meantime, the royalist army had retaken Guanajuato, forcing Allende to flee to Guadalajara. After he arrived at the city, Allende again objected to Hidalgo concerning the insurgent violence. However, Hidalgo knew the royalist army was on its way to Guadalajara and wanted to stay on good terms with his own army.

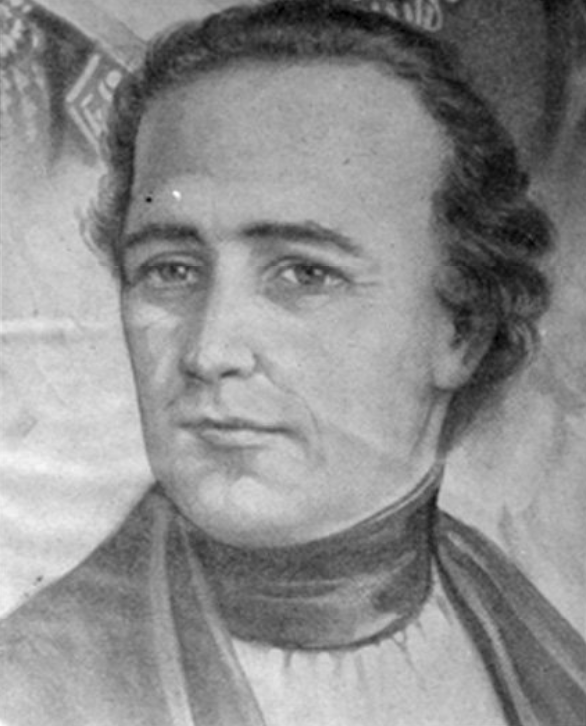
José Mariano Jiménez, one of Hidalgo's representatives

After Guanajuato had been retaken by royalist forces, Bishop Manuel Abad y Queipo excommunicated Hidalgo and those following or helping him on 24 December 1810. Abad y Queipo had formerly been a friend of Hidalgo, but he was adamantly opposed to Hidalgo's tactics and the resultant disruptions, alleged "sacrileges" and purported ill-treatment of priests. The Inquisition pronounced an edict against Hidalgo, charging him with denying that God punishes sins in this world, doubting the authenticity of the Bible, denouncing the popes and Church government, allowing Jews not to convert to Christianity, denying the perpetual virginity of Mary, preaching that there was no hell, and adopting Lutheran doctrine with regard to the Eucharist. Hidalgo responded that he had never departed from Church doctrine in the slightest degree.

Royalist forces marched to Guadalajara, arriving in January 1811 with nearly 6,000 men. Allende and Abasolo wanted to concentrate their forces in the city and plan an escape route should they be defeated, but Hidalgo rejected this, deciding to make a stand at the Calderón Bridge (Puente de Calderón) just outside the city. Hidalgo had between 80,000 and 100,000 men and 95 cannons, but the better trained royalists decisively defeated the insurgent army, forcing Hidalgo to flee towards Aguascalientes. At Hacienda de Pabellón, on 25 January 1811, near the city of Aguascalientes, Allende and other insurgent leaders took military command away from Hidalgo, blaming him for their defeats. Hidalgo remained as head politically but with military command going to Allende.

The insurgent Army moved north towards Zacatecas and Saltillo with the goal of making connections in the United States for support. Hidalgo reached Saltillo, where he publicly resigned his military post and rejected a pardon offered by General José de la Cruz in the name of Venegas in return for Hidalgo's surrender. A short time later, they were betrayed and captured by royalist Ignacio Elizondo at the Wells of Baján (Norias de Baján) on 21 March 1811 and taken to Chihuahua.

== Execution ==
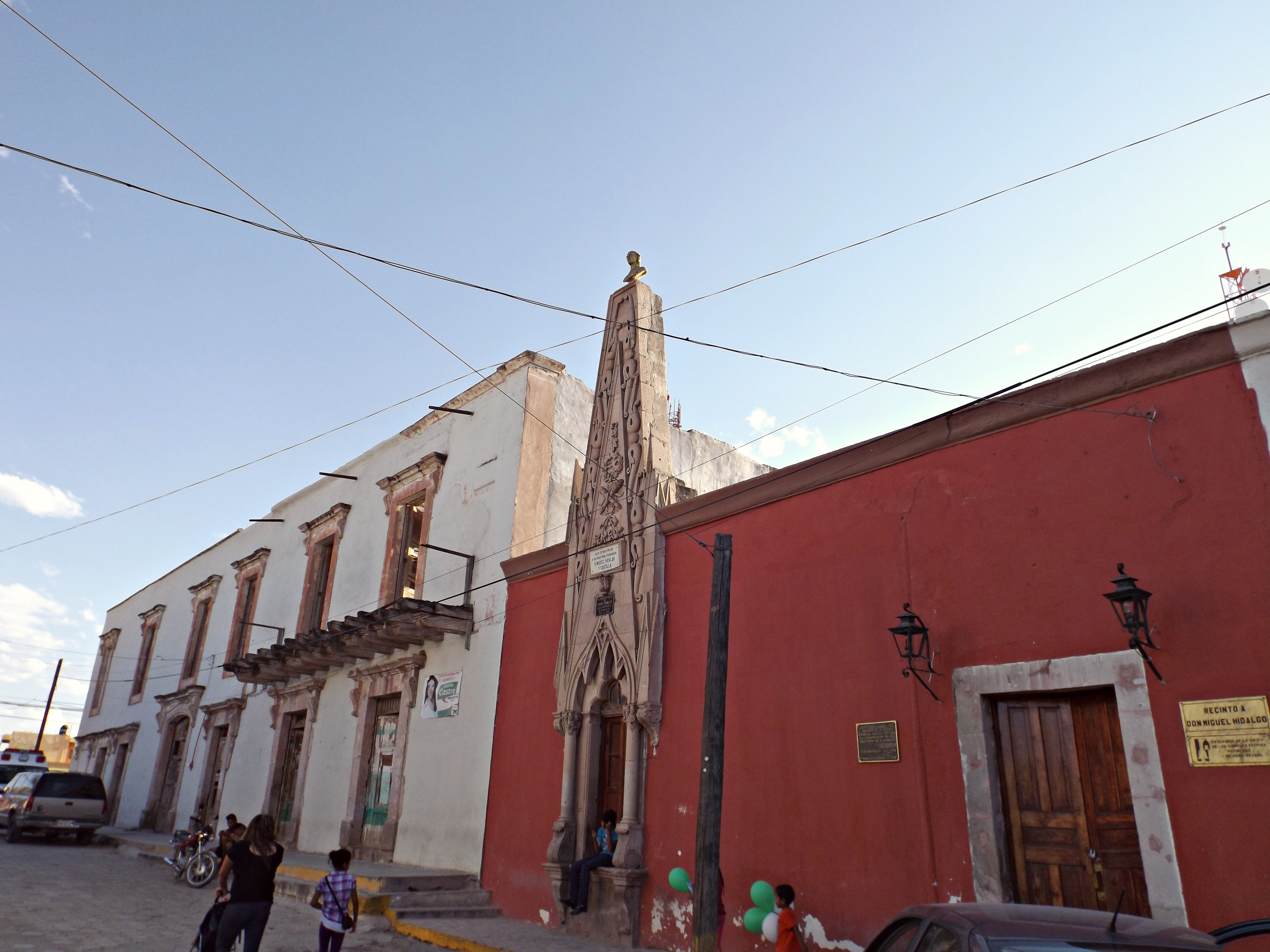
State of Durango's prison where Hidalgo was imprisoned in his capture in 1811

Hidalgo was turned over to Durango, where Bishop Francisco Gabriel de Olivares had him officially defrocked and excommunicated on 27 July 1811. He was subsequently declared guilty of treason by a military court. He was tortured through the flaying of his hands, symbolically removing the chrism placed upon them at his priestly ordination, and executed. There are many theories about how he was killed; the most popular is that he was killed by firing squad in the morning of 30 July. Before his execution, he thanked his jailers, two soldiers, Ortega and Melchor, for their humane treatment. At his execution, Hidalgo stated "Though I may die, I shall be remembered forever; you all will soon be forgotten." His body and the bodies of Allende, Aldama and José Mariano Jiménez were decapitated, and the heads were put on display in the four corners of the Alhóndiga de Granaditas in Guanajuato. The heads remained there for ten years until the end of the Mexican War of Independence to demoralize insurgents. Hidalgo's headless body was first displayed outside the prison and then buried in the Church of St Francis in Chihuahua. The remains were transferred to Mexico City in 1824.

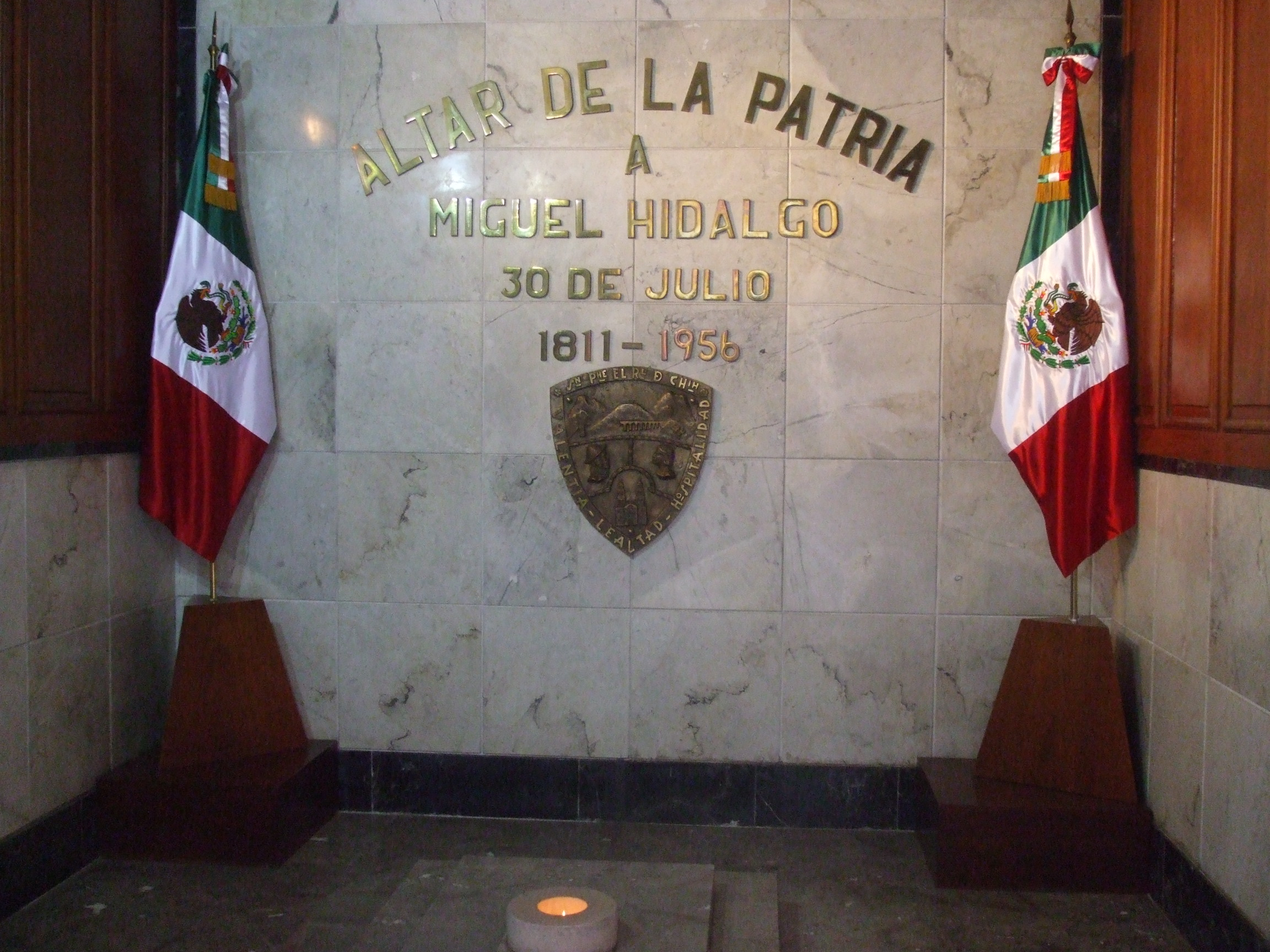
The Altar of the Fatherland; the spot where Hidalgo was executed by the Spanish in the present-day Government Palace of Chihuahua, Chihuahua City

Hidalgo's death resulted in a political vacuum on the insurgent side until 1812. The royalist military commander, General Félix Calleja, continued to pursue rebel troops. Insurgent fighting evolved into guerrilla warfare, and eventually the next major insurgent leader, José María Morelos Pérez y Pavón, who had led rebel movements with Hidalgo, became head of the insurgents, until Morelos himself was captured and executed in 1815.

== Legacy ==
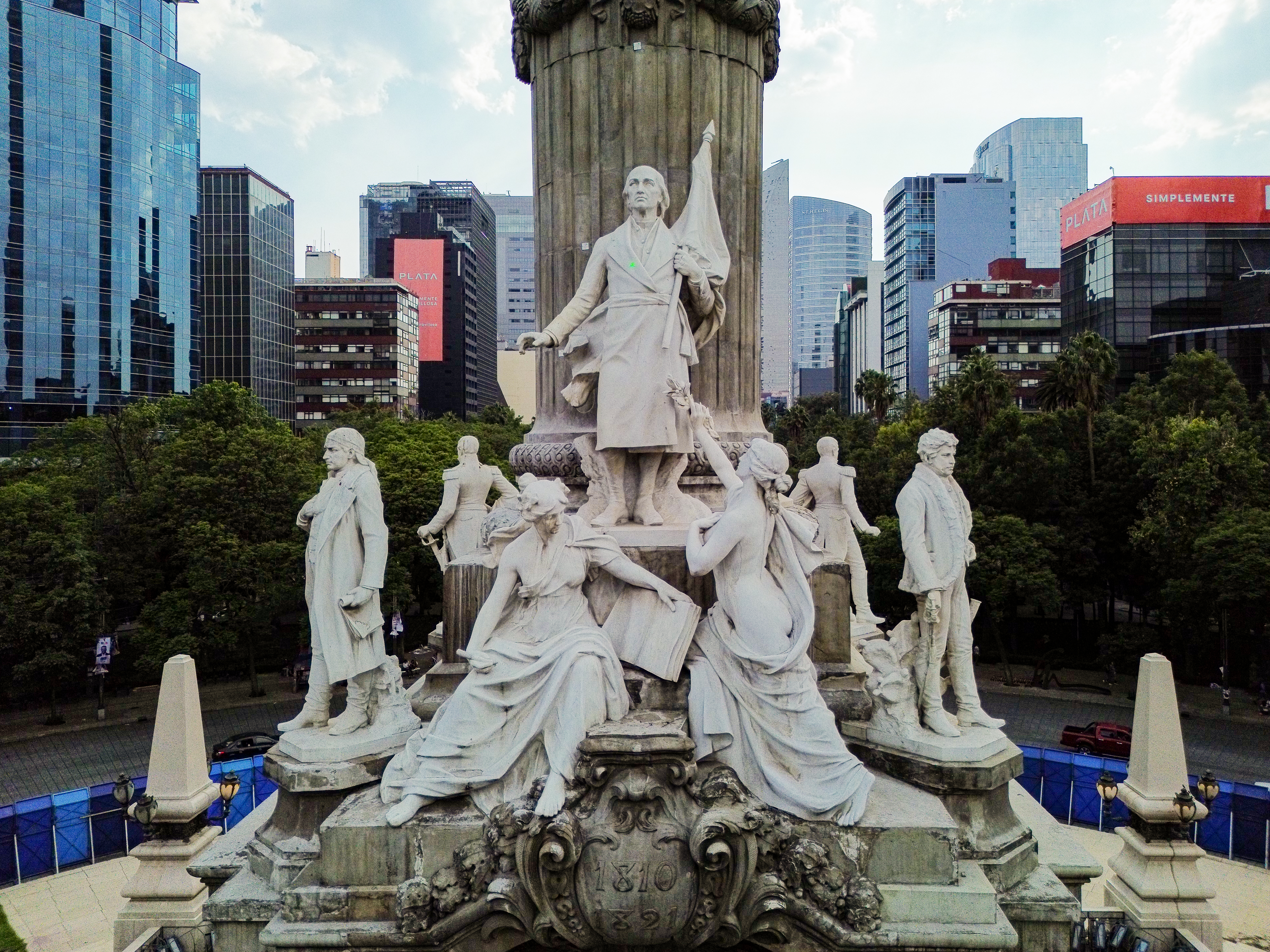
Apotheosis of the Father of the Nation on the Independence Monument, front view

"Miguel Hidalgo y Costilla had the unique distinction of being a father in three senses of the word: a priestly father in the Roman Catholic Church, a biological father who produced illegitimate children in violation of his clerical vows, and the father of his country." He has been hailed as the Father of the Nation even though it was Agustín de Iturbide and not Hidalgo who became the first head of state of Mexico in 1821. Shortly after gaining independence, the day to celebrate it varied between 16 September, the day of Hidalgo's Grito de Dolores, and 27 September, when Iturbide's forces captured Mexico City, ending the war.

Later, political movements would favor the more liberal Hidalgo over the conservative Iturbide, and 16 September 1810 became officially recognized as the day of Mexican independence. The reason for this is that Hidalgo is considered to be "precursor and creator of the rest of the heroes of the (Mexican War of) Independence."

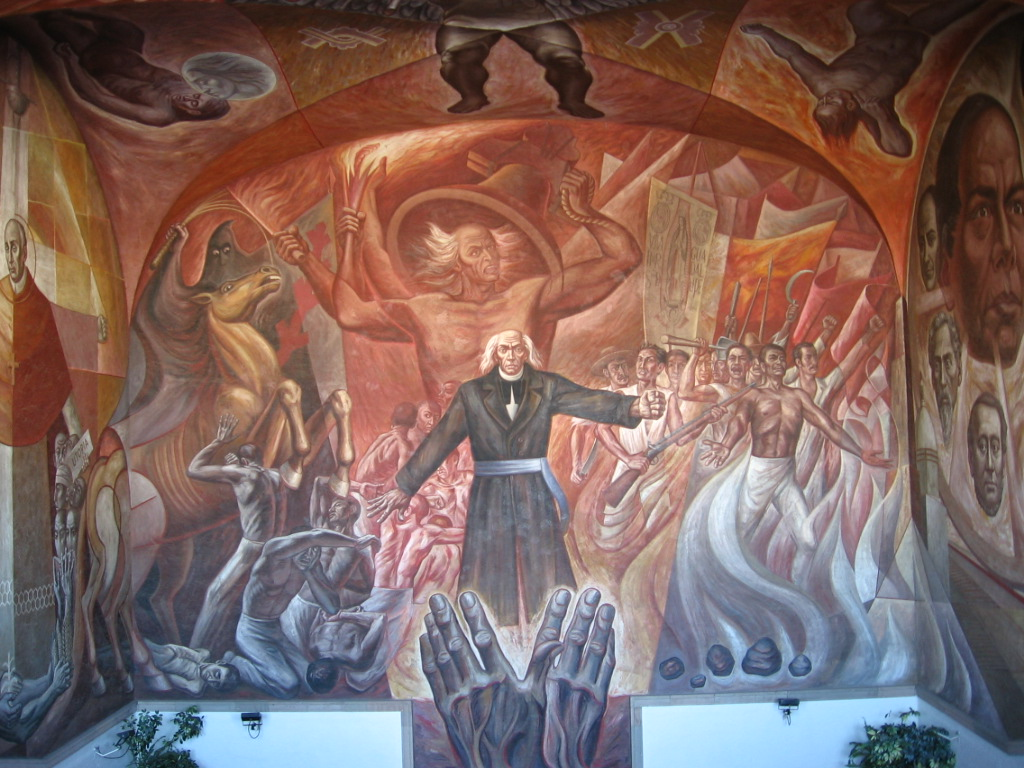
Mural of Miguel Hidalgo y Costilla

Diego Rivera painted Hidalgo's image in half a dozen murals. José Clemente Orozco depicted him with a flaming torch of liberty and considered the painting among his best work. David Alfaro Siqueiros was commissioned by San Nicolas McGinty University in Morelia to paint a mural for a celebration commemorating the 200th anniversary of Hidalgo's birth. The town of his parish was renamed Dolores Hidalgo in his honor and the state of Hidalgo was created in 1869. Every year on the night of 15–16 September, the president of Mexico re-enacts the Grito from the balcony of the National Palace. This scene is repeated by the heads of cities and towns all over Mexico. He is also the namesake of Hidalgo County, Texas, in the United States.

The remains of Hidalgo lie in the column of the Angel of Independence in Mexico City. Next to it is a lamp lit to represent the sacrifice of those who gave their lives for Mexican Independence.

His birthday is a civic holiday in Mexico.

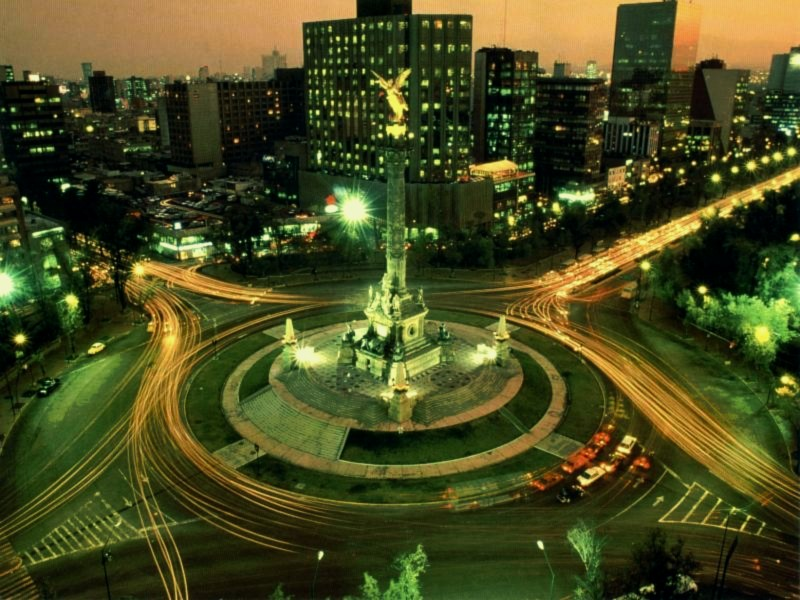
Hidalgo was laid to rest at the base of the Angel of Independence, Mexico City

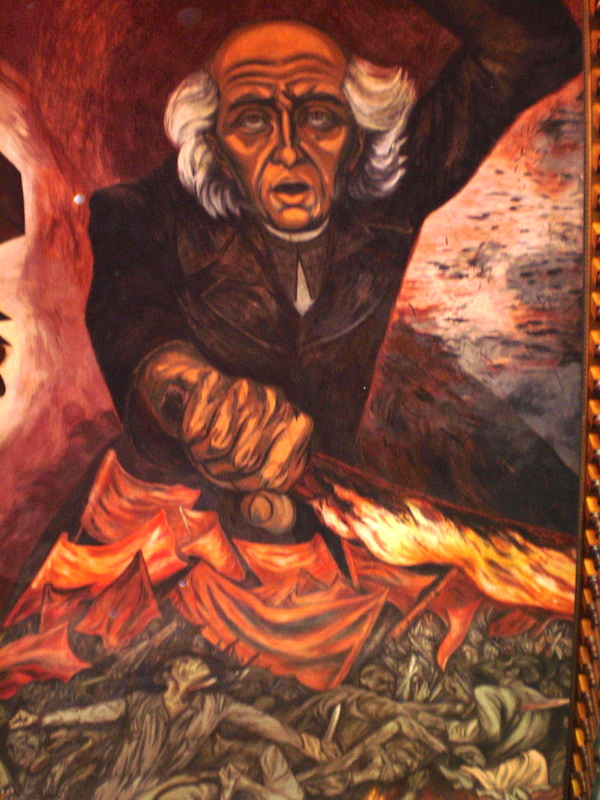
Painting of Hidalgo, by José Clemente Orozco, Jalisco Governmental Palace, Guadalajara

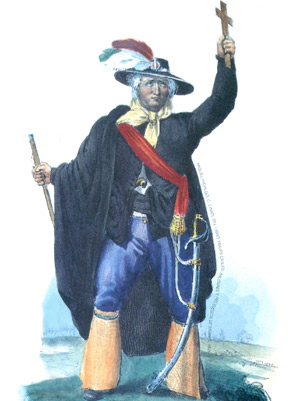
Romantic portrait, by Claudio Linati (1828)

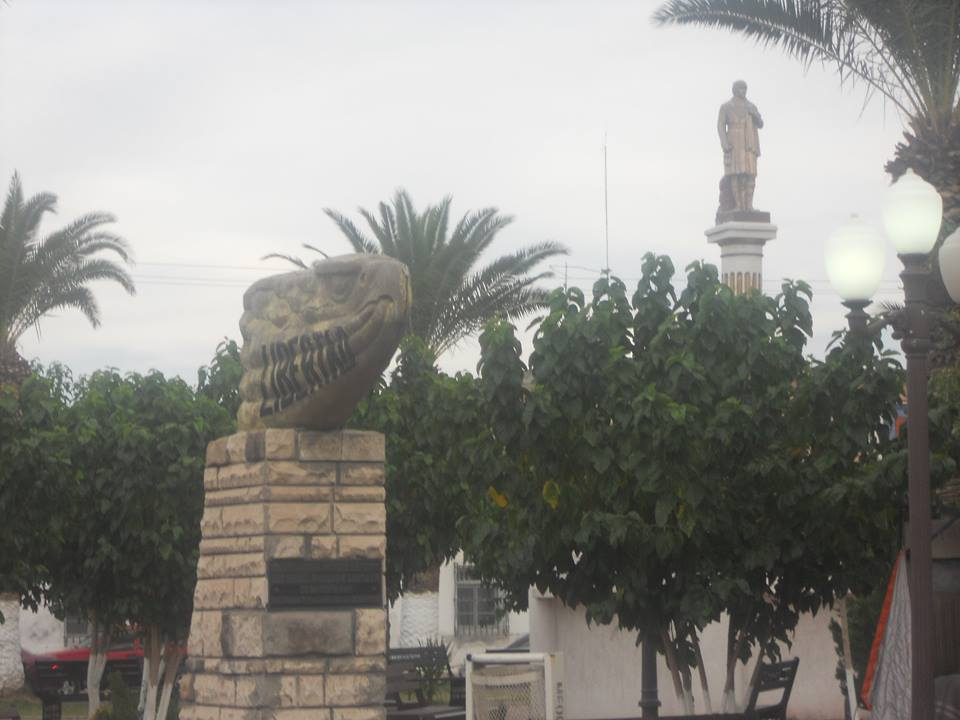
Don Miguel Hidalgo Square and Freedom Route

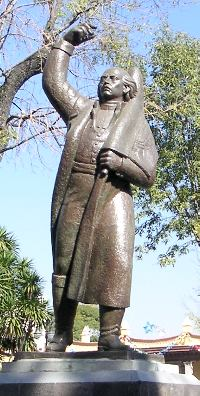
Statue at Plaza Hidalgo, Coyoacán

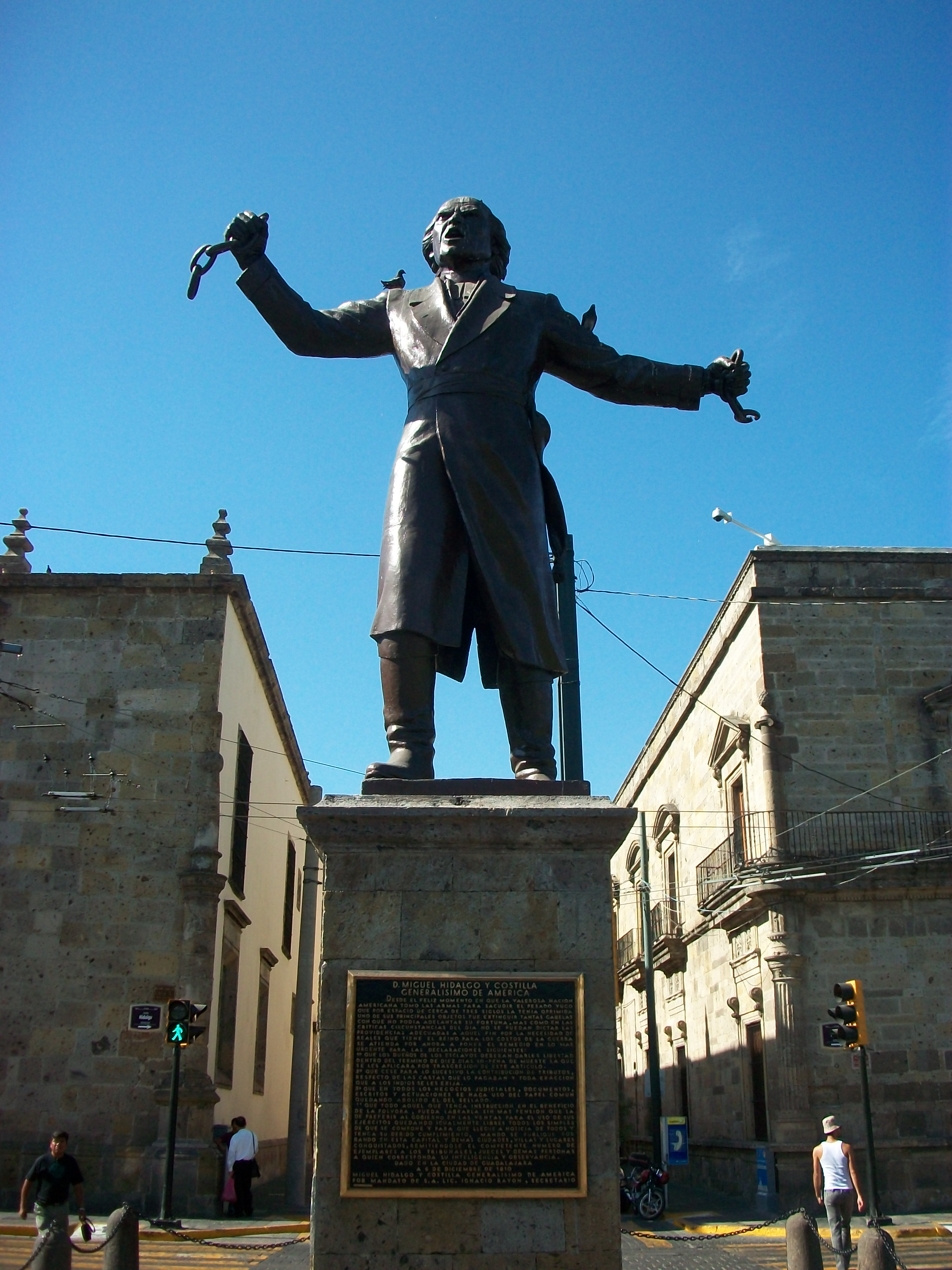
Statue in Guadalajara, Jalisco

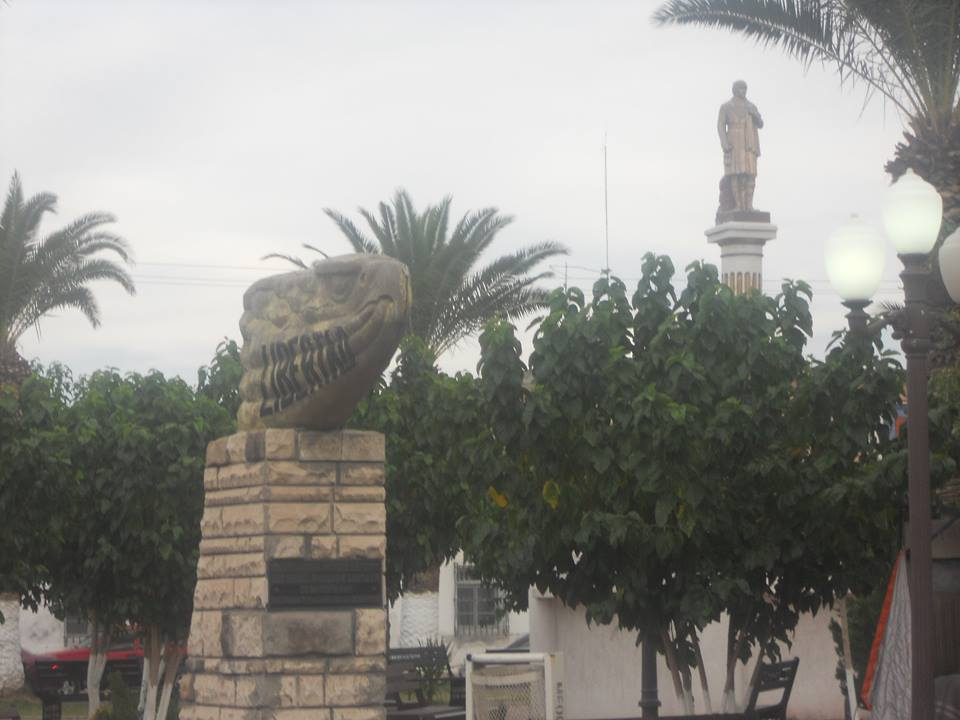
Plaza Don Miguel Hidalgo, Chihuahua

== See also ==
- Minor planet 944 Hidalgo, named after Miguel Hidalgo y Costilla
- Hidalgo: La historia jamás contada (2010 film)
- Statue of Miguel Hidalgo y Costilla (disambiguation)
- Banner of the Virgin of Guadalupe
