= Statue of Benito Juárez, Cholula =

Statue in Cholula, Puebla, Mexico

Statue of Benito Juárez
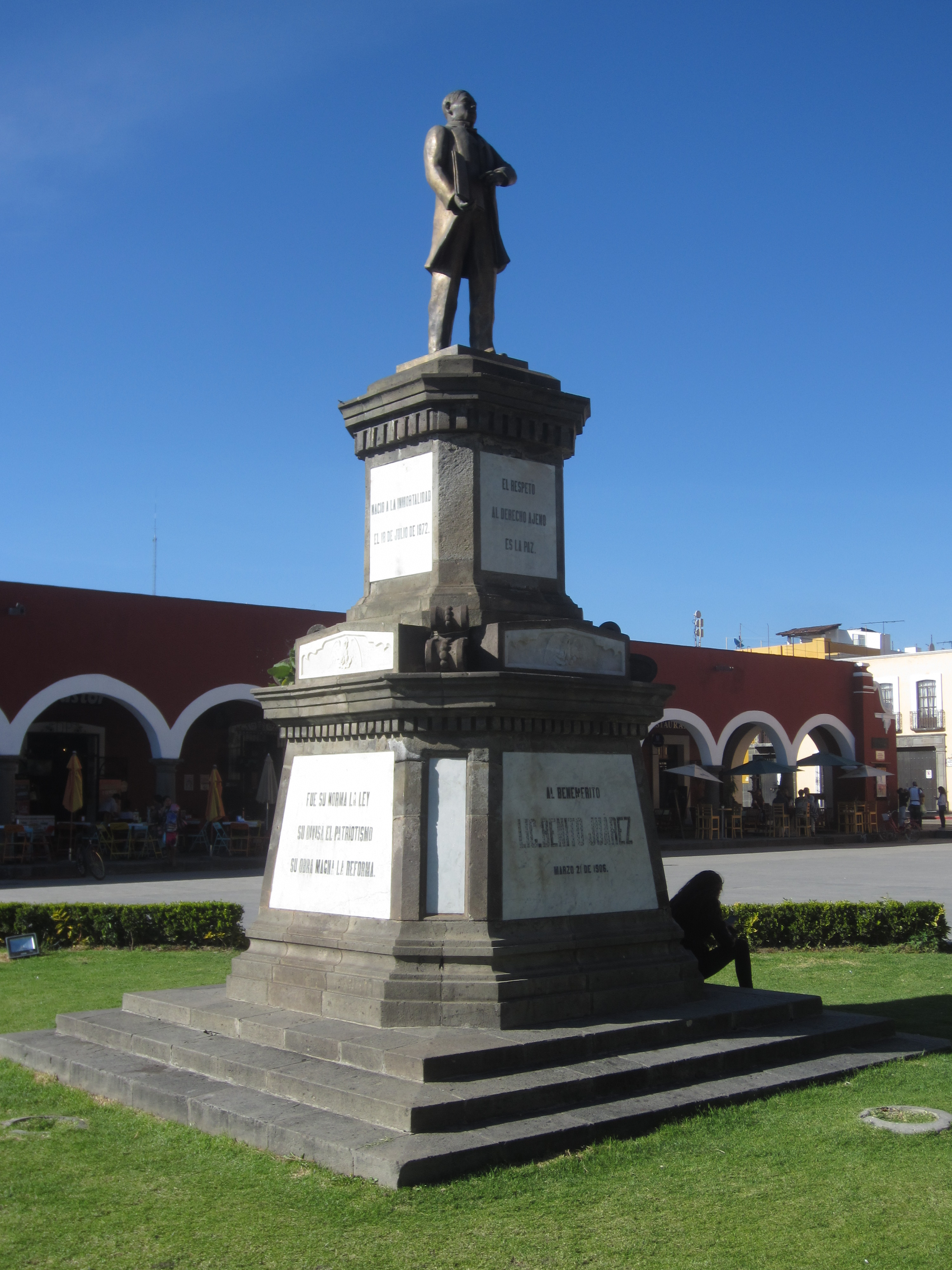
- The memorial in 2018
- Subject: Benito Juárez
- Location: Cholula, Puebla, Mexico; 19°3′47.4″N 98°18′24.3″W

The statue of Benito Juárez is installed in Cholula, Puebla's Plaza de la Concordia, in Mexico.
