= San Miguel Arcángel Fountain (Cholula) =

Fountain in Cholula, Puebla, Mexico

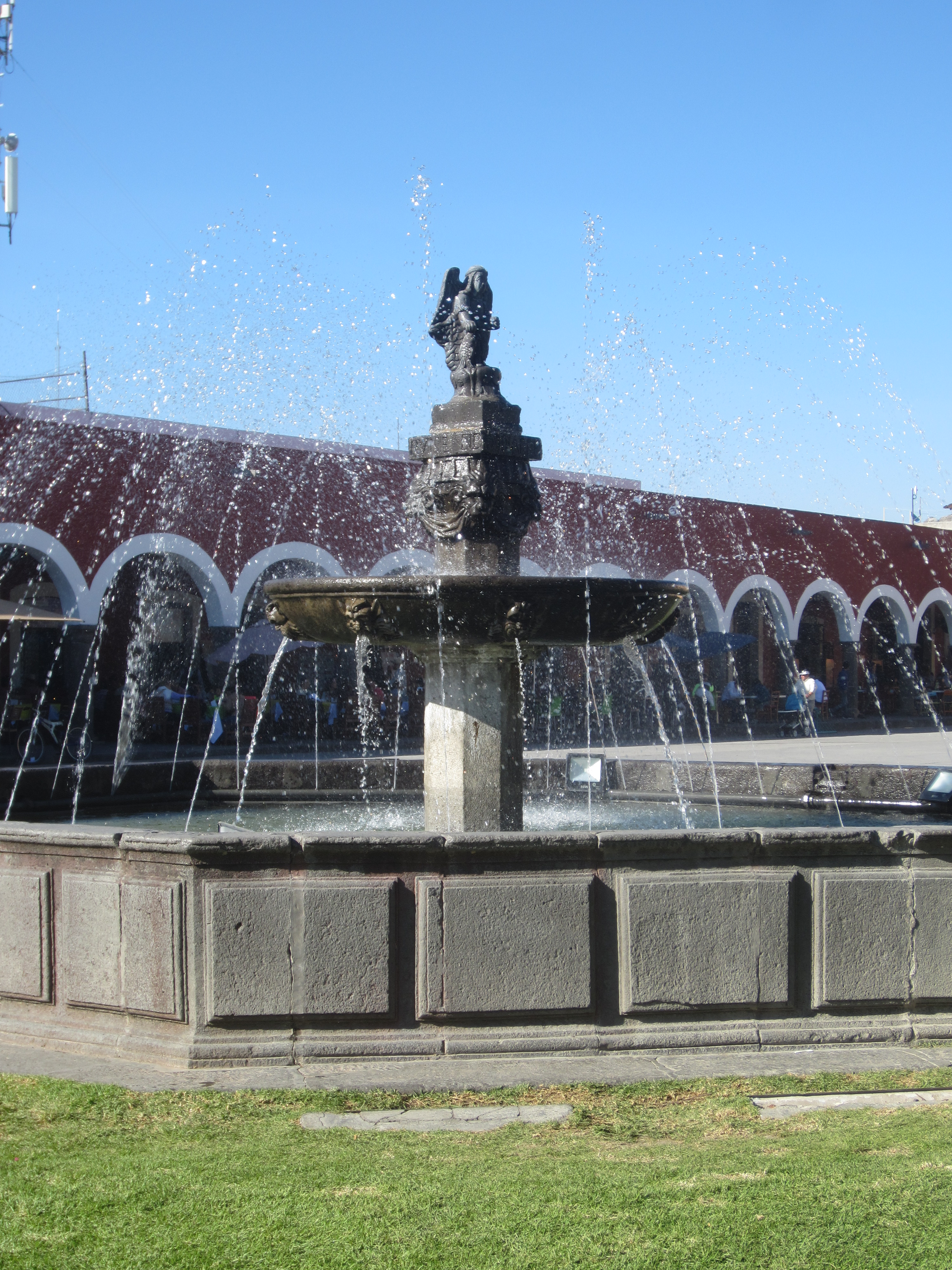
- The fountain 2018
- Location: Cholula, Puebla, Mexico; 19°3′46″N 98°18′25″W

San Miguel Arcángel Fountain is installed in Cholula, Puebla's Plaza de la Concordia, in Mexico. The fountain was gifted by Philip II of Spain in 1554.

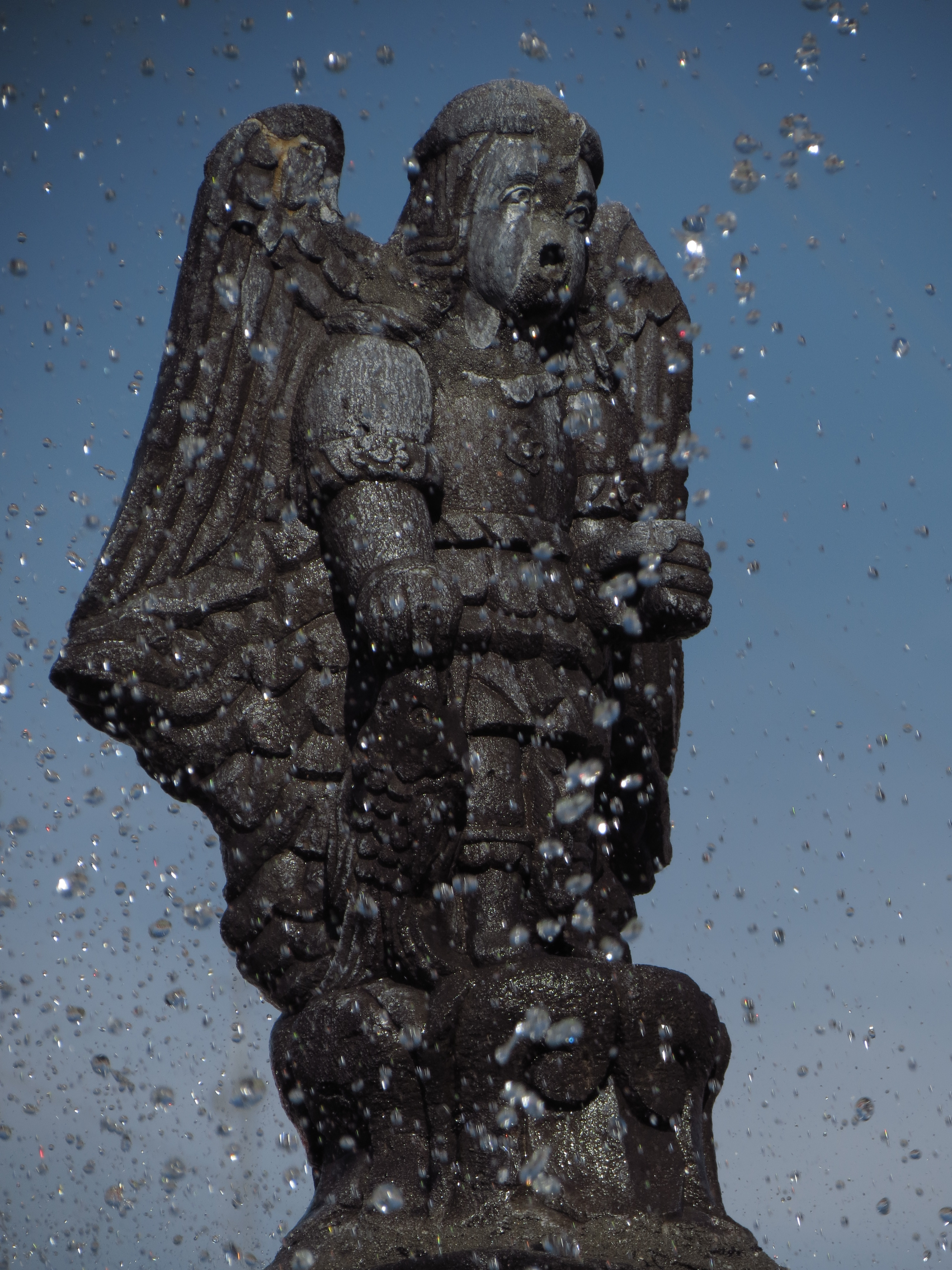
Detail of the sculpture, 2017
