= Statue of Miguel Hidalgo y Costilla, Guadalajara =

Statue of Guadalajara, Jalisco, Mexico

Statue of Miguel Hidalgo y Costilla
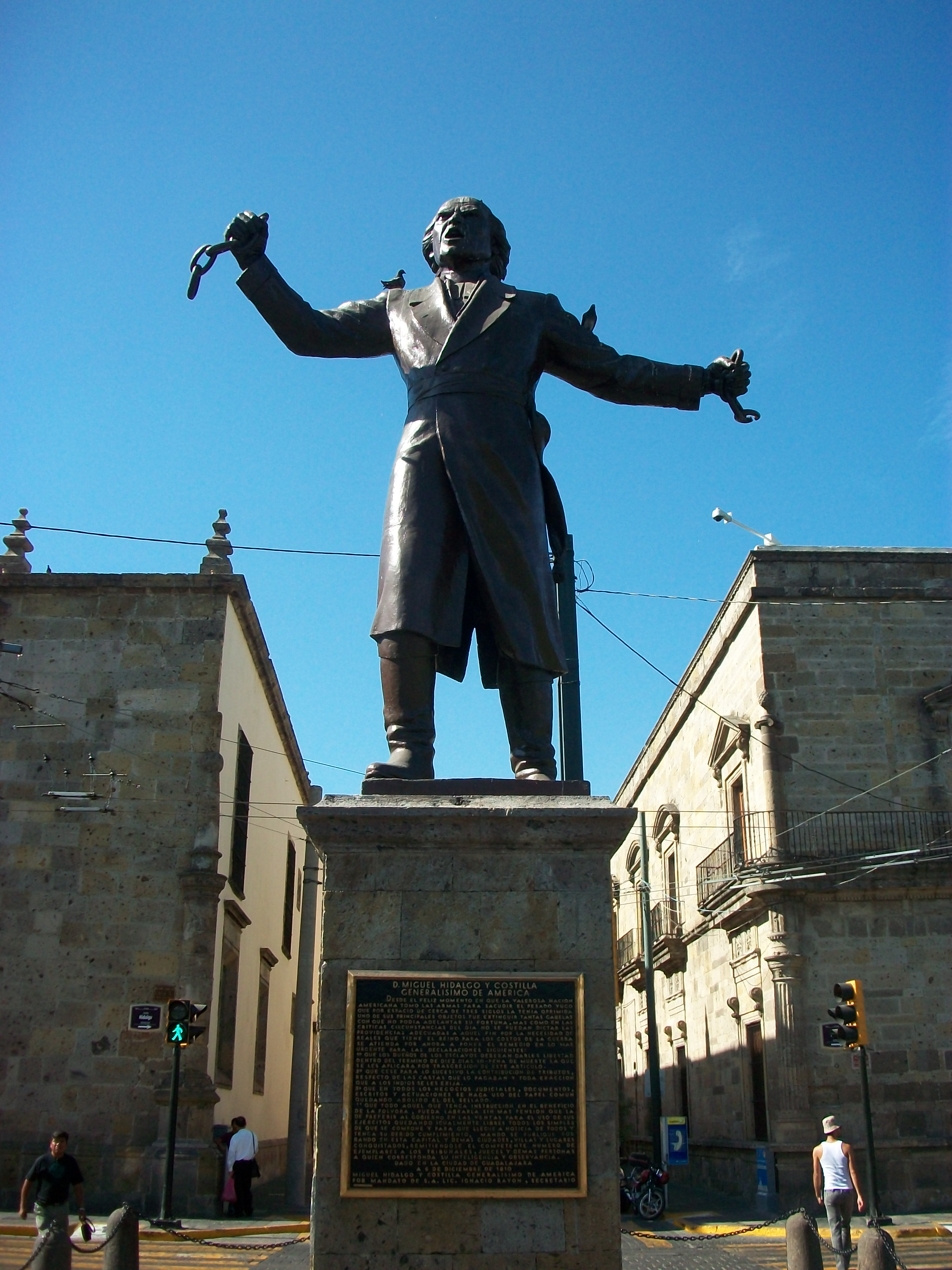
- The statue in 2010
- Artist: Ignacio Díaz Morales
- Year: 1952
- Medium: Bronze
- Subject: Miguel Hidalgo y Costilla
- Location: Guadalajara, Jalisco, Mexico; 20°40′38.2″N 103°20′44.9″W

A statue of Miguel Hidalgo y Costilla is installed in front of the Legislative Palace of Guadalajara, in the Mexican state of Jalisco. Hidalgo y Costilla is depicted enraged, breaking chains of slavery and urging for freedom. The bronze statue is 4 meters (13 ft) tall and was designed by Ignacio Díaz Morales. It was unveiled in 1952 along with the Plaza de la Liberación.
