= Tourism in Mexico =

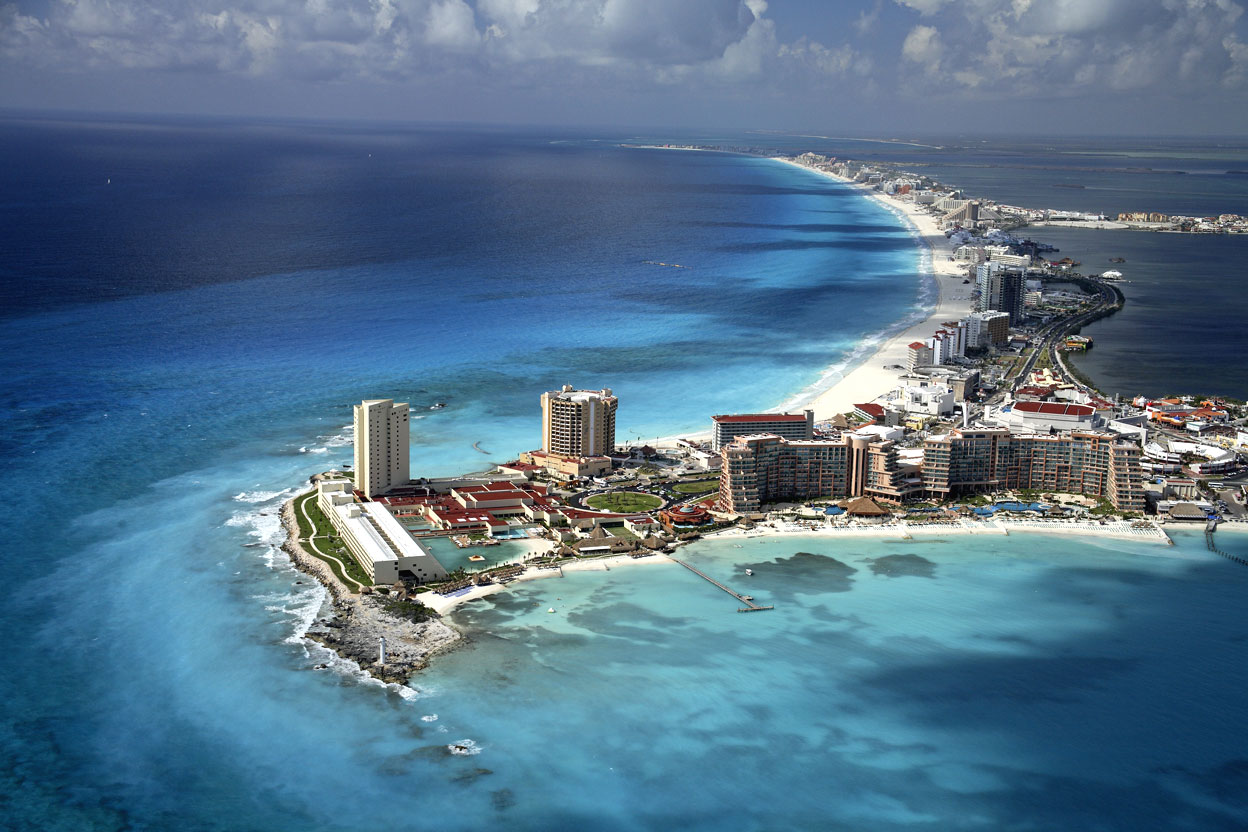
The beaches and nightlife of Cancún and its Hotel Zone make it a popular tourist destination

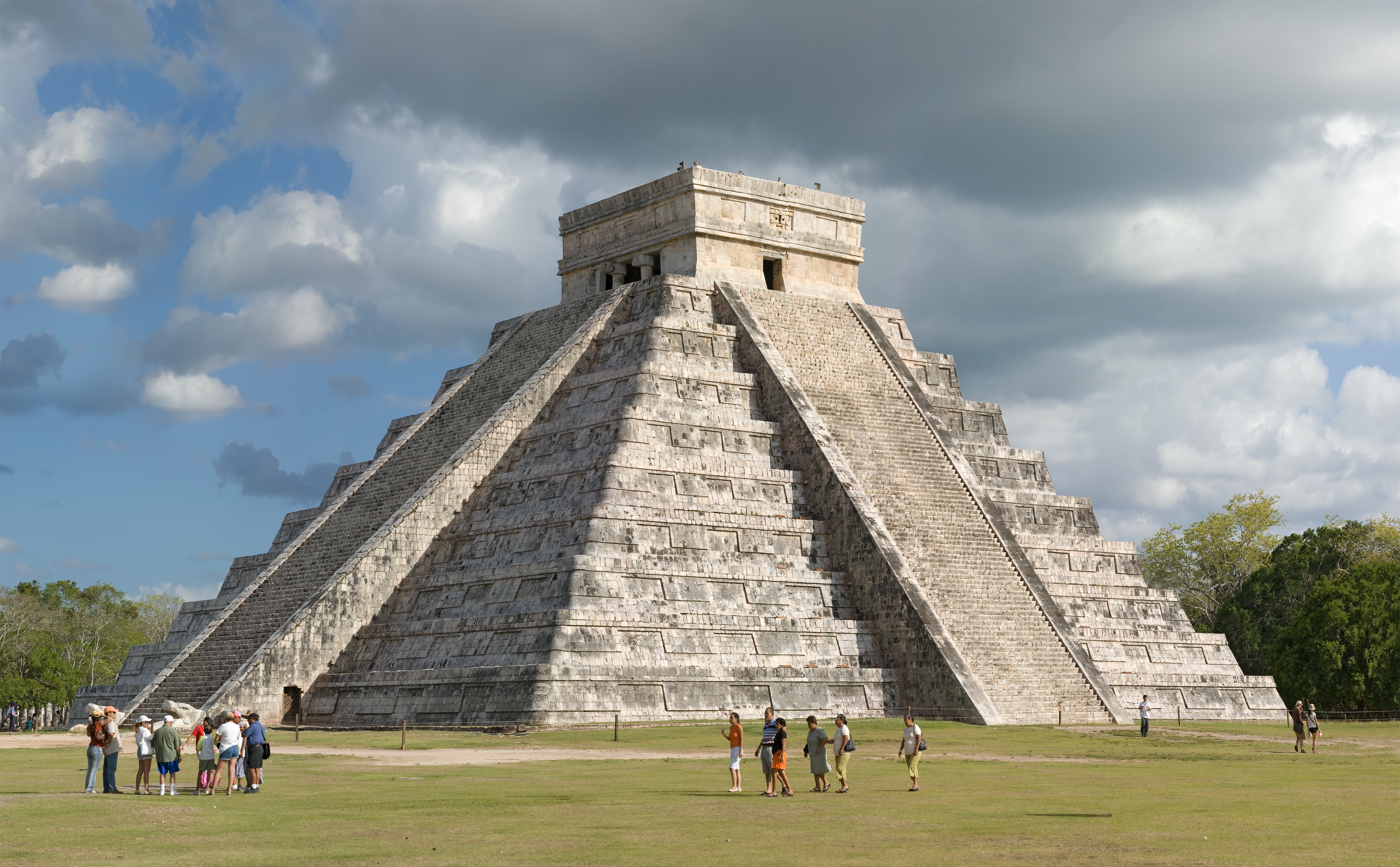
"The Castle" of Chichen Itza, one of the New Seven Wonders of the World, Yucatán

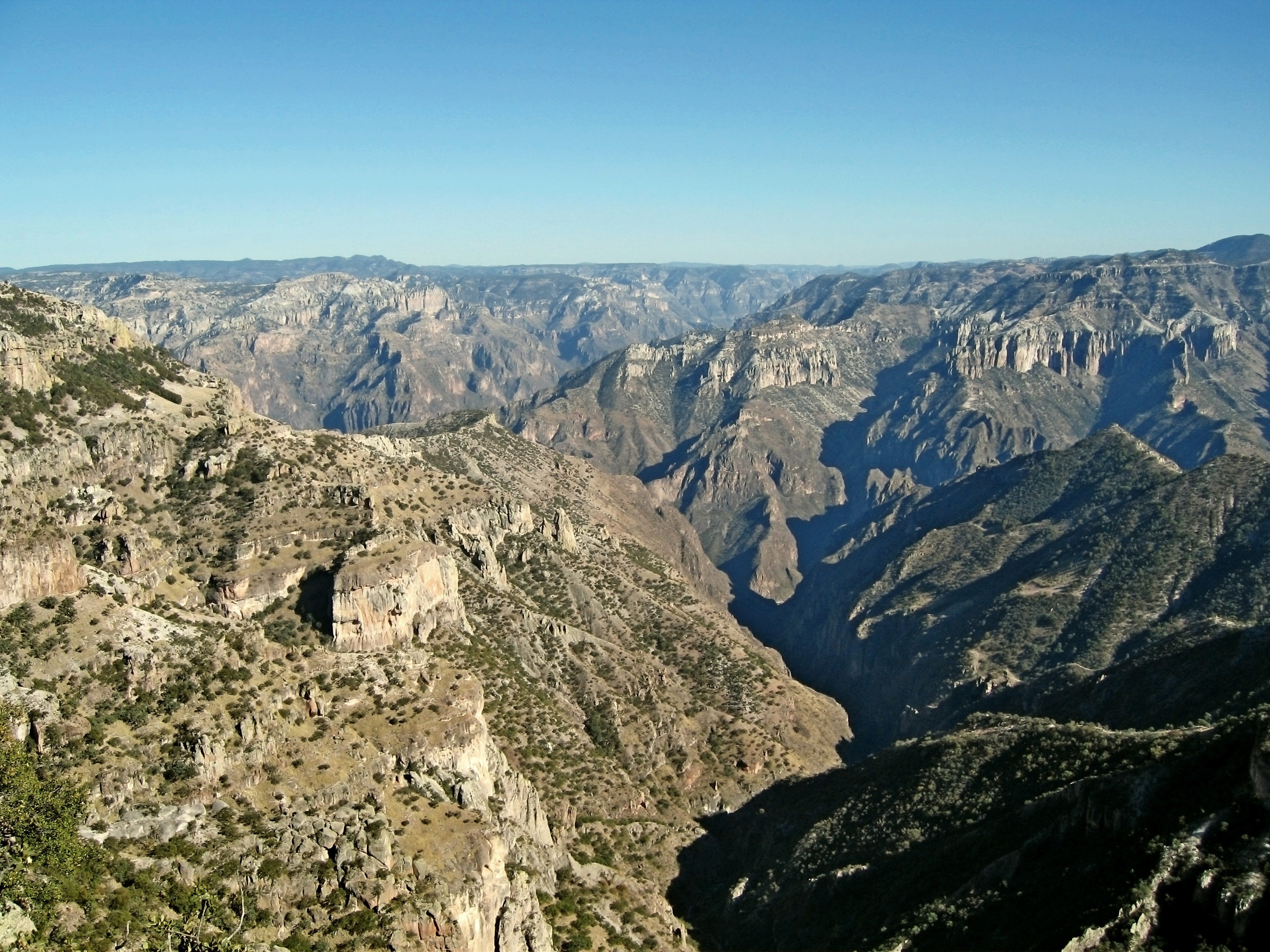
View on the Copper Canyon (barranca del cobre) in Chihuahua, Mexico

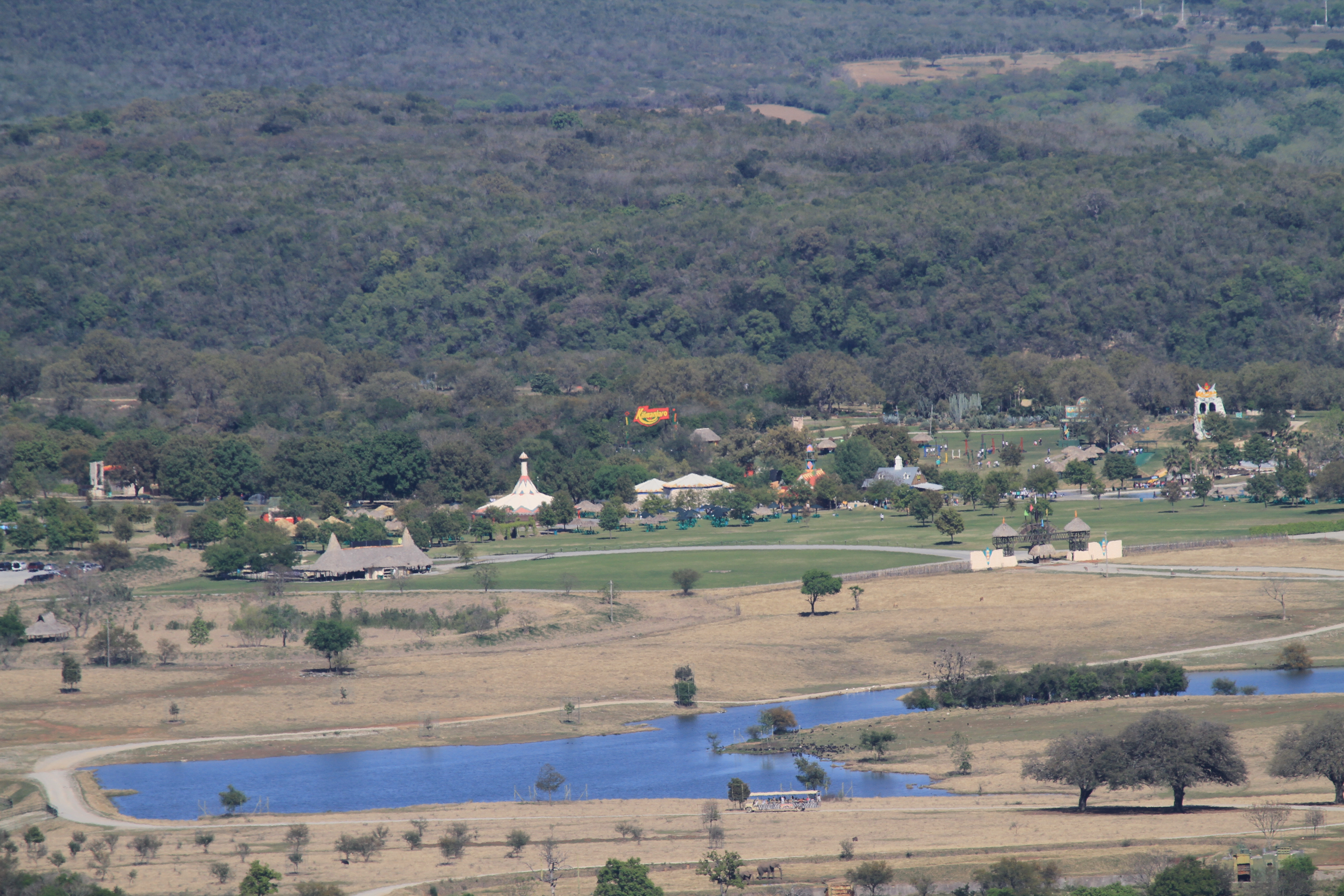
Bioparque Estrella, a park and zoo in the State of Mexico

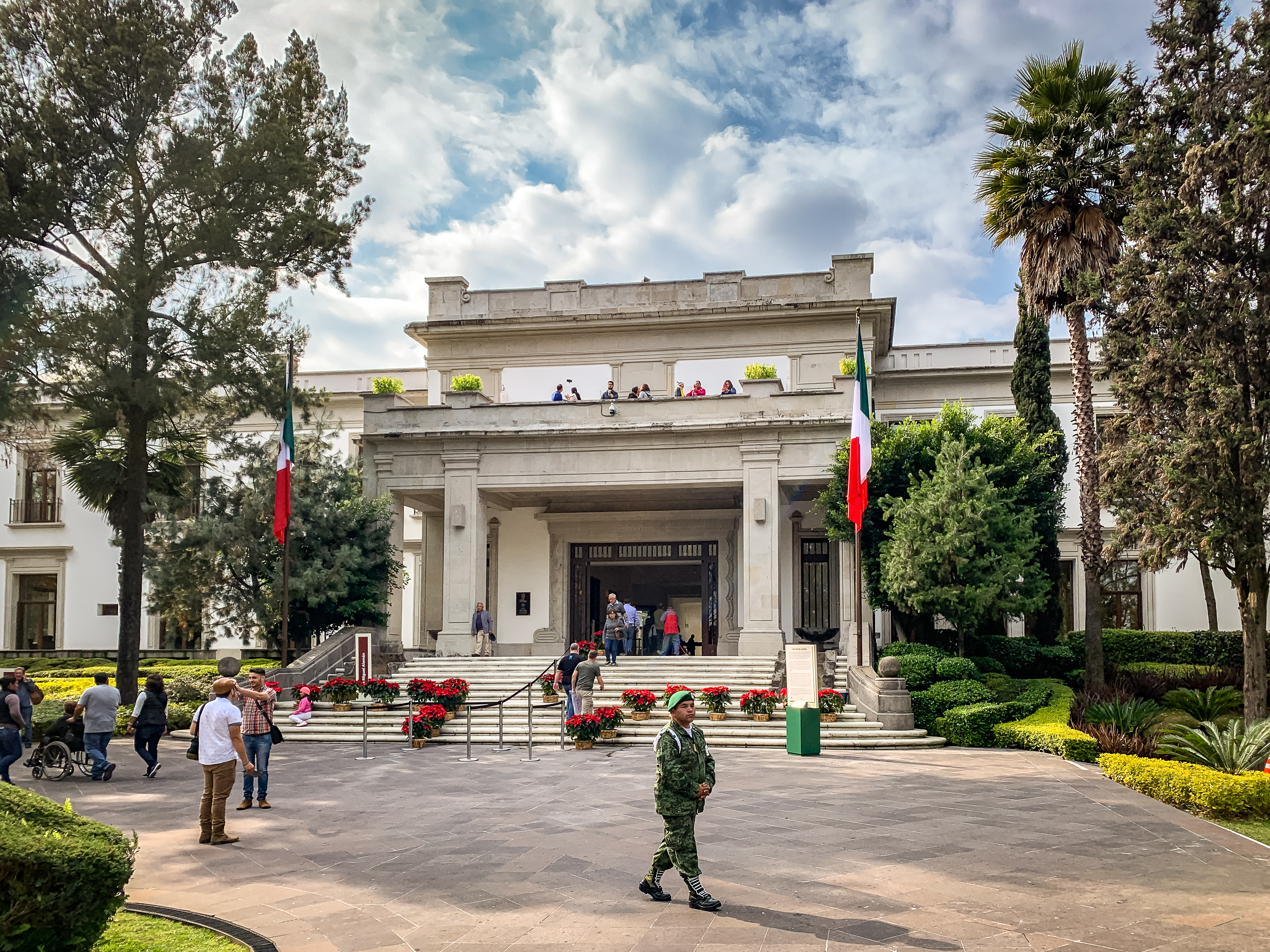
Los Pinos, now a cultural space, Mexico City

Tourism holds considerable significance as a pivotal industry within Mexico's economic landscape. Beginning in the 1960s, it has been vigorously endorsed by the Mexican government, often heralded as "an industry without smokestacks," signifying its non-polluting and economically beneficial nature.

Mexico has consistently ranked among the world's most frequented nations, as documented by the World Tourism Organization. Second only to the United States in the Americas, Mexico's status as a premier tourist destination is underscored by its standing as the sixth-most visited country globally for tourism activities, as of 2017. The country boasts a noteworthy array of UNESCO World Heritage Sites, encompassing ancient ruins, colonial cities, and natural reserves, alongside a plethora of modern public and private architectural marvels.

Mexico has attracted foreign visitors beginning in the early nineteenth century, with its cultural festivals, colonial cities, nature reserves and beach resorts. Mexico's allure to tourists is largely attributed to its temperate climate and distinctive cultural amalgamation, blending European and Mesoamerican influences. The nation experiences peak tourism seasons typically during December and the mid-summer months. Additionally, brief spikes in visitor numbers occur in the weeks preceding Easter and spring break, notably drawing college students from the United States to popular beach resort locales.

Visitors to Mexico originates primarily from the United States and Canada. Additionally, Mexico attracts visitors from various Latin American countries, with a smaller contingent coming from Europe and Asia.

== History of tourism ==
=== 19th century ===
Tourism in Mexico burgeoned subsequent to the establishment of the Mexican republic. Noteworthy figures such as Alexander von Humboldt, Frannie Calderón de la Barca, John Lloyd Stephens, and Edward B. Tylor significantly contributed to the burgeoning interest in Mexico as a tourist destination through their writings and explorations. Alexander von Humboldt, a renowned naturalist and explorer, penned detailed accounts of his travels throughout Mexico during the early 19th century. His comprehensive observations on Mexico's geography, flora, and fauna captured the imagination of many prospective travelers, thus fostering an initial interest in the region.

Tourists from the United States began arriving in Mexico in numbers starting in the 1880s, following the construction of direct railway lines in Mexico to the U.S. border. General Porfirio Díaz became president of Mexico by coup in 1876, the beginning of a long period of peace in Mexico following decades of civil war. With the inauguration of direct Pullman service from the U.S. to Mexico in 1884, tourists no longer endured difficult and dangerous travel. The Mexican Central Railway actively promoted tourism in the United States, hiring a professional photographer, William Henry Jackson, to visually record the route and a professional writer, James W. Steel, to write promotional copy. Guides for English-speaking tourists were also published, most notably Terry's Guide to Mexico, which went through several editions at the beginning of the twentieth century. Mexico appealed to American tourists seeking an "exotic" holiday. It was promoted in 1890 as the "Egypt of the New World." With the 1910 centennial of Mexican independence, the government undertook an excavation and reconstruction of the Pyramid of the Sun at the huge archeological site of Teotihuacan, near Mexico City. A railway line was constructed from the capital to the site, bringing scholars from the 1910 meeting of the International Congress of Americanists. In addition, the National Museum of Anthropology was refurbished in advance of the celebrations, in anticipation of tourists. Mexico was a beneficiary of the increasing tourism of Europeans and Americans to distant lands. In Mexico, many tourists brought home real or fake relics, and often left graffiti.

=== 20th and 21st centuries ===
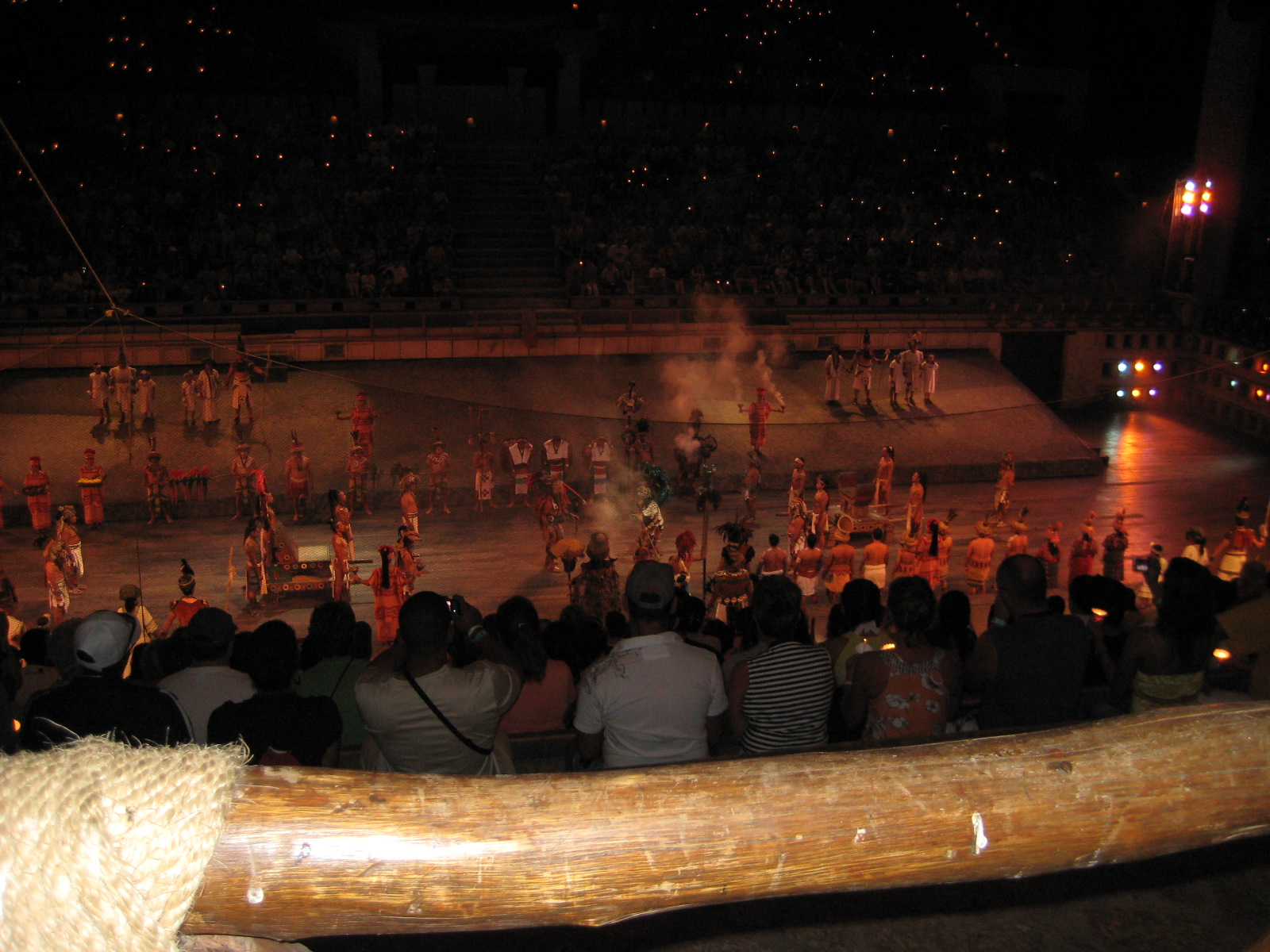
Xcaret Park Mexico Spectacular

The Mexican Revolution (1910-1920) interrupted tourism in Mexico, but by the 1930s, the Mexican government began promoting tourism again with posters of light-skinned young women and lush gardens. In the 1920s and 30s, there was an "enormous vogue of things Mexico" in the United States, resulting in cultural exchanges, temporary and permanent art exhibitions, and patronage of Mexican artists, such as muralists Diego Rivera and José Clemente Orozco. Starting with the administration of Plutarco Elías Calles (1924–28), the Mexican government became involved in promoting tourism in Mexico, eventually becoming a cabinet position, the Ministry of Tourism in 1975.

In 1929, Mexican president Emilio Portes Gil officially announced the country's entry into the tourism industry. Over the next few years, the industry stayed small because of the ongoing Great Depression, so the government focused its attention on research and was ready after World War II to welcome tourists who could no longer visit Europe instead.

During the Jazz Age and the era of Prohibition of alcohol in the U.S., border towns in Mexico, particularly Tijuana became destinations for vice tourism. The song "South of the Border (down Mexico way)" song by Frank Sinatra helped promote the region. It was known for casino gambling, glitzy floor shows, horse- and dog-racing, and other hedonistic pursuits. Chicago gangster Al Capone frequented the Agua Caliente resort, as did big names from Hollywood. "Mafia chic and Hollywood star power fueled the Tijuana mystique and imbued it with ersatz glamour." When Lázaro Cárdenas became president of Mexico, 1934–40, he cracked down on casino gambling in northern Mexico, since it was a source of money and power for Cárdenas's political rivals, former presidents Plutarco Elías Calles and Abelardo L. Rodríguez.

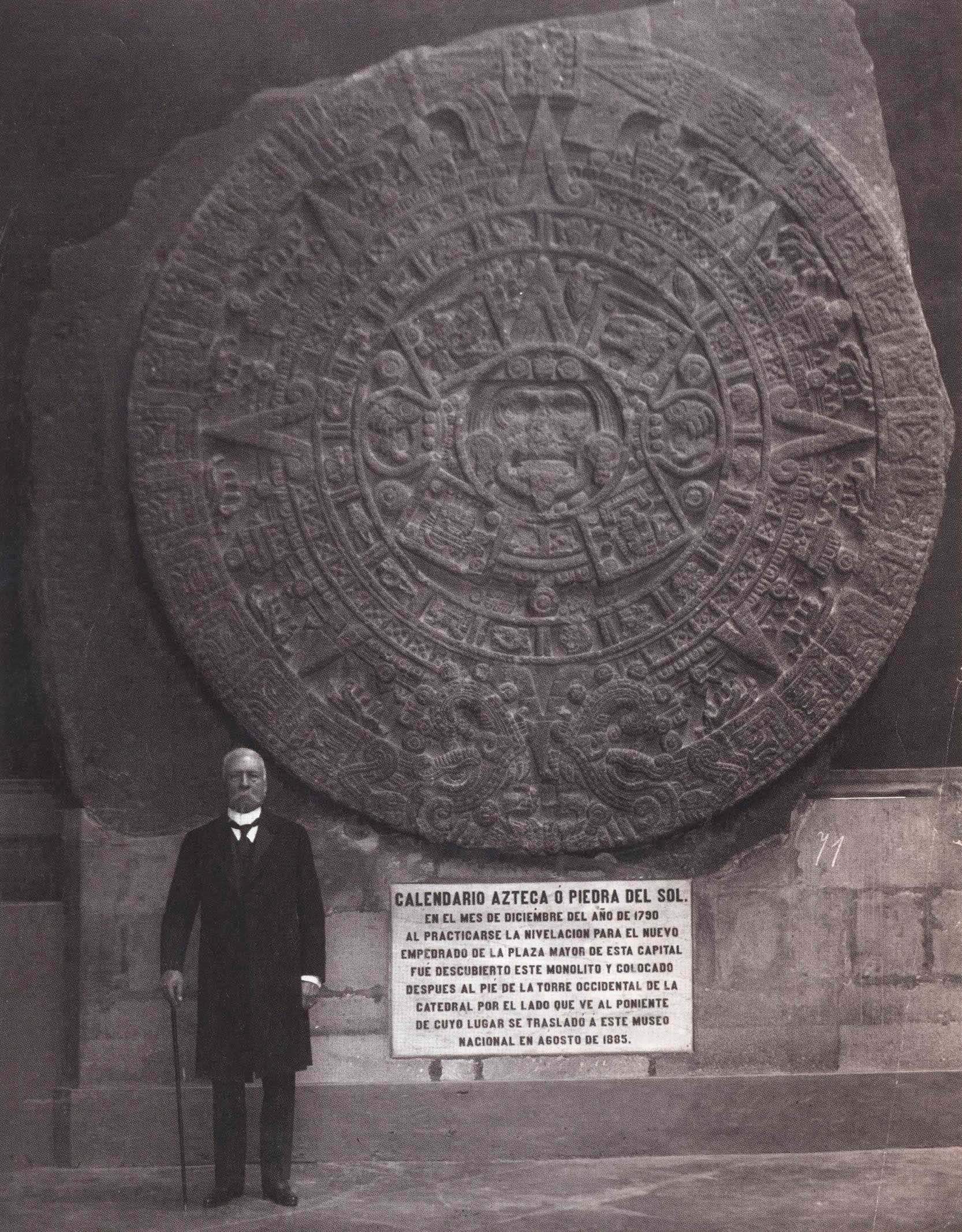
Porfirio Díaz in 1910 at the National Museum of Anthropology with the Aztec Calendar Stone. The regime appropriated the indigenous past for patriotic and state purposes, including promoting tourism

When Cárdenas was governor of his home state of Michoacan (1928–32) and later, when he was president of Mexico (1934–40) and beyond, he promoted tourism to Michoacan and particularly to the historic town of Pátzcuaro. He commissioned murals to show the importance of the region's history to the history of Mexico, promoted indigenous performance in music and dance, and actively had Michoacan advertised as a tourist destination.

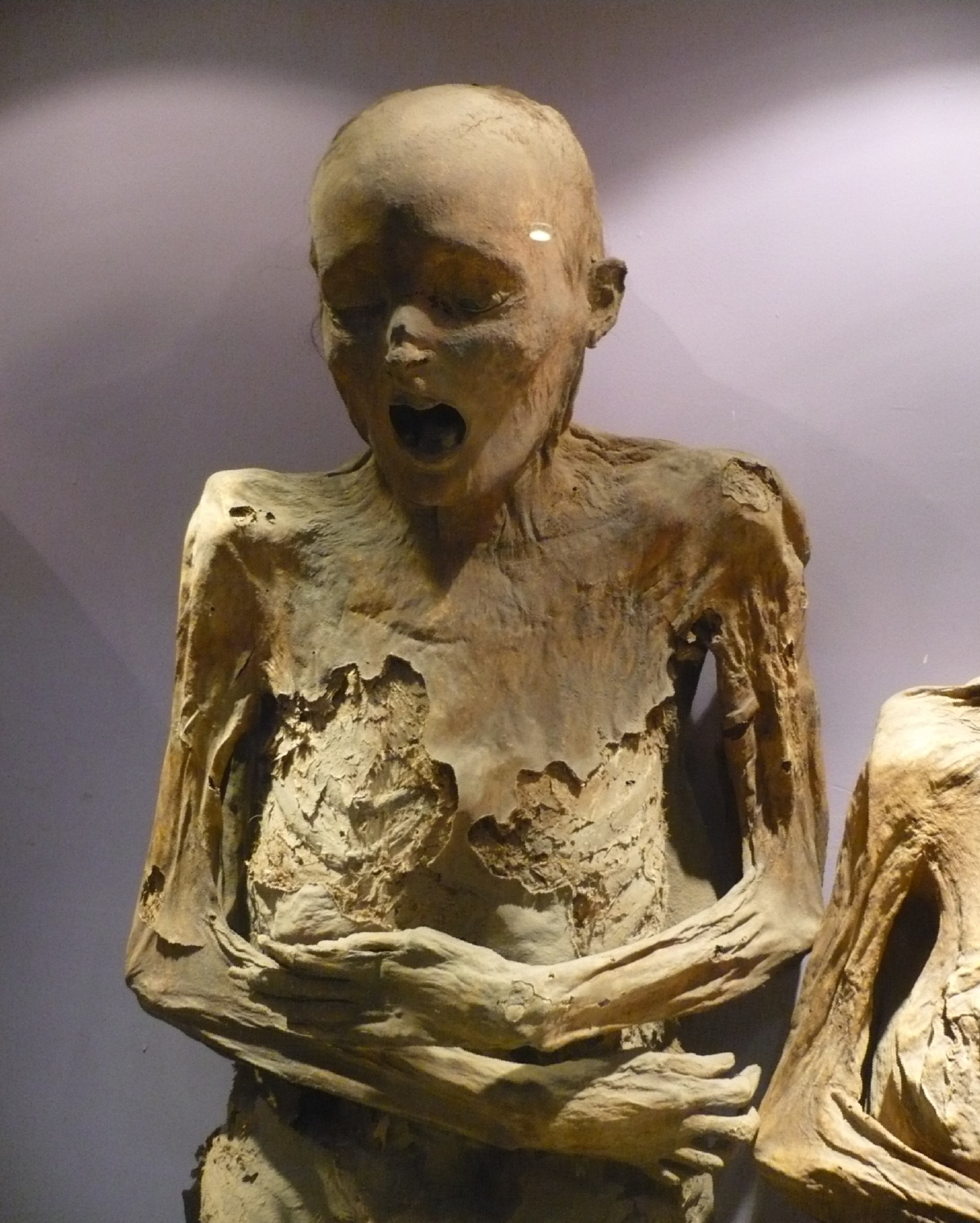
Mummies of Guanajuato

The Mexican government developed beach resorts in the 1940s and 1950s in Acapulco, under president Miguel Alemán, who in his post-presidency became Commissioner of Tourism. Other beach resorts on the Pacific coast were also developed, including Mazatlan, Puerto Vallarta and on the Baja California peninsula at Cabo San Lucas. Later on the Yucatan Peninsular the government promoted the development of Cancún. The importance of tourism in Mexico has seen its head having a cabinet-level position. Attracting tourists from the developed world spurred the construction of upscale hotels, particularly by U.S. hotel chains. San Miguel de Allende, Guanajuato developed as an artists' colony. Unlike beach resorts developed by the Mexican government, San Miguel was promoted to tourists by locals.

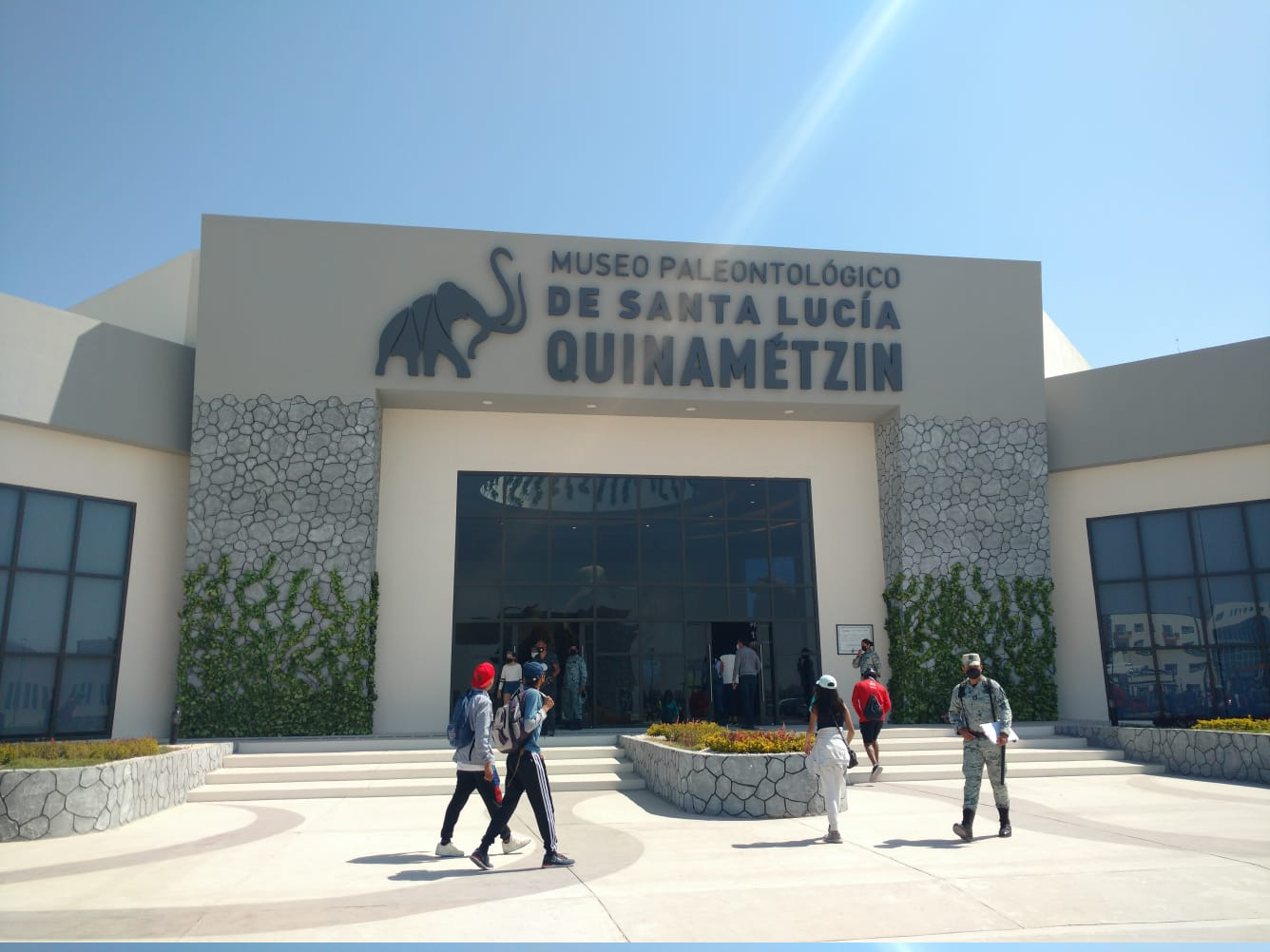
Mammoth central

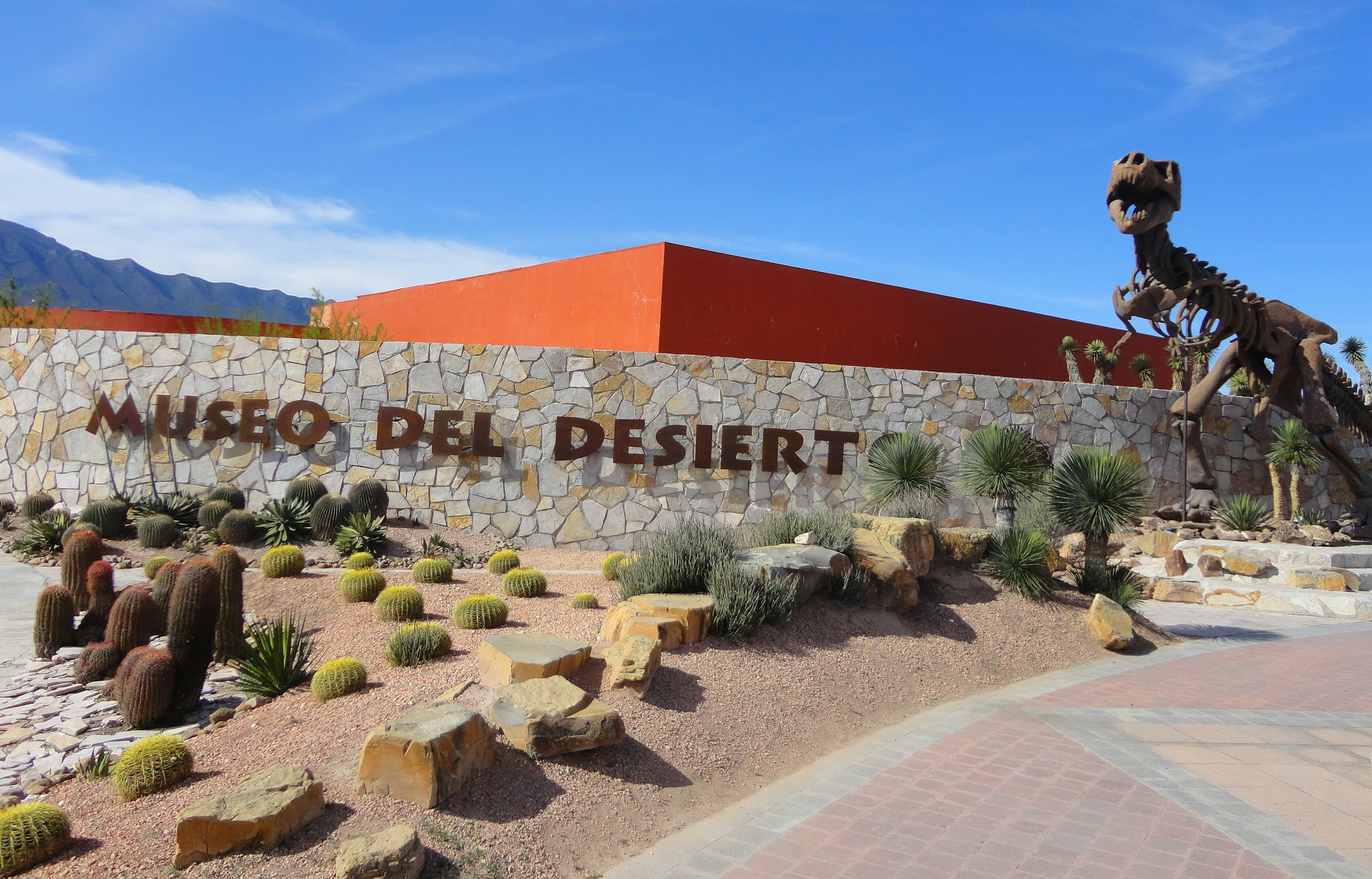
Museo del Desierto

Starting in the late twentieth century, Mexico has been alert to international venues to both protect tourist destinations such as archeological sites, colonial cities, and natural wonders listed as UNESCO World Heritage Sites. With the inauguration of the UNESCO Intangible Cultural Heritage program, Mexico has certified the cultural importance of Days of the Dead (2003), Mexican cuisine (2010), mariachi music (2011), and charrería (2016), among others. Private philanthropy has played an important role in the preservation and restoration of a number of Mexican sites, most prominently by entrepreneur Carlos Slim, whose Foundation for the Historic Center of the City of Mexico (Fundación del Centro Histórico de la Ciudad de México) has made a significant difference in the historic core of the capital, including security concerns.

Violence and political turmoil in Mexico has been a problem which affects travel and tourism. The years of the Porfirio Díaz regime (1876-1911) saw a decrease in violence and the rise of tourism. The Mexican Revolution 1910-20 was a major civil war, but following that the Mexican government achieved a level internal security that saw the rise of tourism and cultural exchanges in the 1920s and 1930s. In recent years, with the drug war in Mexico, U.S. State Department travel advisories have alerted tourists to the dangers of certain areas of the country.

== Statistics ==
The primary nations from which tourists embark on journeys to Mexico, manifesting a notable proportion of air arrivals, include the United States, Canada, and various European countries.

Rank	Country	2016	2017
1	United States	9,417,601	10,340,463
2	Canada	1,781,469	1,985,084
3	France	833,901	860,821
4	United Kingdom	545,055	563,099
5	Colombia	439,689	485,371
6	Argentina	405,959	474,248
7	Spain	361,498	377,349
8	Brazil	307,439	376,520
9	Germany	255,940	277,352
10	Peru	182,042	212,613
Total		35,189,529	39,890,442

Yearly tourist arrivals in millions

== Local effects ==
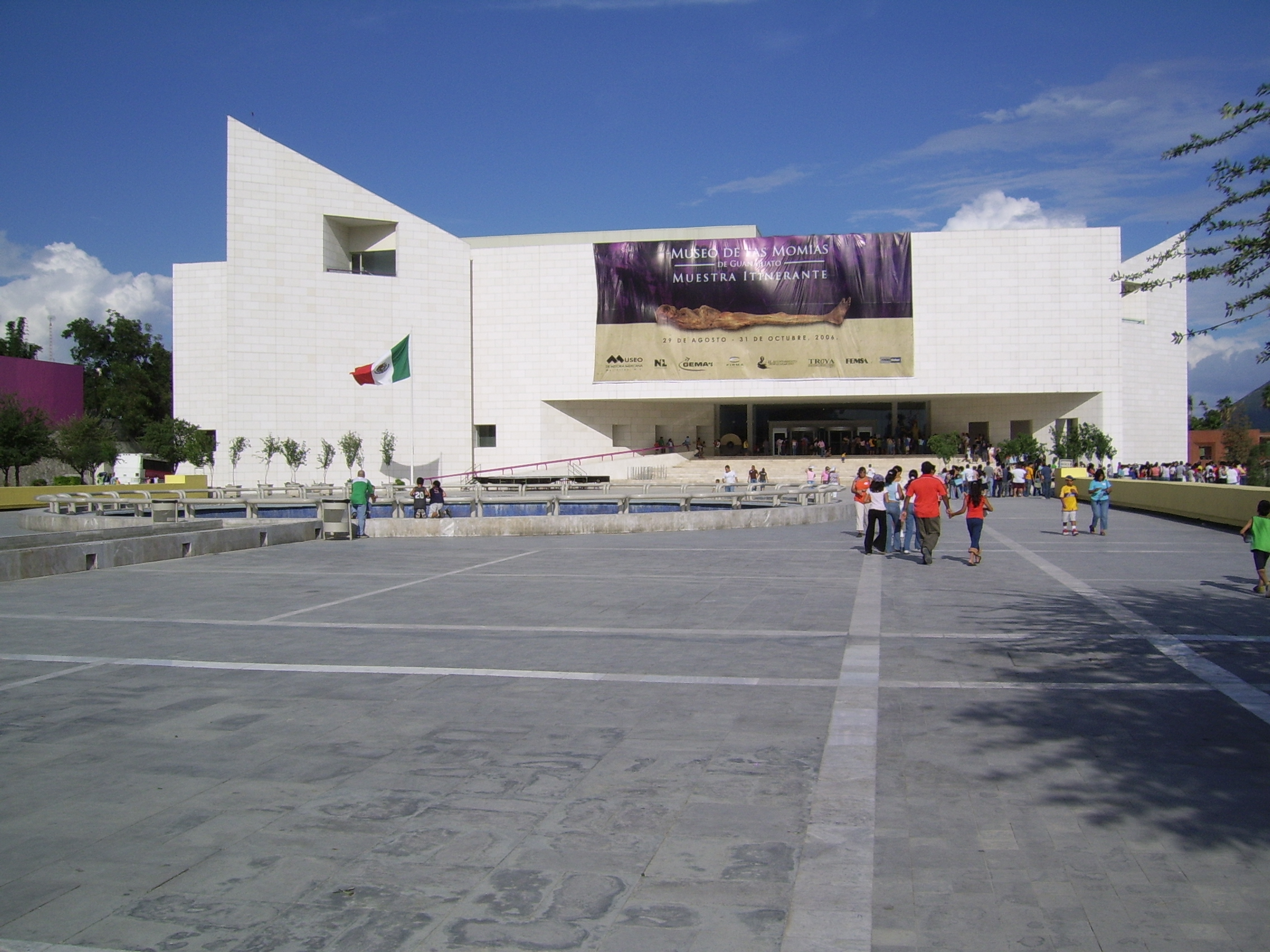
Museo de Historia Mexicana (Museum of Mexican History)

=== Economic effects ===
The Mexican government has often had a hand in the development of the country's tourist sector. One reason for this was, and still is, tourism's potential to improve the economy, as tourists spend money on accommodations, recreation, food and souvenirs. In the 1920s, the government organized studies of the economy and tourism competitors, collaborated with private companies, and created a national tourism agency in order to capitalize on the economic potential of tourists, especially those from the United States. The tourism industry in 2018 was about 8.7% of Mexico’s GDP and brought the country 215.5 billion Mexican pesos (or 10.8 billion U.S. dollars) in export earnings. More recently, according to national statistics, by 2023 the tourism GDP reached 2,582,001 million Mexican pesos, which represented about 8.6% of the country's total GDP. That year, tourism activities supported around 2.8 million formal jobs, which is equivalent to 7.2% of all salaried employment in the country. In 2018, it also provided jobs for over 2.3 million people, which is 6% of the total employment in the nation.

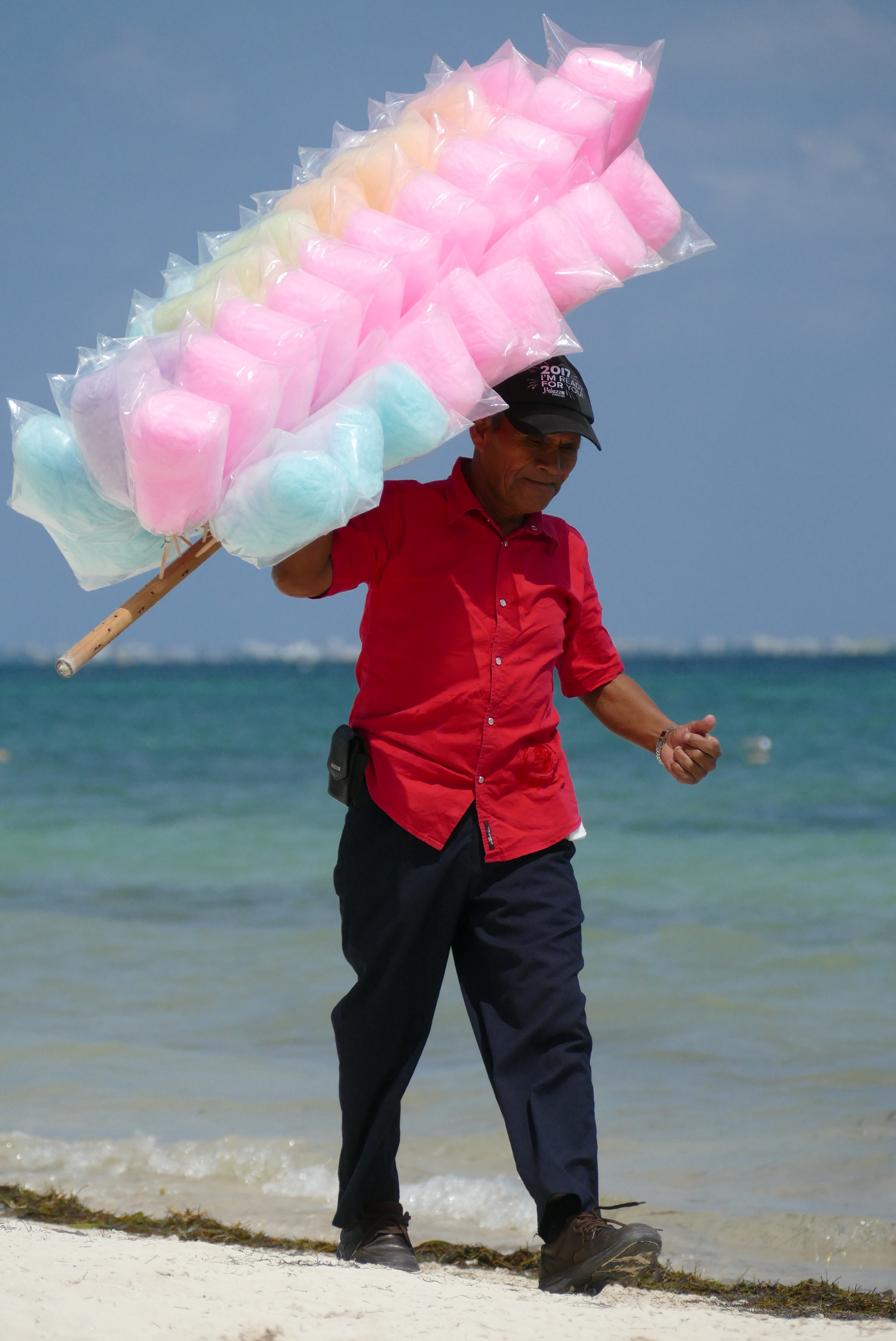
A man selling cotton candy to tourists on a beach in Cancún

In 2023, tourism in Mexico had seen a 4.4% increase in tourism related GDP compared with the year prior. As of June 2025, foreign-exchange income from tourism was reported to reach US$2.7 billion, which is a 5.7% increase since 2024.

=== Social effects ===
In the early 20th century, the development of tourism may have increased a sense of national unity and pride among Mexicans because promoting the industry required them to celebrate the unique environment, history and culture that make the country a desirable place to visit.

Much of the tourist economy is focused on large tourist centers and resort areas, some of which were set up by the government itself, such as Cancún in 1970. People from around Mexico migrate to these centers in search of employment. In many cases, the available jobs have allowed women to gain more economic independence. In other instances, where migrants leave their families to find work outside their towns, the move can disrupt family dynamics and other aspects of life back home, despite an increased income.

In places like Cancún, low-wage workers often live in cities outside of the tourist hotspot, in conditions far from that of the resorts and beaches enjoyed by foreign tourists. These people, who typically work in the service sector or construction, often don't make enough money to be able to access these beaches or participate in any of the recreational activities they make possible through their jobs. Additionally, migrant workers can feel pressure to change their language and their clothing styles to fit in with the more Americanized culture of the areas. However, not everyone working in the tourist industry has these same issues, such as those involved with ownership, investment, and even architecture and engineering.

=== Environmental effects ===
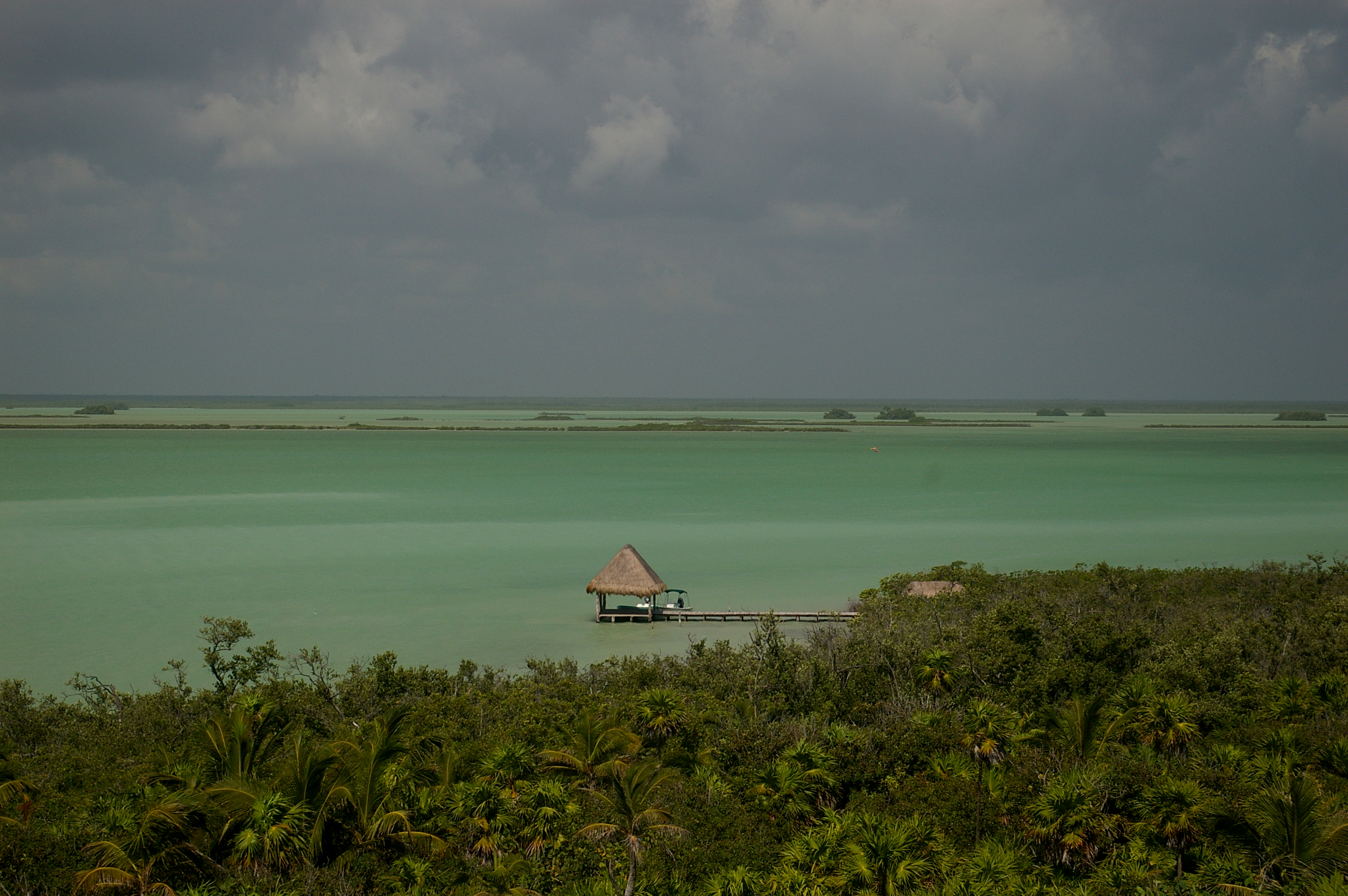
The Sian Ka'an Biosphere Reserve is a UNESCO World Heritage Site and protected because of its wide variety of plant and animal life.

The large-scale development of large resorts and other tourist attractions can be detrimental to the environment, as it threatens ecosystems and their biodiversity. As ecotourism becomes more popular and more tourists seek out environmentally friendly experiences in nature, the Mexican government has formulated plans to create a more sustainable industry. One common method of protecting ecosystems that is used by some NGOs and other organizations is designating protected areas. However, creating these can come at the cost of native people's wellbeing, as it sometimes pushes them out of land they have lived off of for generations and eliminates resources previously shared by local communities.

=== Rural areas ===
In less populated rural areas, tourism and its impacts take a different shape than in large resort areas. A 2021 study done in Tlaxcala, Mexico, where religious and archaeological tourism have become popular, showed that locals have mixed opinions. 64.5% of people interviewed said that the impact of tourism was positive, and 31.5% said it was "moderately positive," due to economic growth, better transportation and improved public services. Others, however, voiced concerns about traffic, disruptive street vendors catering to tourists, and an increased cost of living. Many people in this area work in the industry, at hotels, restaurants, shops, and archeological sites.

== Regions ==
=== Central Mexico ===
==== Mexico City ====
Mexico City is the capital of Mexico, and its most important city. The historic center of Mexico City is designated a UNESCO World Heritage Site, with ancient archeological ruins, numerous colonial-era churches, most importantly the Cathedral, and the former palace of the Viceroy of New Spain, now the National Palace. The cathedral and National Palace are both located on the main plaza, known as the Zocalo. The city has museums of many types, housing cultural treasures of Mexico's history since ancient times to the modern era. One guide rates the National Museum of Anthropology as the top place to visit in Mexico City, located in Chapultepec Park, itself a top tourist attraction for foreign visitors and Mexico City residents. Other museums worth a visit are the Museo de Arte Moderno, the Museo Dolores Olmedo, the Franz Mayer Museum, the Frida Kahlo Museum, the Museo Rufino Tamayo, the archeological museum of the Templo Mayor, adjacent to the National Palace and cathedral; and the Museo Nacional de Historia in Chapultepec Castle, the former residence of viceroys of Mexico, Emperor Maximilian I, and presidents of Mexico until the early twentieth century.

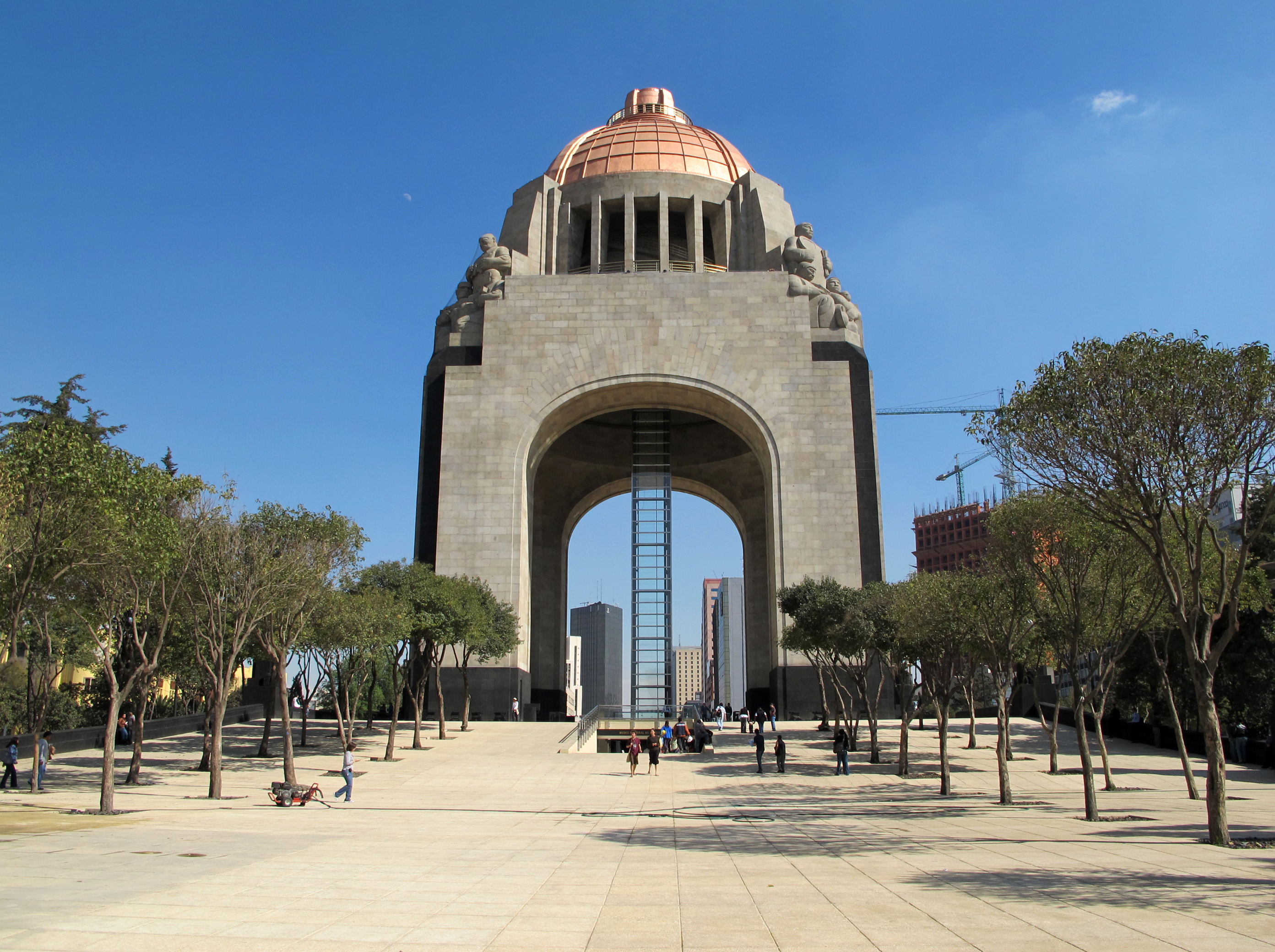
Monument to the Mexican Revolution, Mexico City. The remains of a number of Mexican leaders of the Revolution are buried there. A museum to the Revolution is underneath the monument.

===== Gallery =====
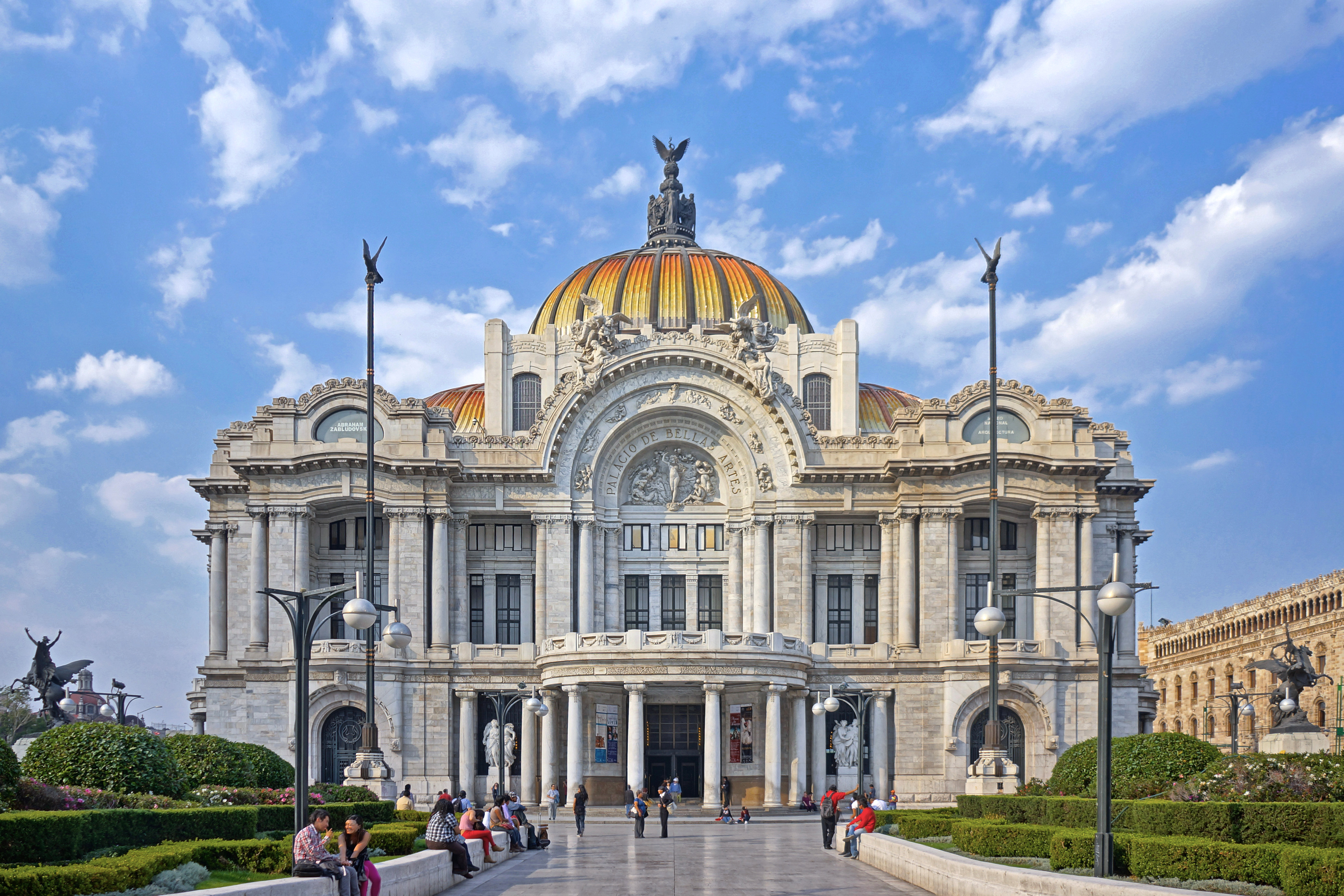
Palacio de Bellas Artes, construction started under Porfirio Díaz and stalled during the Mexican Revolution

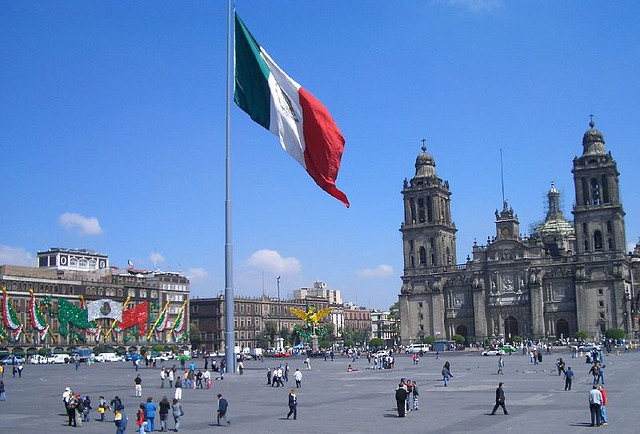
Metropolitan Cathedral of Mexico City

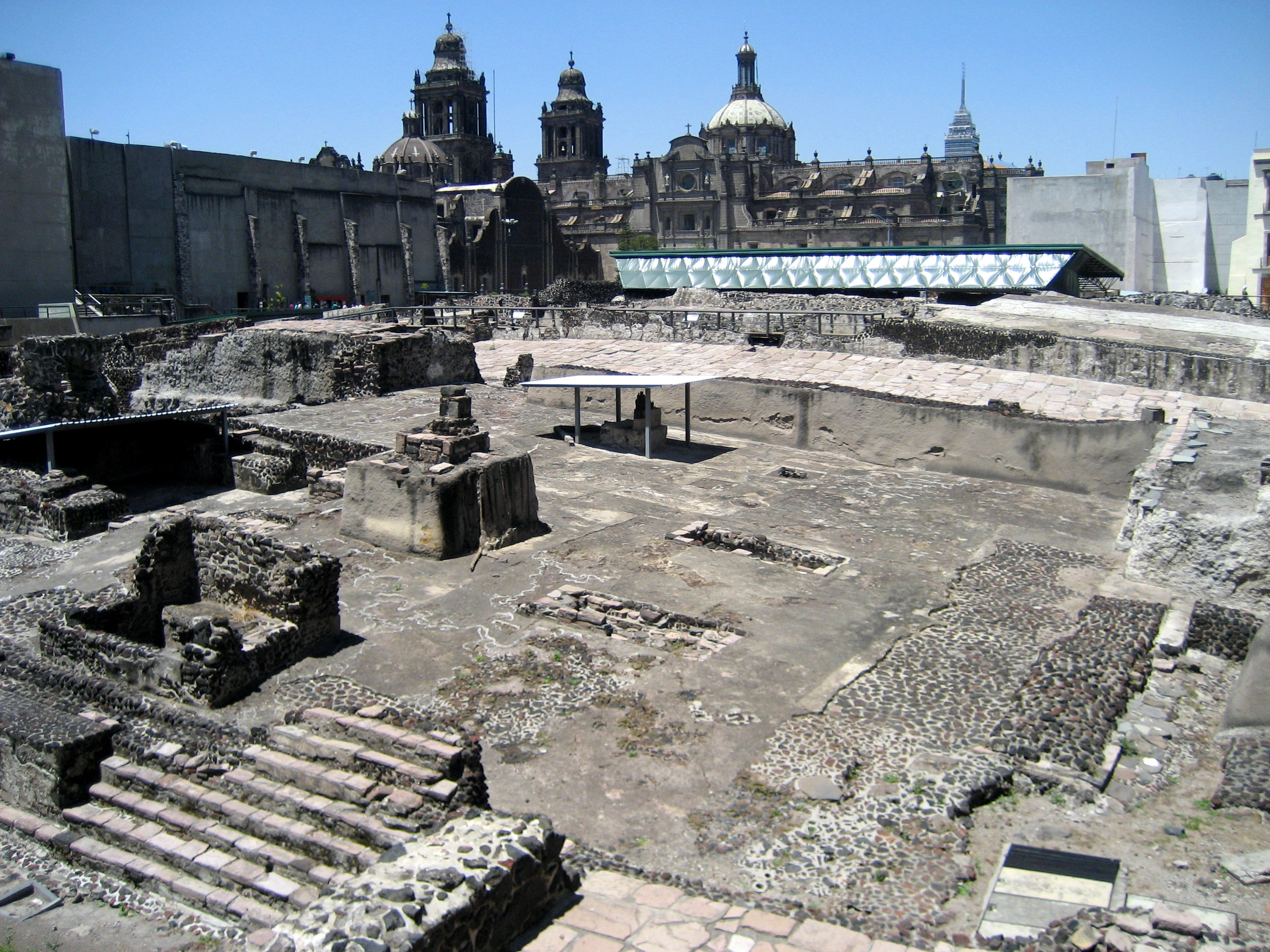
Aztec ruins of the Templo Mayor adjacent to the cathedral

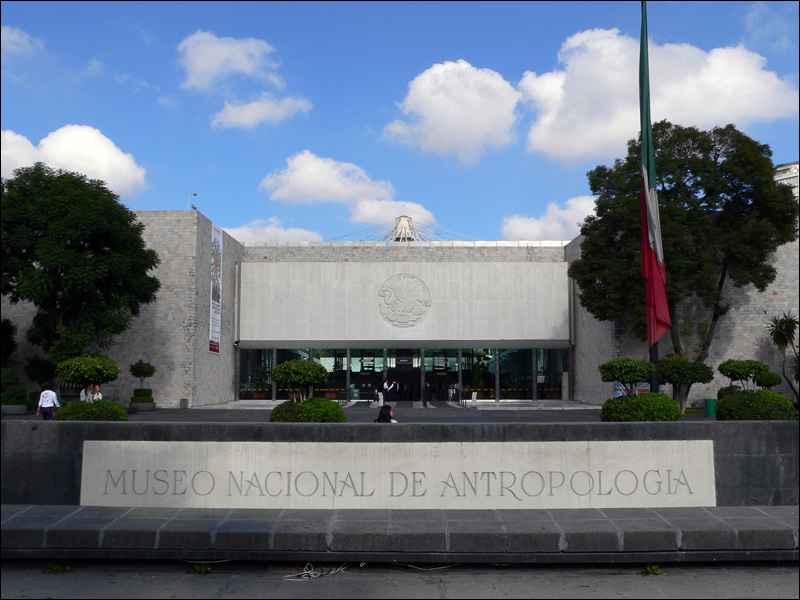
Museum of Anthropology in Chapultepec Park

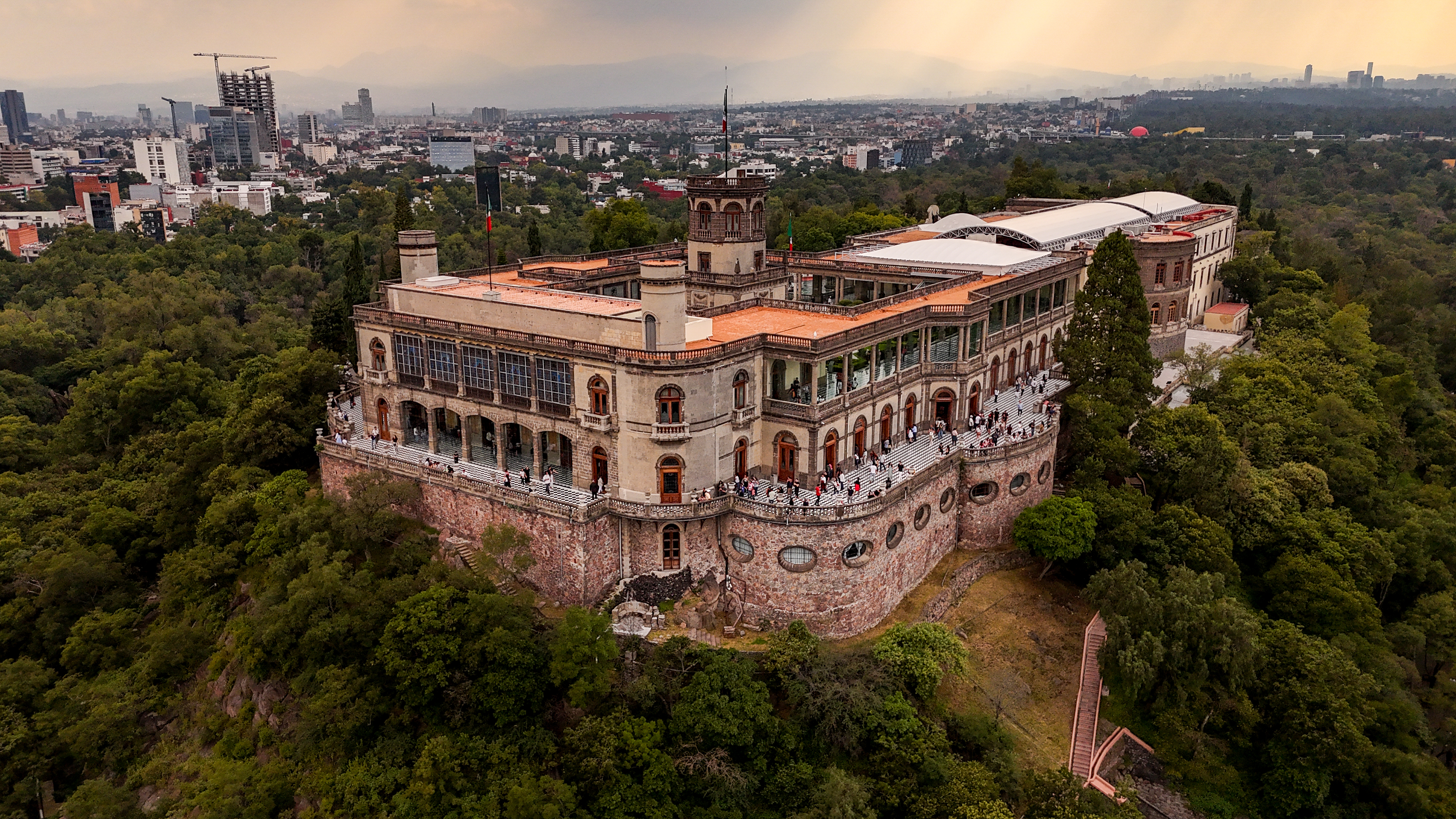
Chapultepec Castle, Mexico City

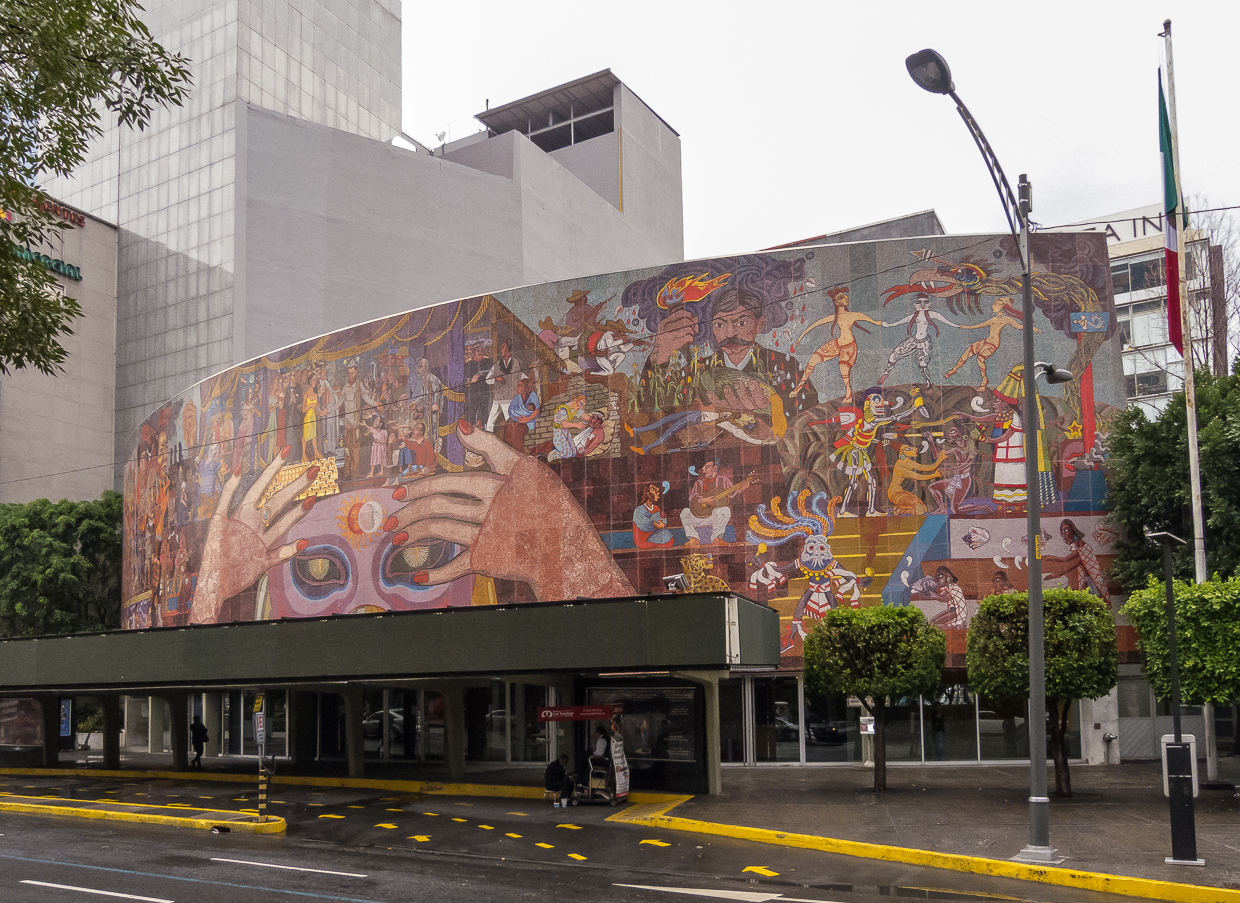
Teatro de los Insurgentes (Theater of the Insurgents)

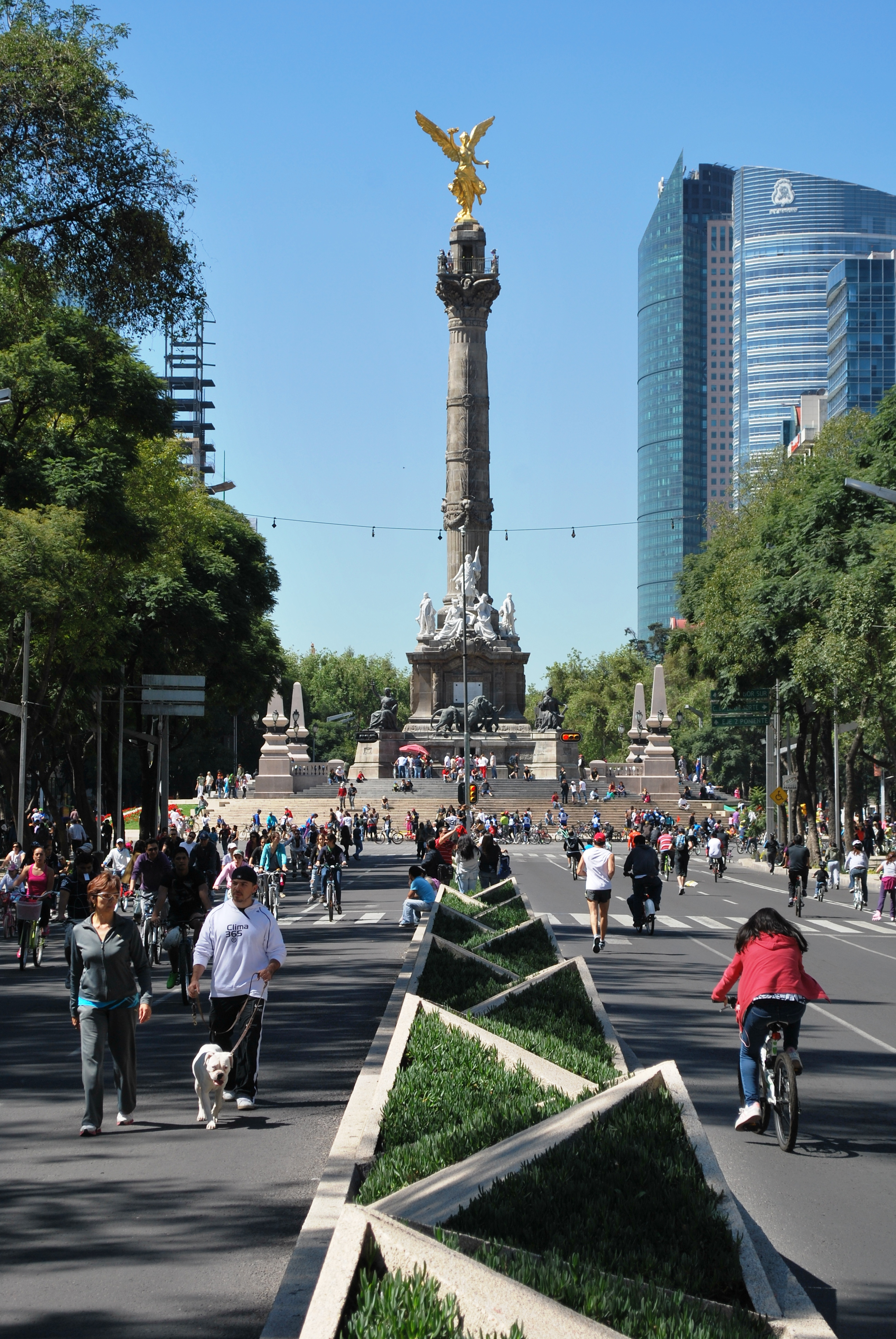
The Angel, a monument to Mexican independence

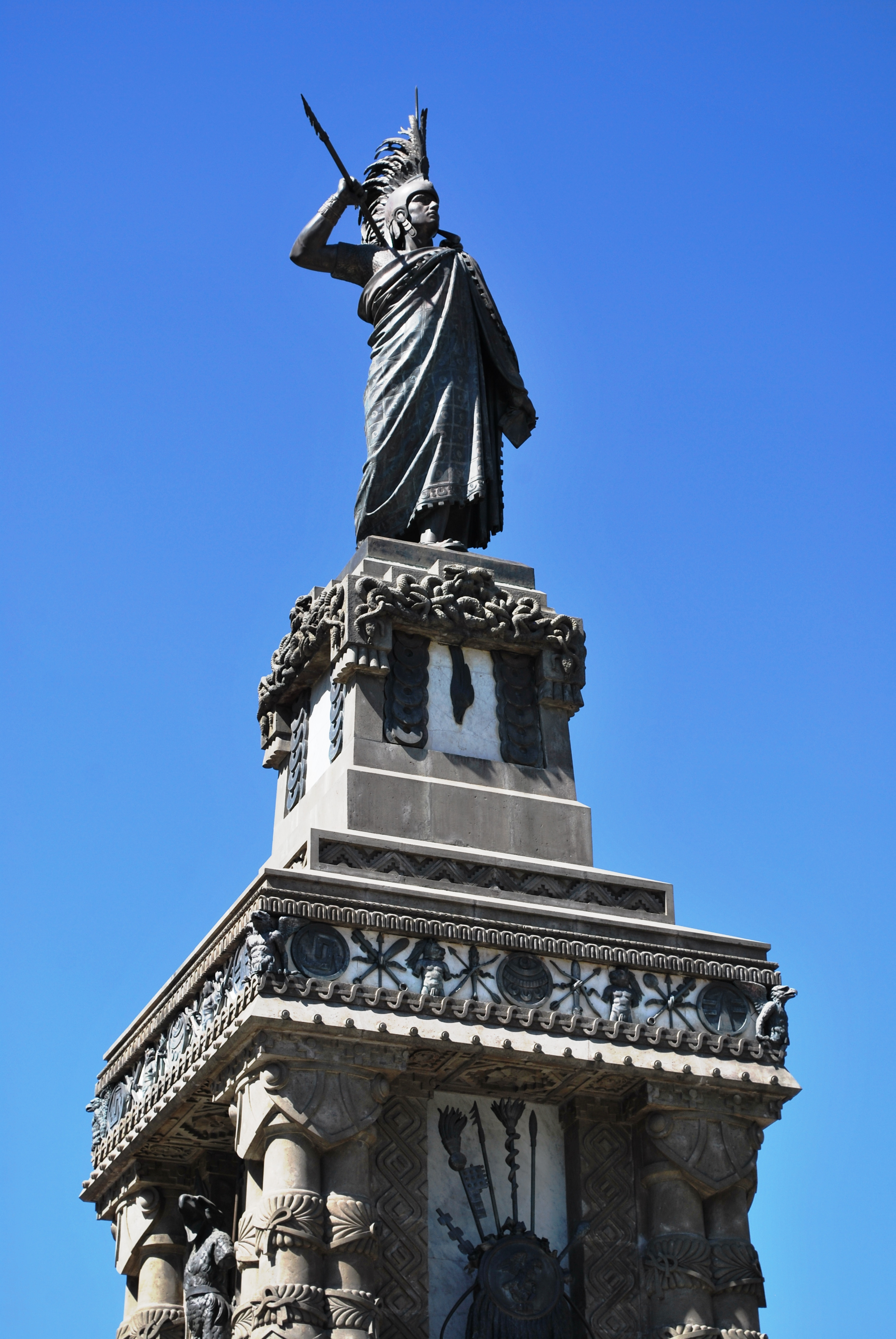
Monument to Cuauhtémoc erected during the Porfiriato

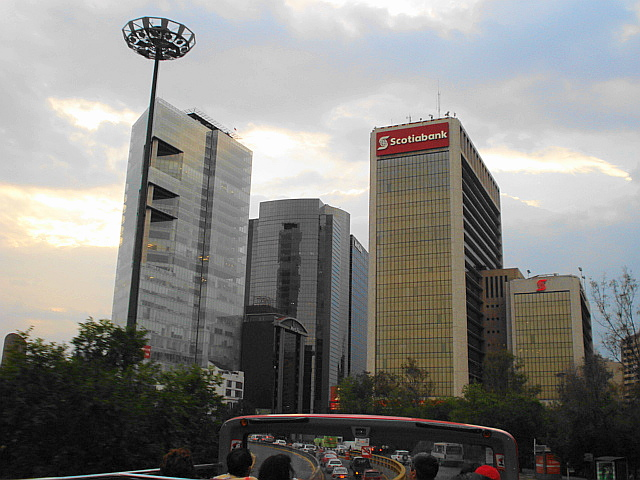
Polanco has one of the most expensive streets in the Americas Avenida Presidente Masaryk.

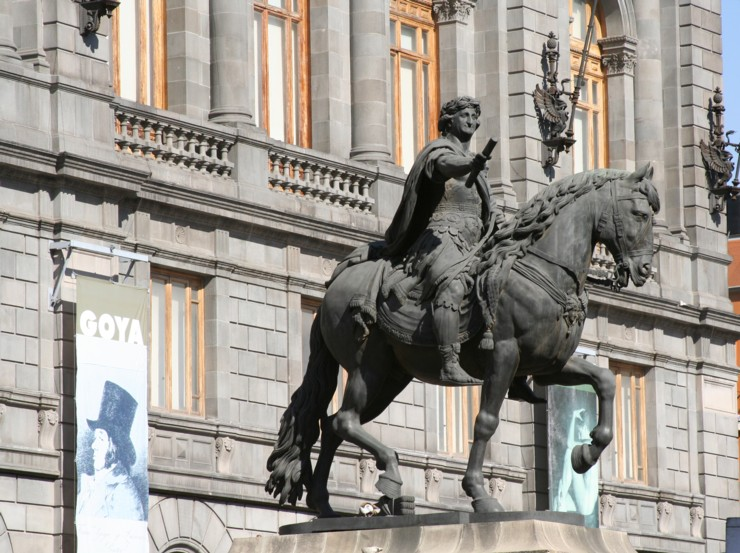
El Caballito, equestrian sculpture of King Charles IV of Spain by Manuel Tolsá on the back the Museo Nacional de Arte (National Museum of Art)

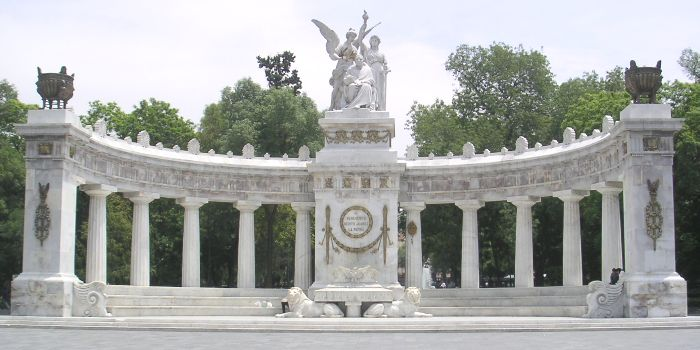
Benito Juárez Hemicycle, Alameda Central inaugurated 1910

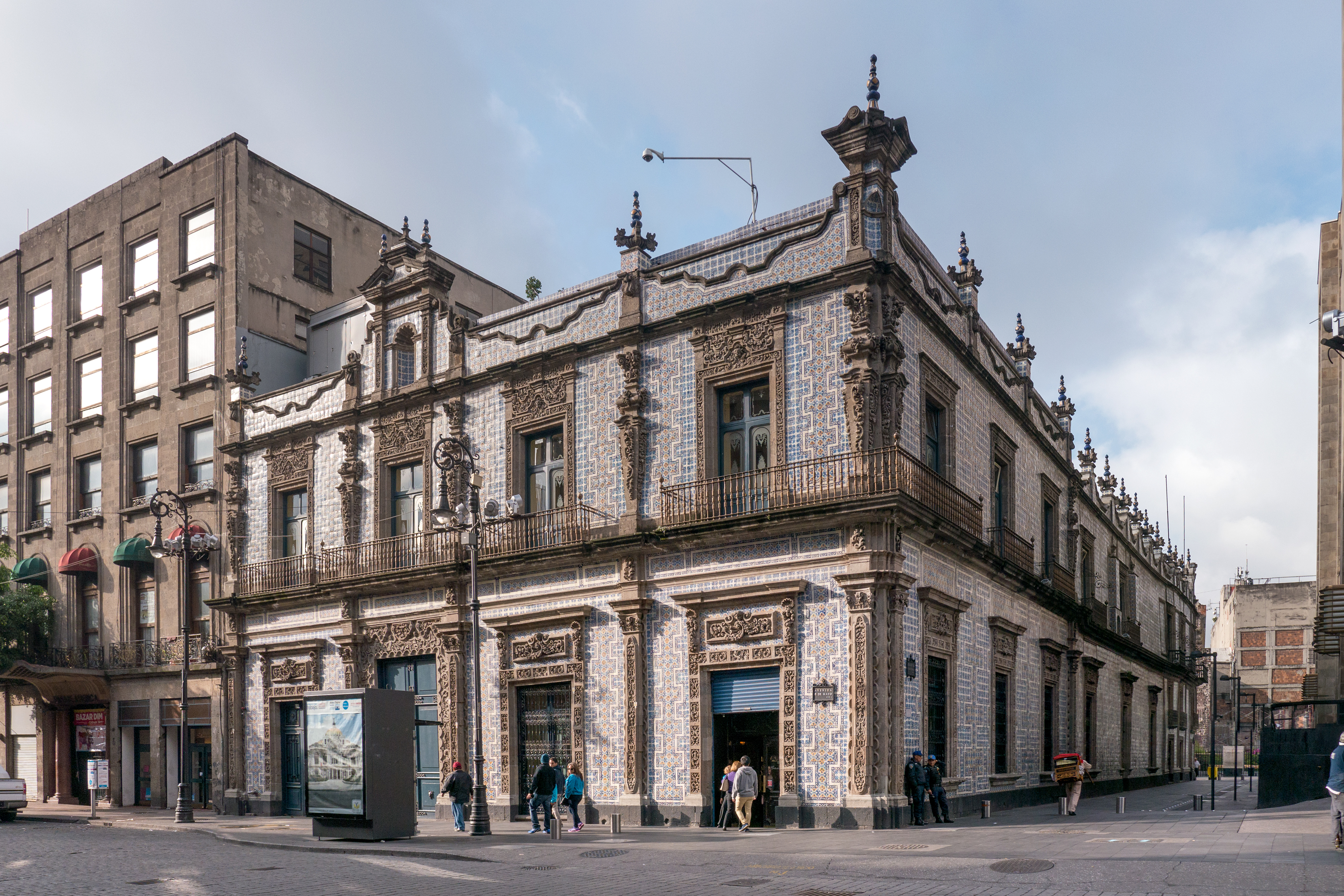
The Casa de los Azulejos, built 1737

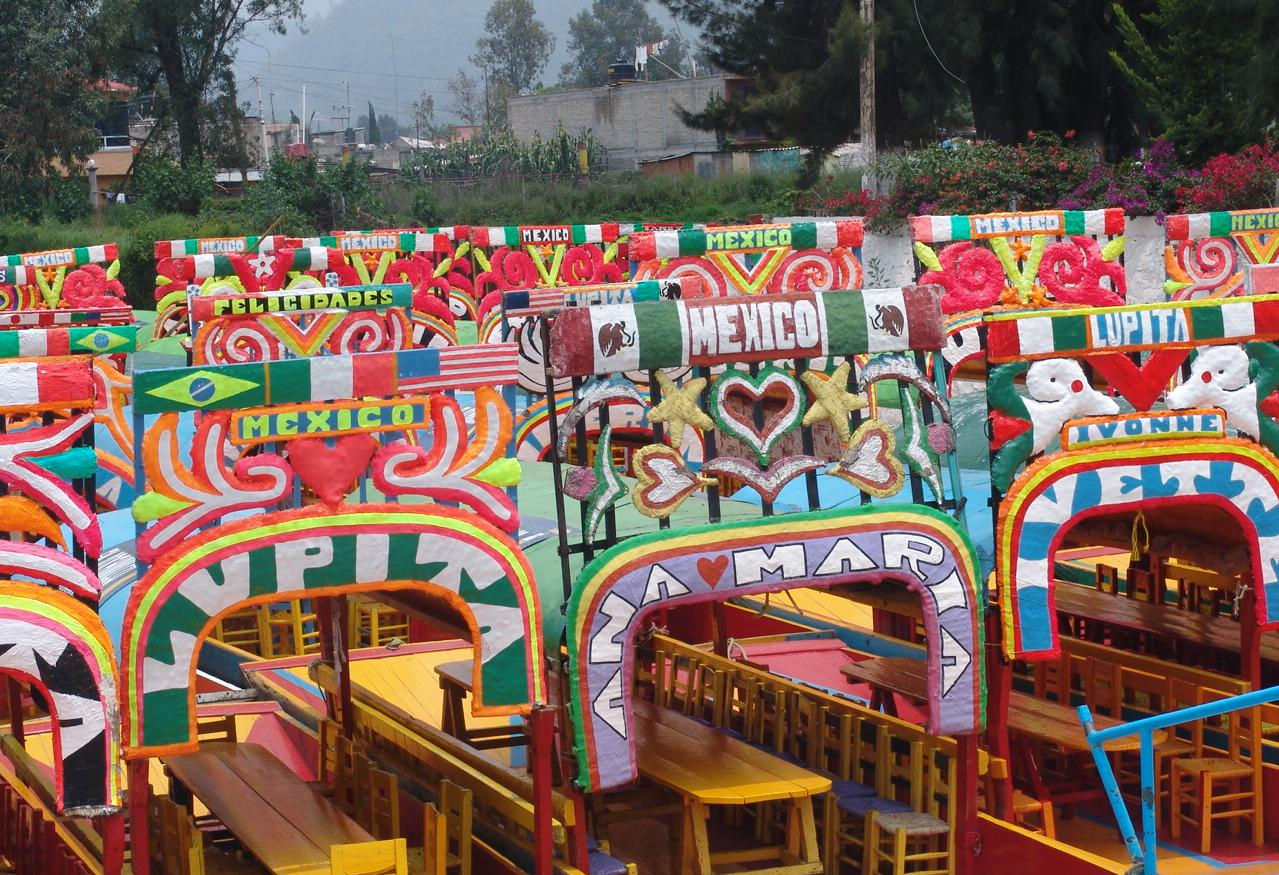
Trajinera boats at the floating gardens of Xochimilco in Mexico City

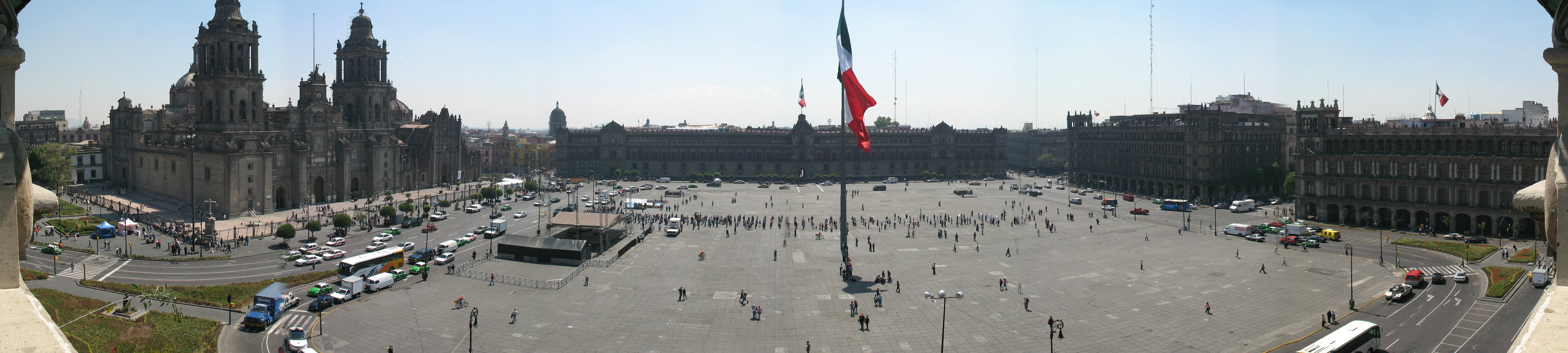
Panoramic view of the Zócalo (Plaza de la Constitución), Mexico City.

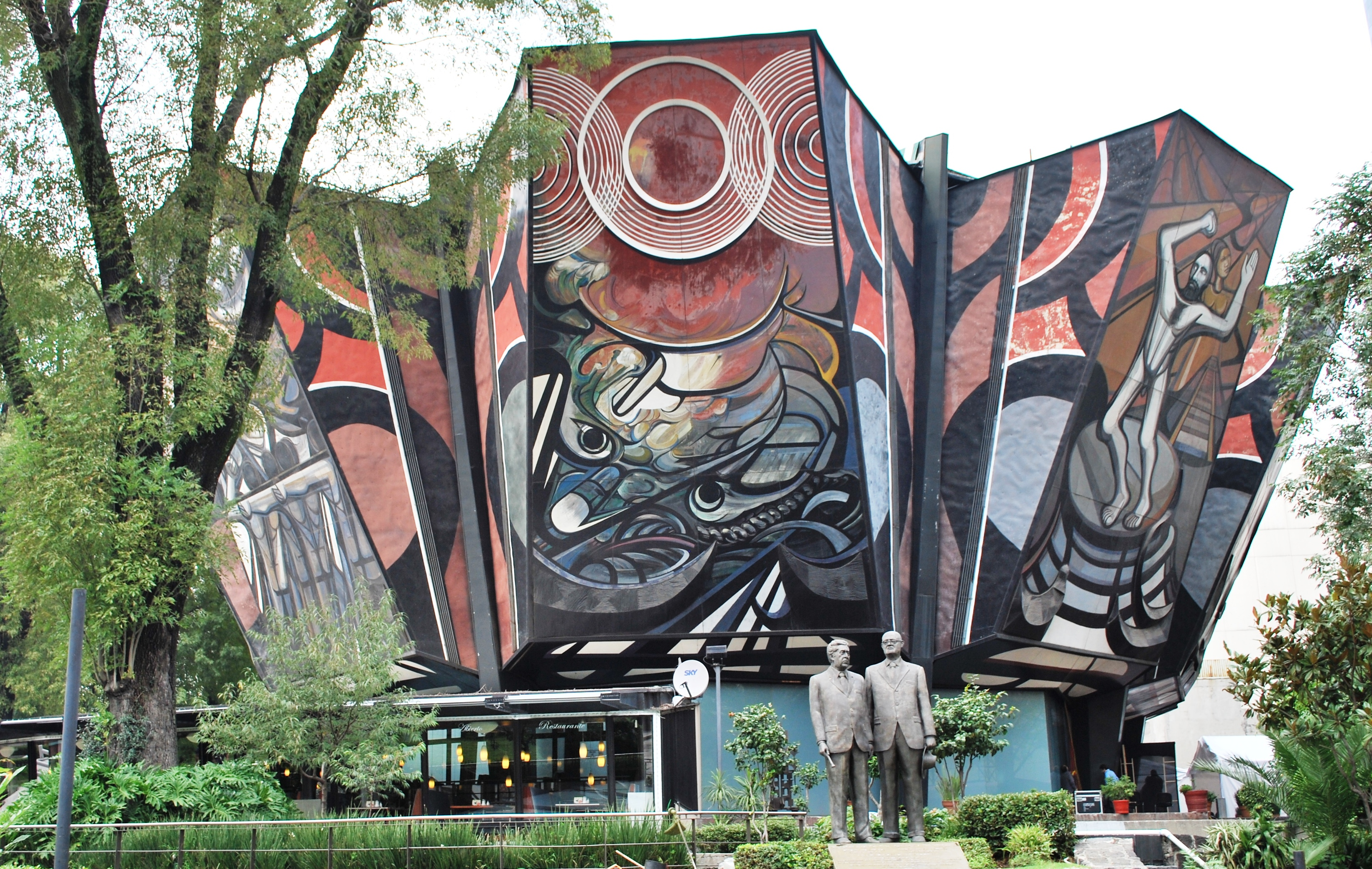
Polyforum Cultural Siqueiros

==== Morelos ====
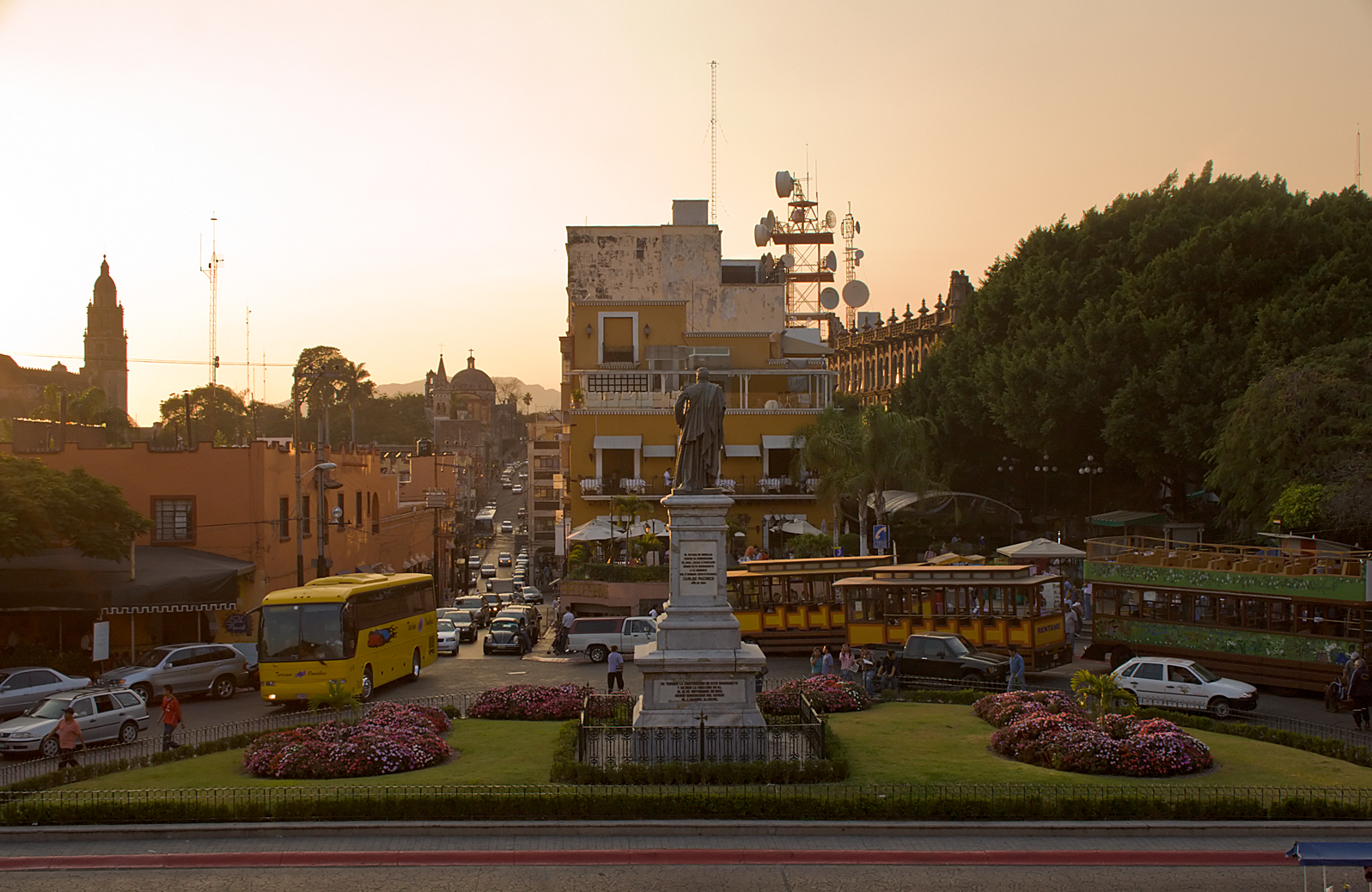
Cuernavaca city

Just south of Mexico City is the state of Morelos. Its capital, Cuernavaca, is nicknamed The City of Eternal Spring; its year-round benign climate attracts both national and international visitors. Top tourist attractions in Cuernavaca include the Palace of Cortés (16th-century home of the Conquistador, now a regional museum), the archeological site of Teopanzolco, and the Cuernavaca Cathedral. This latter is one of eleven Monasteries on the slopes of Popocatépetl in the state that are considered World Heritage Sites (three others are in the State of Puebla.

Just east of Cuernavaca are the Pueblos Magicos (Magic Towns) of Tepoztlan and Tlayacapan, each with its 16th-century monastery and colorful pre-Lenten carnival. Tepoztlan is also known for its Sunday Tianguis and the Sierra de Tepoztlan with its small pyramid and spectacular view.

Further east is the city of Cuautla, where an important battle took place in 1812 during the Mexican War of Independence. General Emiliano Zapata centered many of his revolutionary activities in and around Cuautla during the Mexican Revolution.

Morelos has a large number of water parks, ranging from small, rustic parks to international attractions. There are also several pre-hispanic pyramid sites, notably that of Xochicalco.

=== Southern Mexico ===
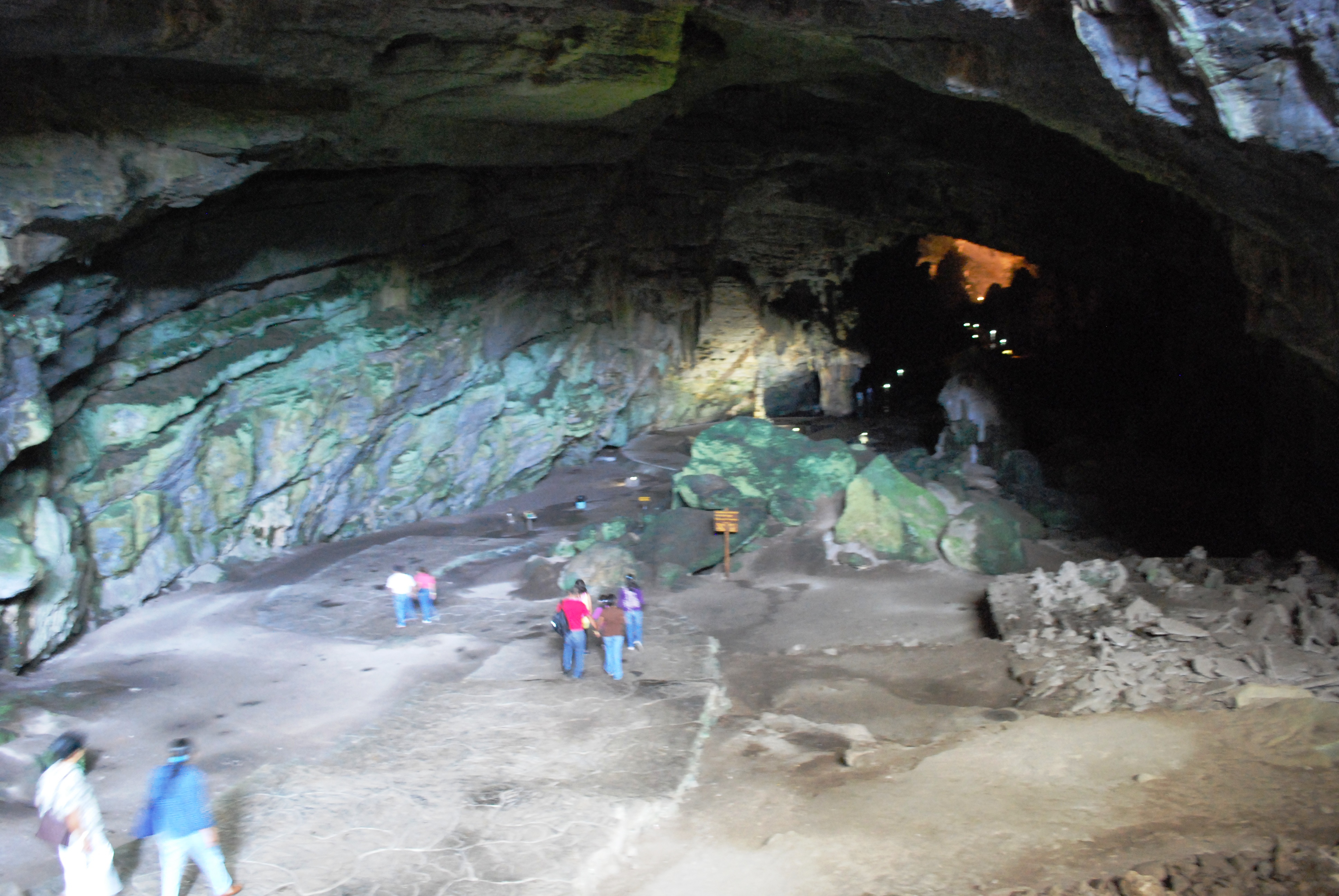
Entering the Cacahuamilpa Caves

Southern Mexico is the home of many surviving indigenous cultures and is a destination for many foreign and domestic tourists in Mexico. The dense indigenous populations in the prehispanic era saw the rise of civilizations, with enormous archeological sites indicating their complexity. The rugged terrain of southern Mexico and the lack of mineral wealth drawing large numbers of Spanish settlers in the colonial era and in the post-independence era has meant that southern Mexico remains highly indigenous in character.

=== Oaxaca ===
Oaxaca in central southern Mexico has remained highly indigenous into the modern era and the destination for tourists wishing to experience the various indigenous cultures there. The capital of the state is Oaxaca City, is where most tourists stay, after arrival by plane at the major airport. Tourists can use the capital as a base for day-trip excursions outside the capital to visit towns specializing in particular crafts, often sold in traditional local markets (tianguis). Craft-making towns include Santa María Atzompa,(pottery); San Bartolo Coyotepec, (black pottery); Ocotlán, Oaxaca (pottery); San Martín Tilcajete, fantastical carvings called (alebrijes); and Teotitlan del Valle, rugs. Oaxacan cuisine is notable, with ingredients, such as salted and dried grasshoppers (chapulines), and flavors that are regional.

Places worth visiting outside of the capital include the major archeological site of Monte Albán, as well as Mitla. There are numerous towns with markets and craft production.

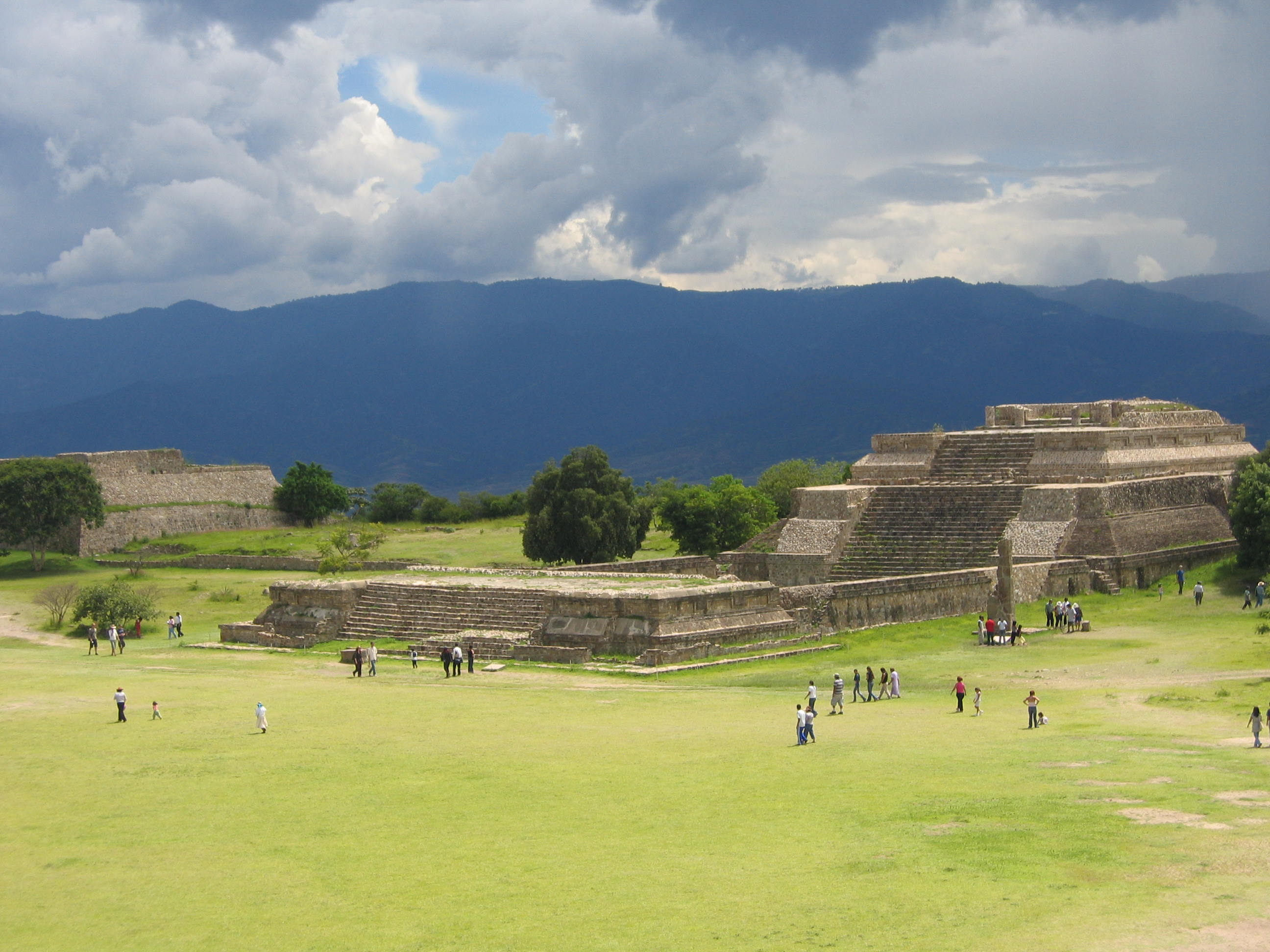
Monte Albán

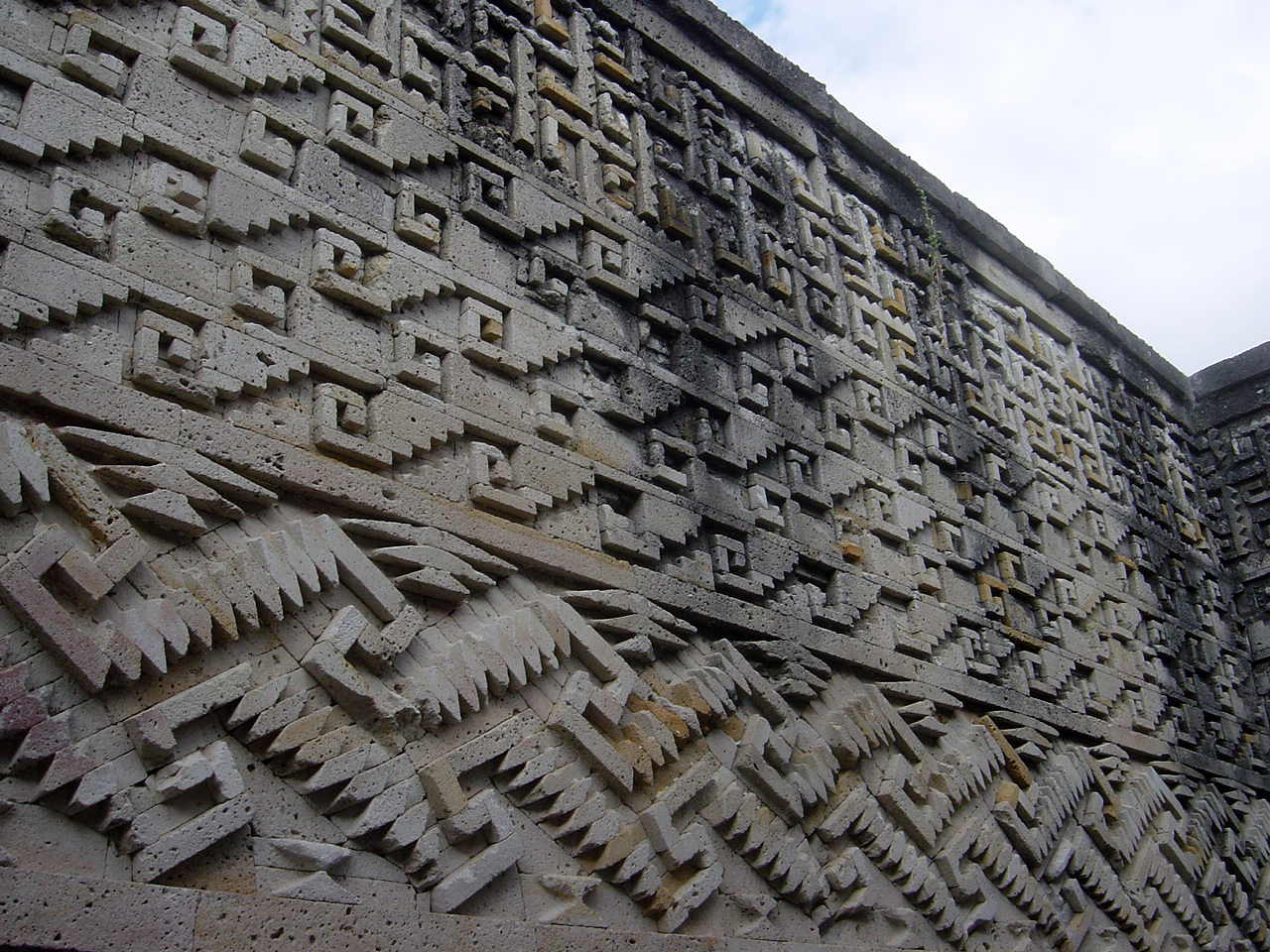
Mitla stone fretwork

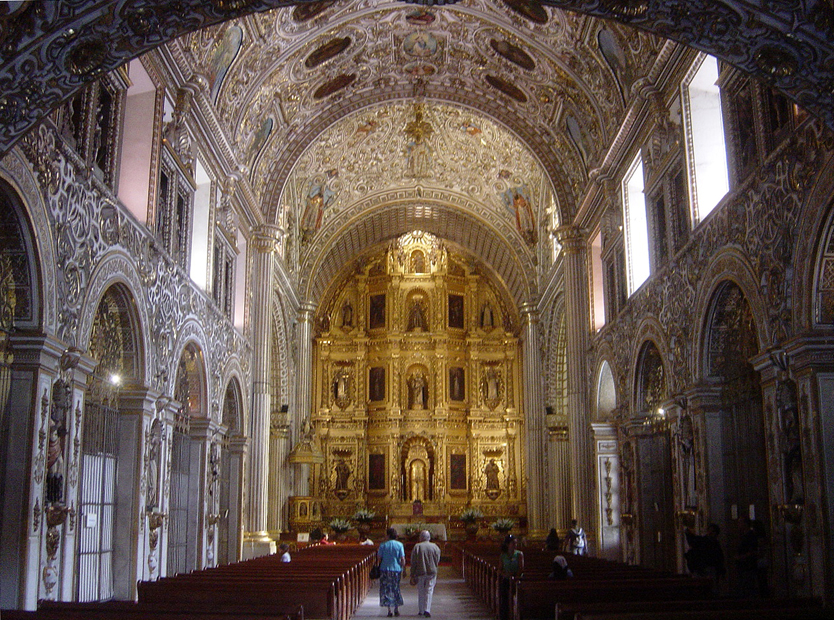
Church of Santo Domingo, Oaxaca City

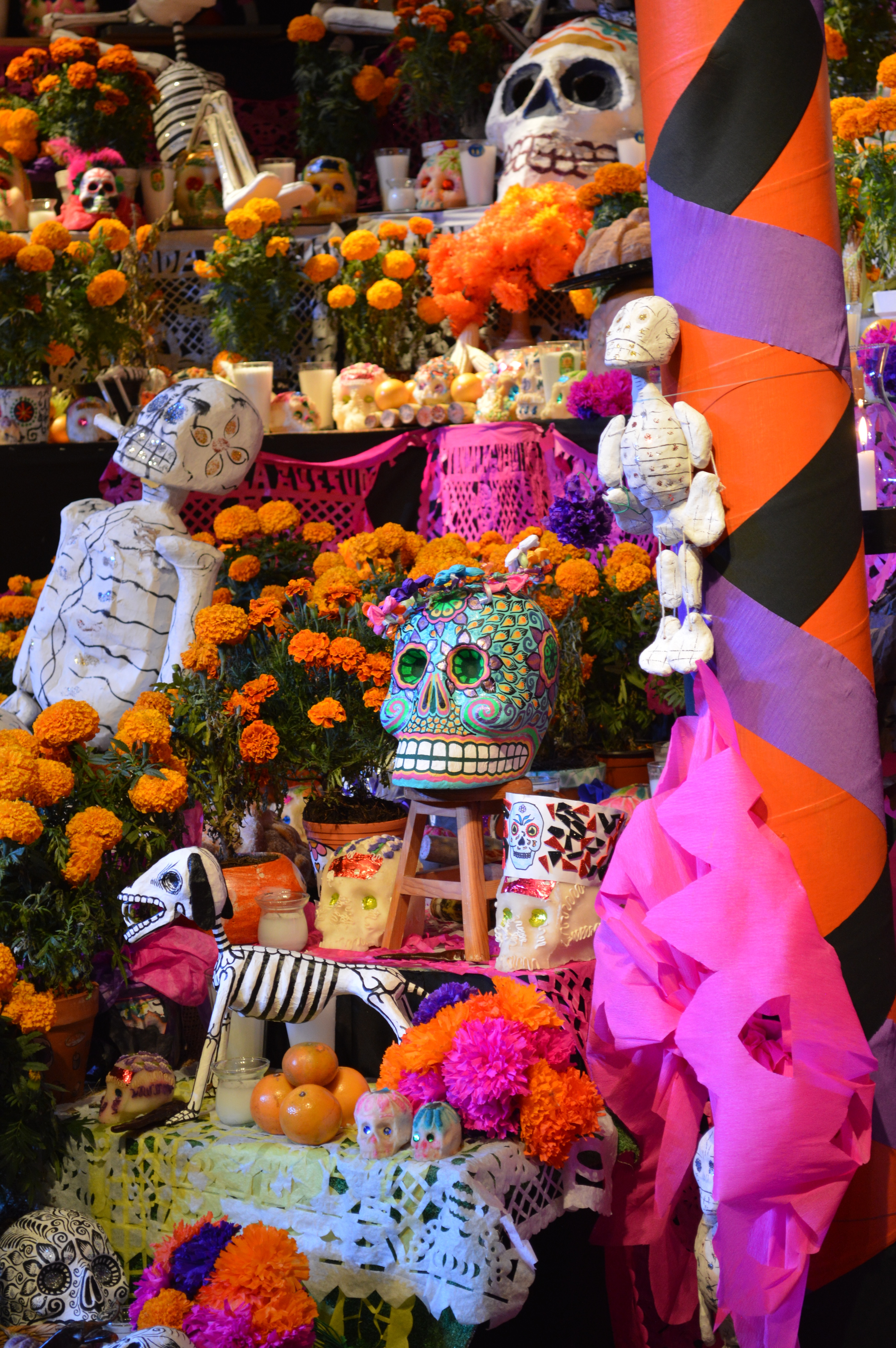
Day of the Dead decorations

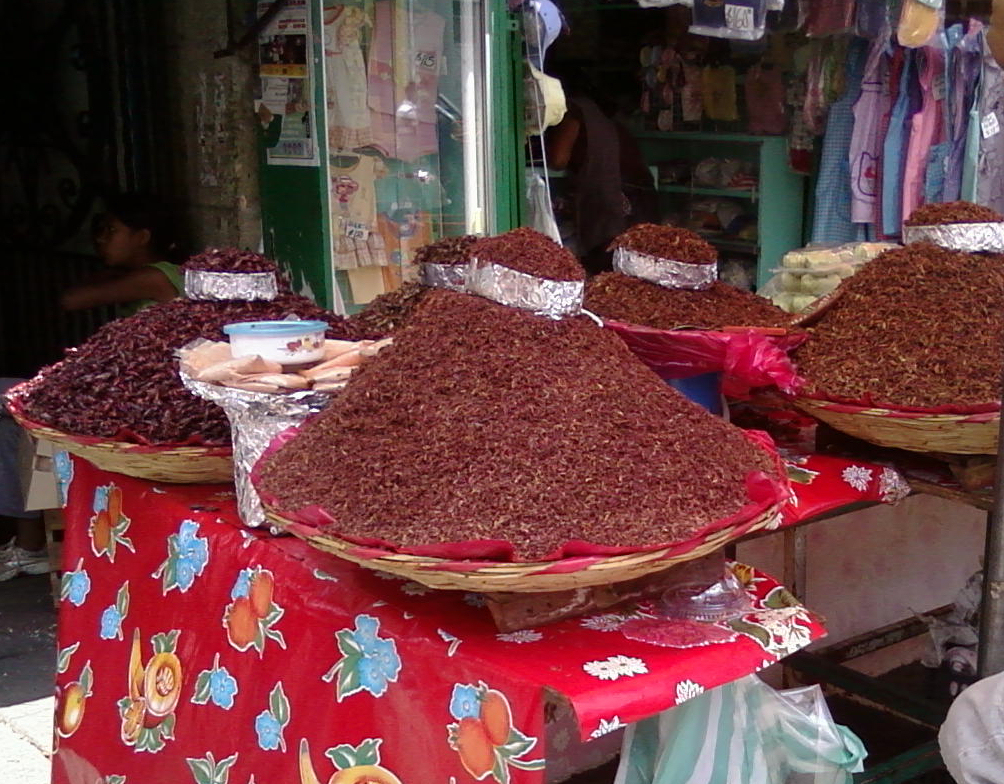
Chapulines (dried grasshoppers) for sale at a market

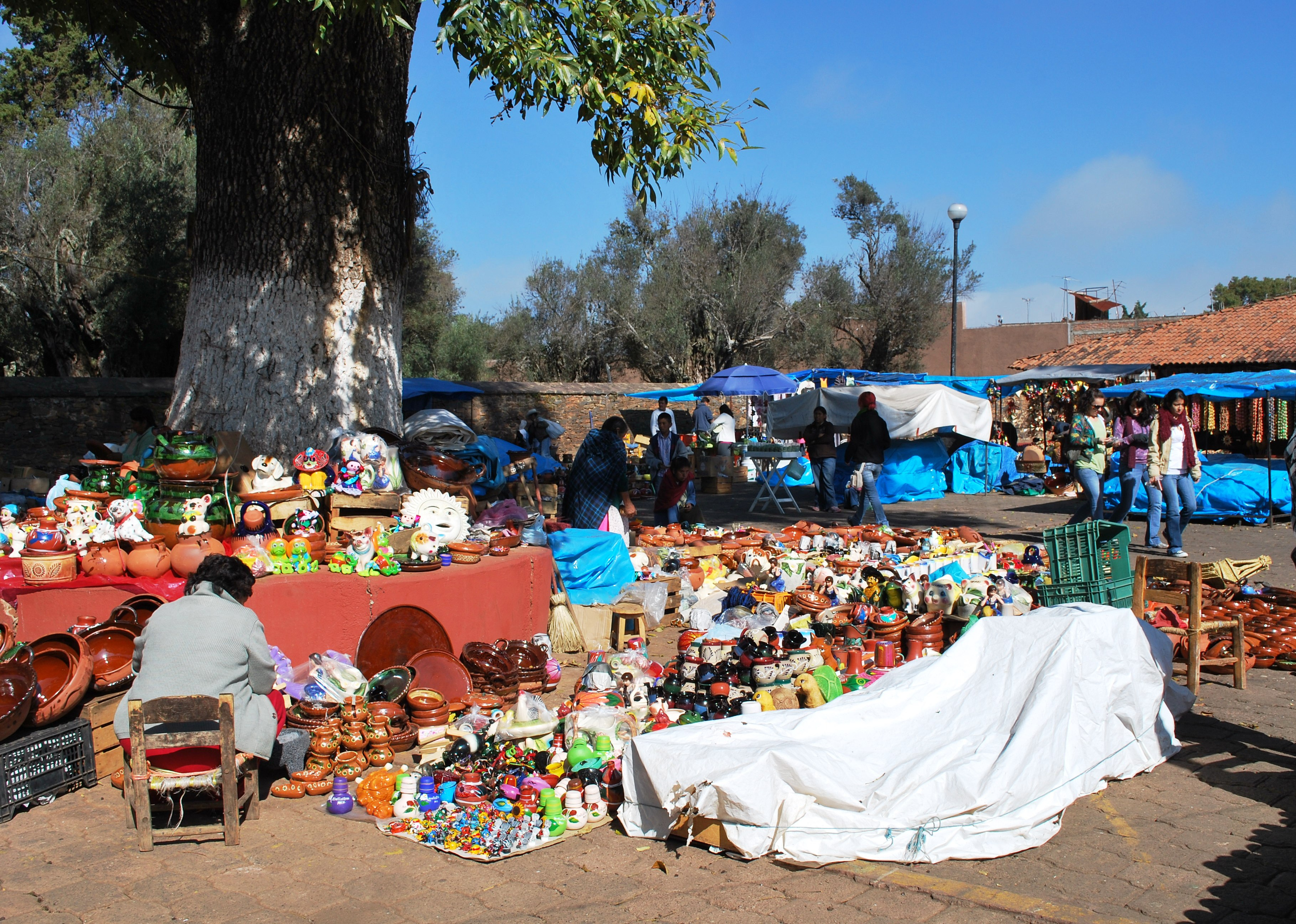
An open-air market or tianguis

=== Yucatan Peninsula and Chiapas ===
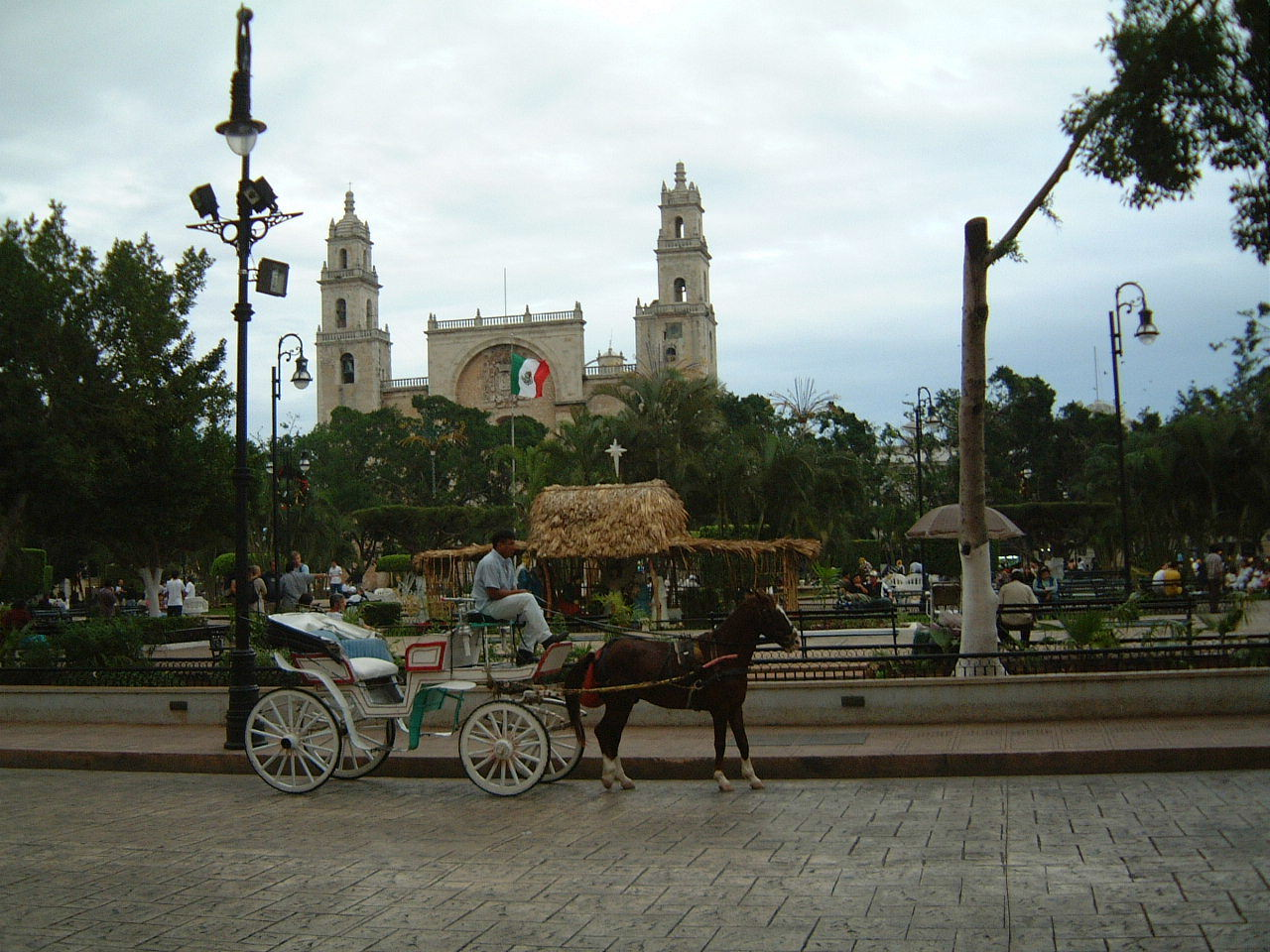
Main Plaza, Mérida Yucatán Mexico.

The peninsula has a considerable number of major archeological sites, including Chichén Itza, Uxmal, and the La Ruta Puuc, a series of small archeological sites. The state capital of Mérida was founded in the colonial era and experienced a major boom in the nineteenth century with the expansion for the market for its sisal cordage or twine, so that the city has a number of mansions of the former sisal barons. Campeche is Mexico's only walled city.

The Mexican state of Chiapas has the archeological sites of Palenque, Bonampak, and Yaxchilán. The capital Tuxtla Gutiérrez is the gateway to the region, with a major airport. San Cristóbal de las Casas, named after the early sixteenth-century defender of indigenous rights, Fr. Bartolomé de las Casas is a colonial-era provincial city.

=== Central West Mexico ===
Tourist destinations include Aguascalientes, Guadalajara, Guanajuato, Manzanillo, Morelia, Pátzcuaro, Querétaro, San Miguel de Allende, and Zacatecas.

==== Guadalajara ====
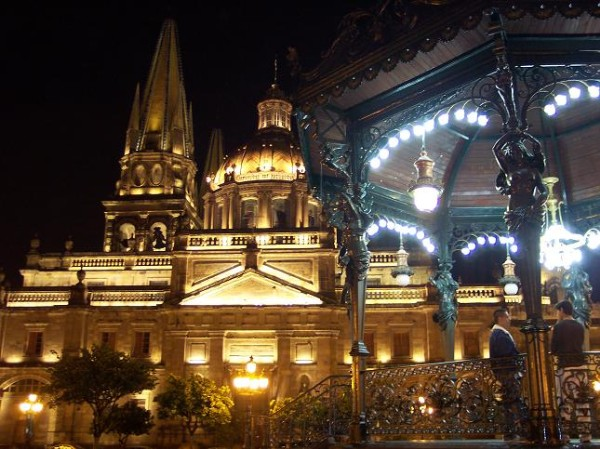
Guadalajara Cathedral

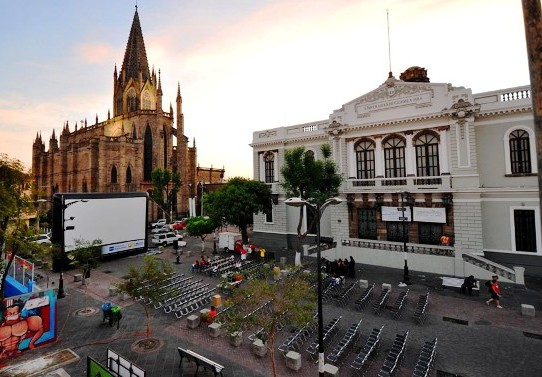
The Guadalajara International Film Festival, founded in 1986, is among the most important film festivals in Latin America.

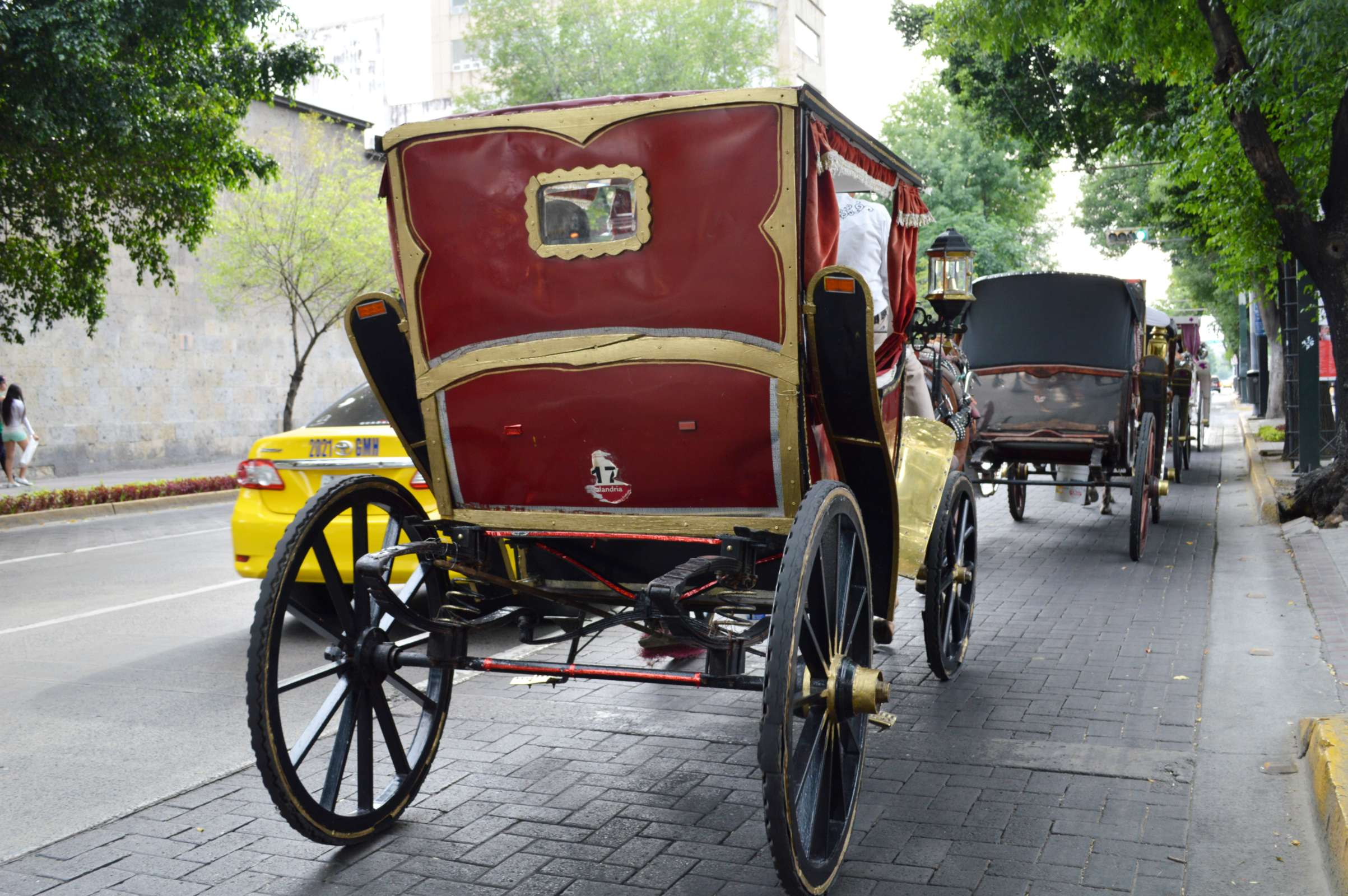
Horse drawn carriage for tourists on Avenida Juarez in Guadalajara, Mexico

Guadalajara, Jalisco, the second-largest Mexican city by population, is home of some of Mexico's best known traditions, such as tequila, mariachi music and charros, or Mexican cowboys. Its similitude with western European countries mixed with modern architecture and infrastructure makes Guadalajara very attractive to tourists. Along with Mexico City and beach destinations (Cancún, Acapulco, etc.), Guadalajara is one of the most visited cities in Mexico. Cultural tourism is the main attraction, the city being home to a large number of museums, art galleries and theatres. The city is also the host of several internationally renowned events, such as the Guadalajara International Book Fair which is the most important exposition of its kind in the Spanish-speaking world, and the second largest book fair in the world. The city is known as a pioneer in the underground arts scene as well as in the electronic music world, another main touristic attraction. Its diversity of European architectural styles is a focus of attraction for tourists, in particular the Metropolitan Cathedral, the Degollado Theatre and the Hospicio Cabañas which is a World Heritage Site and one of the oldest hospital complexes in Spanish America. Other tourism activities include shopping at its world class shopping malls, or plazas, taking a tour to the surrounding areas such as the Huentitan Canyon, Tonalá, Tlaquepaque, Chapala or visiting nearby towns, which are well-connected by modern highways, such as Tequila, Puerto Vallarta or Mazamitla, depending upon whether visitors seek urban, coastal or rural getaways.

==== Morelia ====
Morelia, Michoacán is the Capital of the State of Michoacán. Its Historic Downtown Area (Centro Histórico) encompasses approximately 150 city blocks in the city centre, roughly corresponding to the actual area of the city at the end of the 18th century. The Centro Historico contains over 1,000 historical sites, including (but not limited to) the cathedral and the aqueduct.

=== Northeast Mexico ===
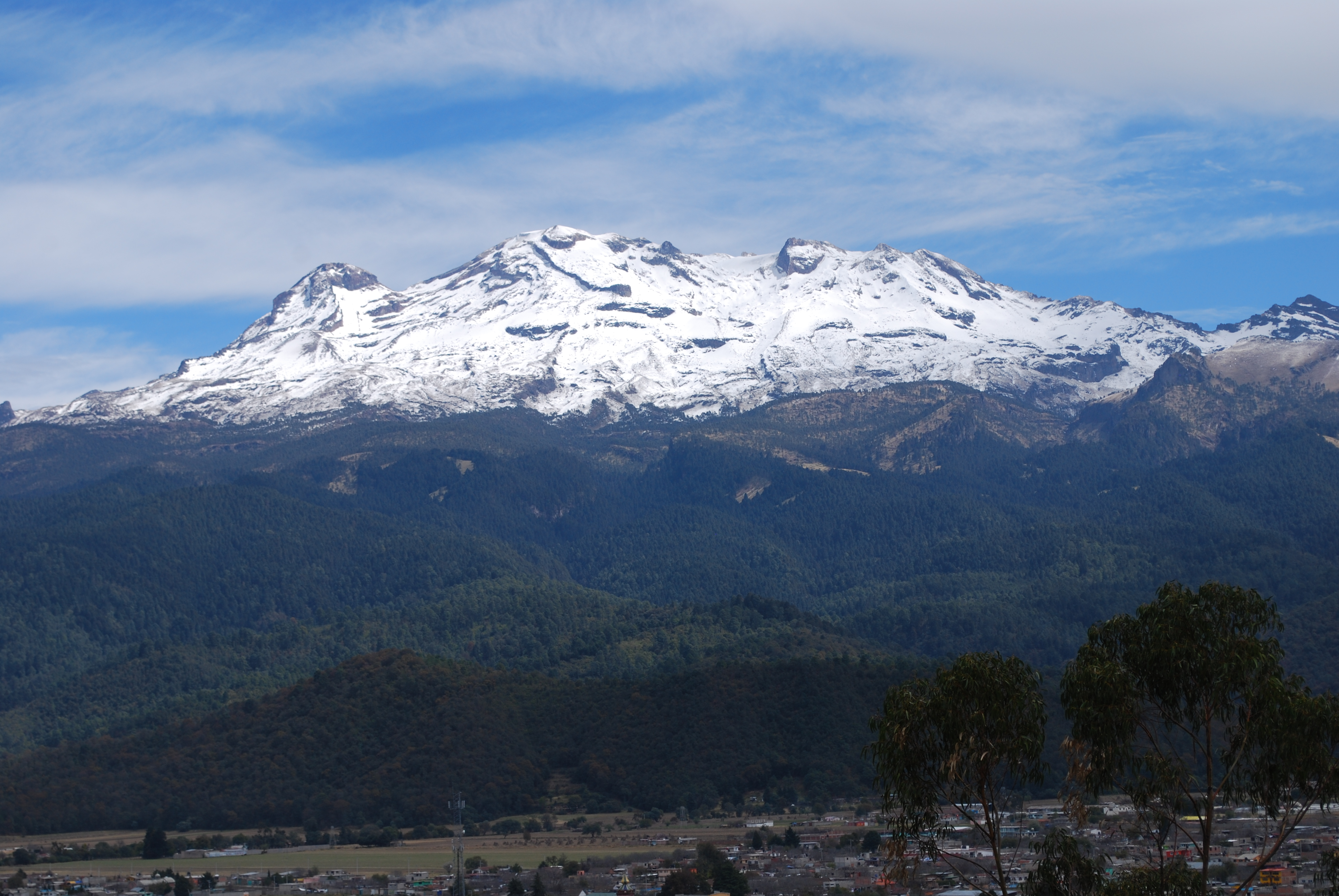
Iztaccihuatl the name is Nahuatl for "White woman," reflecting the four individual snow-capped peaks which depict the head, chest, knees and feet of a sleeping female when seen from east or west.

==== Monterrey ====
Monterrey, Nuevo Leon, was founded in the late 16th century. The downtown district is the oldest section in the city, surrounded by newer neighbourhoods. The Museo de Historia Mexicana (Museum of Mexican History), MARCO (Monterrey Museum of Contemporary Art), Metropolitan Museum of Monterrey and the Museum of the Palacio de Gobierno, or State House, are some of the better known museums in the city, as well as nationally. The Santa Lucia Riverwalk is a riverwalk similar to the one in San Antonio, Texas, having a length of 2.5 km (1.6 mi) and connecting the Fundidora Park with the Macroplaza, one of the largest plazas in the world.

=== Northwest Mexico ===
Northwest Mexico has a few major tourist destinations, including Chihuahua City and Mazatlan. The Copper Canyon Railway travels through rugged scenery.

== Tourist cities ==
=== Historic colonial cities ===
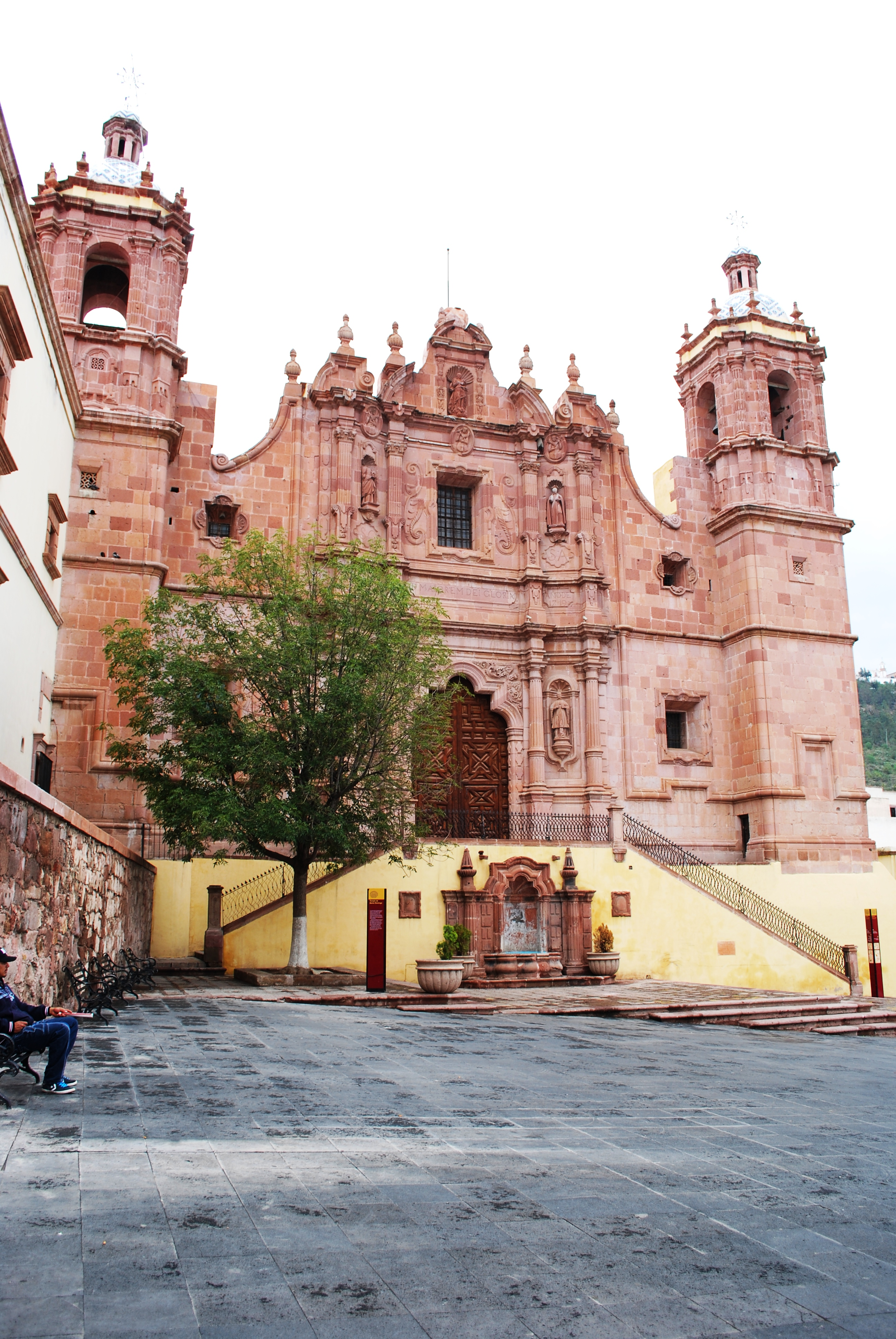
Temple of Santo Domingo in Zacatecas

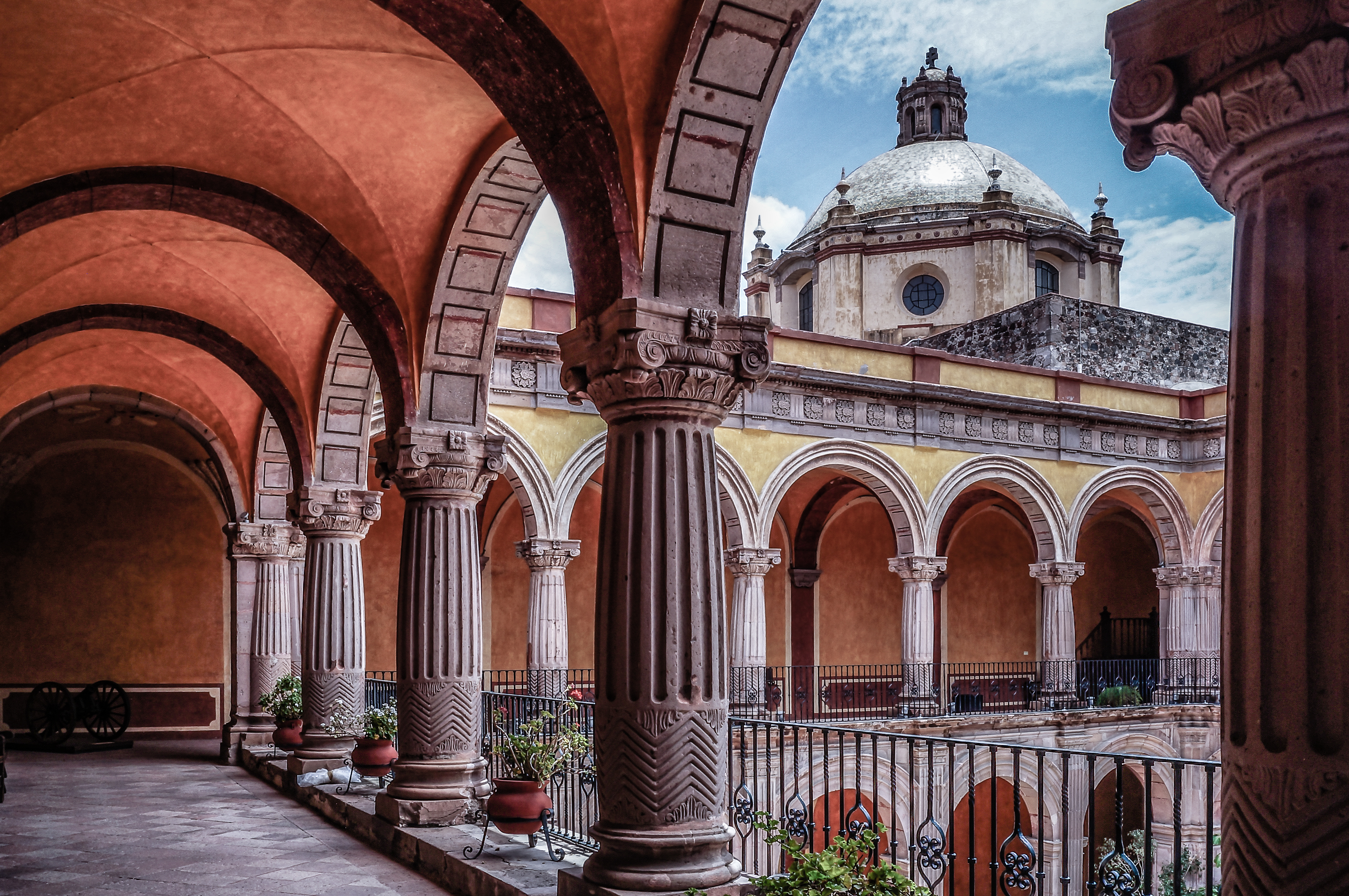
Templo de San Francisco Ex Convent of Santiago in Querétaro City

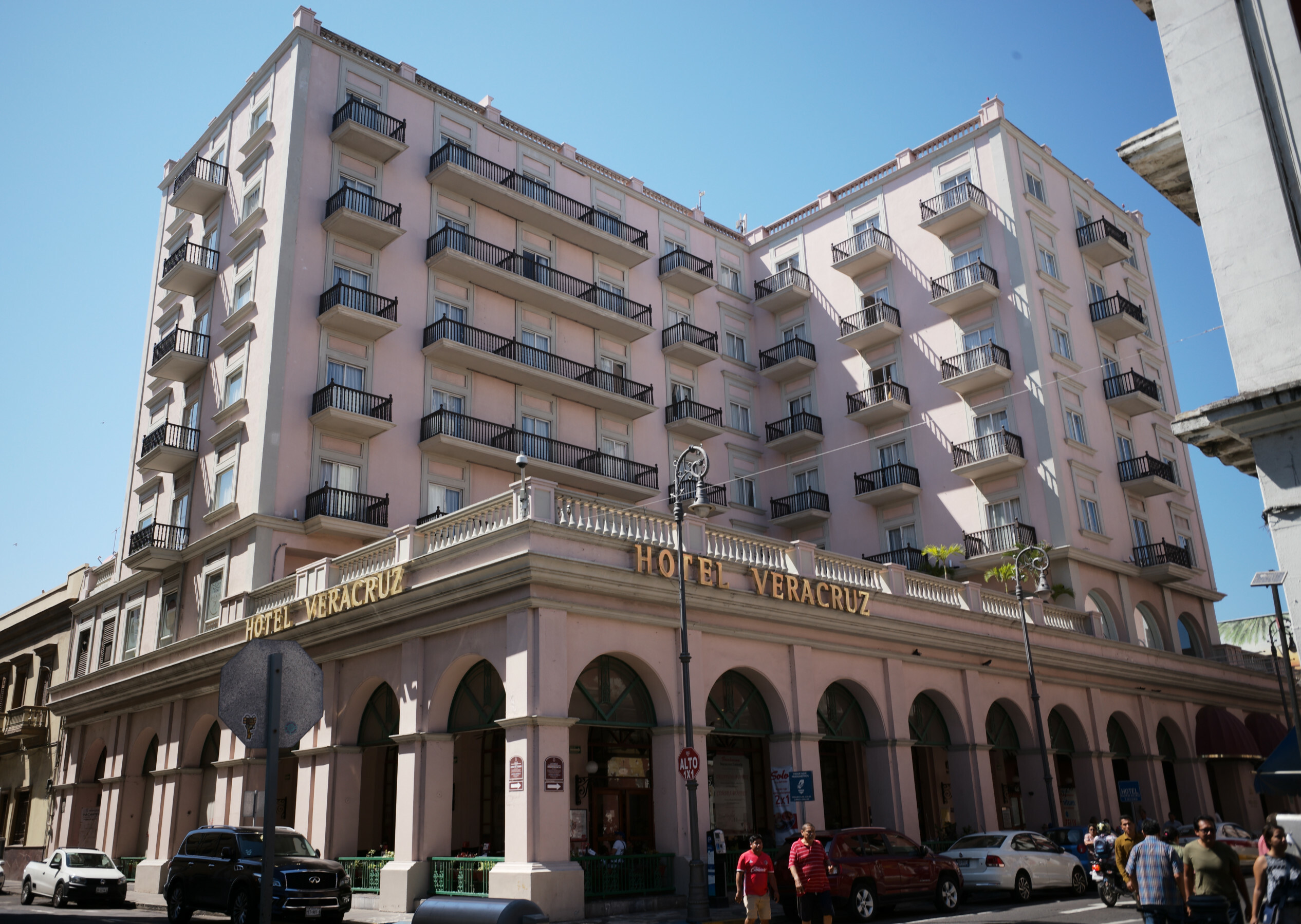
Hotel in Veracruz's historic center.

- Campeche, Campeche. The only walled city in Mexico is a UNESCO World Heritage Site.
- Cuernavaca, Morelos. Historic architecture, including the Palace of Hernán Cortés.
- Durango, Durango. The most important northern colonial capital city in Mexico. Dubbed the Pearl of the Guadiana Valley, has many colonial mansions, one of these is the Count of Suchil Palace.
- Guanajuato, Guanajuato. A major city of colonial Mexico's silver mining, a UNESCO World Heritage Site.
- Mérida, Yucatán. Dubbed the white city, with Mayan tradition has many colonial mansions of impressive beauty.
- Morelia, Michoacán. Excellent colonial architecture; a World Heritage Site
- Oaxaca, Oaxaca. Colonial architecture and Indigenous traditions are mixed here; it is a World Heritage Site
- Querétaro. The state capital has a baroque downtown, declared a World Heritage Site.
- San Luis Potosí, San Luis Potosí. This colonial city was the capital of Mexico twice.
- Taxco, Guerrero. Has a very famous baroque church is located here, its interior is the most admired since the baroque ornamentations are all covered in gold.
- Zacatecas, Zacatecas. The city was built during colonial Mexico's silver mining boom, its historic center is a UNESCO World Heritage Site.

=== General tourism ===
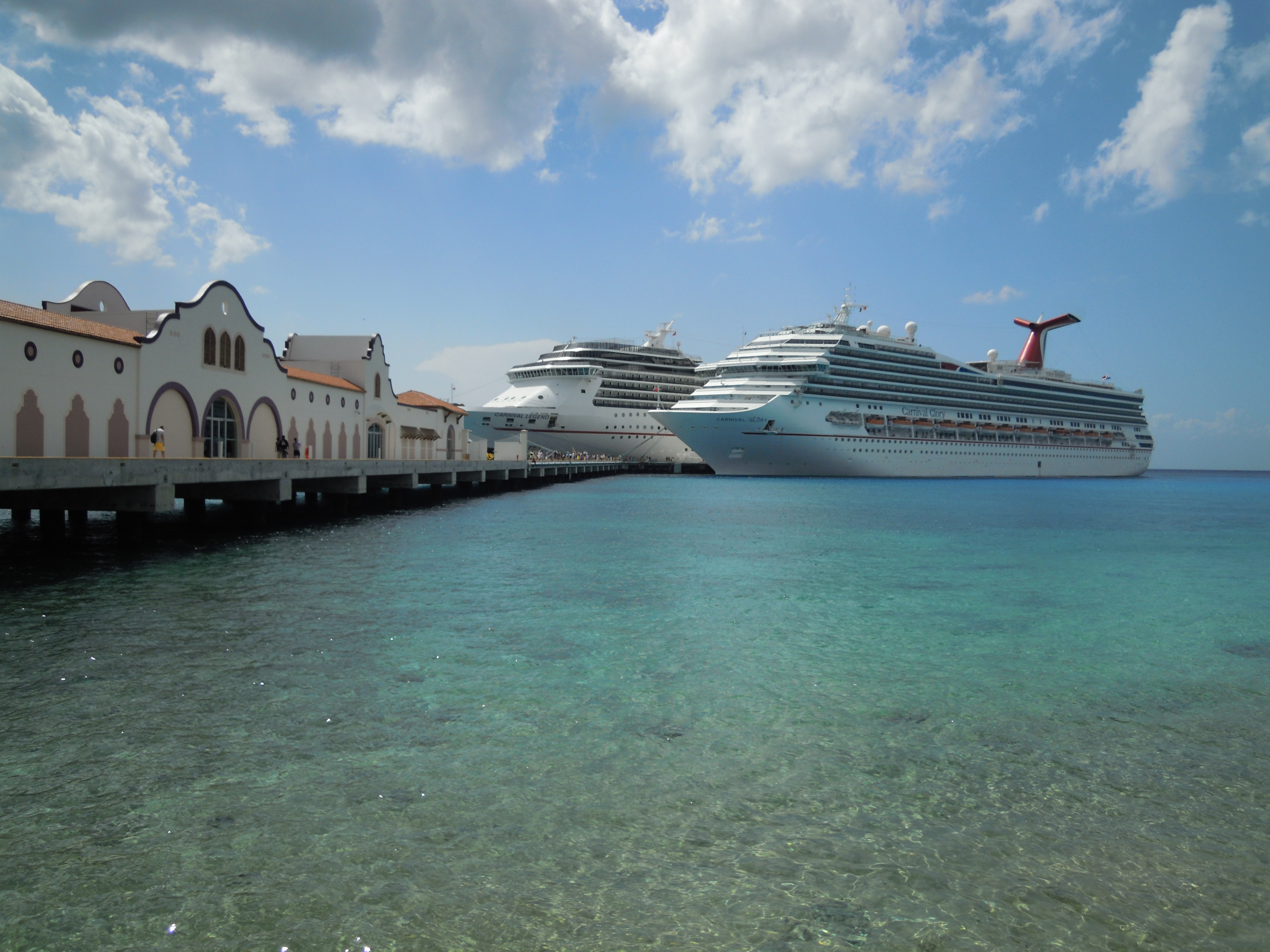
The island of Cozumel, Quintana Roo

- Monterrey, Nuevo León
- Nuevo Laredo, Tamaulipas
- León, Guanajuato
- Guadalajara, Jalisco – and nearby Lake Chapala
- Papantla, Veracruz – vanilla
- Piedras Negras, Coahuila
- San Cristóbal de las Casas, Chiapas
- San Luis Potosí, San Luis Potosí
- Saltillo, Coahuila
- Tequila, Jalisco
- Tijuana, Baja California
- Torreón, Coahuila
- Puerto Vallarta festival
- San Sebastián del Oeste, Jalisco
- Zipolite, and Mazunte, Oaxaca

== Tourist sites ==
=== Historic independence war sites ===
- Dolores Hidalgo, Guanajuato. The site where the Mexican Independence War from Spain began.
- Cuautla, Morelos. Site of a major battle during the War of Mexican Independence.
- Veracruz, Veracruz. The first City Hall in the Americas was settled here, as well as the historic fort of San Juan de Ulúa. The city was twice occupied by U.S. invaders (1847 and 1914).

=== Archeological sites ===
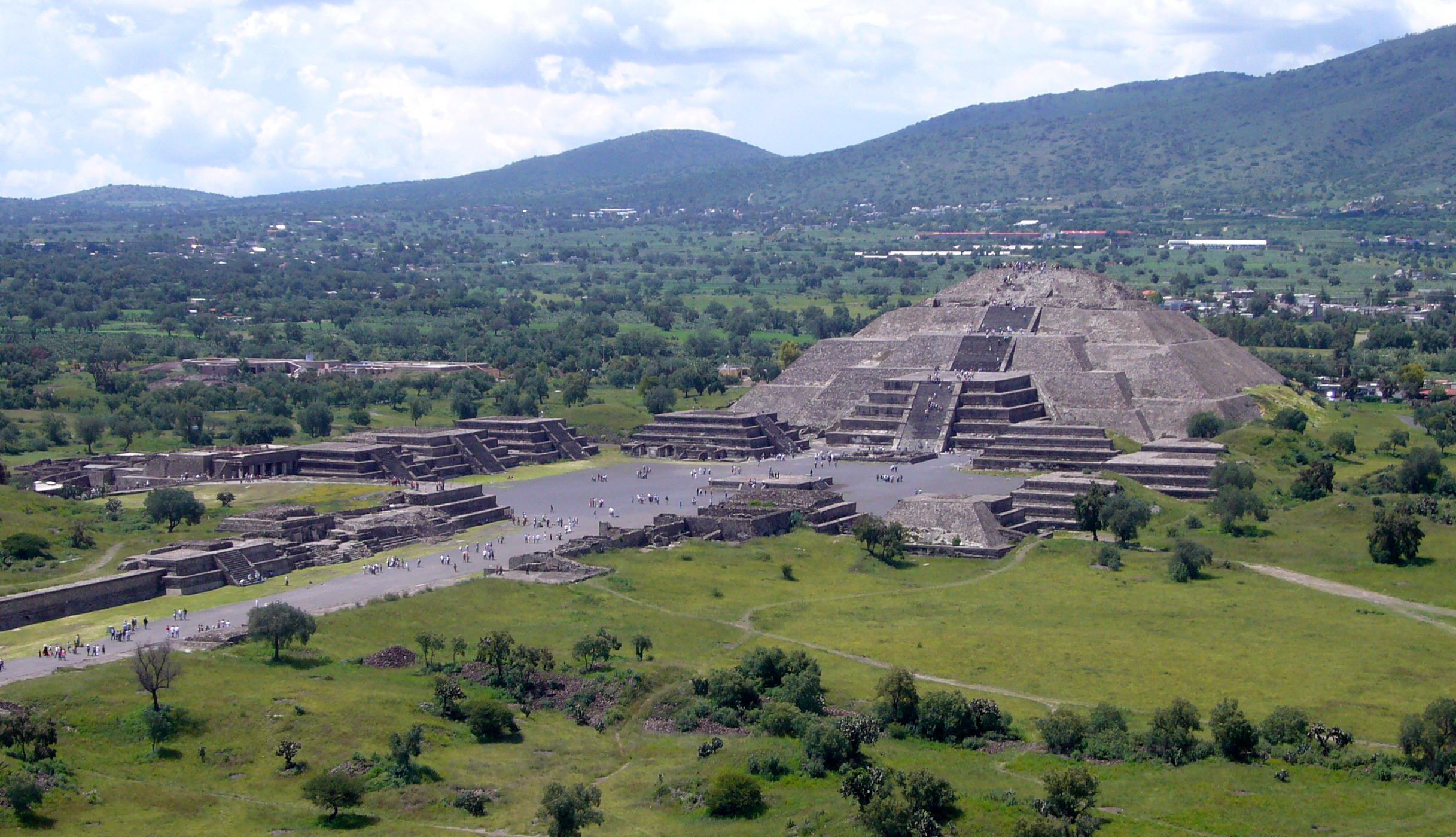
The view from the Pyramid of the Sun

- Teotihuacan
- Tula
- Monte Albán
- Chichen-Itzá
- Uxmal
- Palenque
- Tulum
- Calakmul and Edzná
- Xochicalco
- Malinalco
- El Tajín
- Cholula
- Casas Grandes
- Chalcatzingo

The central and southern parts of Mexico was where a number of pre-Hispanic civilizations developed, the most prominent being the Aztec, Mayan, and the Olmec as well as Zapotec and Mixtec. There are numerous tourist destinations where these ruins can be viewed. The Mexican government has taken jurisdiction of many sites, often setting guidelines for excavation, preservation, and limitations on numbers of visitors, but nearby indigenous communities, who see these sites as part of their direct cultural heritage, object to those regulations.

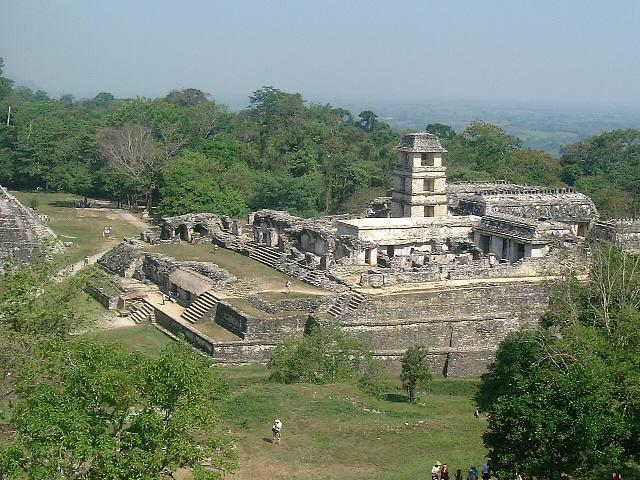
Palenque, Chiapas

The Yucatán peninsula was home to the Mayan people, and many of the indigenous people still speak the language. The area also contains many sites where ruins of the Maya civilization can be visited. The richest of these are located in the eastern half of the peninsula and are collectively known as La Ruta Puuc (or La Ruta Maya). The largest of the Ruta Puuc sites is Uxmal, which was abandoned in the 12th century.

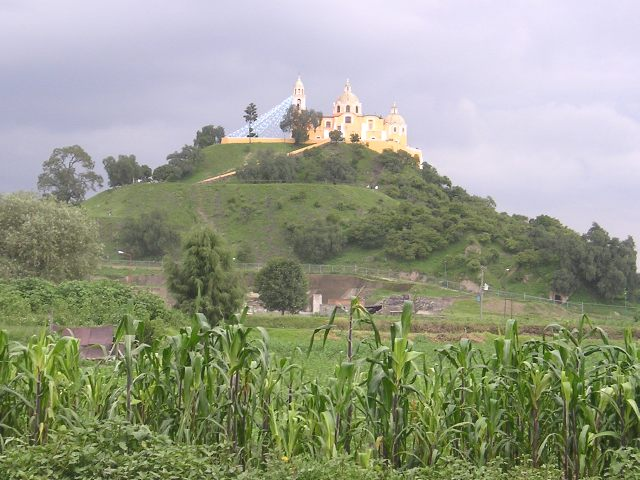
Great Pyramid of Cholula is the largest archaeological site of a pyramid (temple) in the New World, as well as the largest pyramid known to exist in the world today.

A one-hour drive to the northeast of Ruta Puuc are the surviving remains of the city of Mayapán. This settlement was controlled by Chichén Itzá to the east, now a large archaeological site with many interesting ruins. Other ruins on the peninsula include the aforementioned Tulum on the east coast, Cobá to the northwest of Tulum, Polé (now Xcaret) just south of Playa del Carmen and Calakmul in the nature reserve along the Guatemala border. However this list by no means exhausts the number of archaeological sites to be found in this area.

To the west, the state of Chiapas includes the temples and ruins of Palenque, the glyphs of the city of Yaxchilán, the painted walls of nearby Bonampak, and the remains of the fortress of Toniná. In the city of Villahermosa to the north is the Parque-Museo La Venta, with a collection of Olmec sculptures.

Along the gulf coast area in the state of Veracruz are more archaeological sites, with the Olmec ceremonial center of Tres Zapotes, the ruins of the large Totonac city of Zempoala, and the ruins of El Tajín with the Pyramid of the Niches. The city of Xalapa contains the Museo de Antropología, a notable museum featuring a collection of massive Olmec head sculptures.

In the state of Oaxaca along the Pacific coast are the ruins of Mitla, known as the "City of Death" and of Monte Albán, the remains of the once extensive Zapotec capital and religious center.

Moving to the north, the central region around Mexico City contains several archaeological sites. To the southwest are the massive ruins of Teotihuacán, including the Pyramid of the Sun and the Temple of Quetzalcoatl. To the southeast near the city of Cholula is the Great Pyramid, visible from the city center. Just to the north of Cholula are the well-preserved ruins of the city of Cacaxtla. Last but not least is the Toltec capital of Tula, to the north of Mexico City. In the capital itself is the largest museum in Mexico, the Museo Nacional de Antropología.

Finally, less visited than the major sites are the mysterious ruins of La Quemada, sometimes referred to as Chicomostoc, located south of Zacatecas, Zacatecas in the northern half of Mexico.

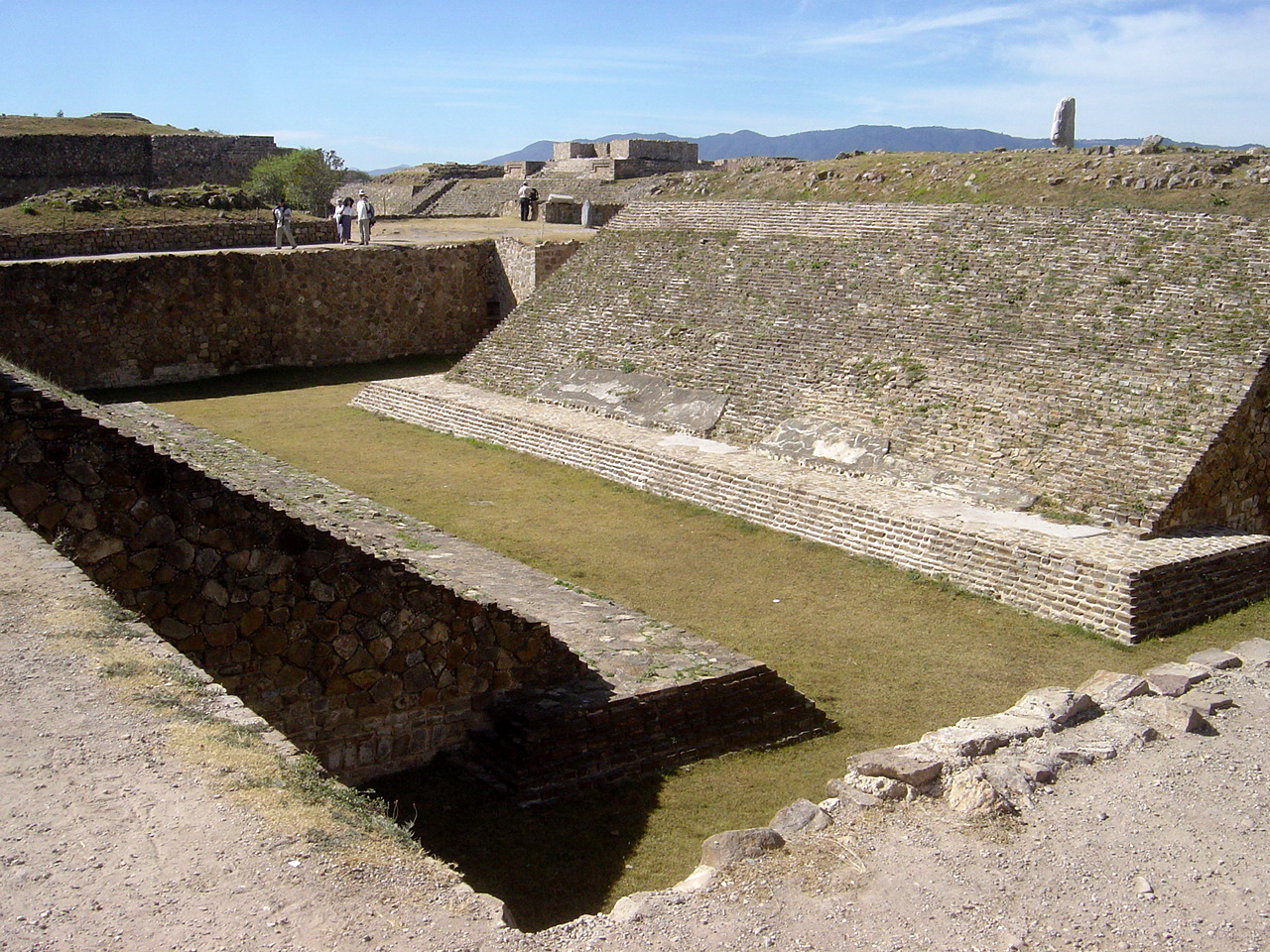
Monte Albán

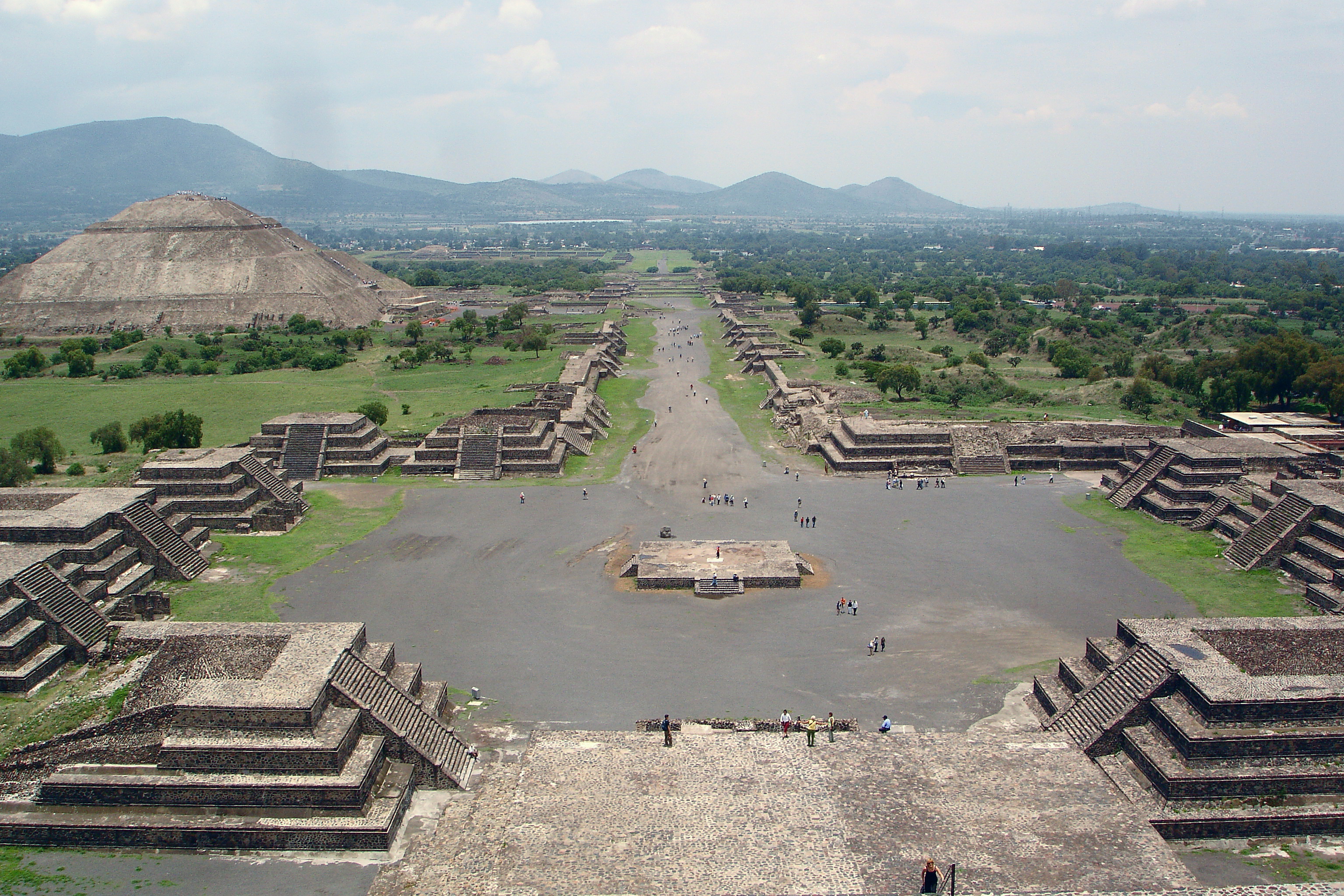
Teotihuacan

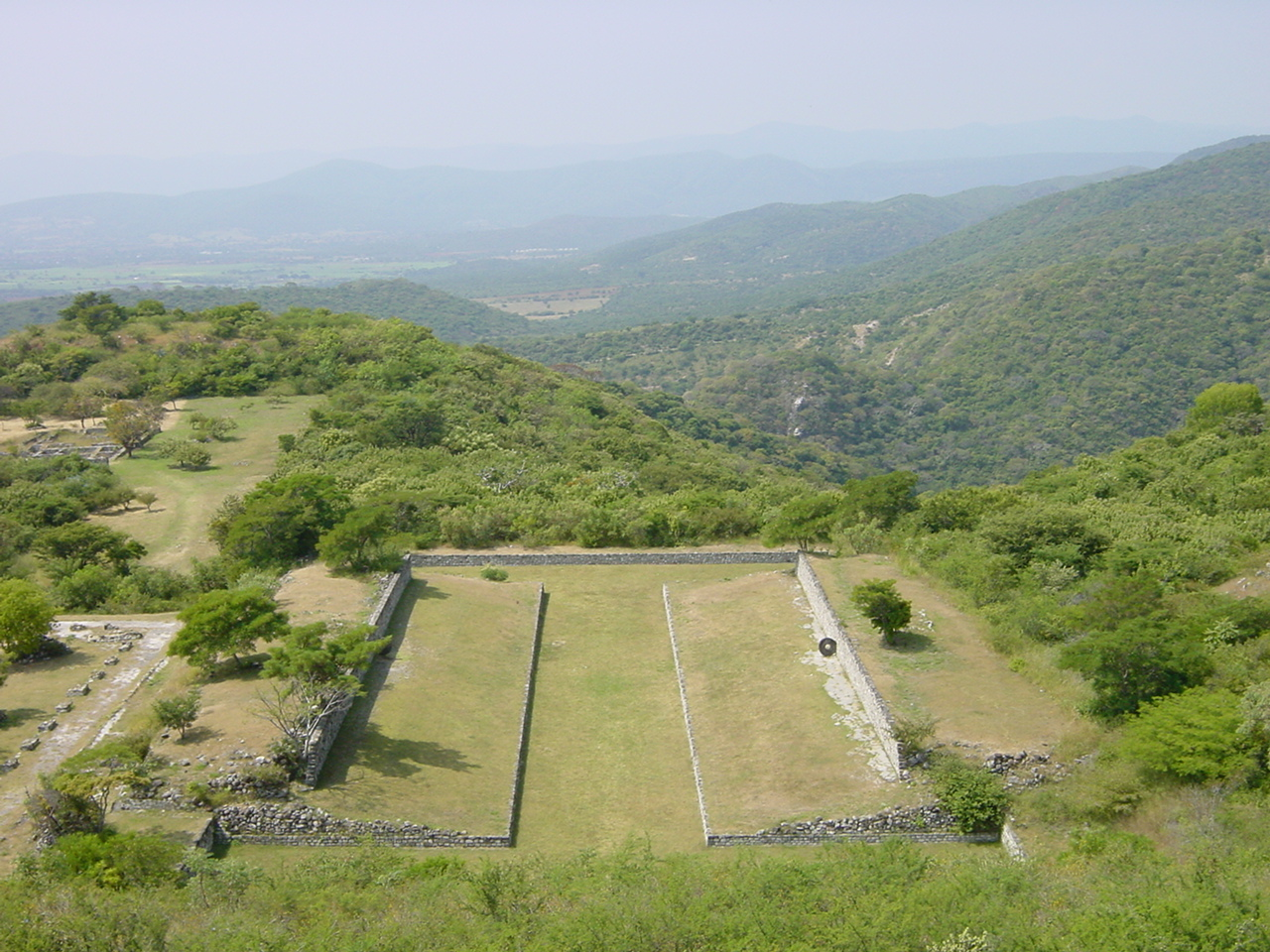
The primary ballcourt at Xochicalco.

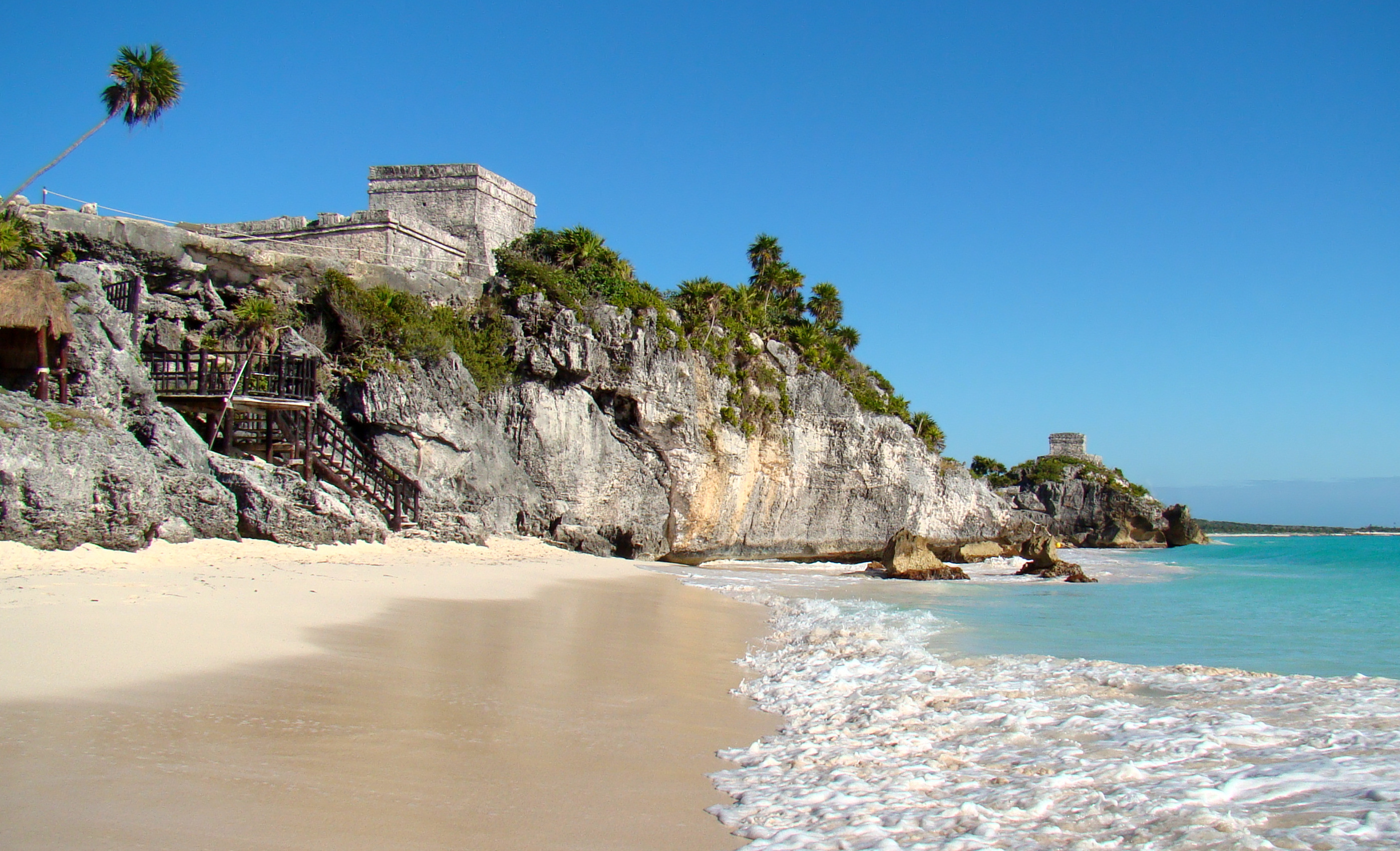
Tulum

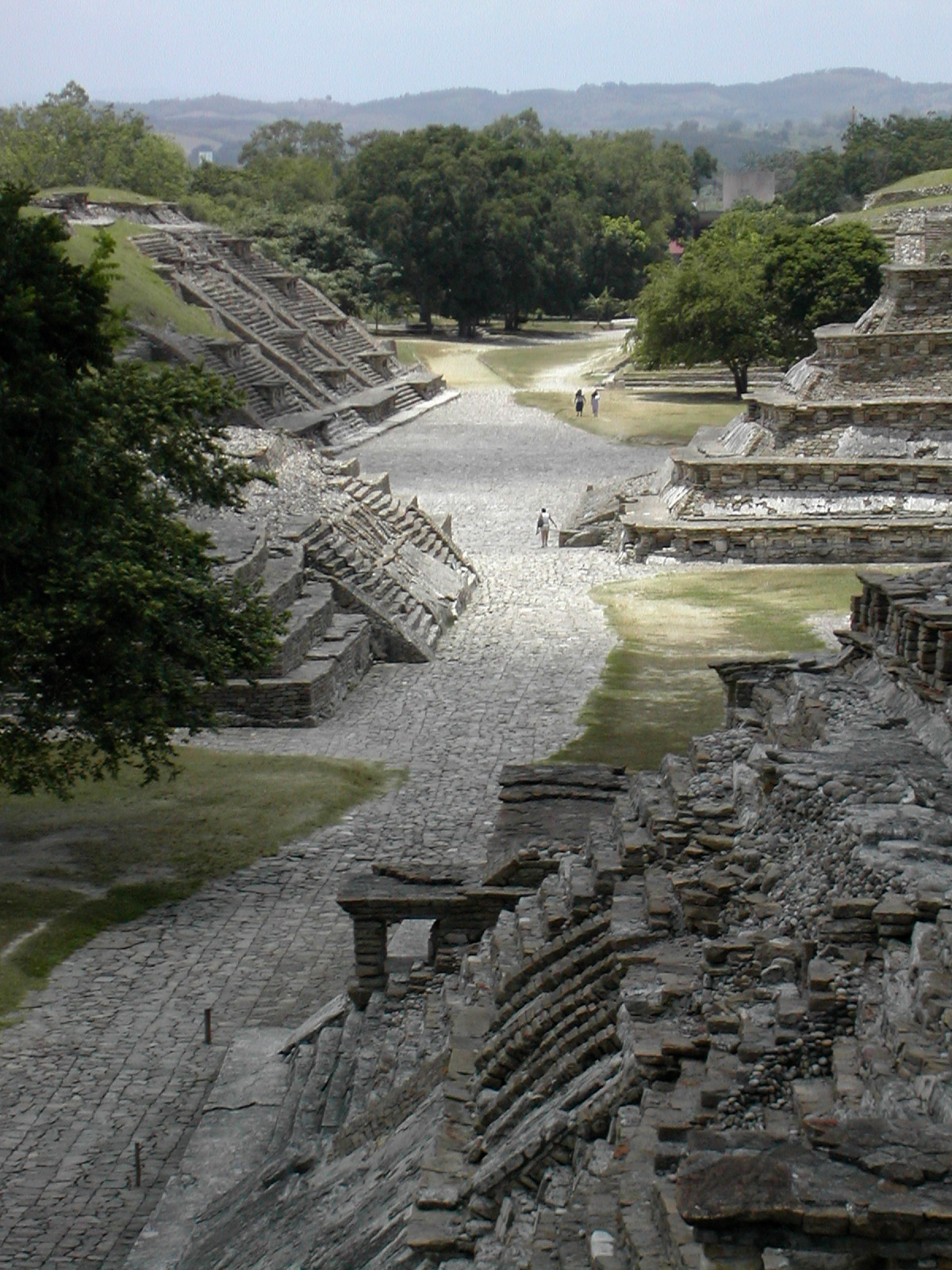
El Tajín
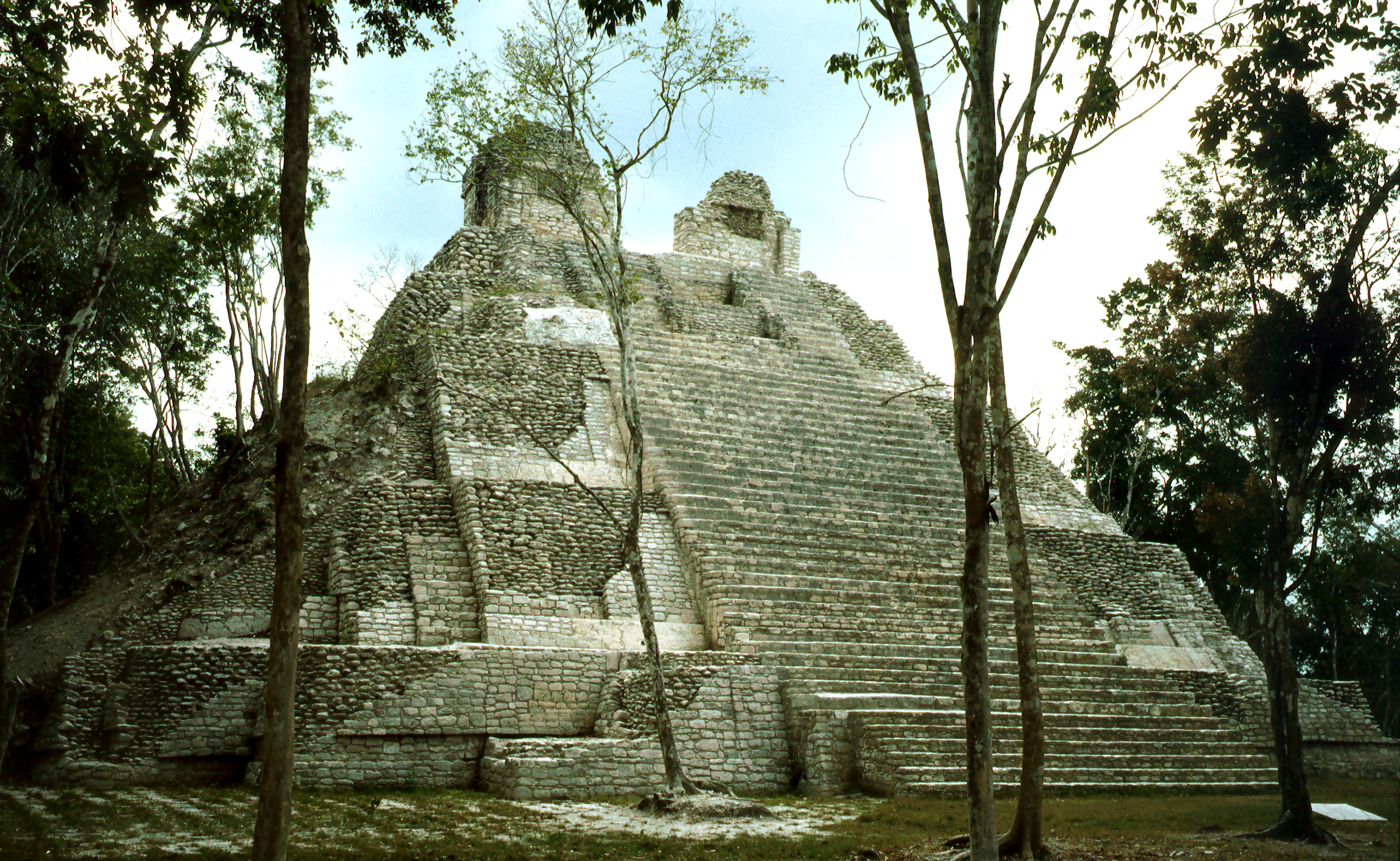
Dzibanché

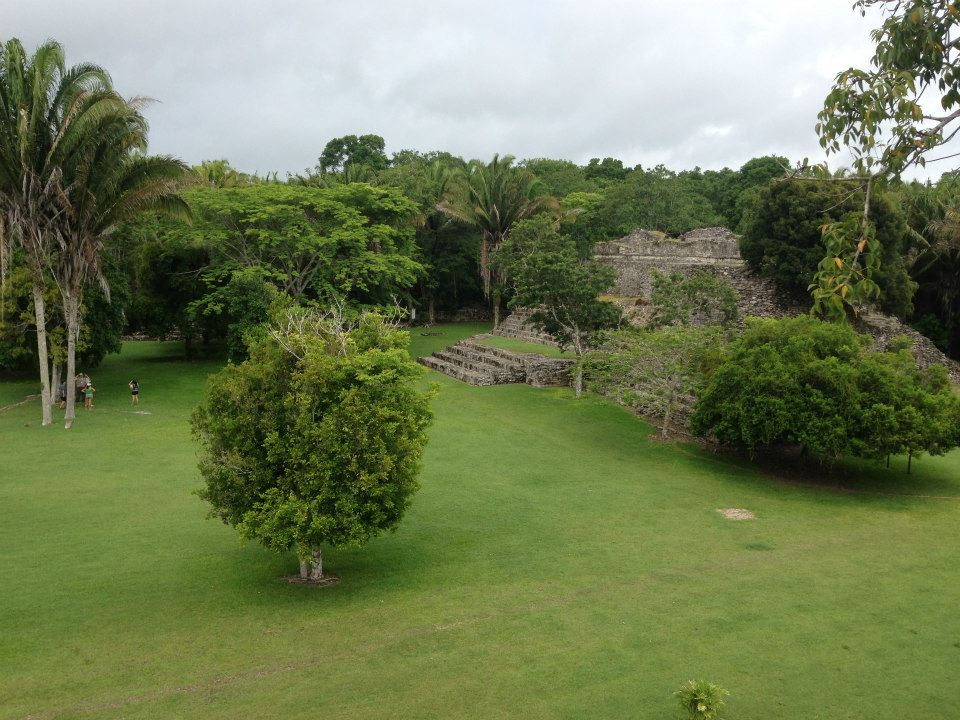
Kohunlich

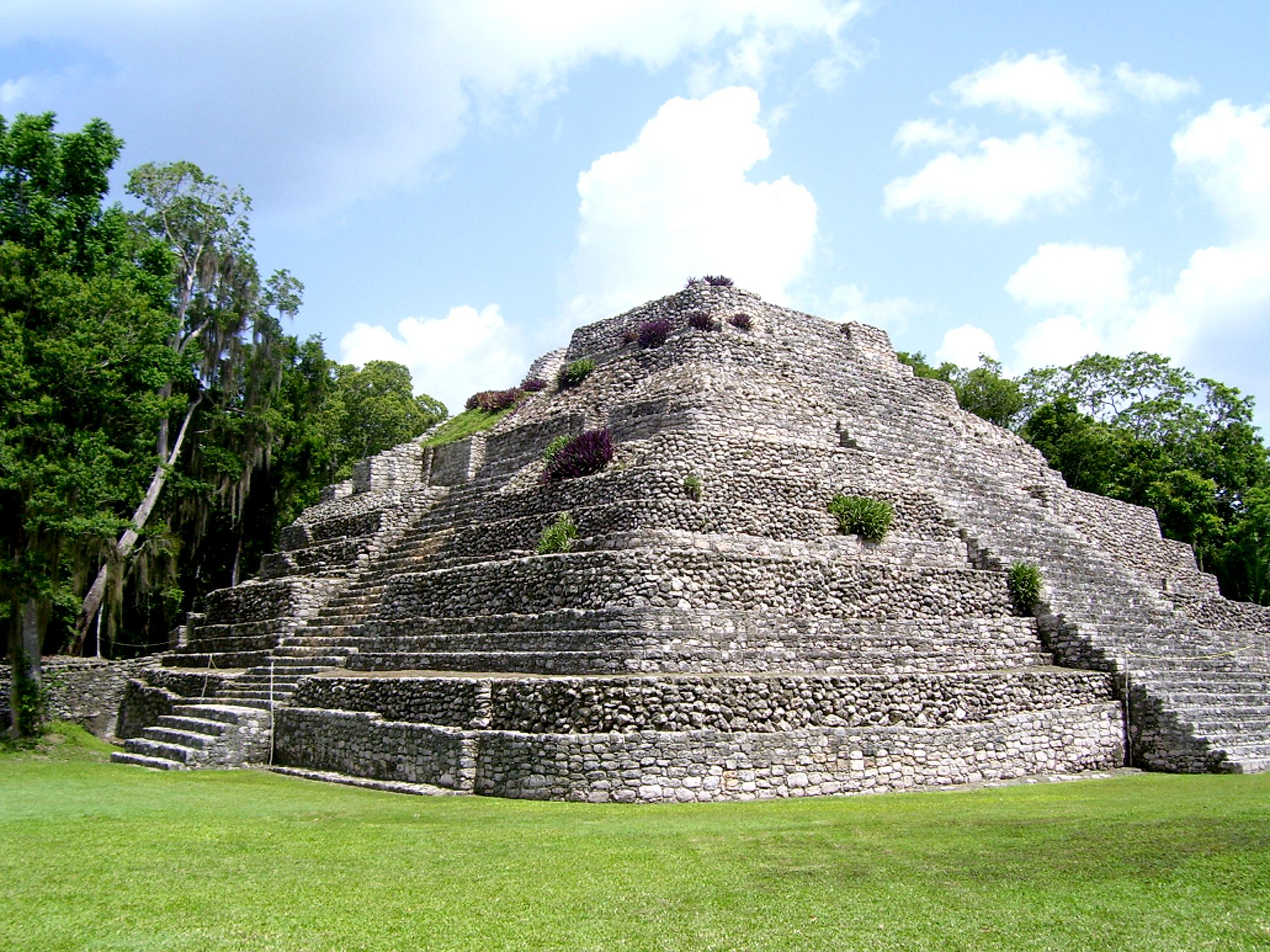
Chacchobén

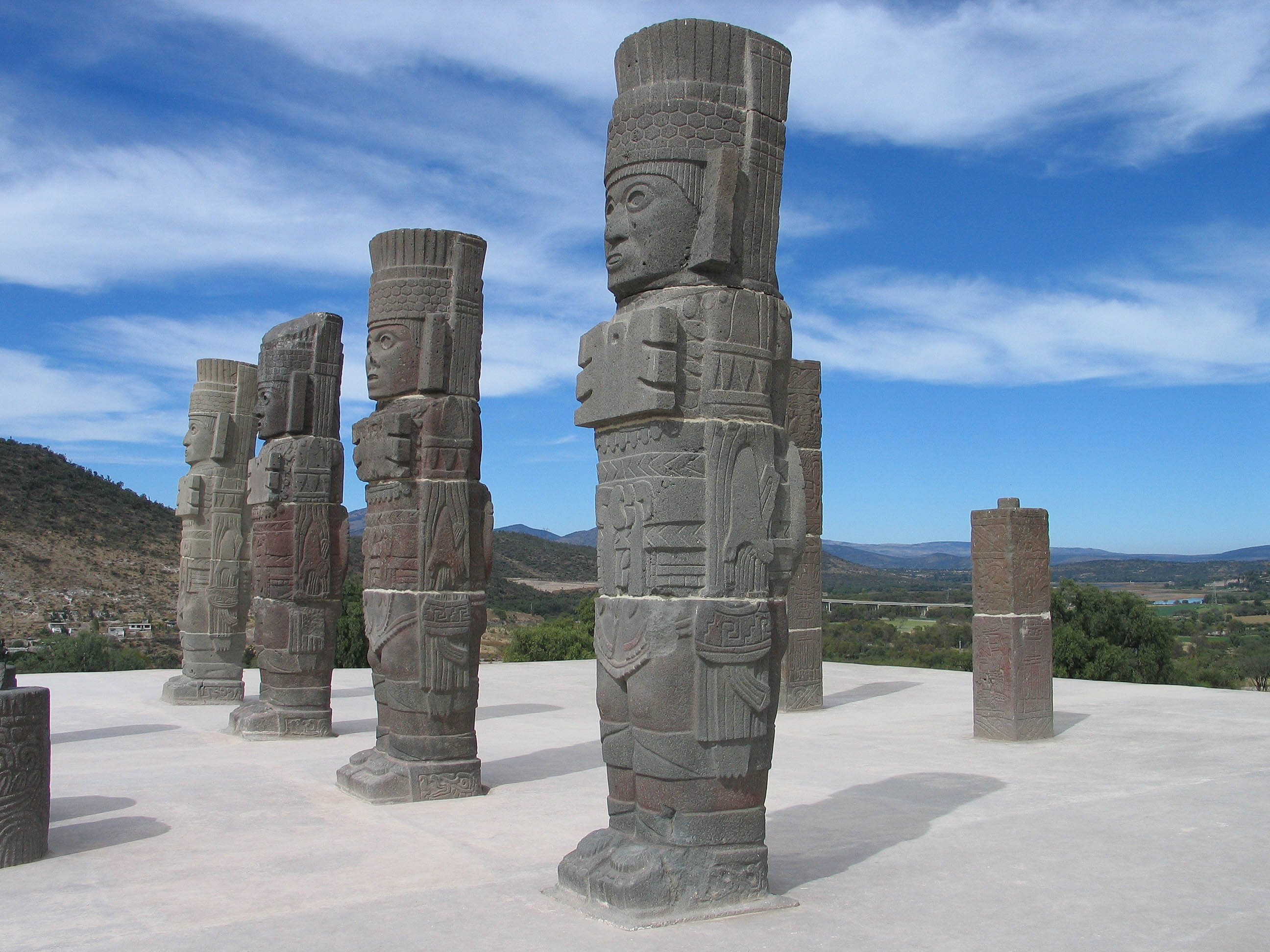
Tula

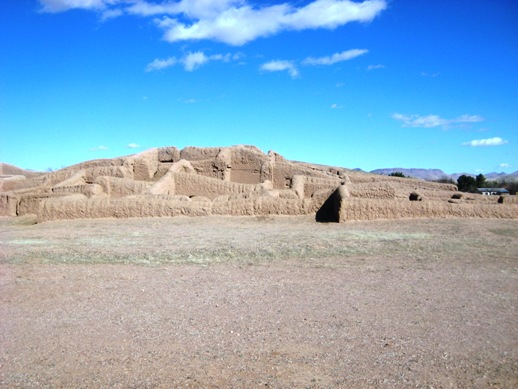
Paquimé

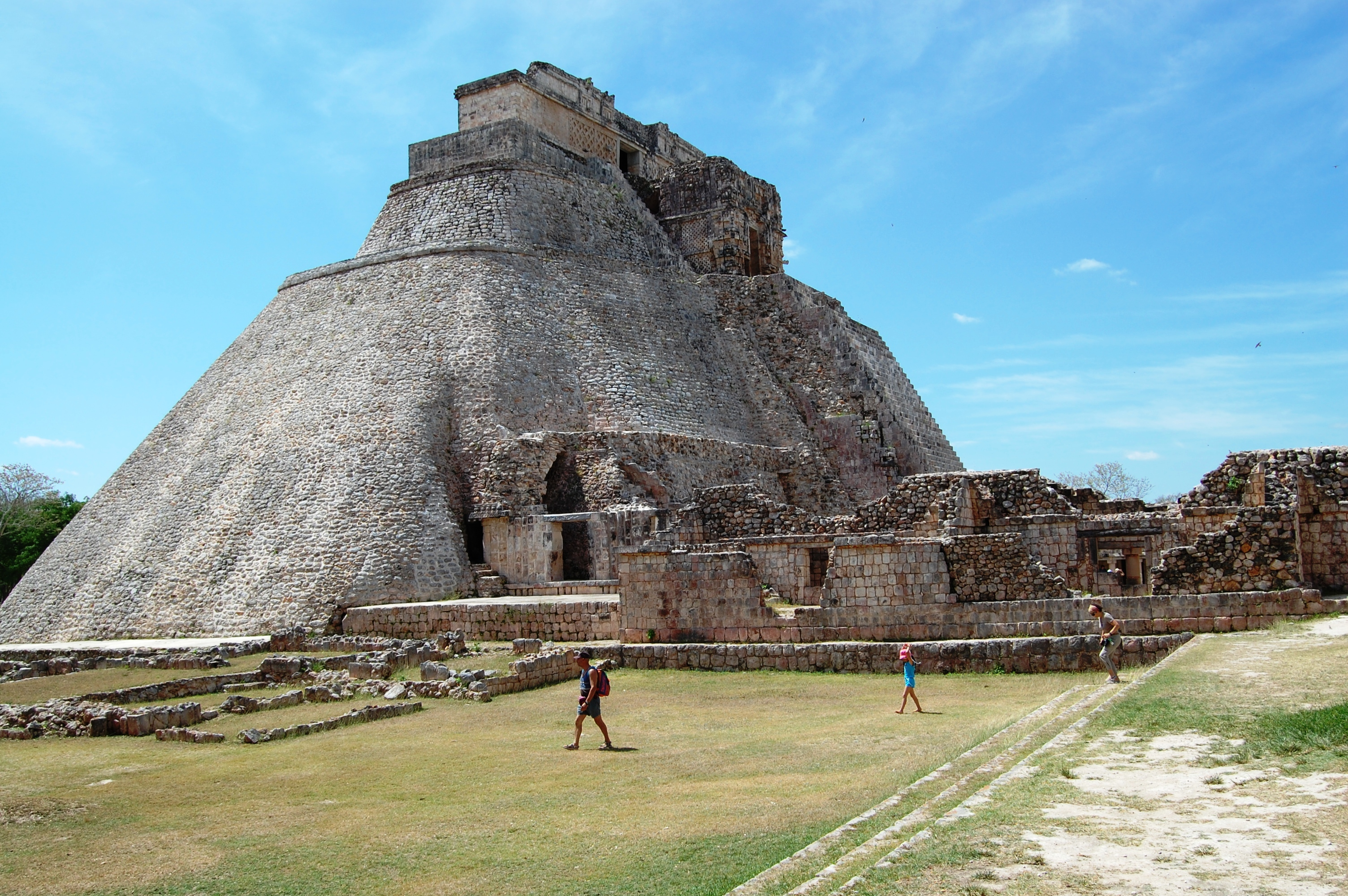
Uxmal

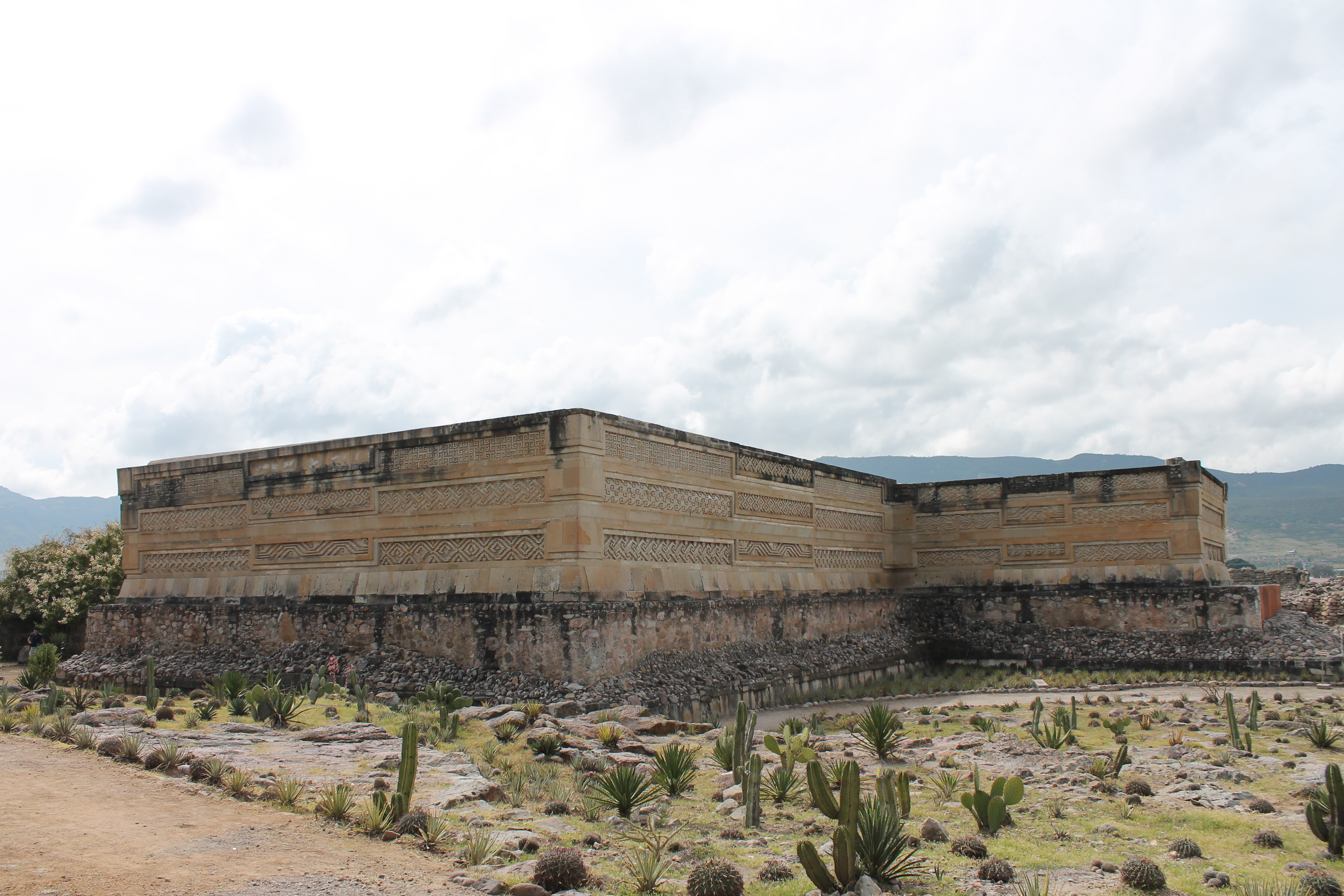
Mitla

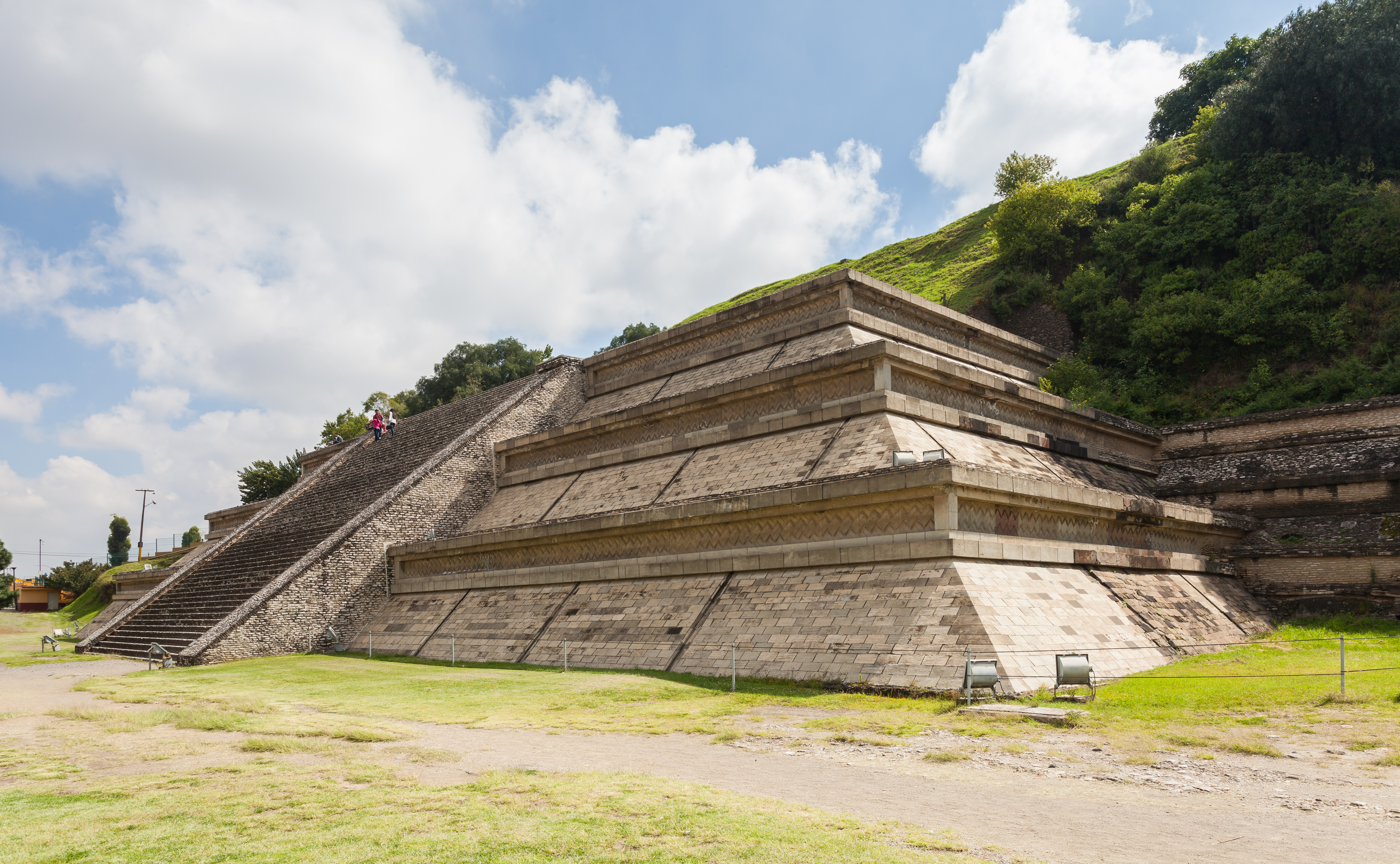
Cholula

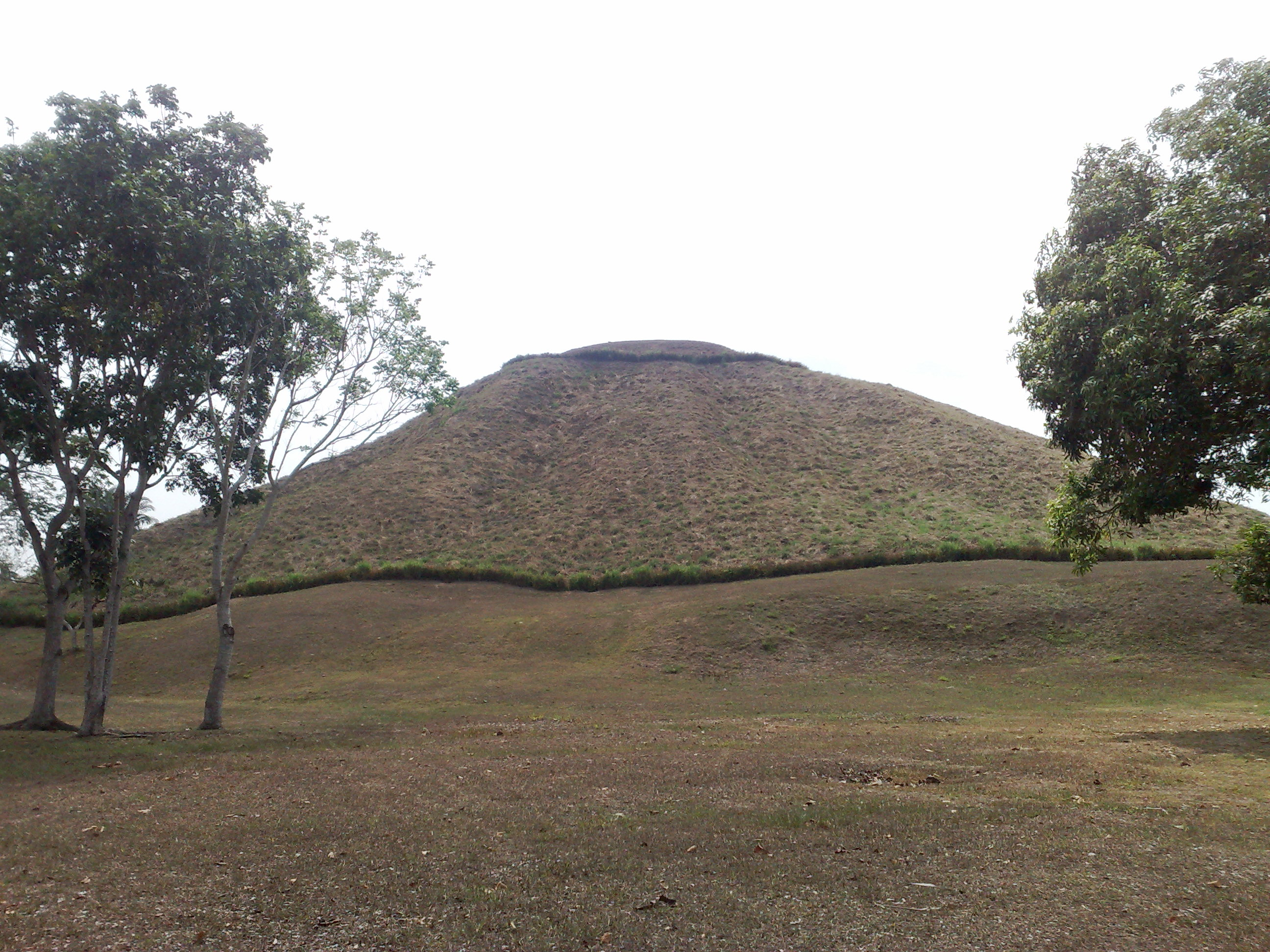
La Venta

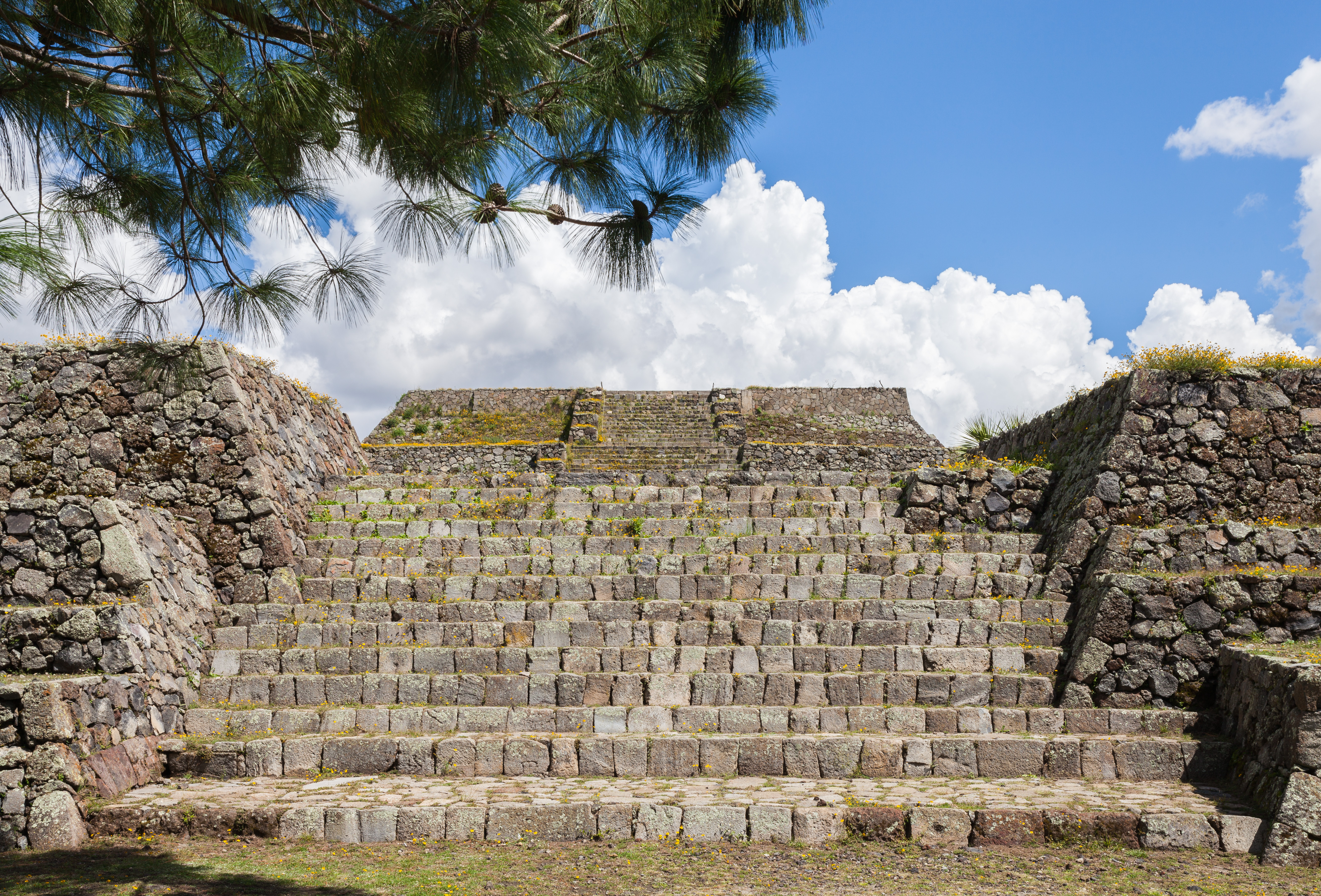
Cantona

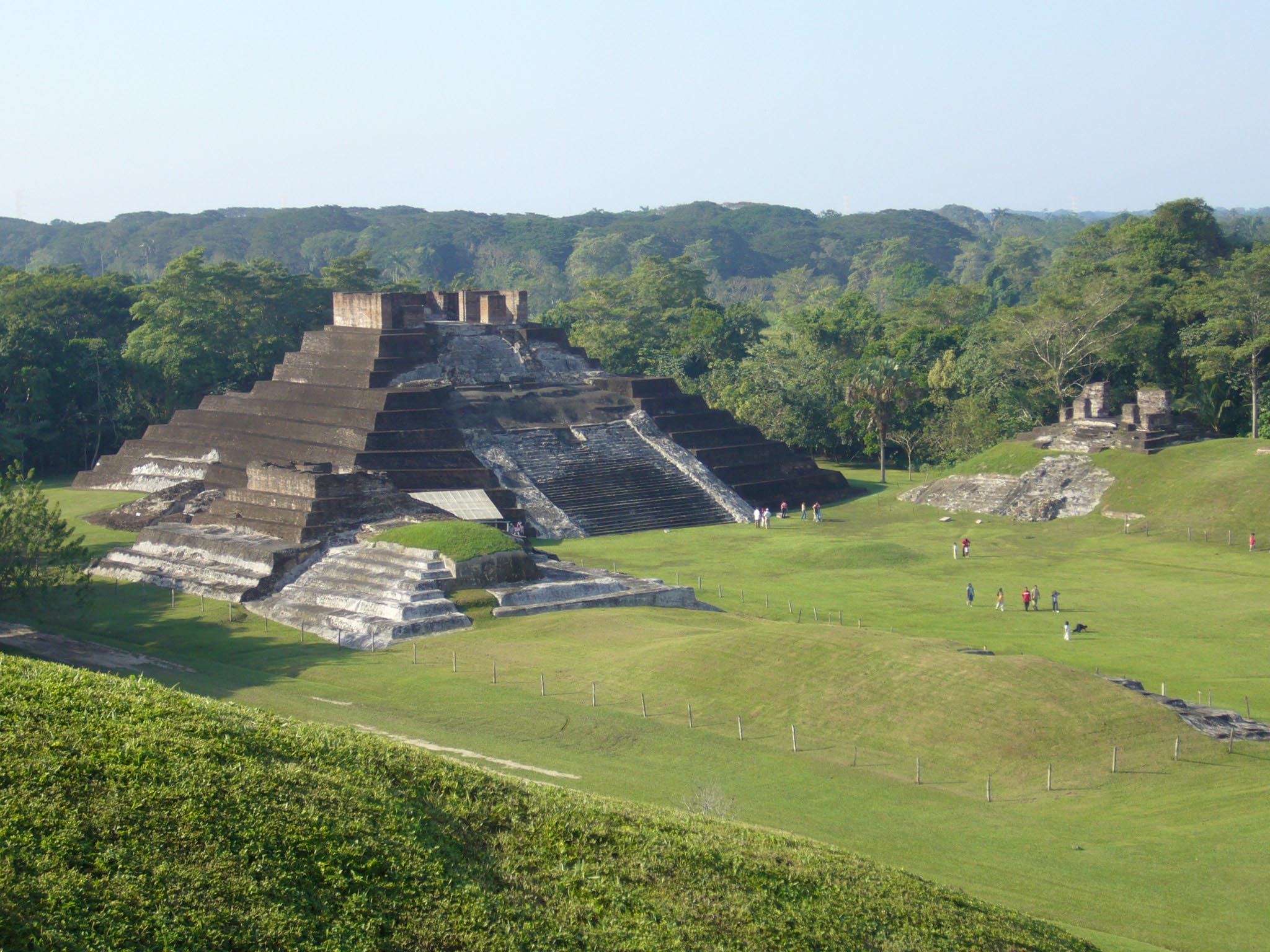
Comalcalco

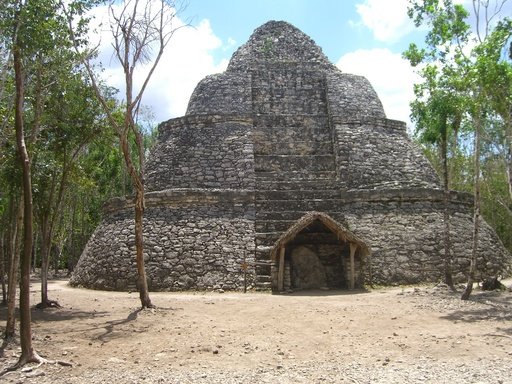
Cobá

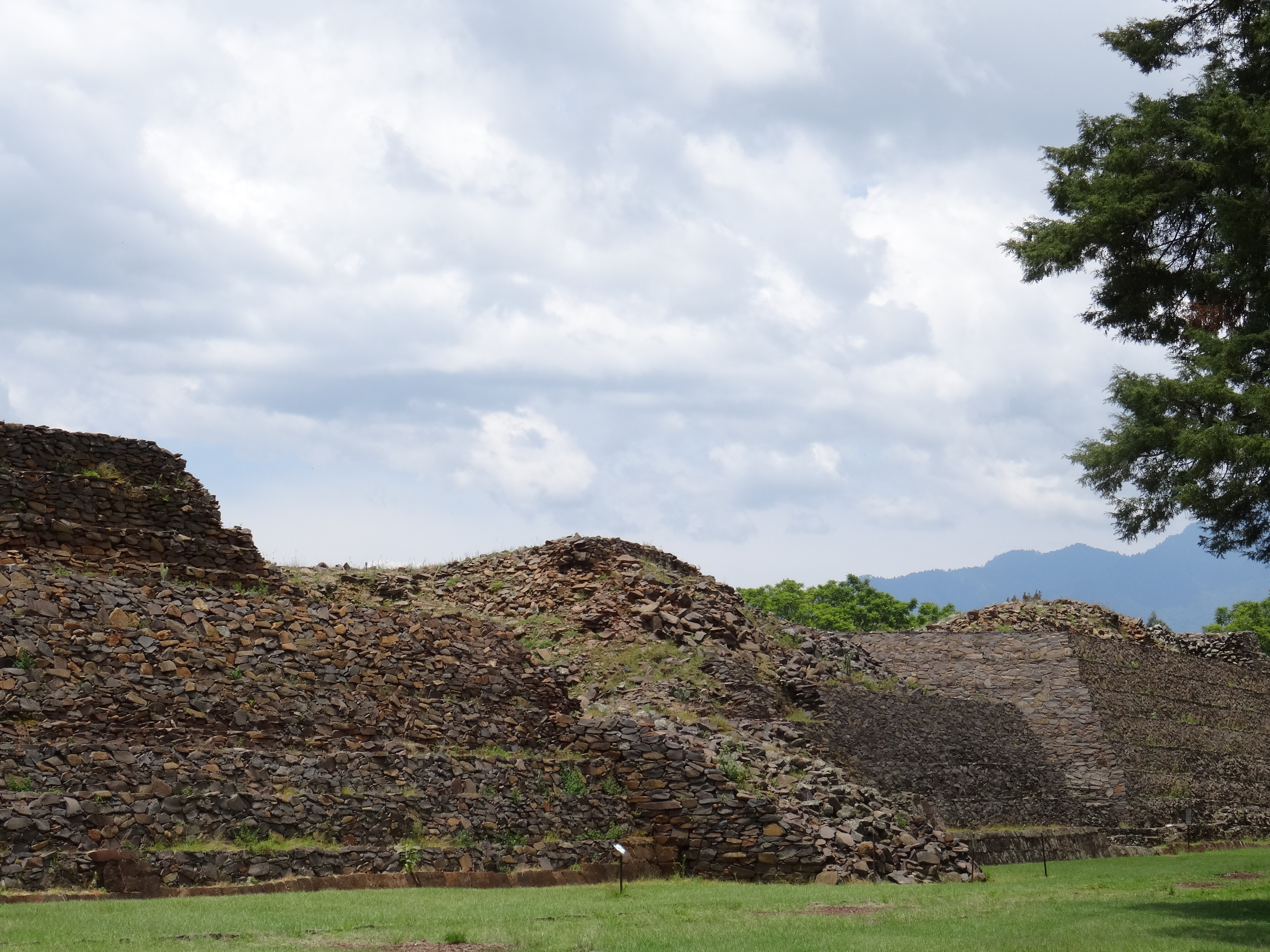
Tzintzuntzan

=== UNESCO World Heritage Sites ===
UNESCO has designated a number of World Heritage Sites; Mexico has a significant number. Numbered sites: 1. Centro Histórico de la Ciudad de México; 2. Ciudad Universitaria; 3. Xochicalco; 4. Monasteries on the slopes of Popocatépetl; 5. Luis Barragan House and Studio; 6. Teotihuacan; 7. Monarch Butterfly Biosphere Reserve; 8. Aqueduct of Padre Tembleque

Legend: World Cultural Heritage Site; World Natural Heritage Site; World Cultural and Natural Heritage Site (Mixed)

Location of World Heritage Sites within Mexico.

== Beaches ==
- Acapulco, Guerrero
- Cabo San Lucas, Baja California Sur
- Cancún, Quintana Roo
- Ensenada, Baja California
- Altamira, Tamaulipas
- Guaymas, Sonora
- Tampico, Tamaulipas
- Puerto Peñasco, Sonora
- Huatulco, Oaxaca
- Ixtapa, Guerrero
- Manzanillo, Colima
- Mazatlán, Sinaloa
- Mazunte, Oaxaca
- Playa del Carmen, Quintana Roo
- Puerto Escondido, Oaxaca
- Puerto Vallarta, Jalisco
- San José del Cabo, Baja California Sur
- Progreso, Yucatan
- Zipolite, Oaxaca

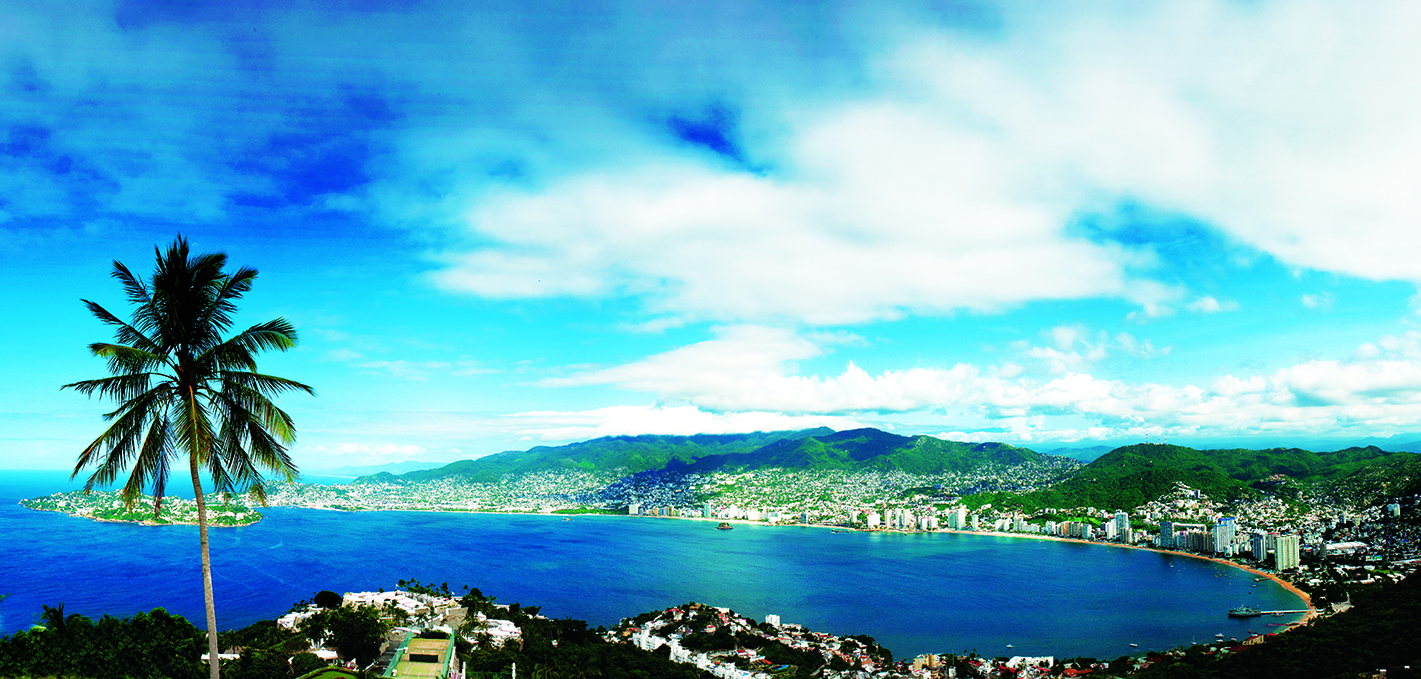
Acapulco Bay

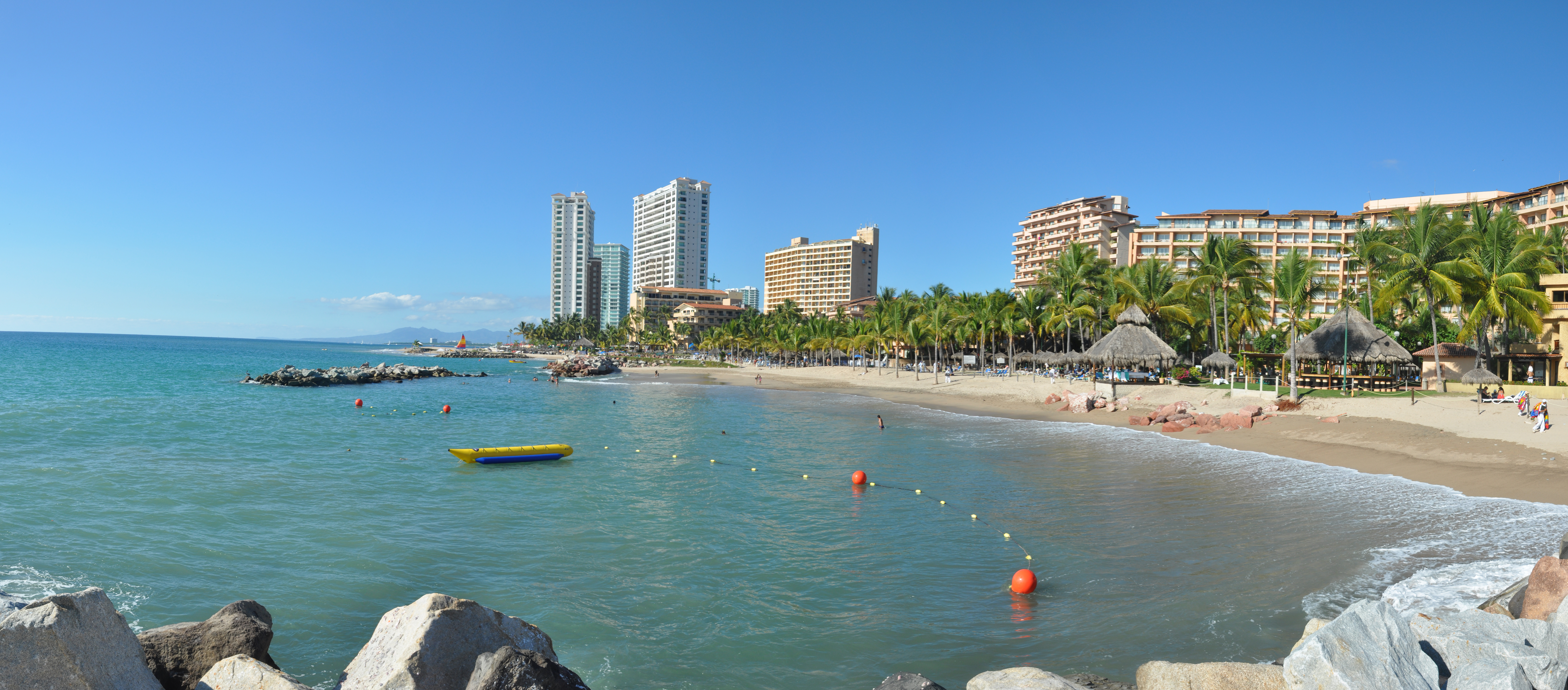
Puerto Vallarta

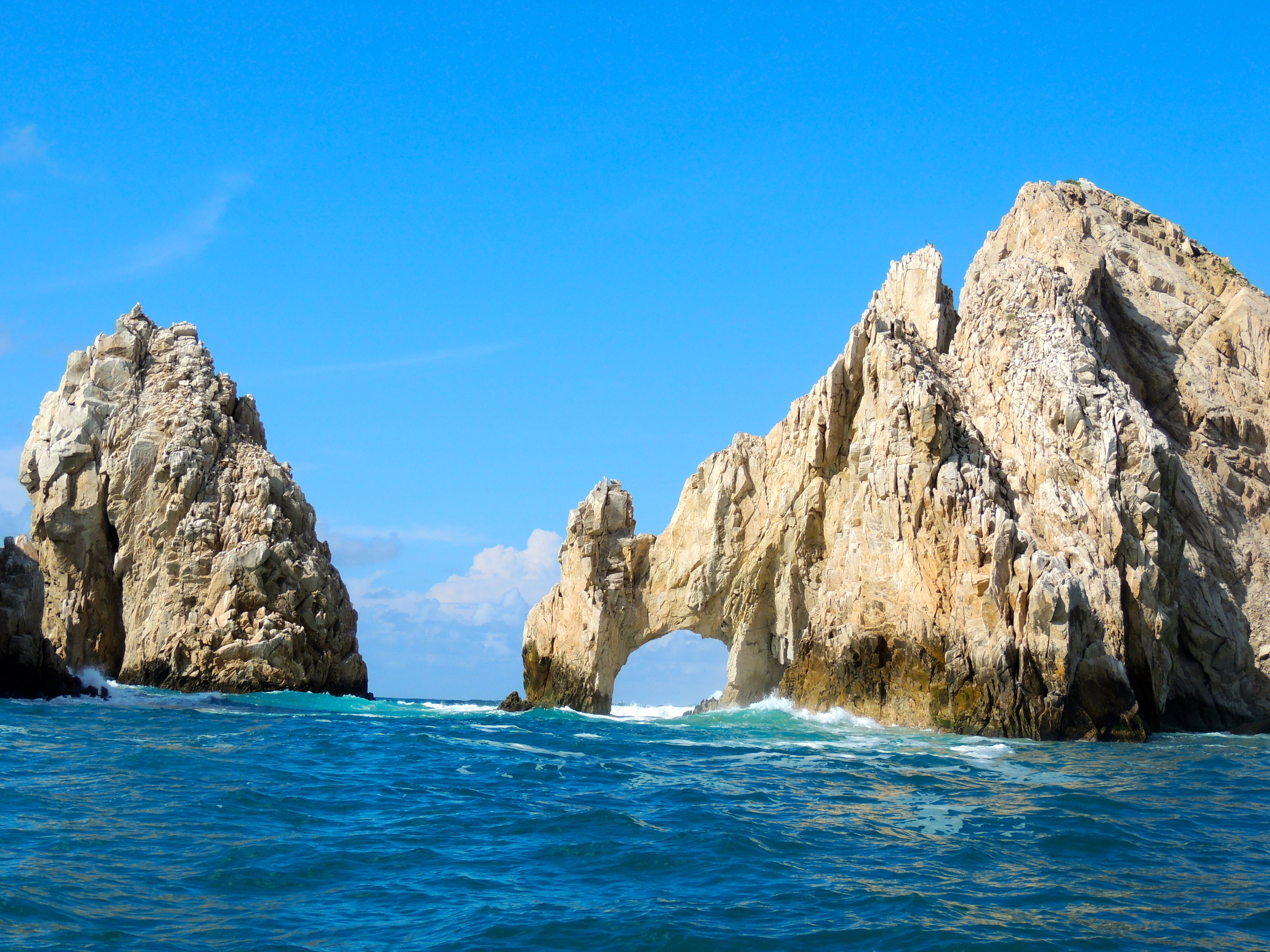
Cabo San Lucas

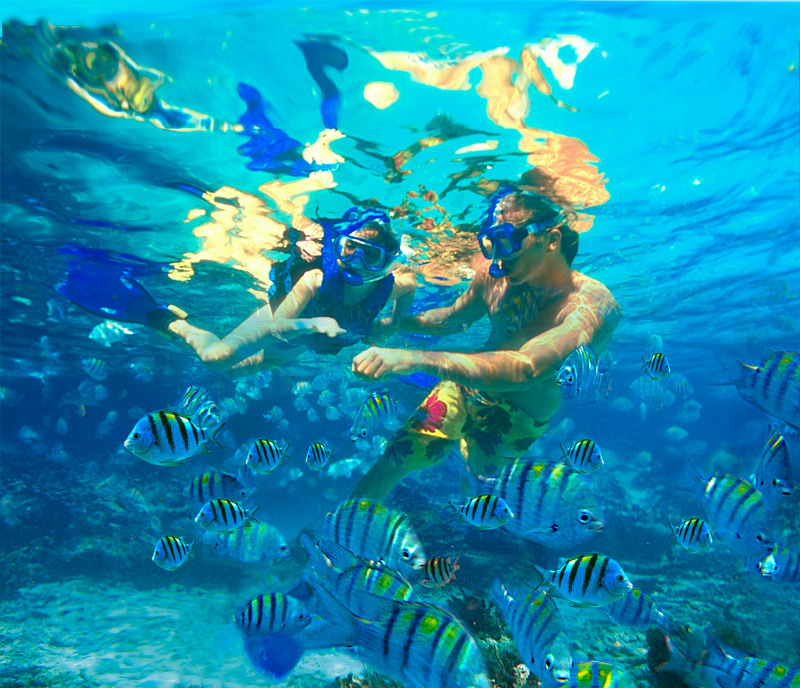
The clear waters of Xel-Ha beach

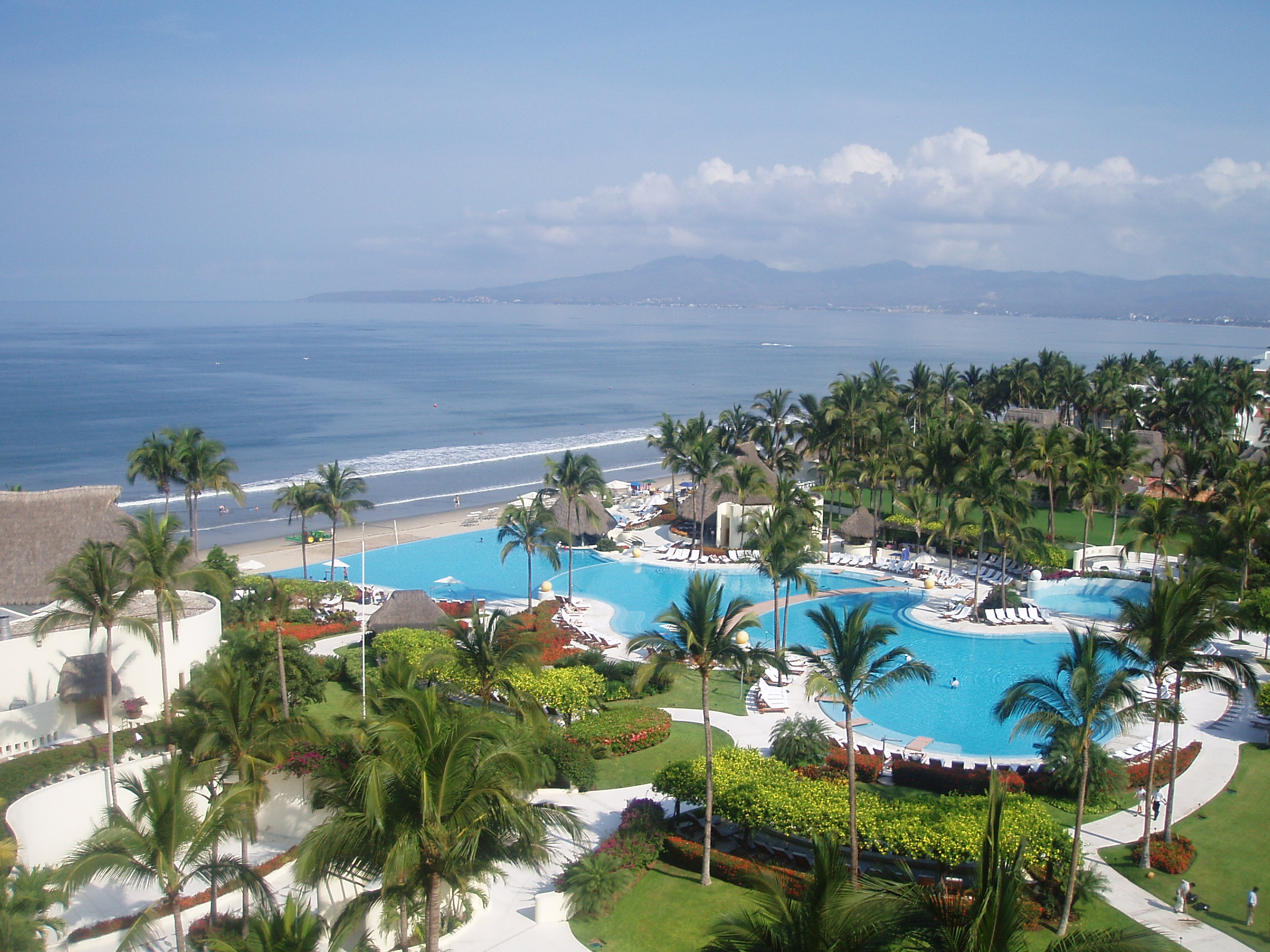
Nuevo Vallarta

The coastlines of Mexico harbor many stretches of beaches that are frequented by sun bathers and other visitors. On the Yucatán peninsula, one of the most popular beach destinations is the resort town of Cancún and its Hotel Zone, especially among university students during spring break. Just offshore is the beach island of Isla Mujeres, and to the east is the Isla Holbox. To the south of Cancun is the coastal strip called Riviera Maya which includes the beach town of Playa del Carmen and the ecological parks of Xcaret and Xel-Há. A day trip to the south of Cancún is the historic port of Tulum. In addition to its beaches, the town of Tulum is notable for its cliff-side Mayan ruins.

On the Pacific coast is the notable tourist destination of Acapulco. The beaches have become crowded and the shores are now home to many multi-story hotels and vendors. Acapulco is home to renowned cliff divers: trained divers who leap from the side of a vertical cliff into the surf below.

Along the coast to the south of Acapulco are the surfing beaches of Puerto Escondido, the snorkeling, harbor beach of Puerto Ángel, and the naturist beaches of Zipolite. To the north of Acapulco is the resort town of Ixtapa and the neighboring fishing town of Zihuatanejo. Further to the north are the wild and rugged surfing beaches of the Michoacán coast.

Along the central and north Pacific coast, the biggest draws are beaches of Mazatlán city and the resort town of Puerto Vallarta. Less frequented is the sheltered cove of Bahía de Navidad, the beach towns of Bahía Kino, and the black sands of Cuyutlán. San Carlos, home of the Playa los Algodones (Cotton Beach), is a winter draw, especially for retirees.

At the southern tip of the Baja California peninsula is the resort town of Cabo San Lucas, a town noted for its beaches and marlin fishing. Further north along the Gulf of California is the Bahía de La Concepción, another beach town known for its sports fishing. Closer to the United States border is the weekend draw of San Felipe, Baja California.

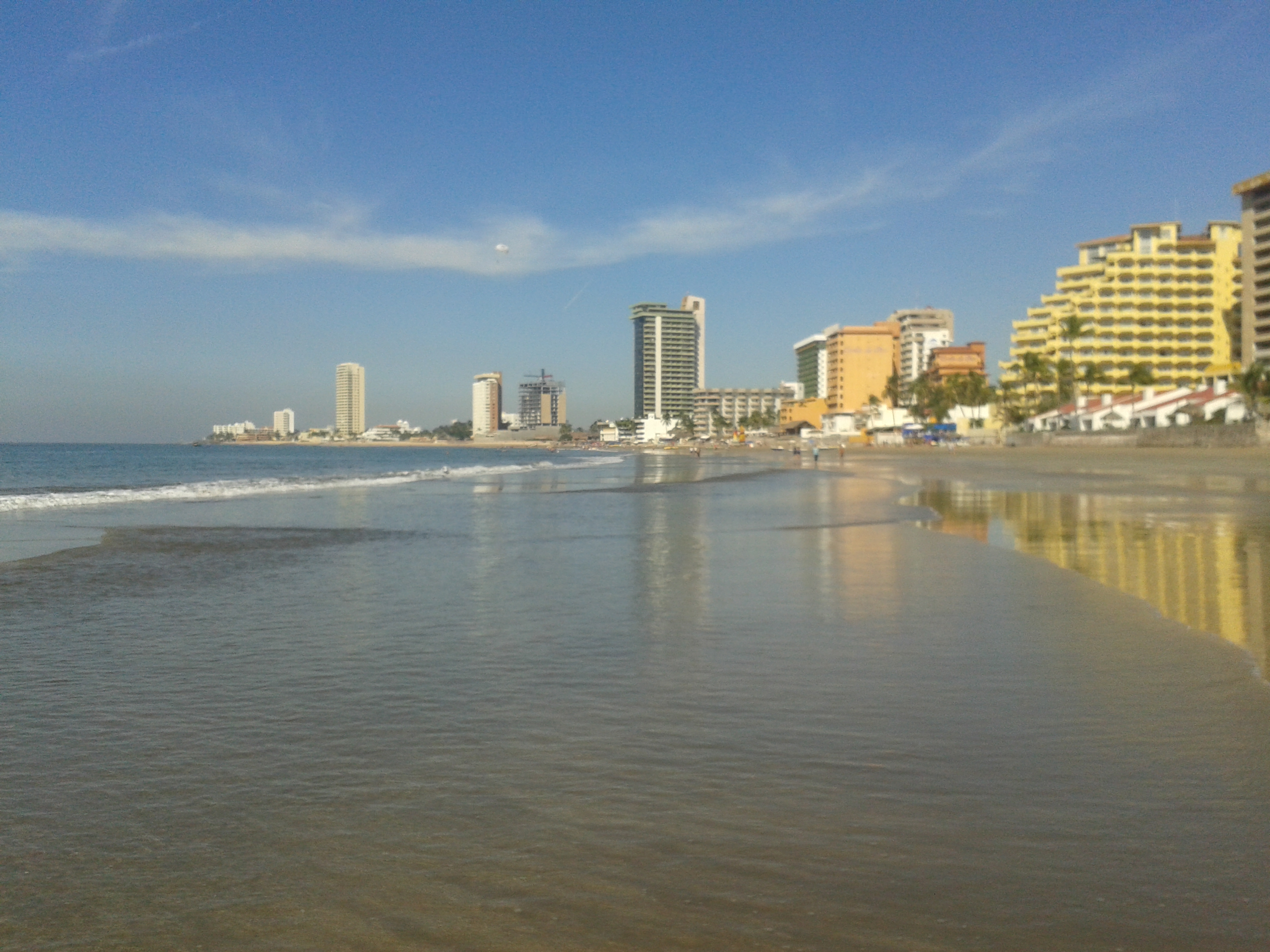
Mazatlán.

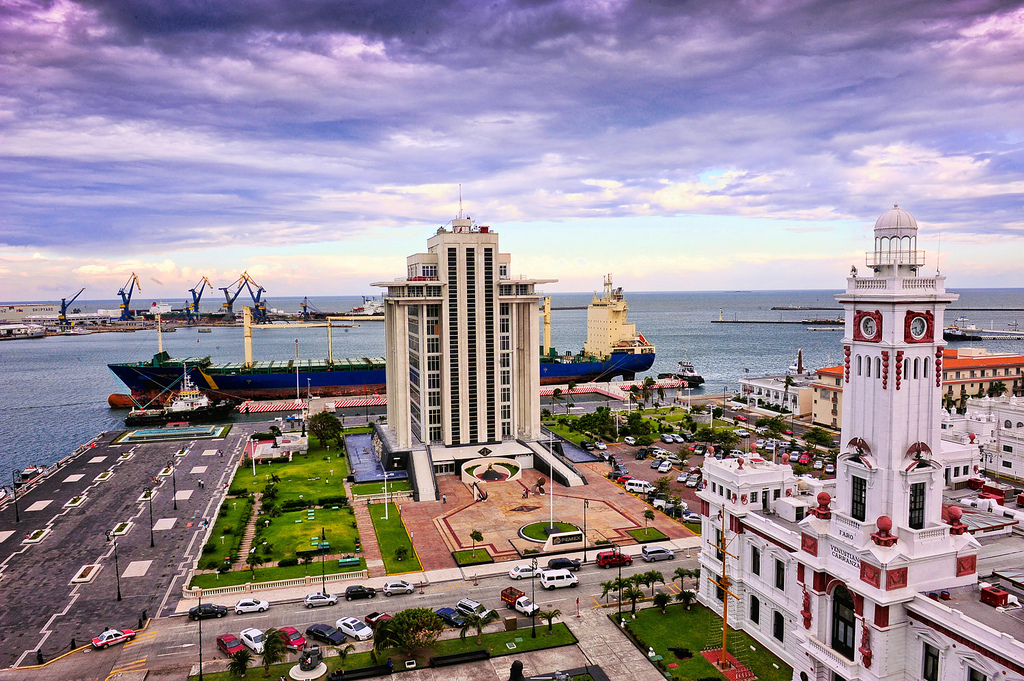
Veracruz.

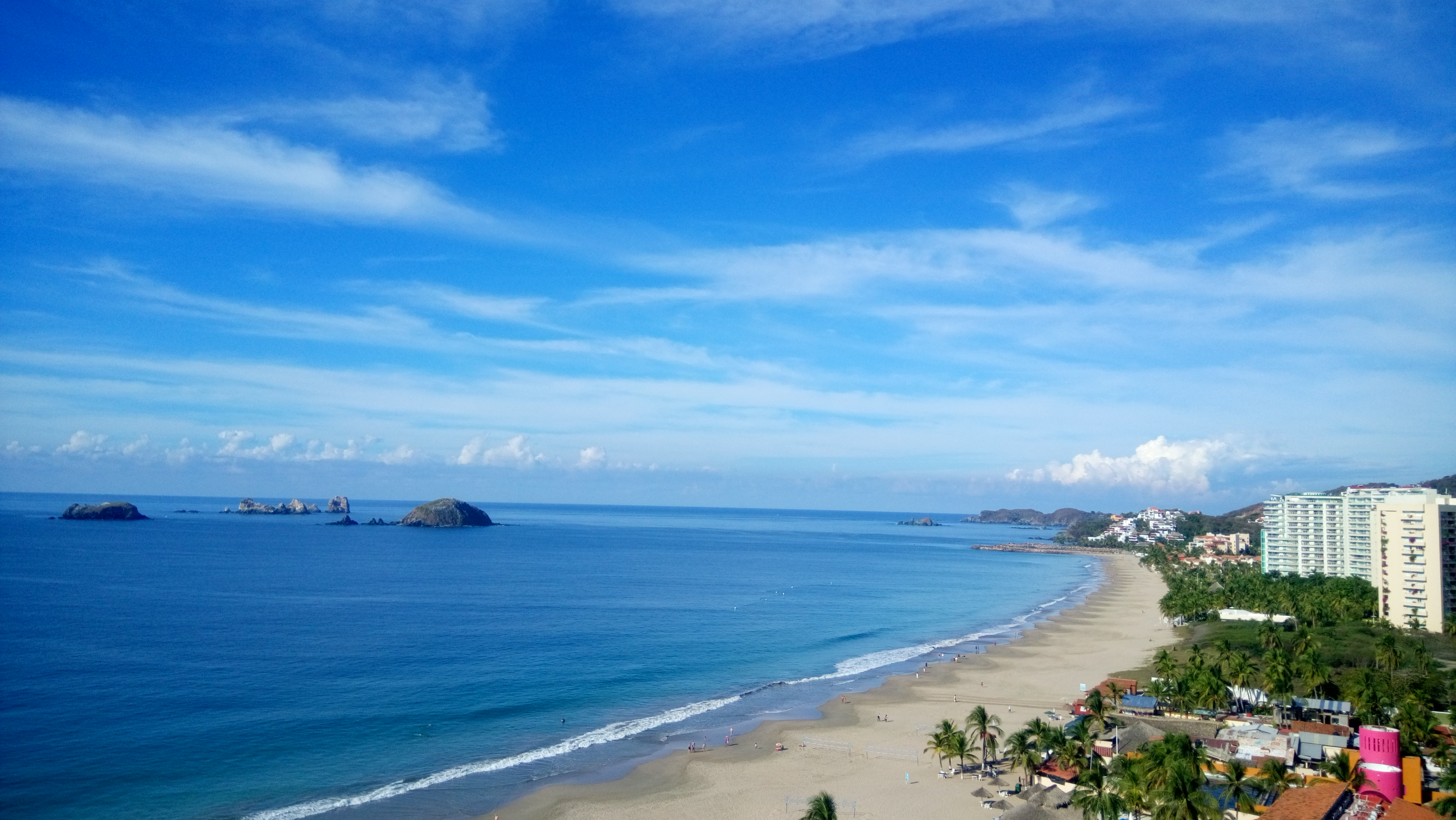
Ixtapa - Zihuatanejo.

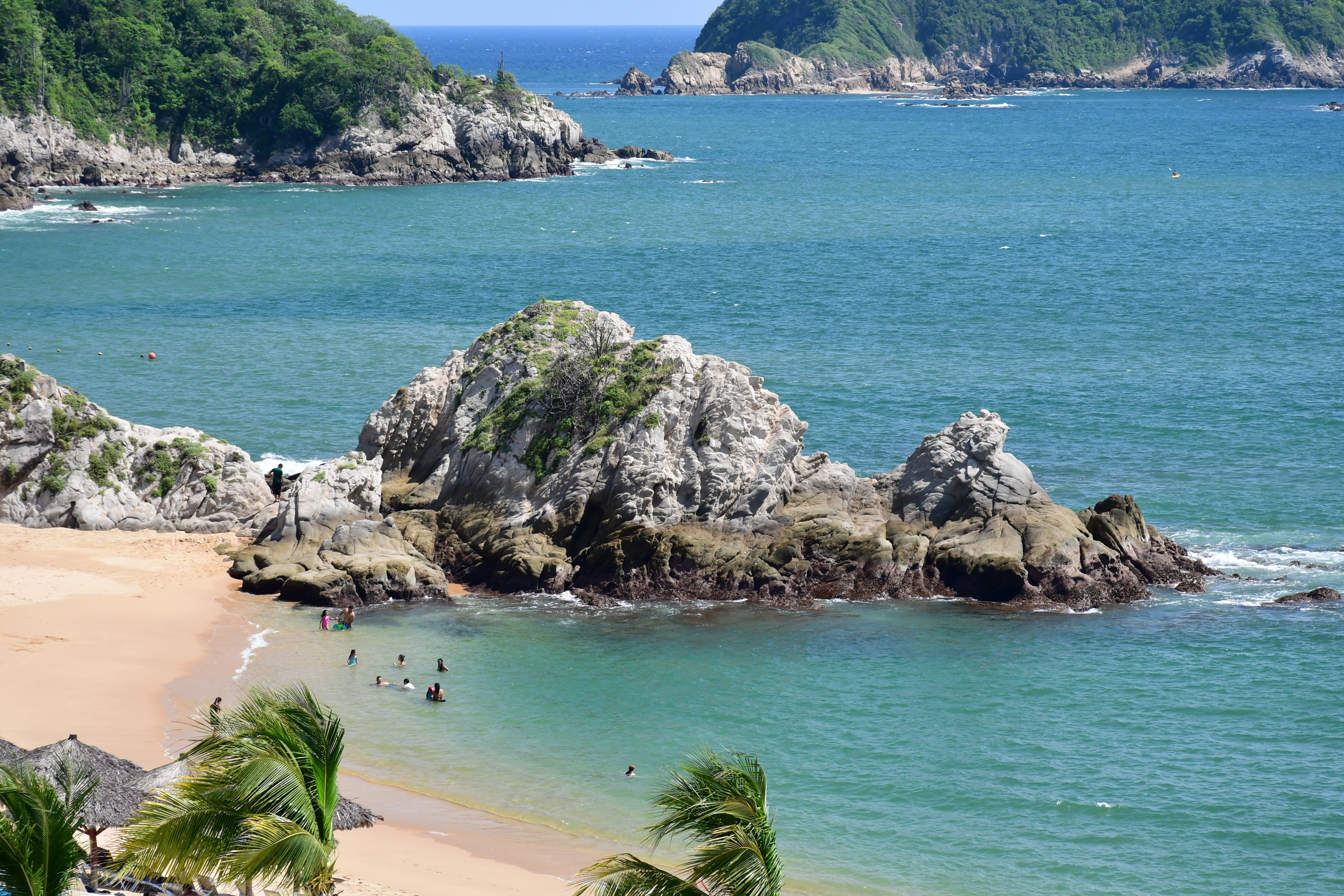
Santa María Huatulco.

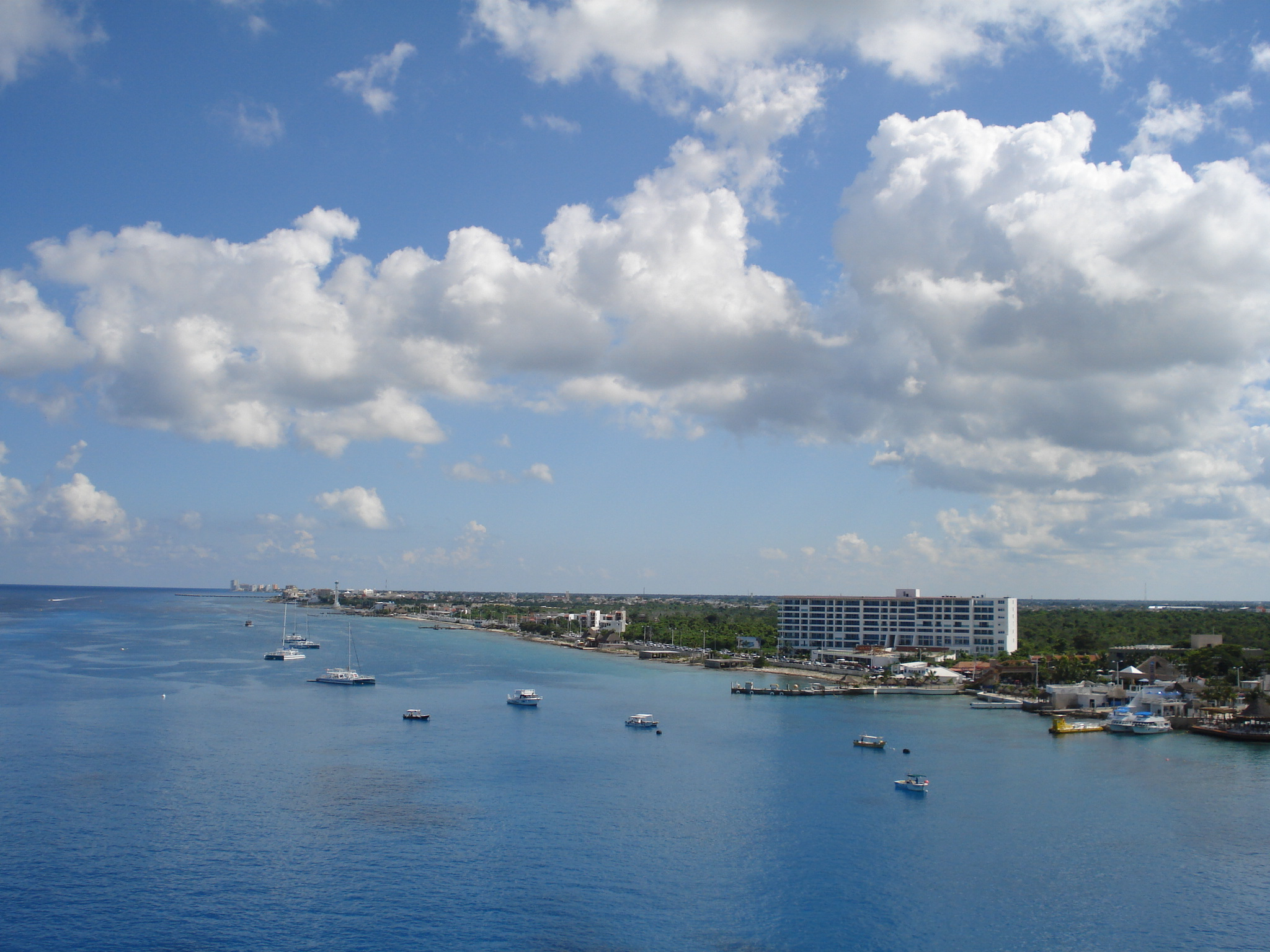
Cozumel.

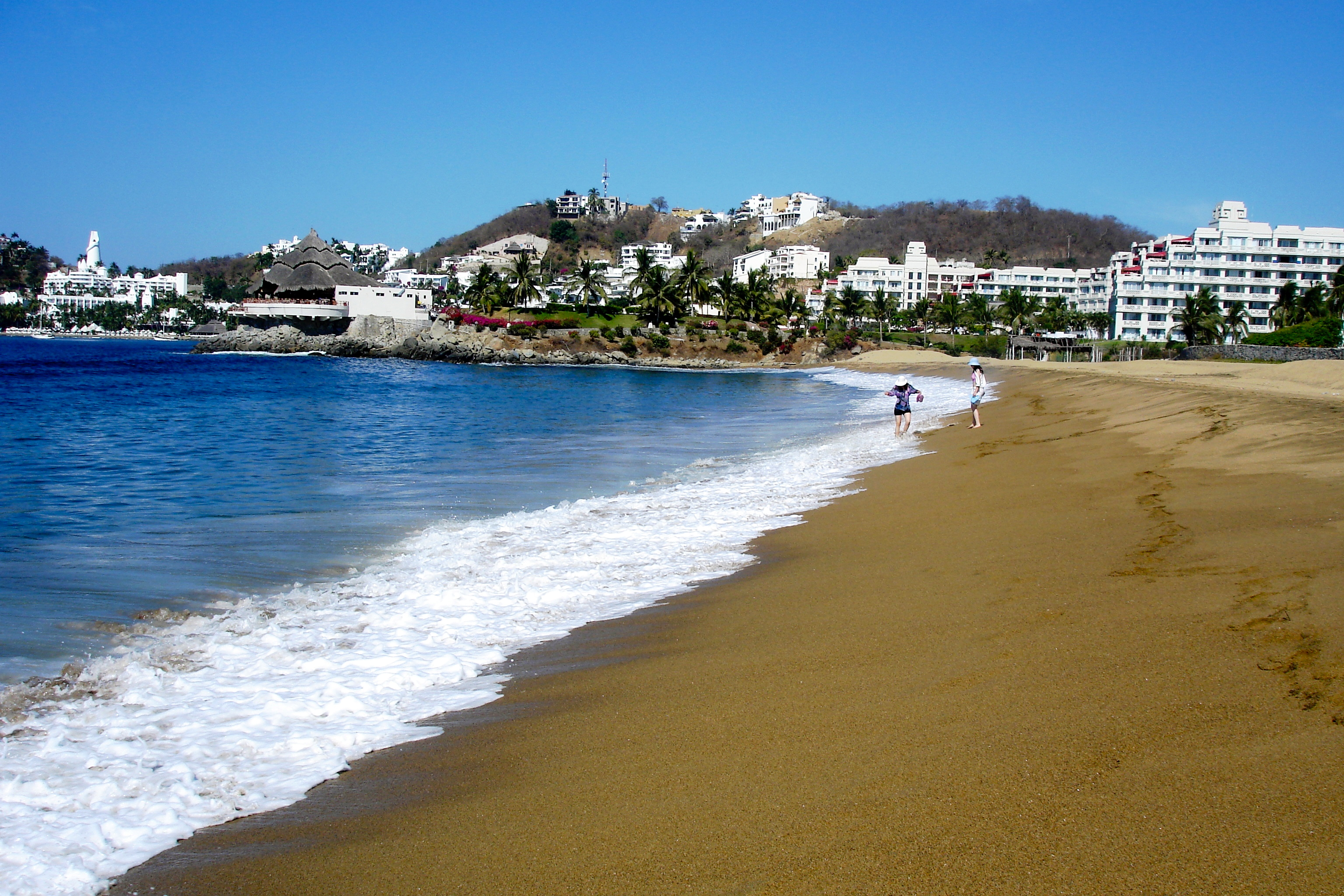
Manzanillo.

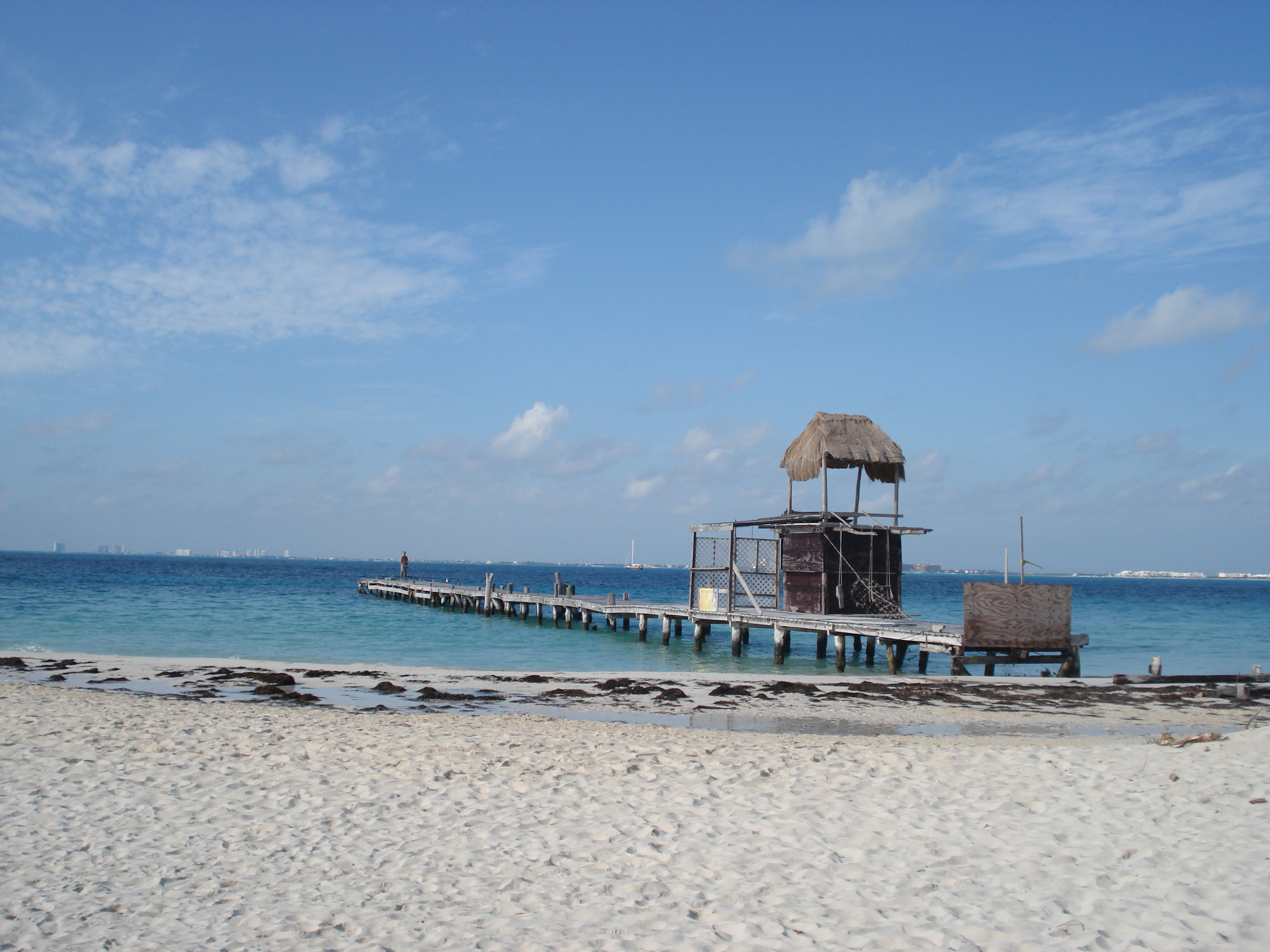
Isla Mujeres.

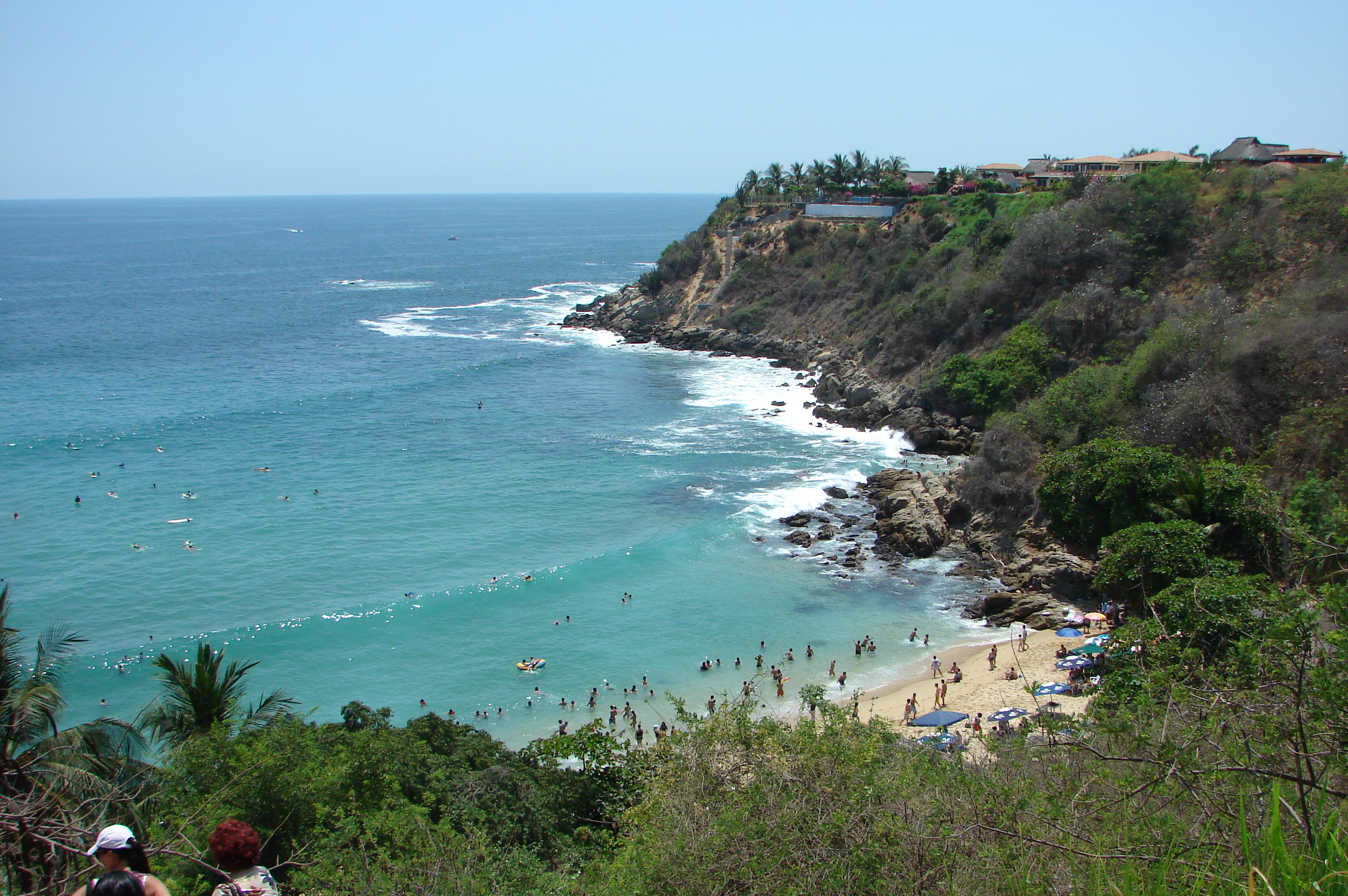
Puerto Escondido.

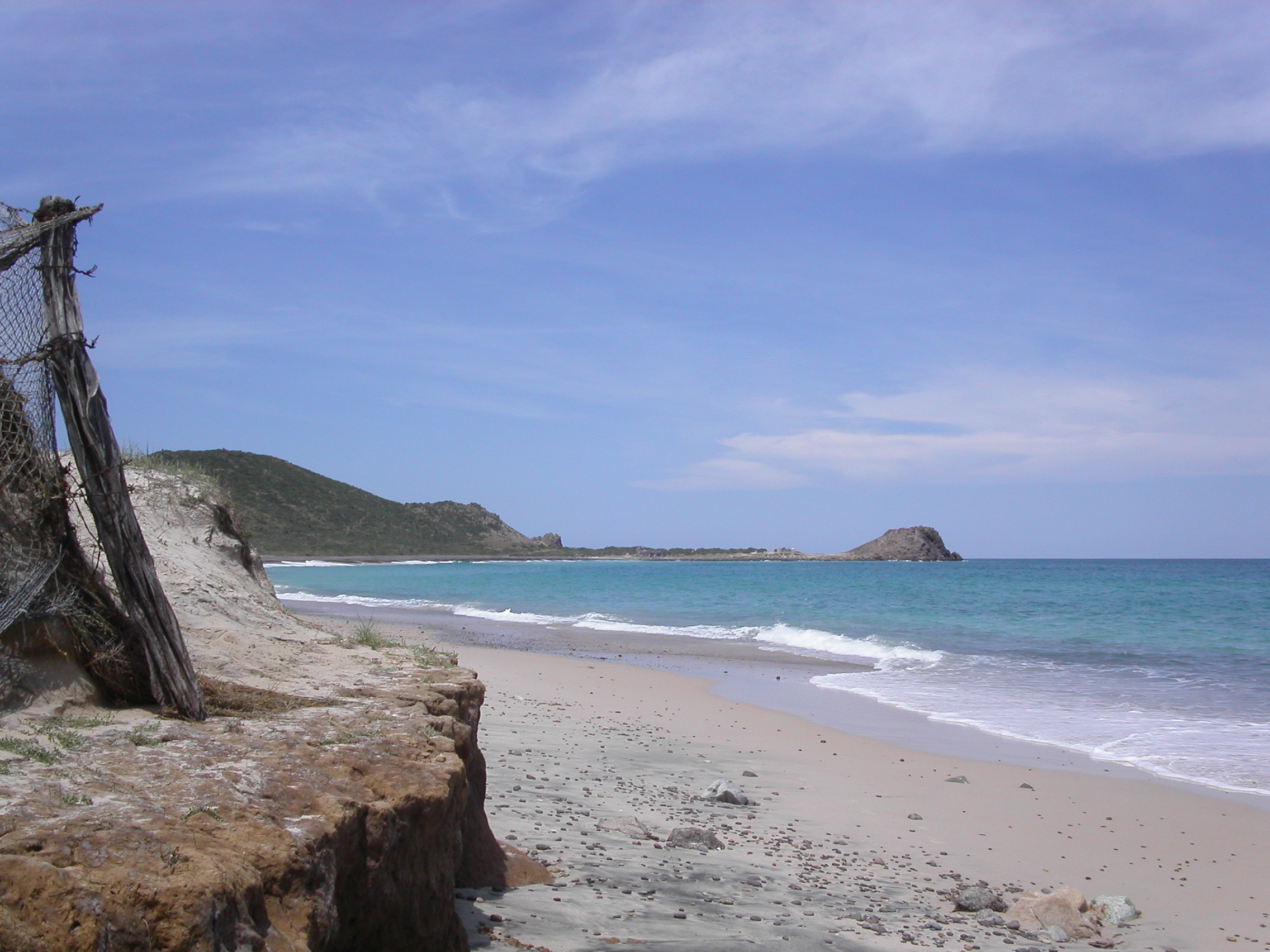
Los Mochis.

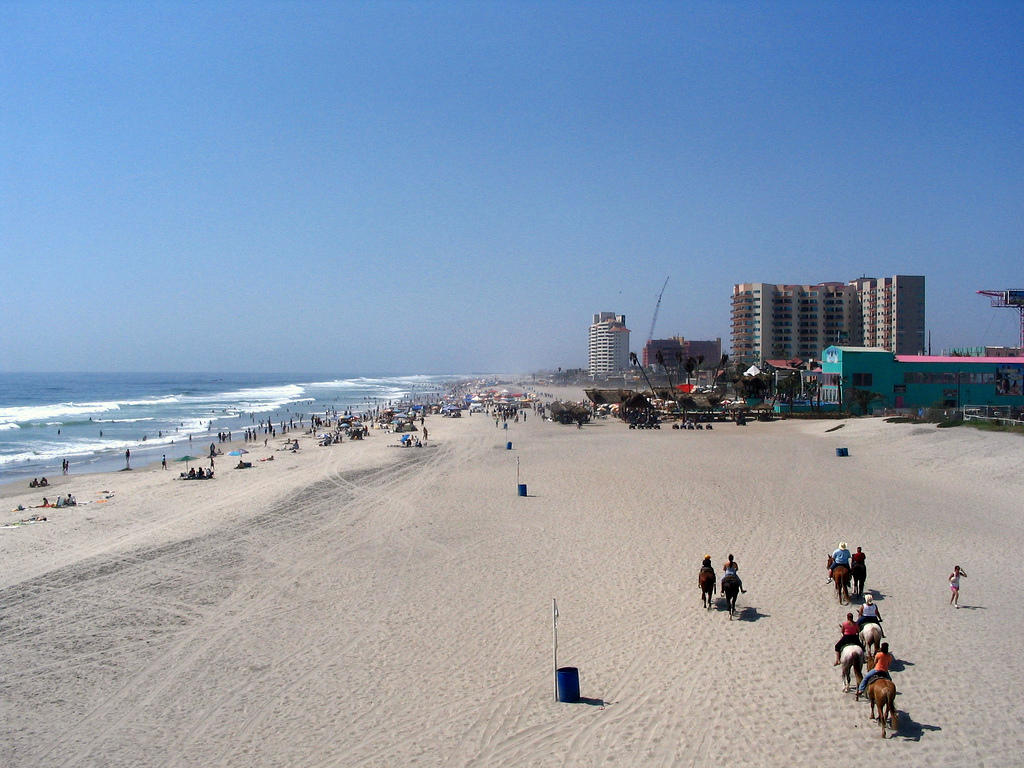
Rosarito.

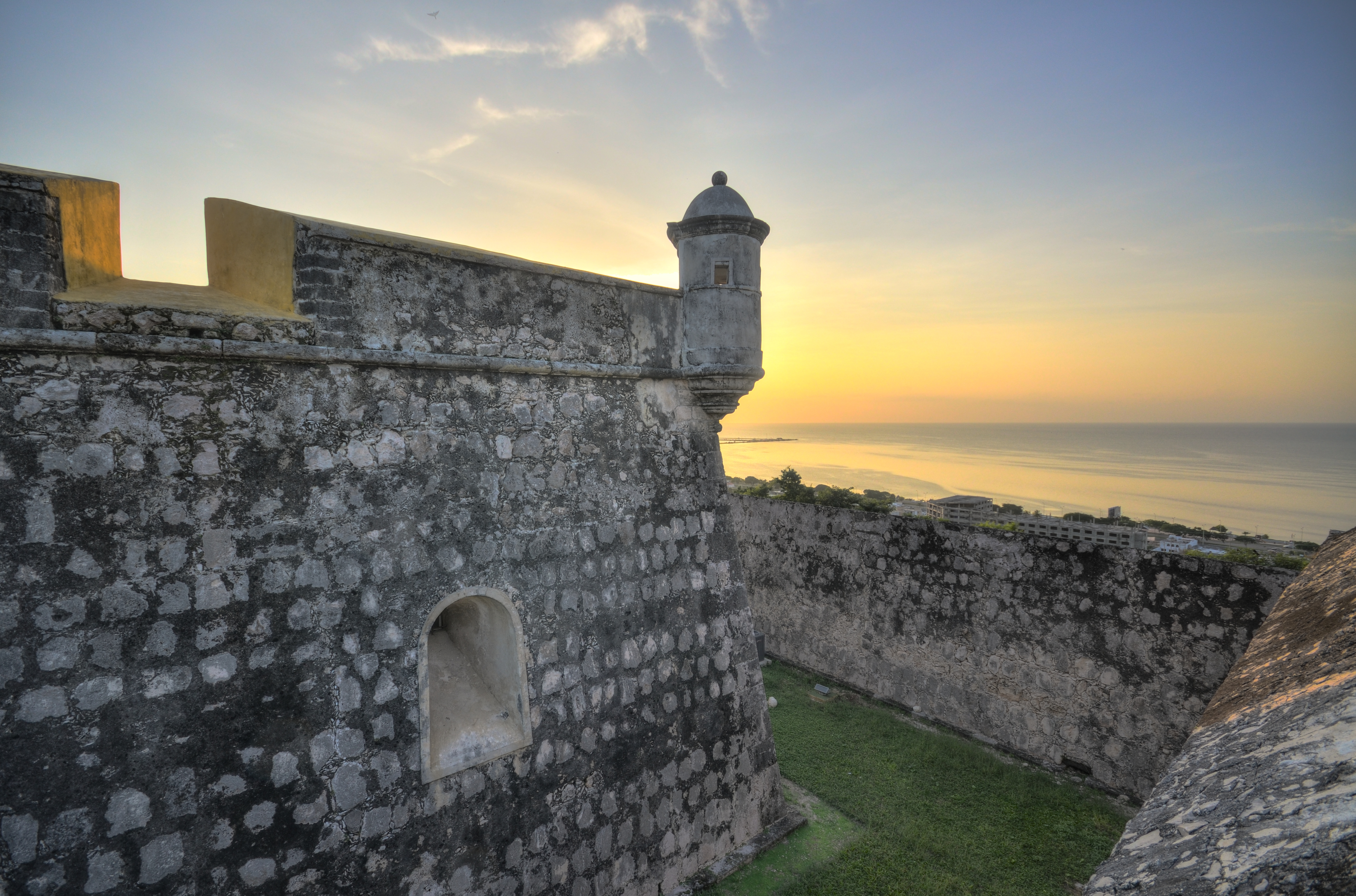
San Francisco de Campeche.

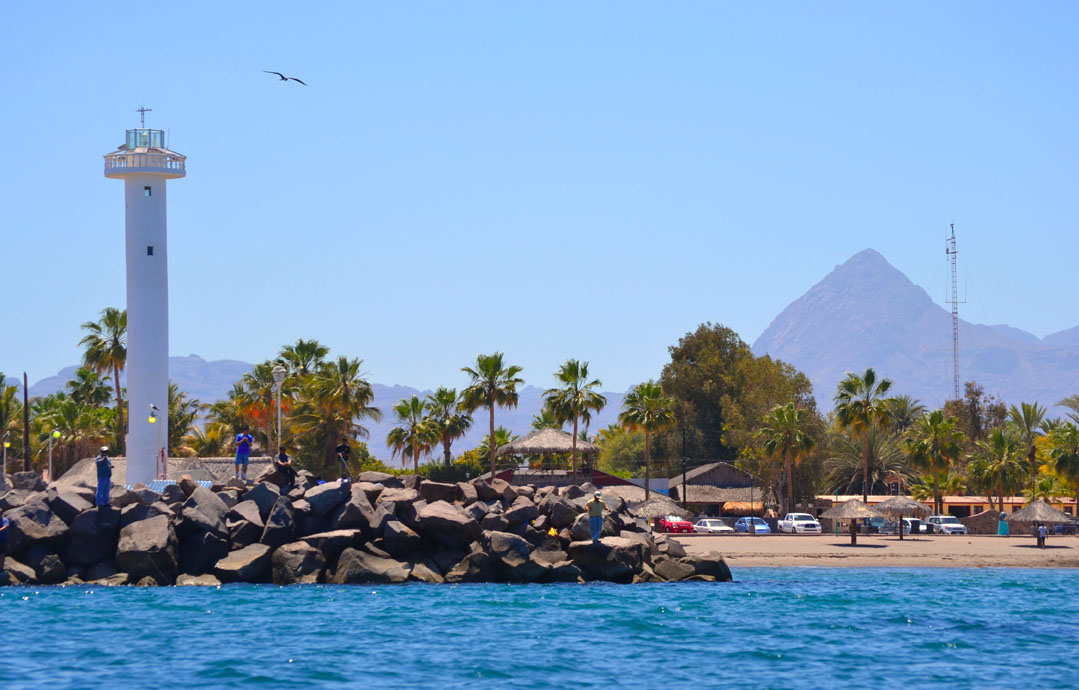
Loreto.

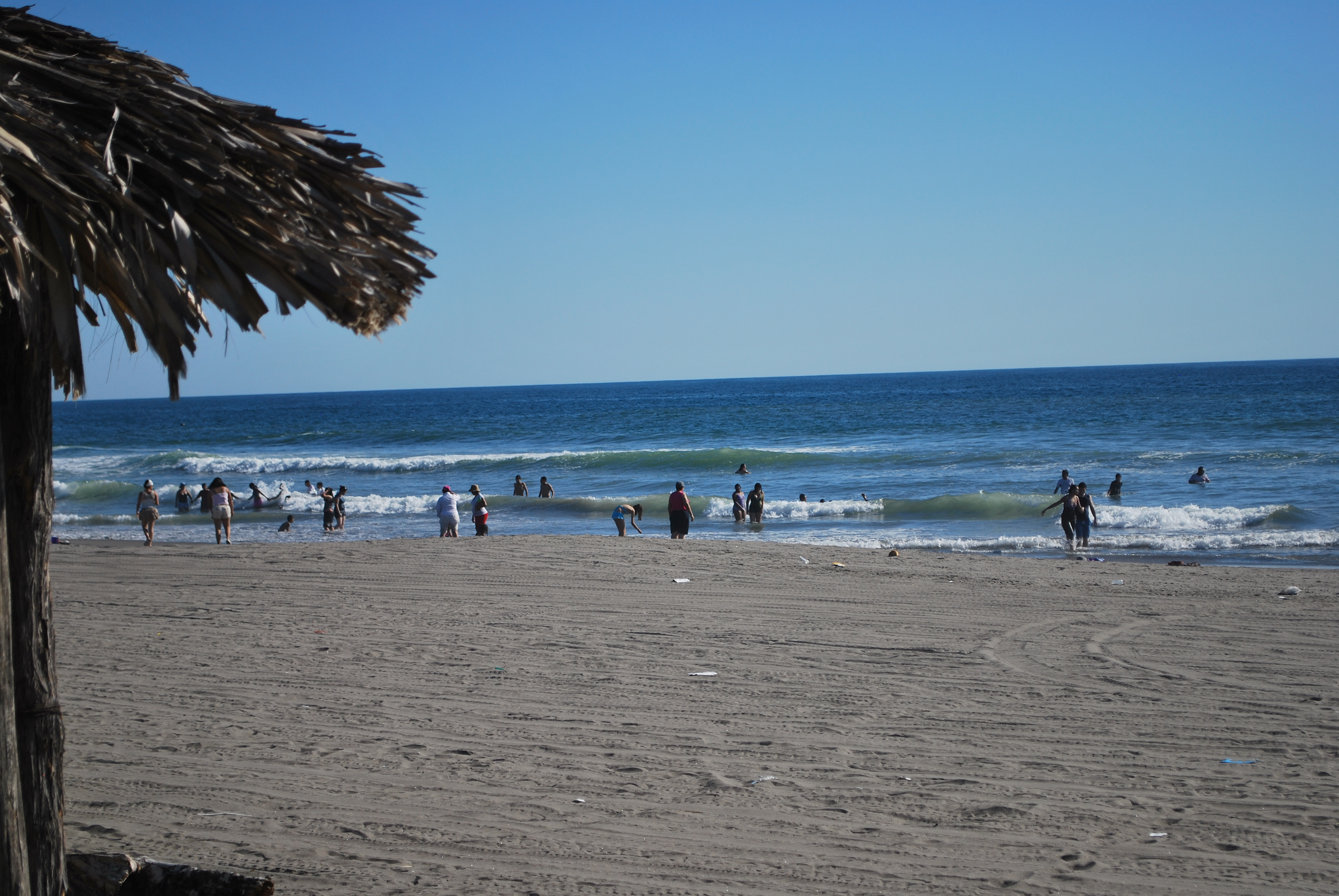
Tonalá - Puerto Arista.

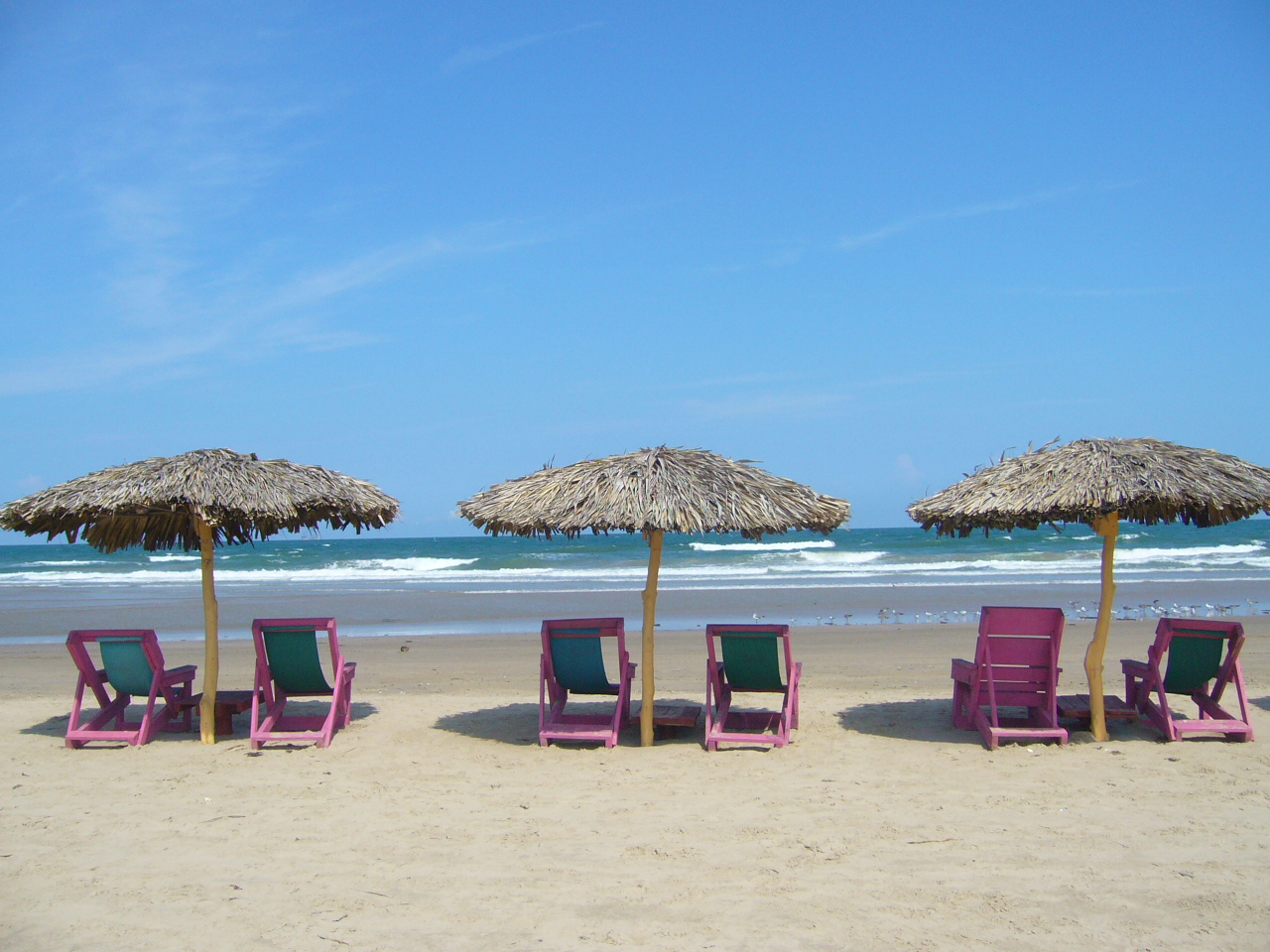
Tampico - Ciudad Madero.

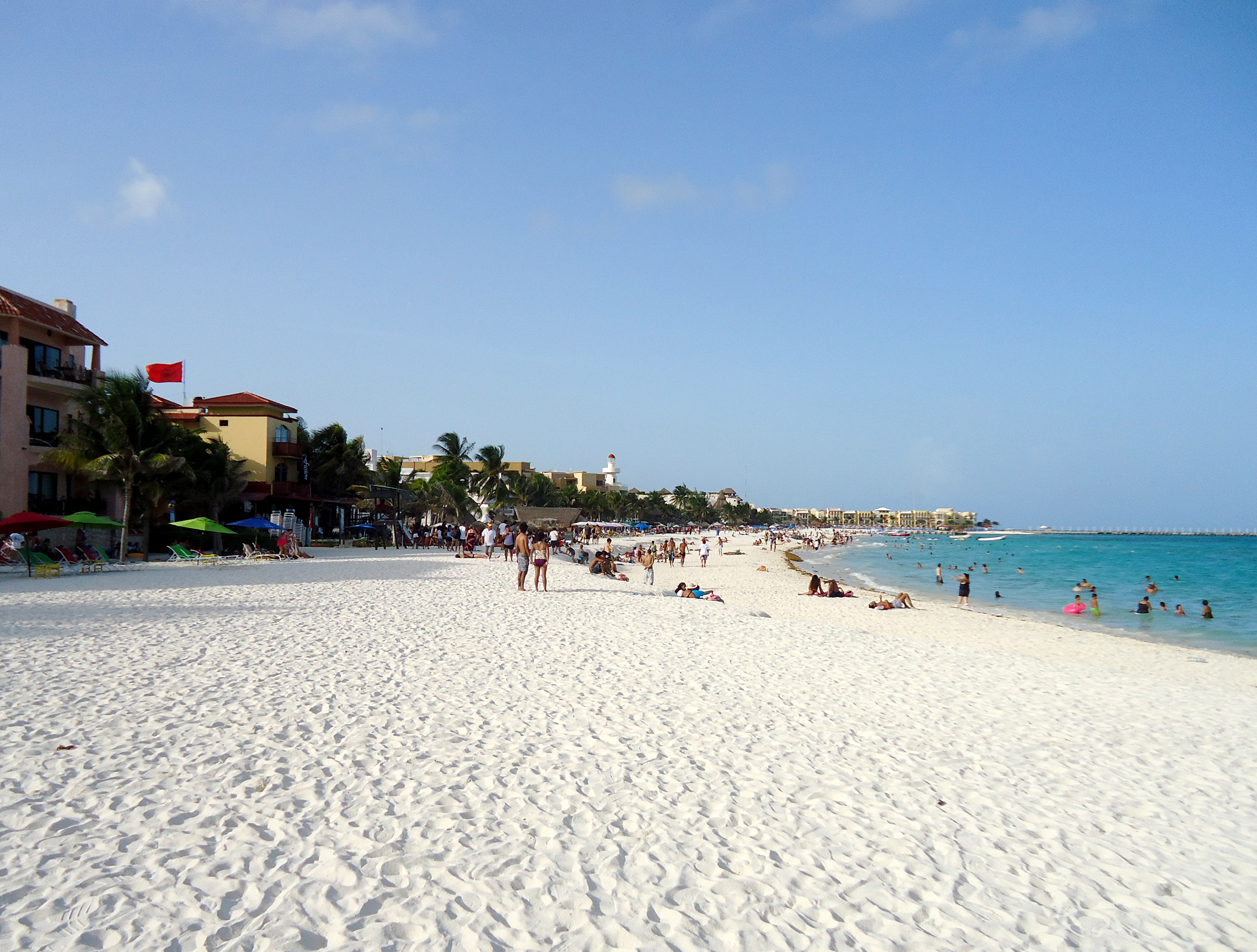
Stranda and Playa del Carmen in Quintana Roo.

== Festivals and celebrations ==
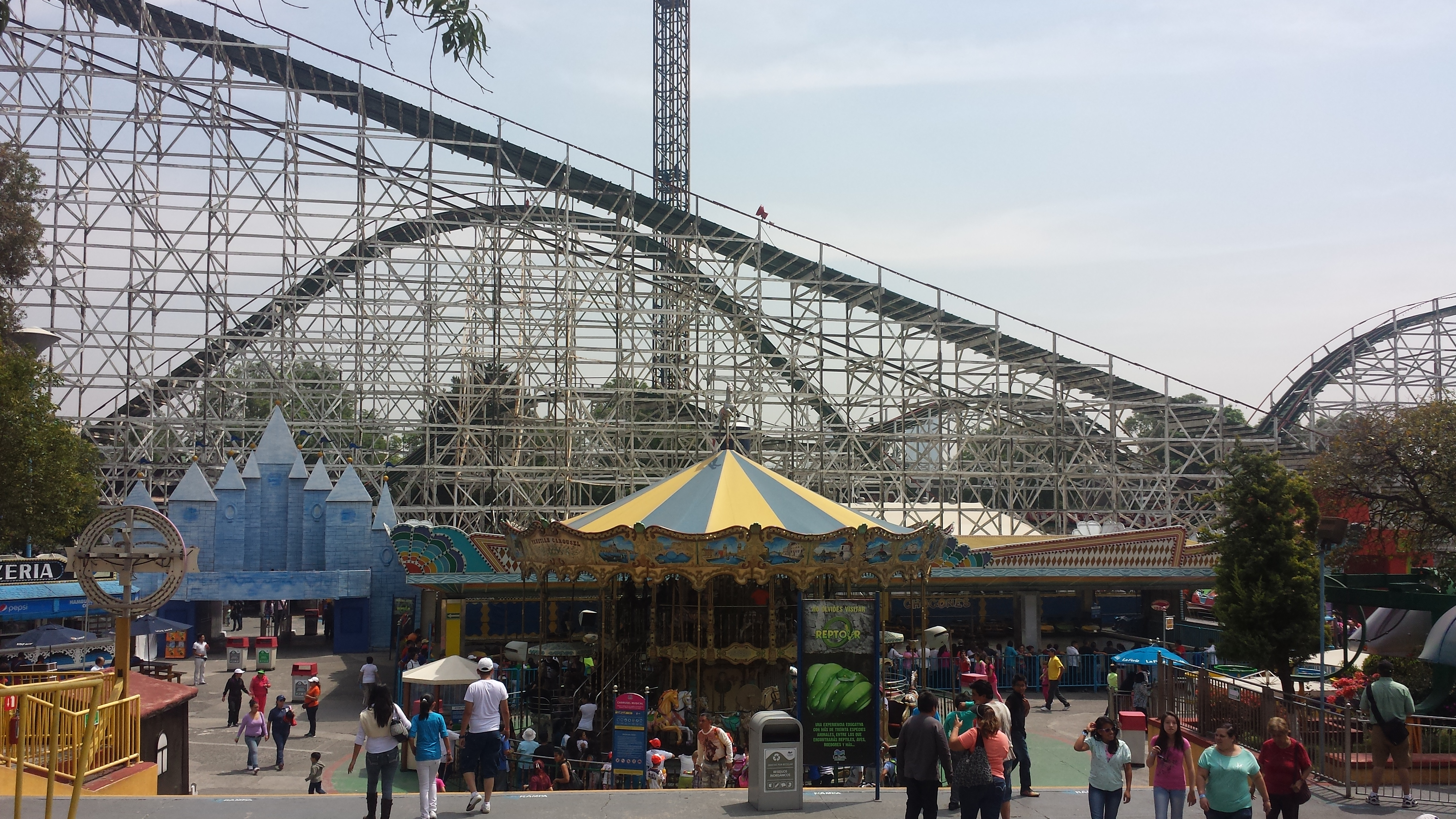
La Feria de Chapultepec (Chapultepec Fair)

Mexico has many religious and civic festivals as well as cultural festivals of various kinds.

Since the colonial era, the Roman Catholic Church established a number of festivals, both general and local, celebrating events on the liturgical calendar. Holy Week in Mexico is observed widely, with many re-enactments of events in the last days of the life of Christ. The Christmas season runs for 12 December, the feast day of the Virgin of Guadalupe to 6 January, the Feast of the Ephiphany, also known as Three Kings. There are many local religious celebrations by towns, often on the saint's day for which they were named.

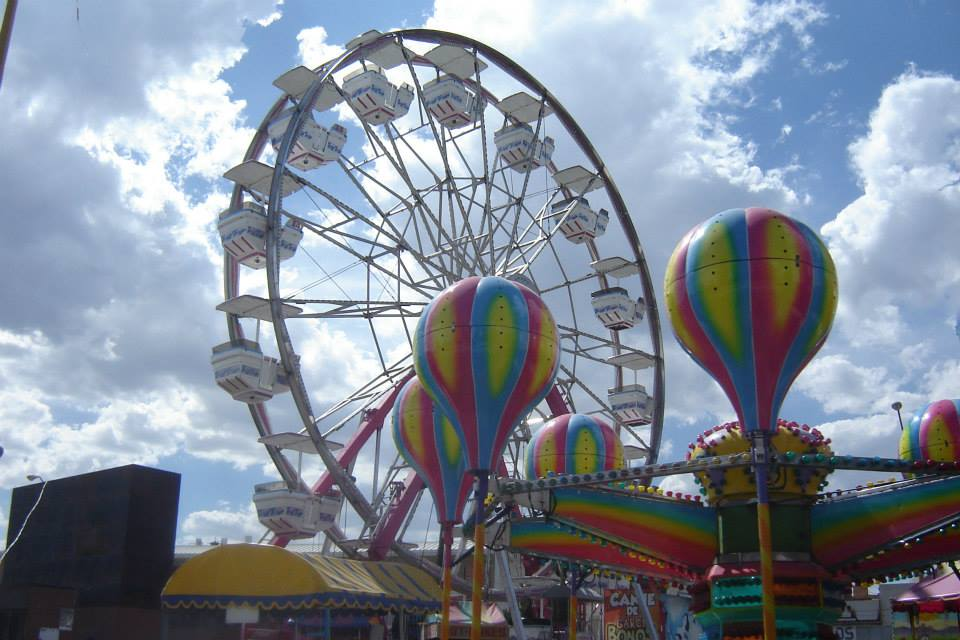
Attractions at the 2014 Feria Nacional de San Marcos

Food and drink festivals include the Alfeñique fair in Toluca; the Feria Nacional de San Marcos in Aguascalientes; the International Pasty Festival in Real del Monte, Hidalgo state; the Night of the Radishes (23 December) Oaxaca, and the Puerto Vallarta Gourmet Festival.

A major gathering of Spanish-language booksellers is the annual Guadalajara International Book Fair. The International Cervantes Festival is held annually in Guanajuato. In Oaxaca, the Oaxaca International Literary Competition and the Oaxaca Independent Film Festival are events.

About 225 cities and towns celebrate carnvales before Lent in late February or early March. The largest are in Mazatlán and the city of Veracruz, but such celebrations can be found all across the country: Morelos, Oaxaca, Tlaxcala, Chiapas, Campeche, and Puebla. The larger city "carnavales" employ costumes, elected queens, and parades with floats, but Carnaval celebrations in smaller and rural areas vary widely depending on the level of European influence during Mexico's colonial period.

== Ethnic cultural tourism ==
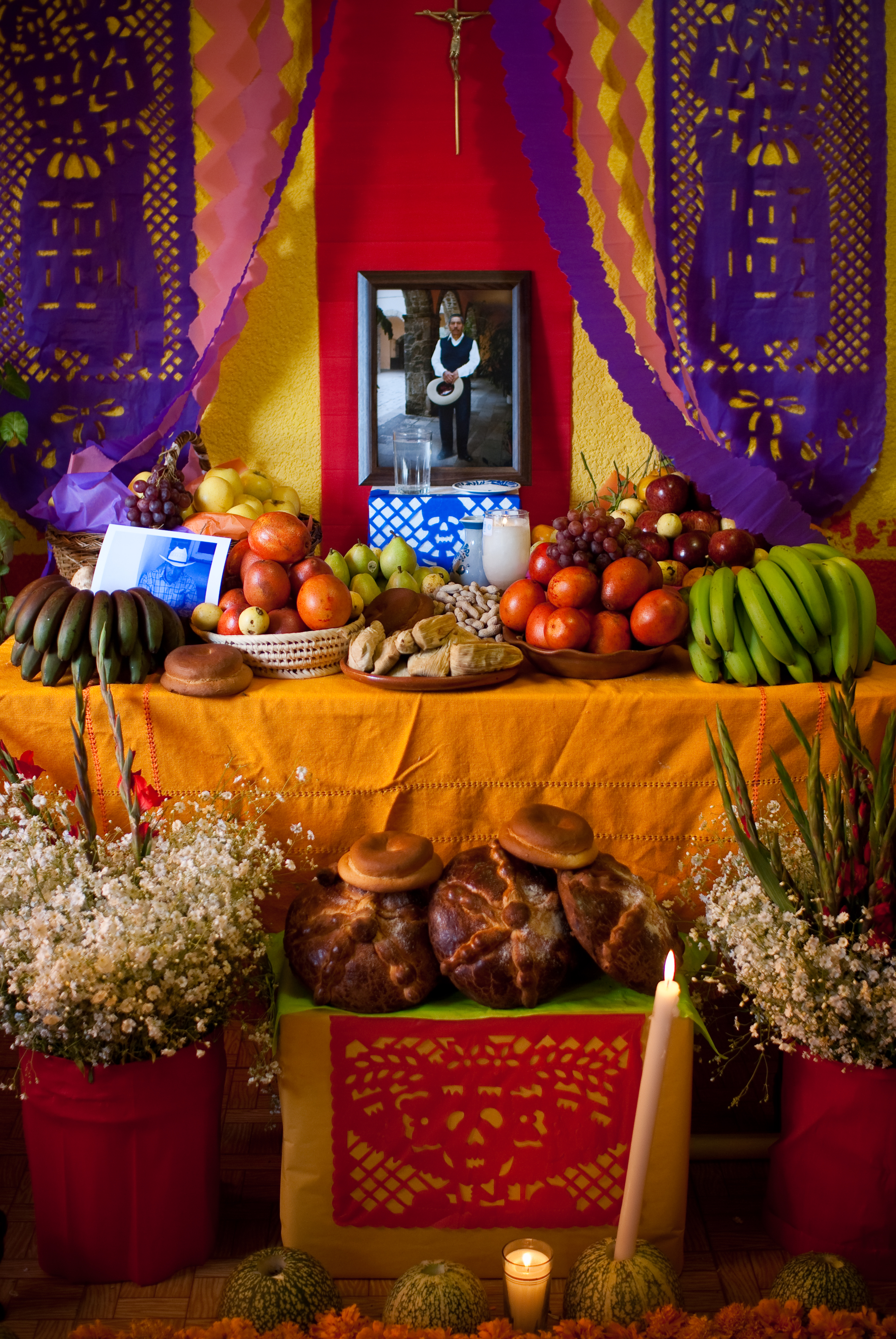
Day of the Dead altar

Tourists often also seek destinations with living indigenous cultures, such as in Oaxaca and Yucatan. Traditional markets in many small towns have a mixture of ordinary foodstuffs and supplies for the local populations, as well as market-sellers of craft goods that are locally produced. In the state of Oaxaca, various towns specialize in particular crafts, such as weaving of rugs (Teotitlan del Valle) and black pottery (Coyotepec). Some production of Mexican handcrafts and folk art is traditional, and is particularly practiced in Oaxaca, but some artisans respond to tourist demand crafting products for that market exclusively. The Guelaguetza, an annual festival of music and dance by indigenous communities in Oaxaca gives reinforcement of local traditions and deliberately seeks tourists as attendees, staged now in an amphitheater. Another event that is promoted touristically is Mexico's Days of the Dead at the beginning of November and has been listed as a protected cultural practice, entered on the UNESCO Intangible Cultural Heritage Lists. Towns with specialized crafts:

- San Pablito, Puebla (amate paper)
- Santa María Atzompa, Oaxaca (pottery)
- San Bartolo Coyotepec Oaxaca (pottery)
- Ocotlán, Oaxaca (pottery, blades)
- San Martín Tilcajete, Oaxaca (alebrijes)
- Santa Clara del Cobre, Michoacan (copper crafts)
- Teotitlán del Valle, Oaxaca (rugs)
- Temoaya, State of Mexico (rugs)
- Tlalpujahua, Michoacan (Christmas ornaments)
- Tlaquepaque, Jalisco (pottery)
- Tonalá, Jalisco (pottery, glass, etc.)
- Tenancingo, State of Mexico (rebozos, basketry, furniture)

=== Gallery of UNESCO Intangible Cultural Heritage in Mexico ===
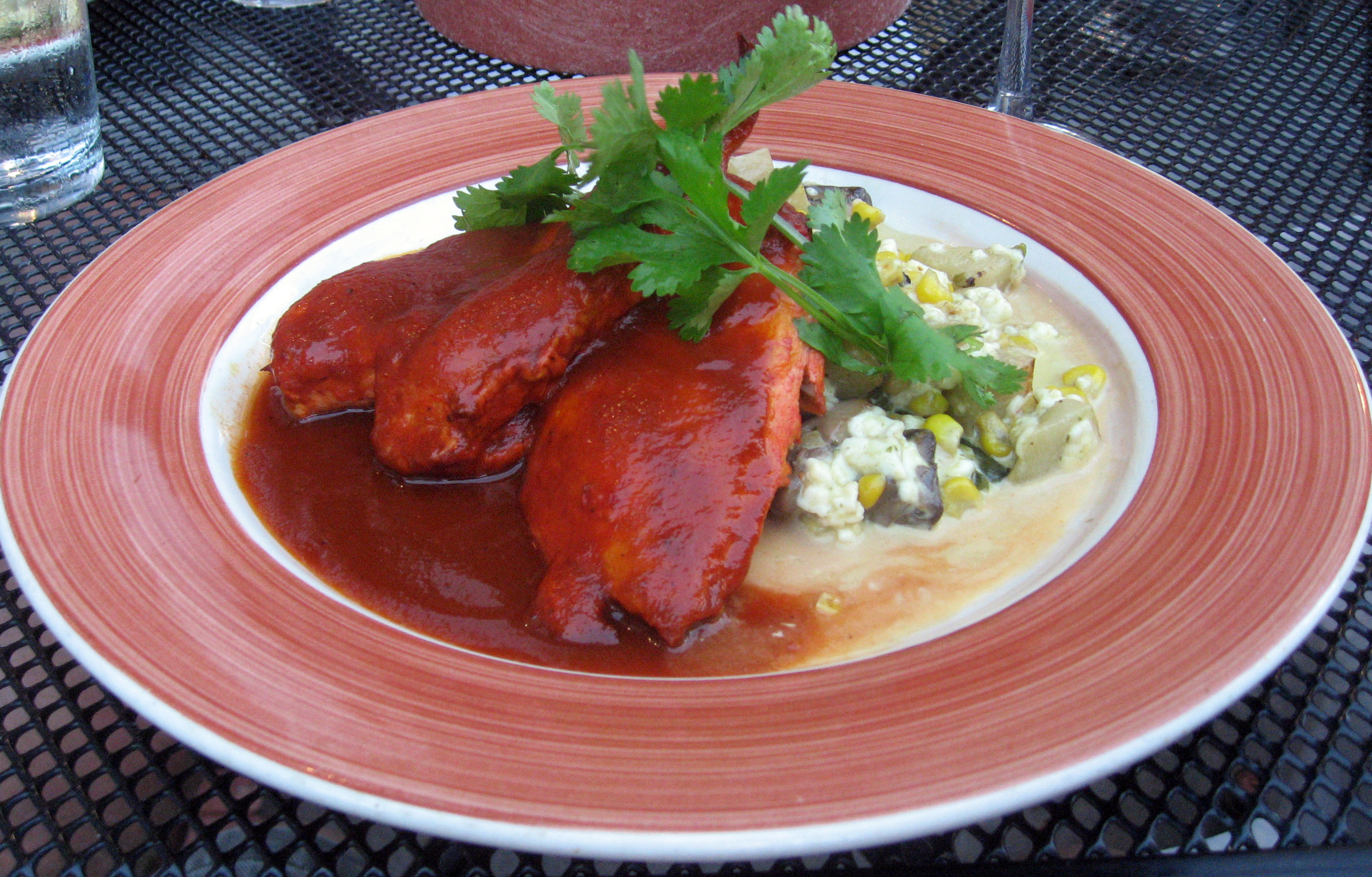
Mexican cuisine

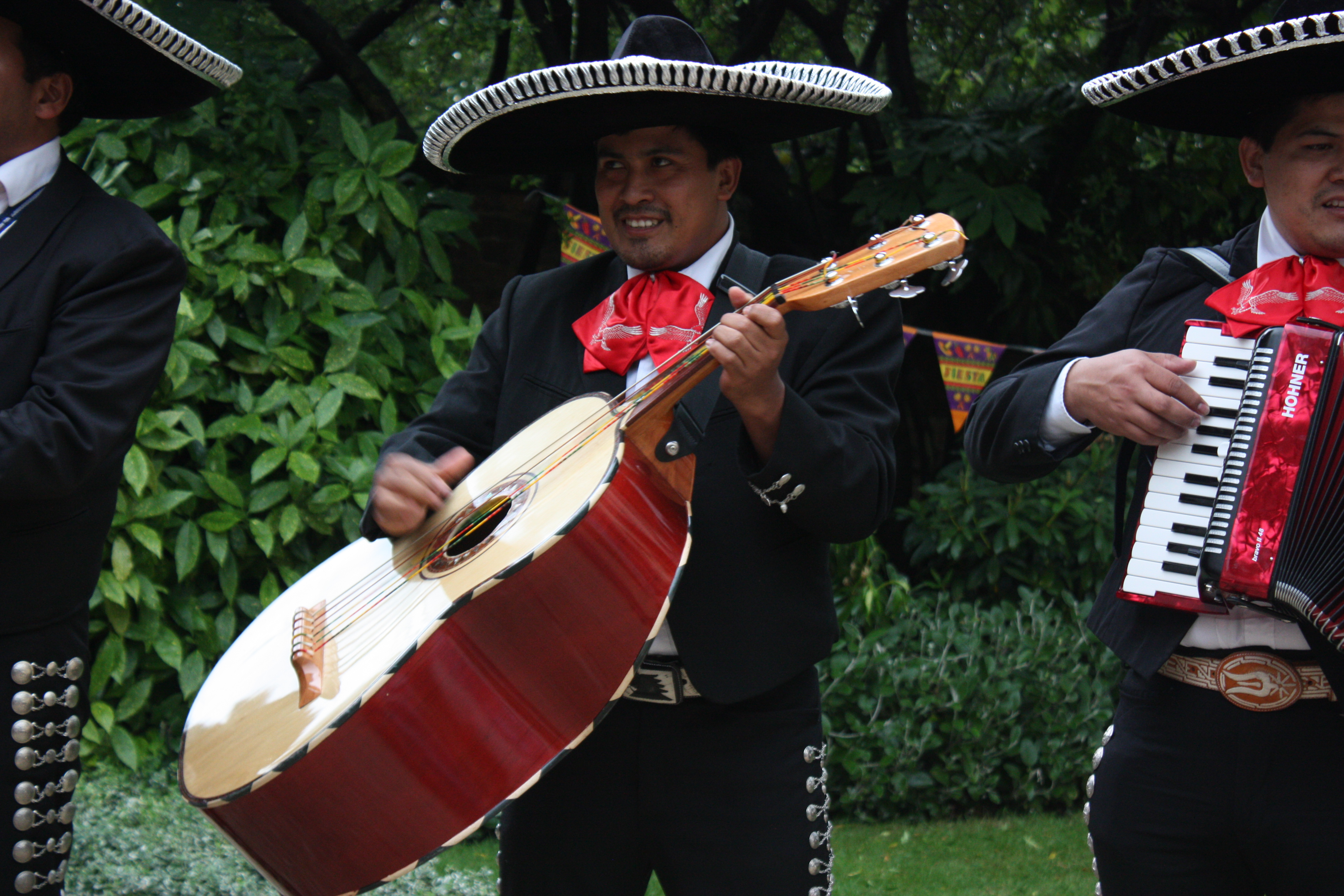
Mariachi with guitarrón

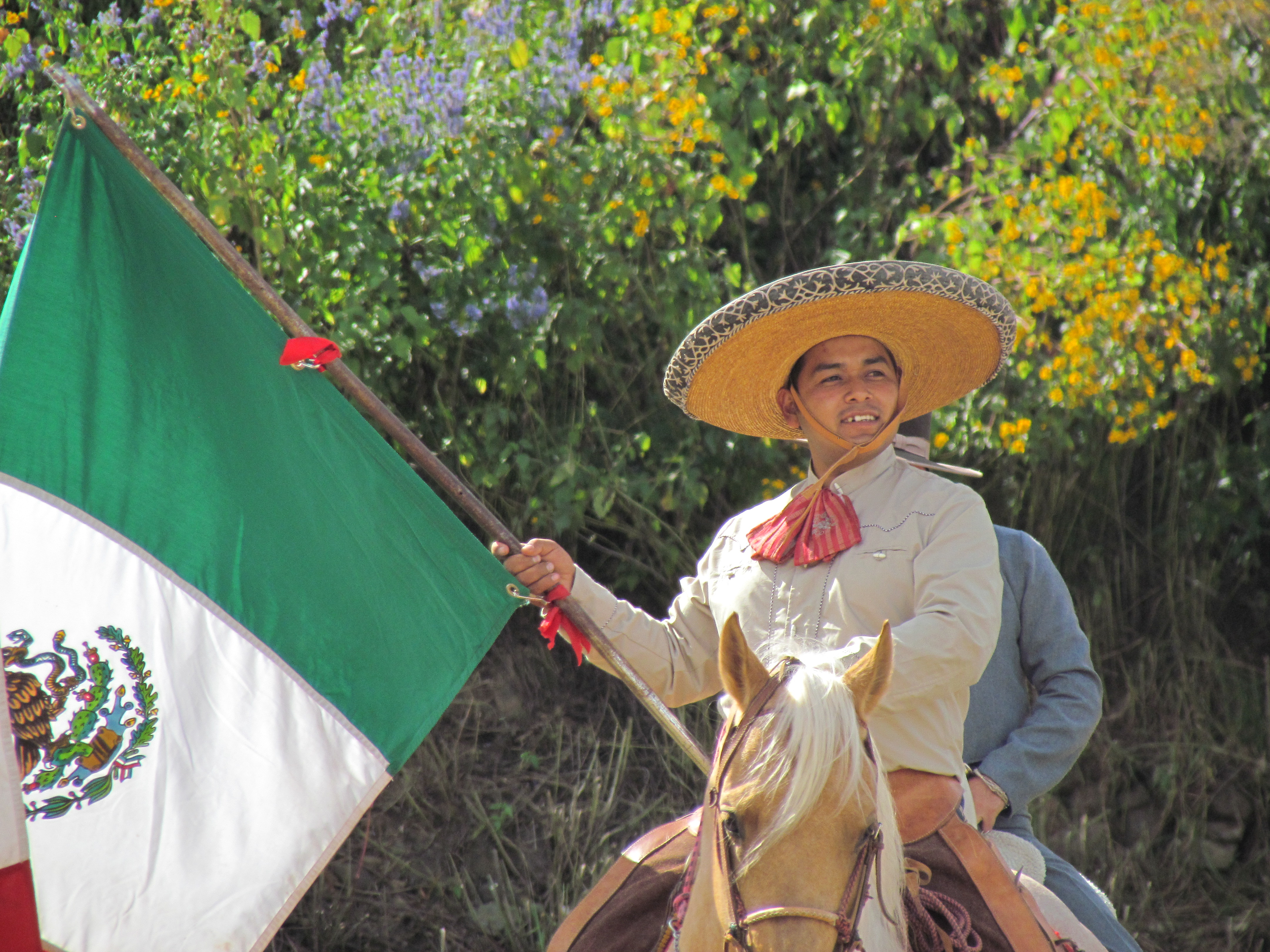
Charreria, Charro with the Mexican flag

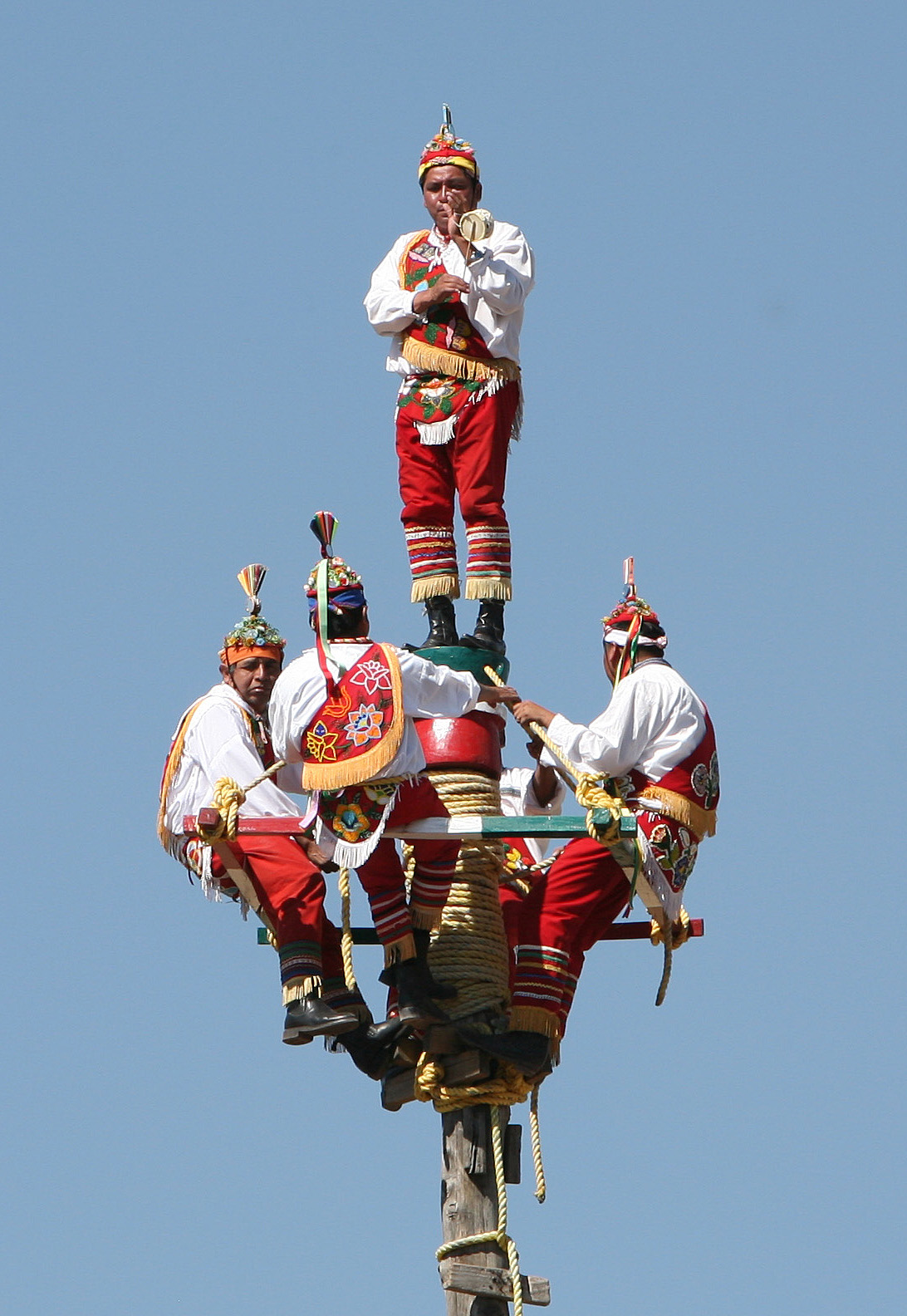
Danza de los Voladores (Flying Men) starting their dance, Teotihuacan

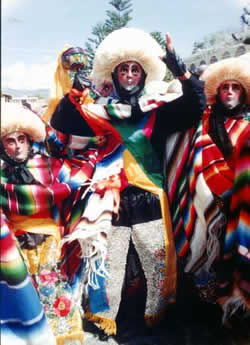
Parachico dancers, Chiapas

=== Gallery of crafts in Mexico ===
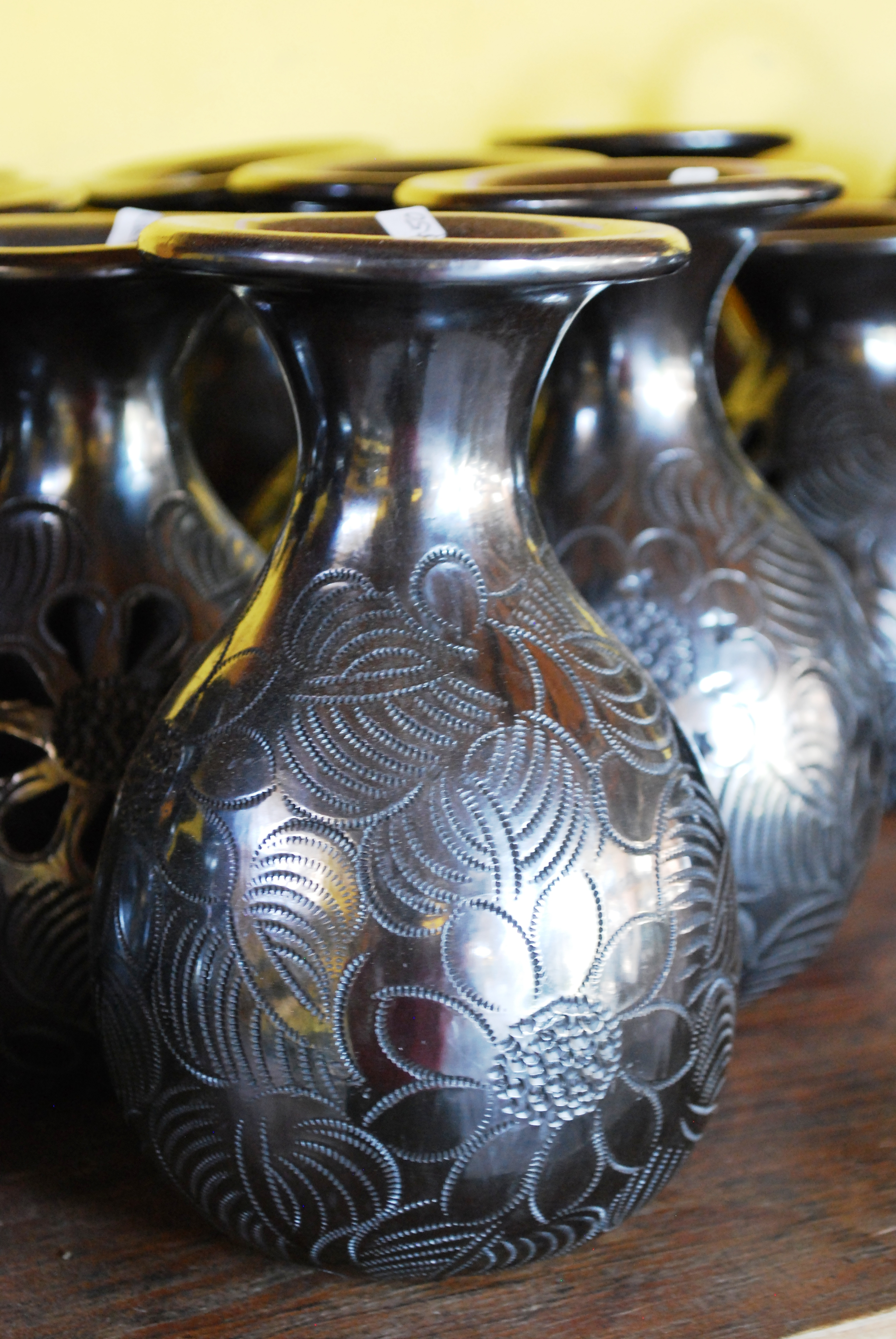
Barro negro pottery, San Bartolo Coyotepec

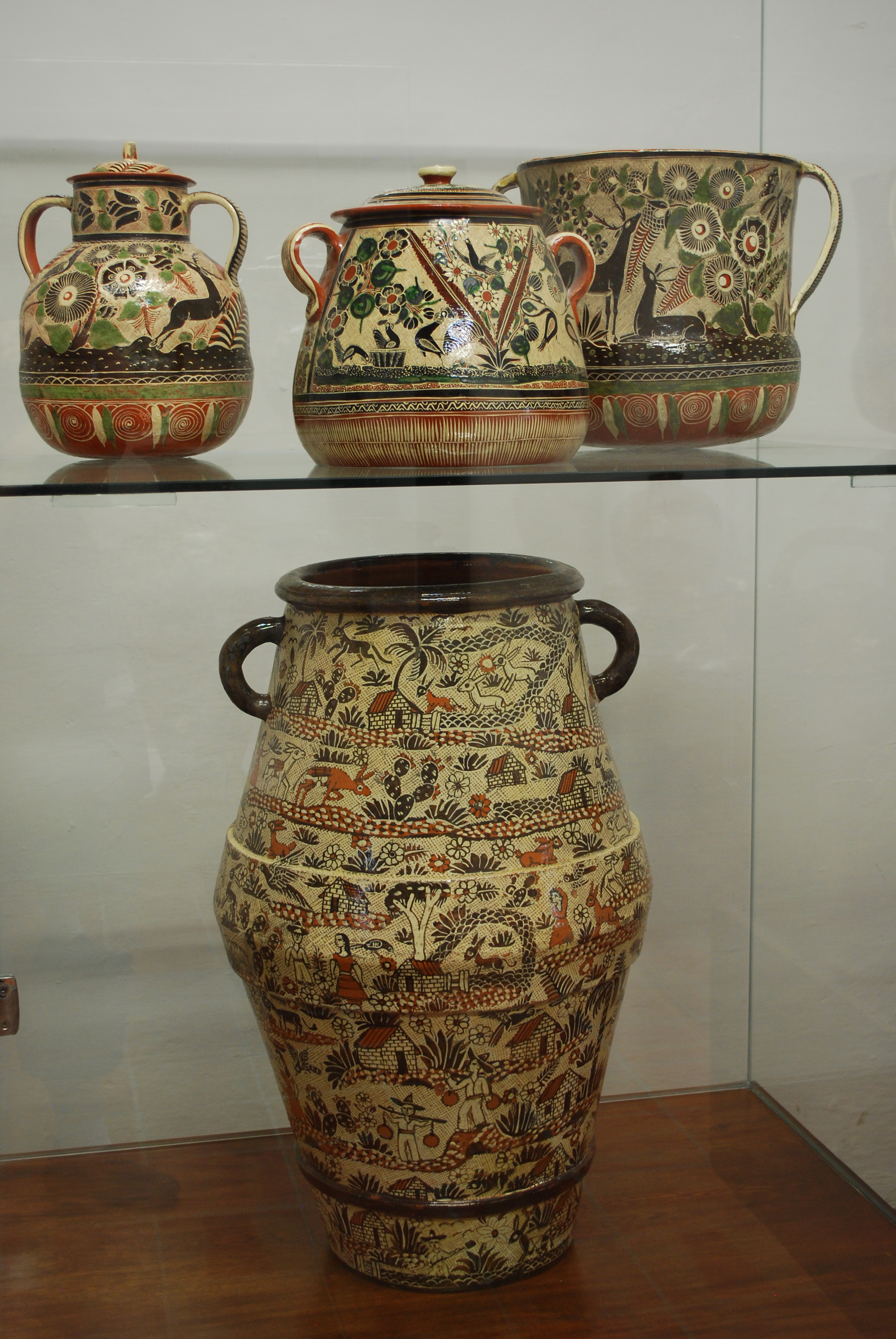
Ceramics of Jalisco, Tlaquepaque

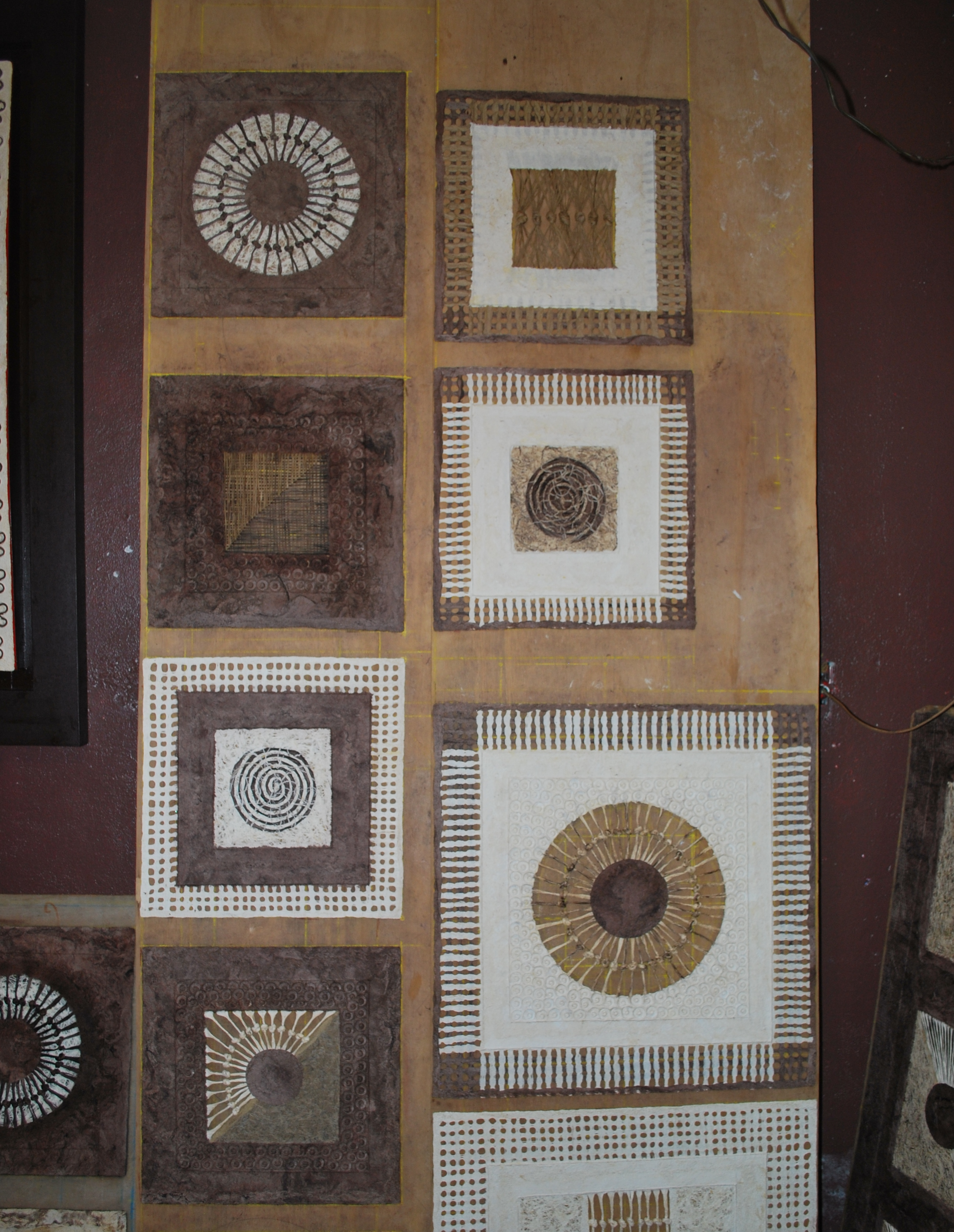
Amate paper, San Pablito, Puebla

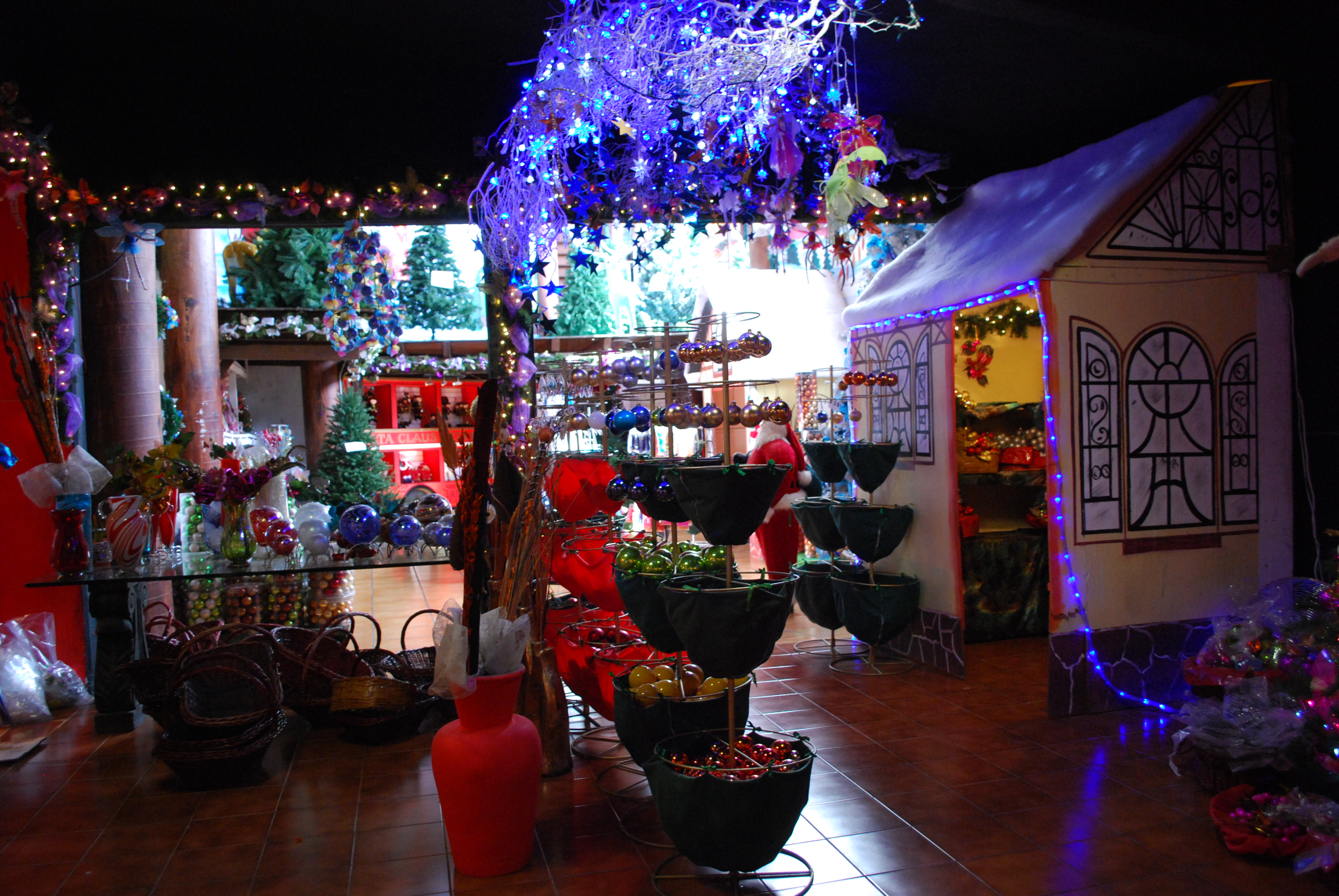
Tlalpujahua, Christmas ornaments

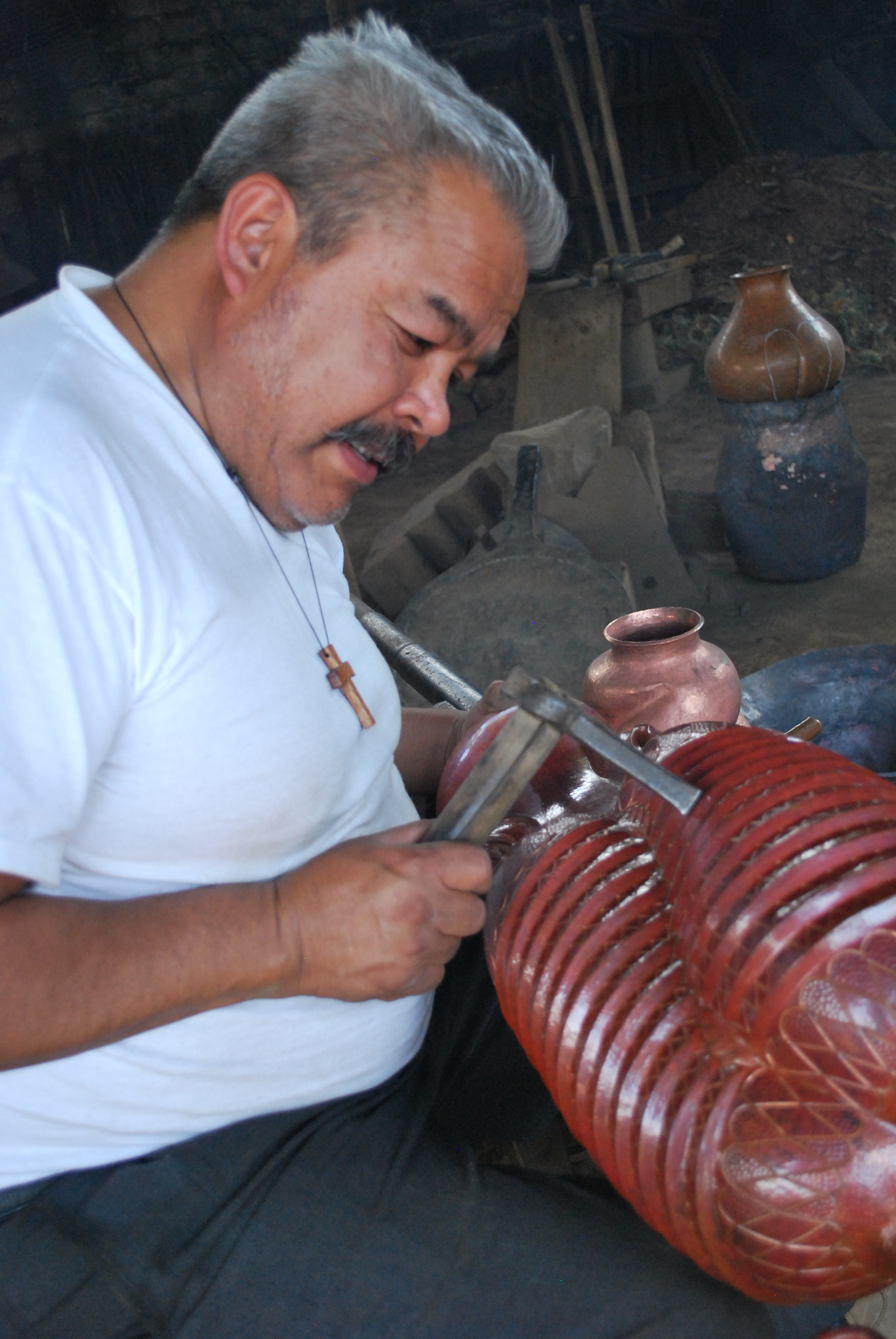
Coppersmith in Santa Clara del Cobre

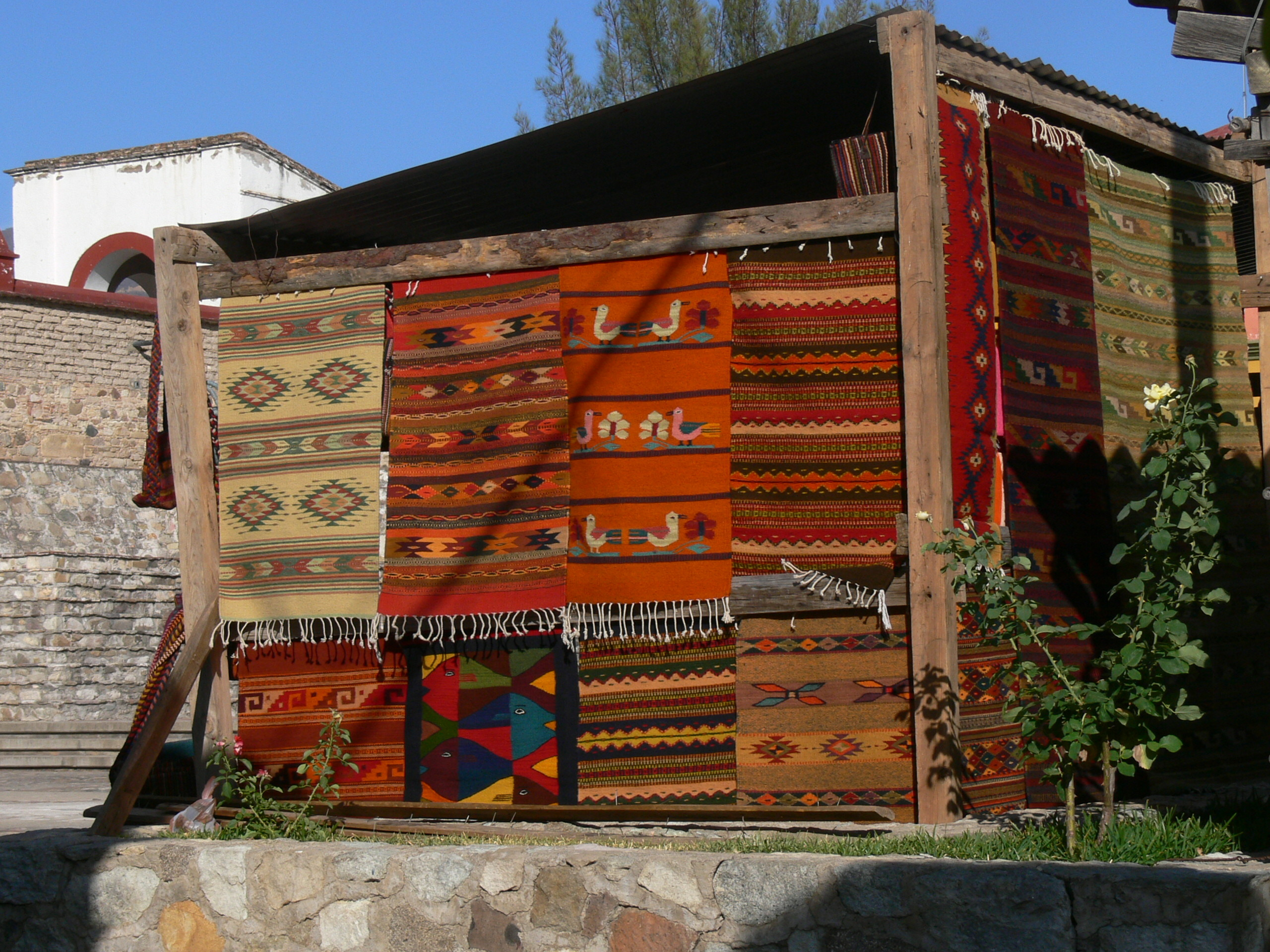
Teotitlan del Valle rugs

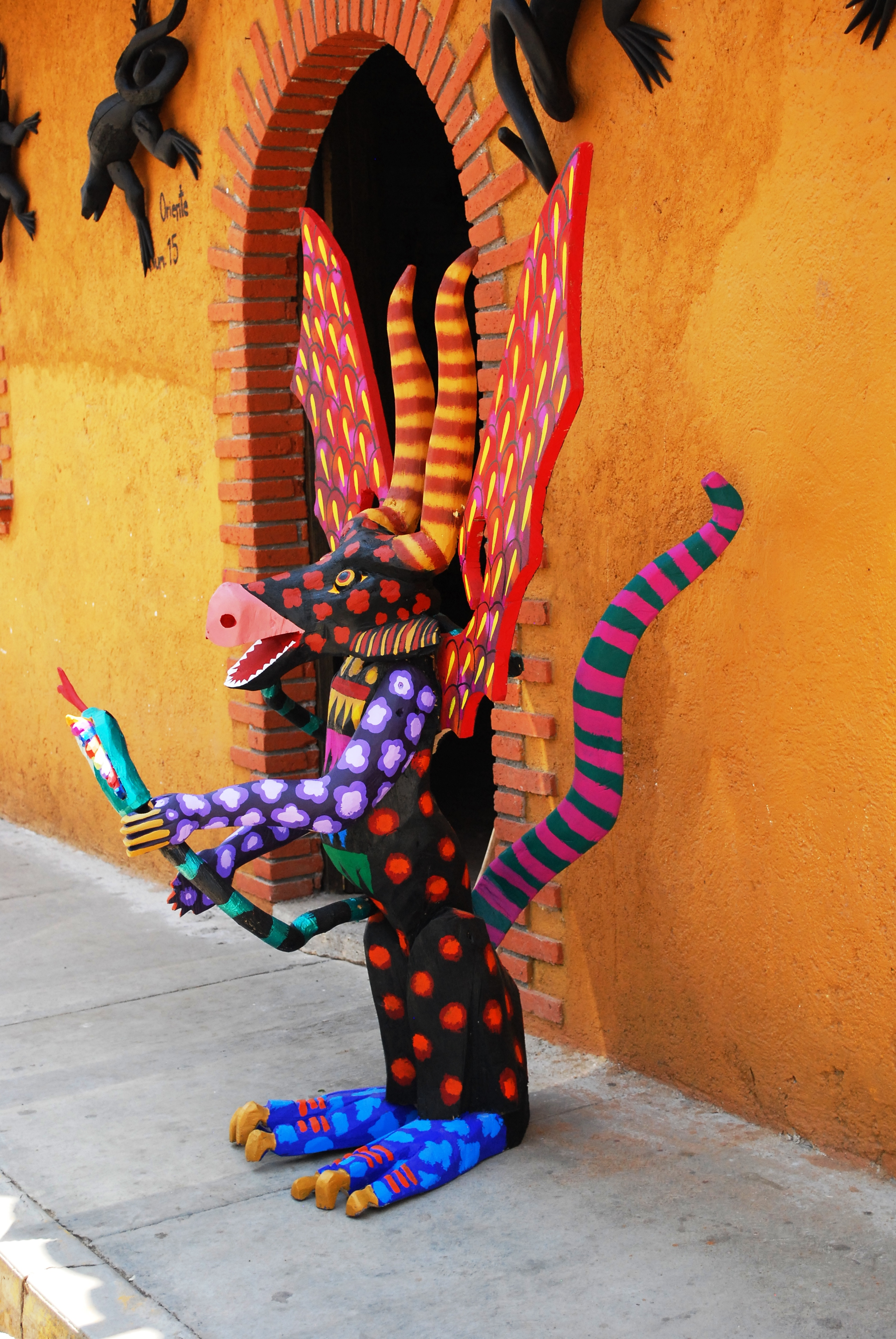
Large alebrije in San Martín Tilcajete

== Ecotourism ==
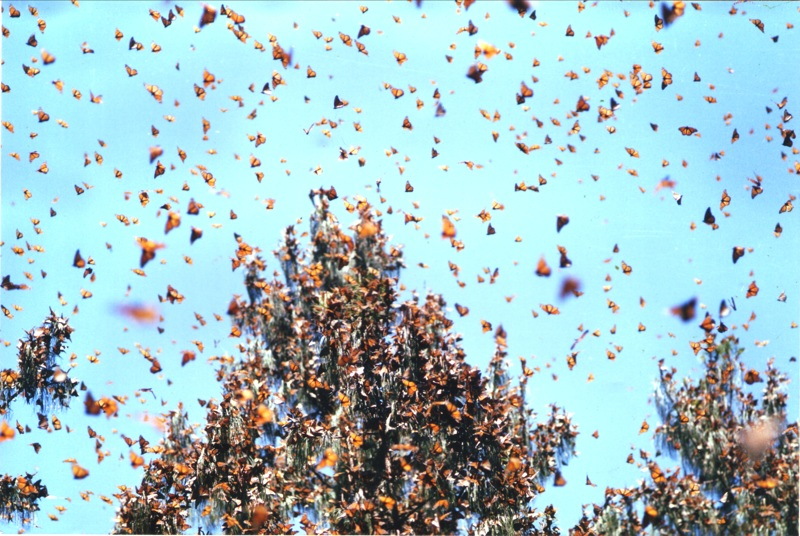
Monarch Butterfly Biosphere Reserve, a UNESCO World Heritage Site

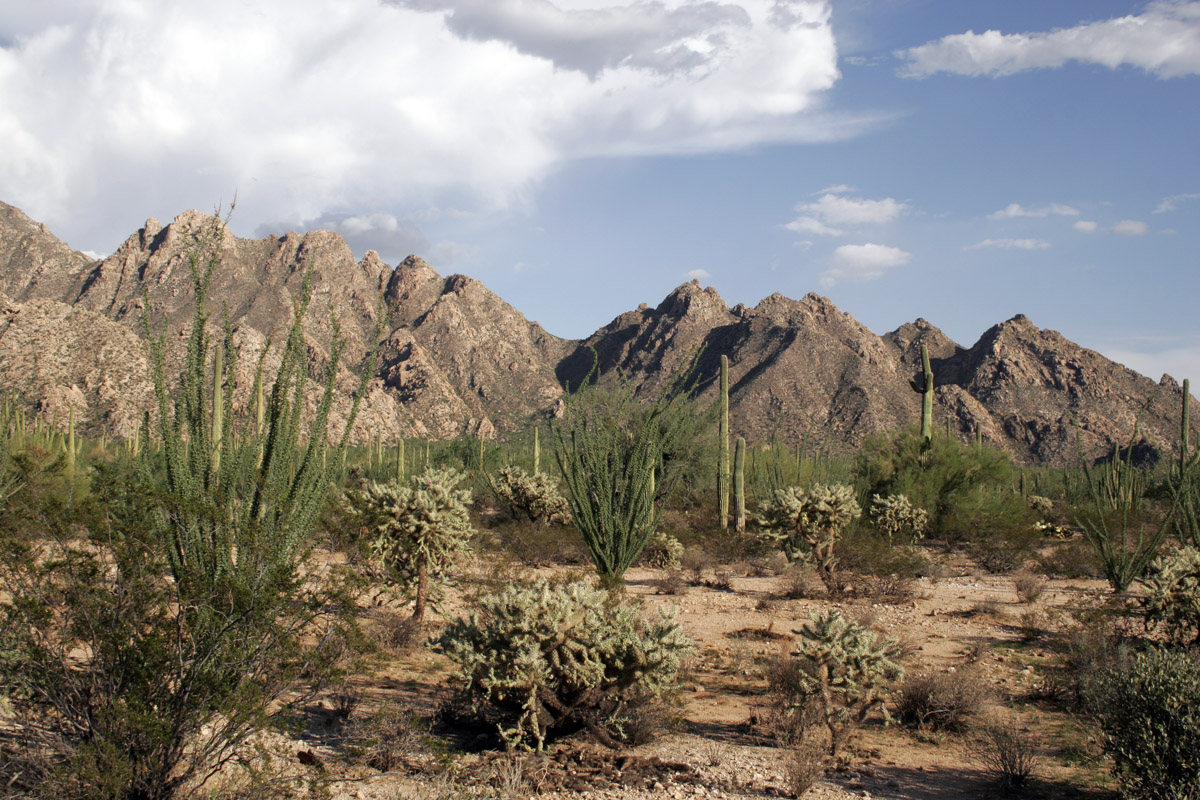
Sonora Desert

In Latin America, Costa Rica is considered a model for ecotourism, and Mexico is seeking to develop this sector. Aims for what is considered success in the sector is the proportion of tourist dollars that remain in the locality rather than those outside and prevention of large numbers of ecotourists that could undermine tourists' experience of the natural wonders. Mexico has a significant number of sites designated as UNESCO Biosphere Reserves, some of which are tourist destinations.

- El Cielo Biosphere
- Barranca del Cobre
- Cascada de Texolo
- Durango
- El Nevado
- El Rosario – in the last two months of the year, a mass migration of monarch butterflies reaches the El Rosario sanctuary near Zitácuaro, Michoacán.
- Isla Mujeres
- Pinacate Peaks
- La Bufadora
- Reserva de la Biosfera El Cielo
- Sian Ka'an
- Gulf of California
- Parque Nacional Sierra de Organos (Sombrerete, Zacatecas)
- Parque Nacional Sierra San Pedro Mártir
- Real de Catorce
- Ría Lagartos Biosphere Reserve, Yucatan
- Tzararecuita
- Monarch Butterfly Biosphere Reserve

== Medical tourism ==
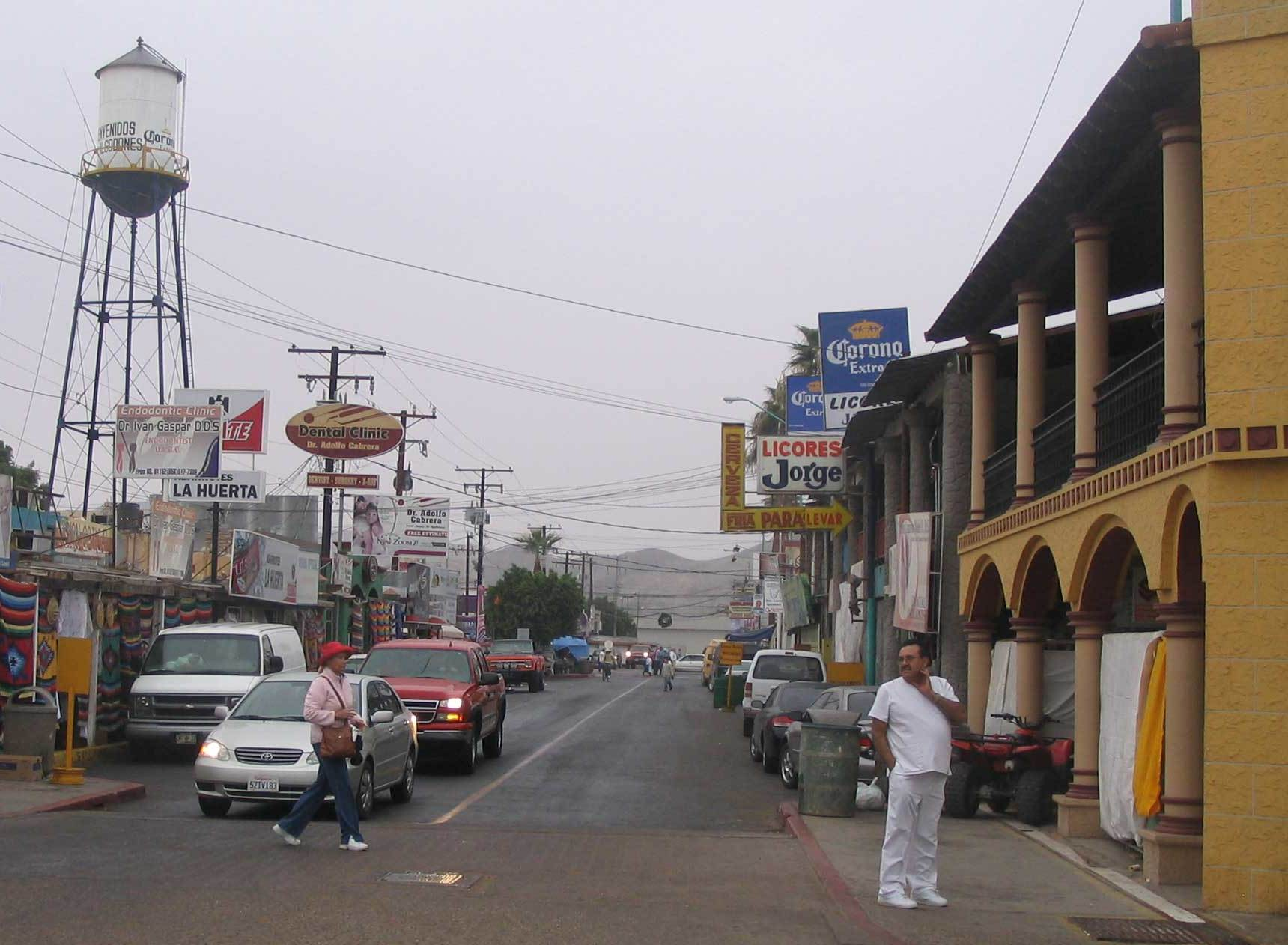
Los Algodones, Baja California

According to a 2018 survey by the Medical Tourism Association, Mexico is among the top medical destinations for Americans. The Medical Tourism Index ranks Mexico as the 29th most popular destination for medical tourism. Mexico been a destination for medical tourism due to its proximity to the United States. Border towns like Tijuana and Ciudad Juárez attracted Americans seeking affordable healthcare, especially for procedures such as dental work, cosmetic surgery, and prescription medications. In recent years, Los Algodones, Baja California, a settlement of fewer than 6,000 people located on the US border near Yuma, Arizona, has become a major destination for Americans and Canadians seeking dental services. Roughly 600 dentists practice in the community, catering mainly to tourists, leading the community to be nicknamed "Molar City".

== Transportaion ==
Mexico is served by a number of domestic and international airlines, with several local carriers recognized for quality and extensive coverage.

== See also ==
- Architecture of Mexico
- Cenote
- List of World Heritage Sites in Mexico
- Mesoamerican Barrier Reef System
- Pueblos Mágicos
- Secretariat of Tourism
- Visa policy of Mexico

== Sources ==
- UNWTO Annual Report. World Tourism Organization. Accessed 20 November 2013.
- Cultura Turistica. Secretaria de Turismo. Accessed 20 November 2013.
- Tourist Destinations in Mexico.
- Gallagher, Margaret (2008). "Feminist issues and the global media system". In Sarikakis, Katharine; Leslie Regan, Shade (eds.). Feminist interventions in international communication: minding the gap. Lanham, Maryland: Rowman & Littlefield. pp. 17–32. ISBN 9780742553057.
- Harper, H. H. (1910). A Journey in Southeastern Mexico.
- Hernandez, Alejandra (August 2010). "Mexicana de Aviacion se Clausura". El Universal. Accessed 20 November 2013.
