= 2010 Universal Forum of Cultures =

- Begins: 22 October 2010
- Ends: 5 December 2010
- Locations: Valparaíso, Chile
- Inaugurated: The 2004 Universal Forum of Cultures in Barcelona, Spain
- Most recent: The 2007 Universal Forum of Cultures in Monterrey, Mexico

The 2010 Universal Forum of Cultures was an international event that took place in Valparaíso, Chile, in 2010. It was the third edition of the Universal Forum of Cultures.

== History ==
The forum was held in Valparaíso, Chile, in 2010.
