= Fundidora Park =

Public park in Monterrey, Nuevo León

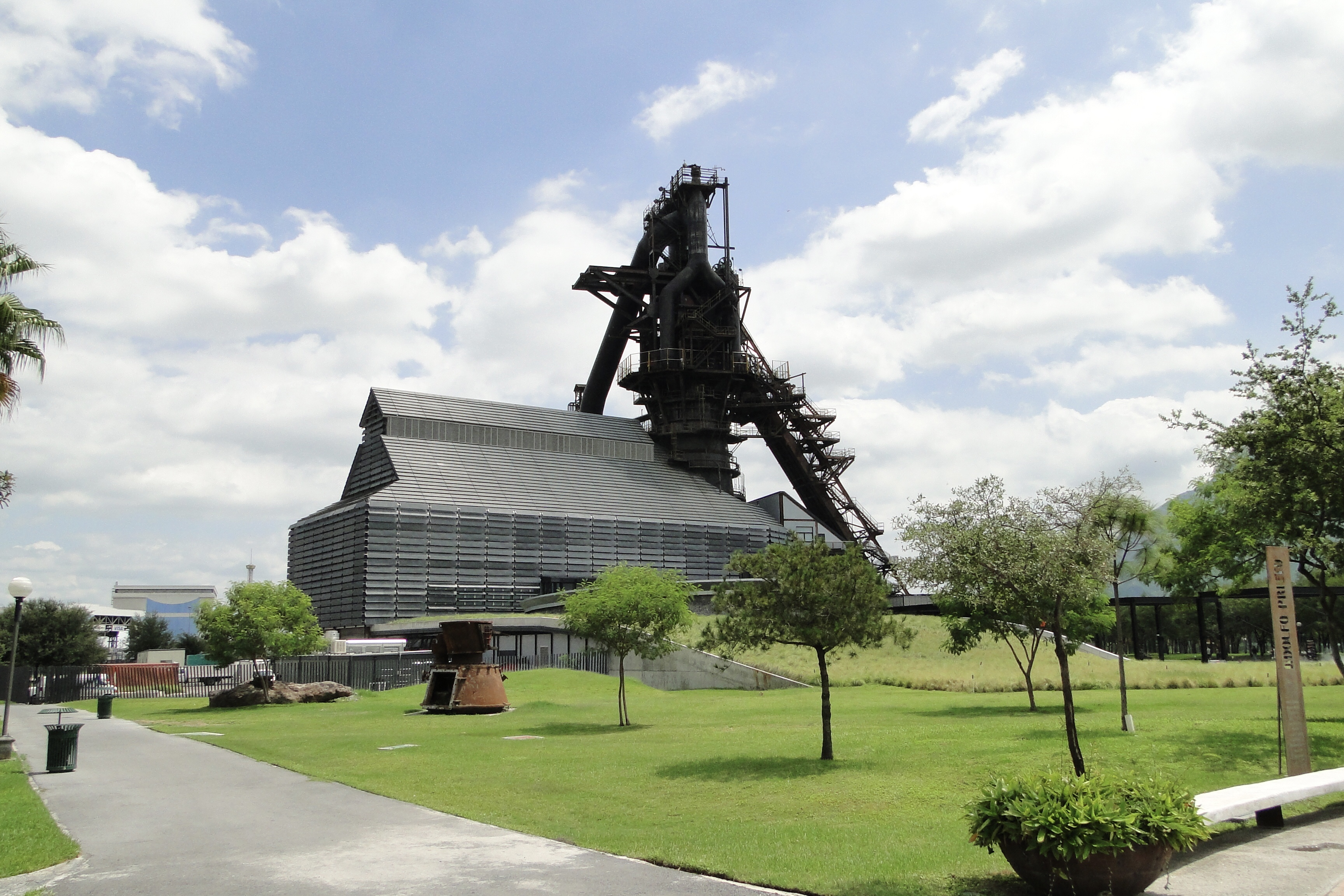
- The Old Steel Mill at Fundidora Park
- Interactive map of Fundidora Park
- Type: Urban Park
- Location: Monterrey, Mexico
- Coordinates: 25°40′41″N 100°17′00″W
- Area: 144 hectares (360 acres)
- Created: 2001
- Operator: Fideicomiso Fundidora
- Visitors: over 8.5 million annually
- Open: 6 a.m. to 10 p.m.

Fundidora Park (Parque Fundidora in Spanish) is an urban park located in the Mexican city of Monterrey, built in what once were the grounds of the Monterrey Foundry, the first steel and iron foundry in Latin America, and, for many years, the most important one in the region.

== History and location ==
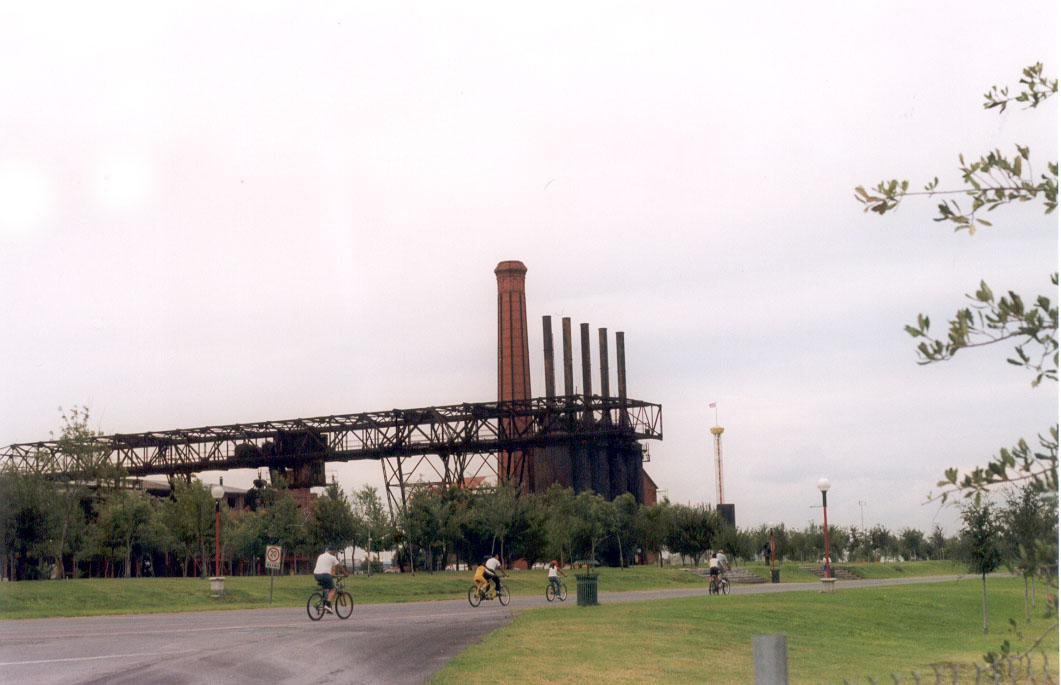
Parque Fundidora with steel mill ruins

The Parque Fundidora is located inside the grounds formerly occupied by Fundidora Monterrey, a steel foundry company of great importance to the economic development of the city during the 20th century. After its bankruptcy in 1986, Federal and State government showed interest in using the land to create a public park with the aim to preserve its history as well as being a center of culture, business, entertainment and ecological awareness for the people of the city. In 1988 the land was expropriated and the Fideicomiso Fundidora (Fundidora Trust) was created to manage it in an arrangement between the State government and private investment. Construction began in 1989, starting with the preservation of historically important buildings and structures within the foundry and the dismantling of the others, followed by the construction of the CINTERMEX convention center, Plaza Sesamo amusement park, a hotel and a cinematheque. Construction and rehabilitation continued during the rest of the 1990s.

The park opened on February 24, 2001, with an area of 114 hectares (280 acres), receiving the additional name of Museum of Industrial Archaeology Site. In 2010 the Paseo Santa Lucía development, consisting of a 2.35 kilometres (1.46 mi) artificial river and accompanying river-walk, is incorporated to the park bringing it into its current state, with a total area of 144 hectares (360 acres), 80 hectares (200 acres) of which are green space, 2 lakes, 23 fountains, 16 buildings, 27 large scale industrial structures and 127 pieces of steel-making machinery and tools of historical importance to the state of Nuevo Leon. There is a 3.4 kilometres (2.1 mi) long track surrounding the original section of the park.

== Buildings ==
=== Monterrey Arena ===
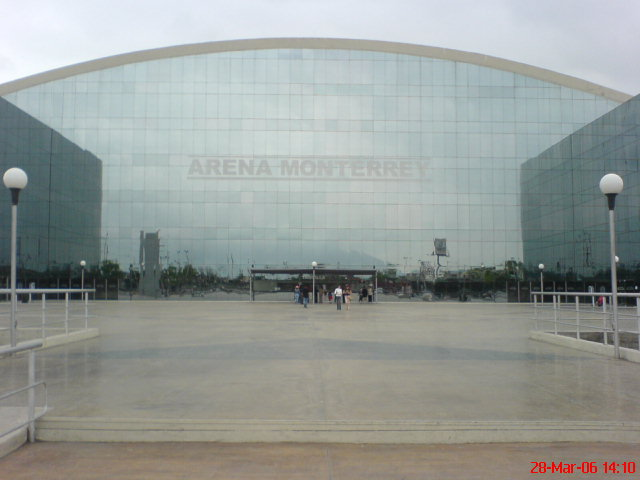
Arena Monterrey

Arena Monterrey is an indoor arena in Monterrey, Mexico. It is primarily used for concerts, shows and indoor sports like indoor soccer or basketball. It used to be the home arena of the Monterrey Fury indoor soccer team and the Fuerza Regia, a professional basketball team in the Liga Nacional de Baloncesto Profesional and the Monterrey La Raza, a team in the NISL.

The Arena Monterrey is owned by Publimax S.A. de C.V. (TV Azteca Northeast), part of the Avalanz Group, who owns 80% and by TV Azteca who owns 20%. The arena is 480,000 square feet (45,000 m^{2}) in size.

=== Cintermex ===
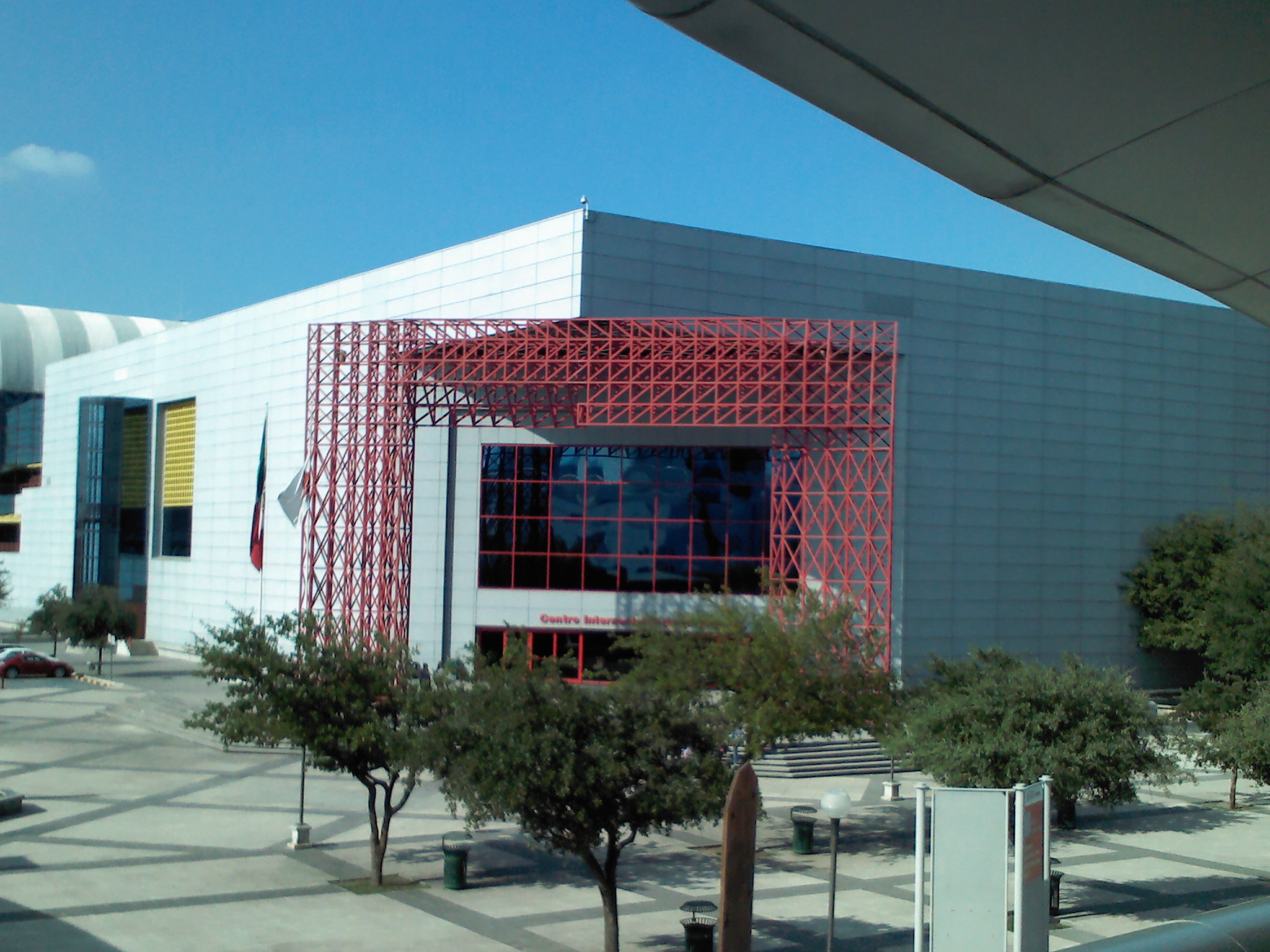
Cintermex

Cintermex is an exhibition center and convention center located in Monterrey, Nuevo León, Mexico. The venue dedicated to hosting exhibitions, congresses, business, social, and entertainment events.

=== Parque Fiesta Aventuras ===
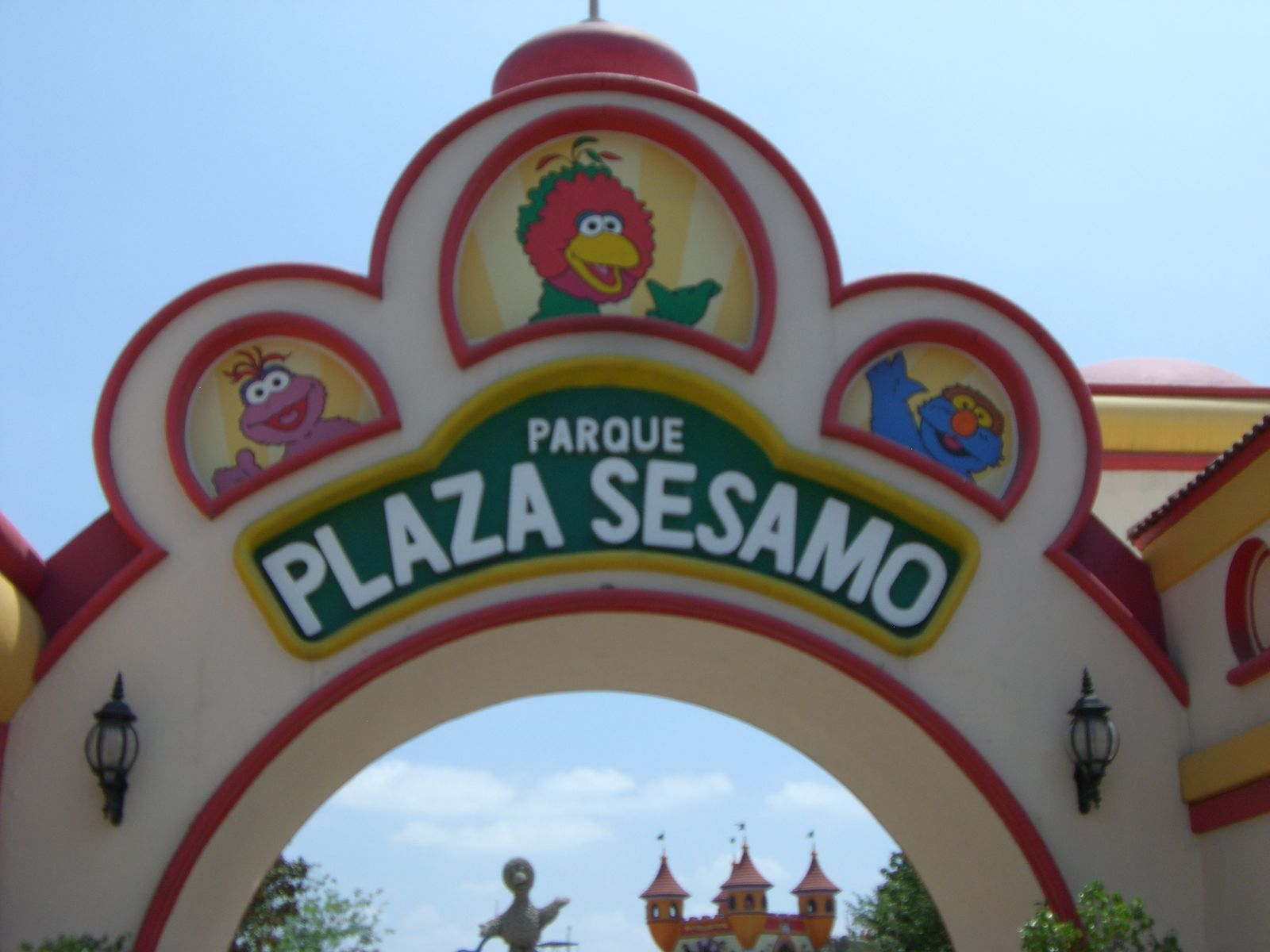
The park's entrance as Parque Plaza Sésamo.

Parque Fiesta Aventuras (formerly Parque Plaza Sésamo) is a theme park located in the complex that originally opened in 1995. The park was operated under a license from Sesame Workshop, the owners of Sesame Street and Plaza Sésamo.

On May 18, 2022, the park announced that it would rebrand as Parque Fiesta Aventuras for the 2022 season following a two-year period of closure. The reason for the rebranding was not classified by the park, but is likely that the owners had terminated the license to use the Plaza Sésamo branding and characters.

=== Auditorio Banamex ===
Auditorio Citibanamex (formerly named Auditorio Coca-Cola, Auditorio Fundidora and Auditorio Banamex) is an indoor amphitheatre with a capacity of 8,200.
The amphitheatre opened in 1994 with a sponsorship by The Coca-Cola Company, and it was the primary venue for concerts until the Arena Monterrey opened in 2003.

== Visualscapes ==
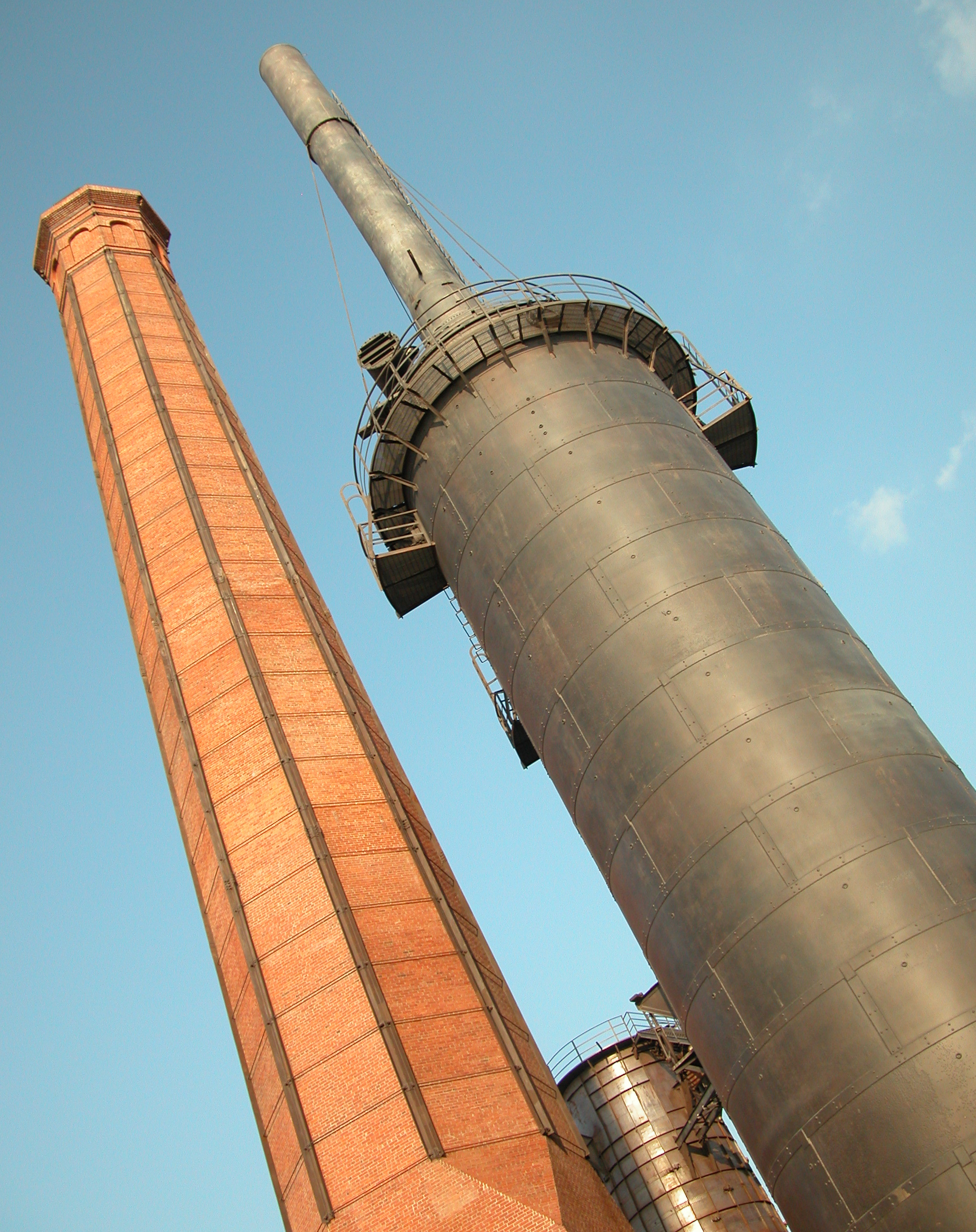
post-industrial Tower

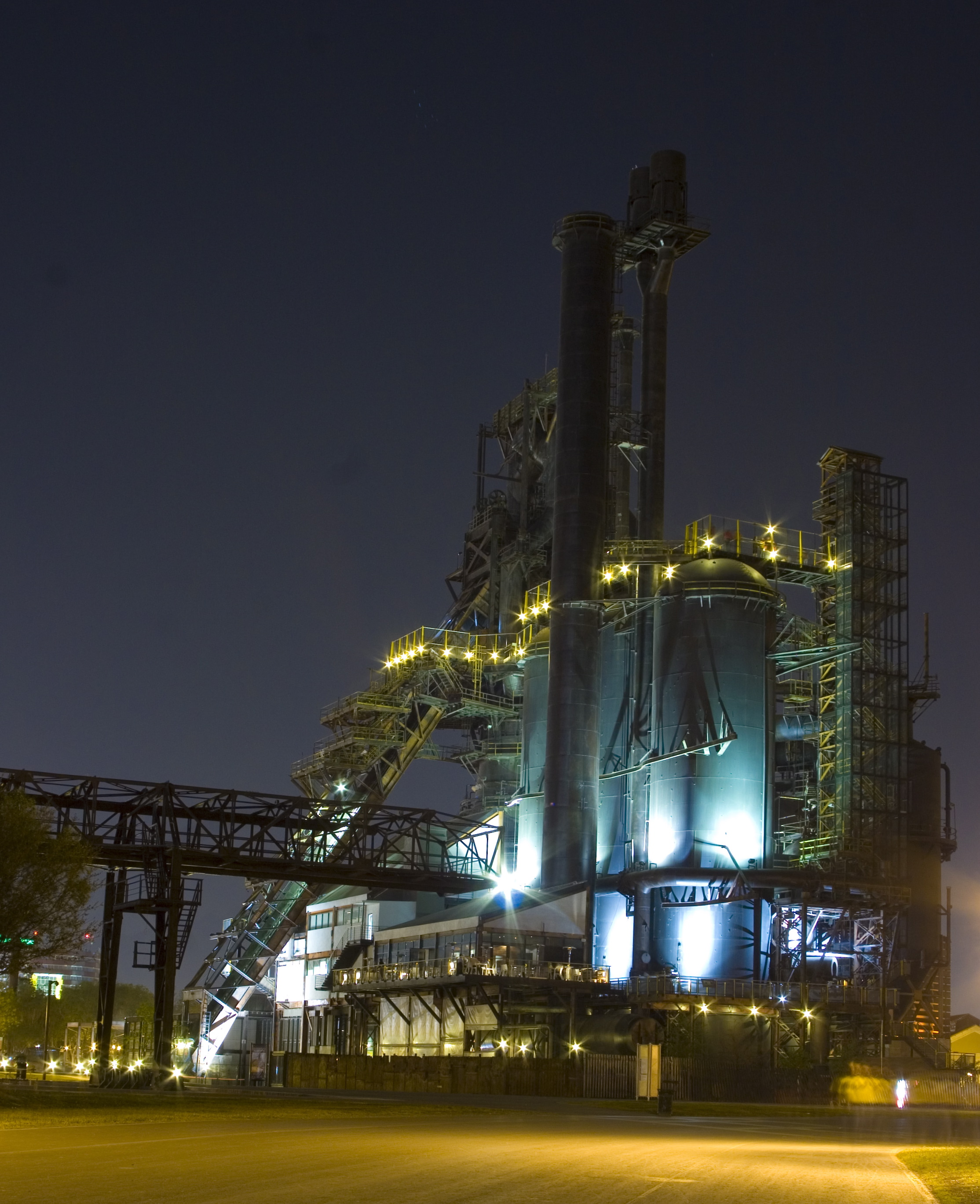
Horno 3 - 3rd Blast Furnace

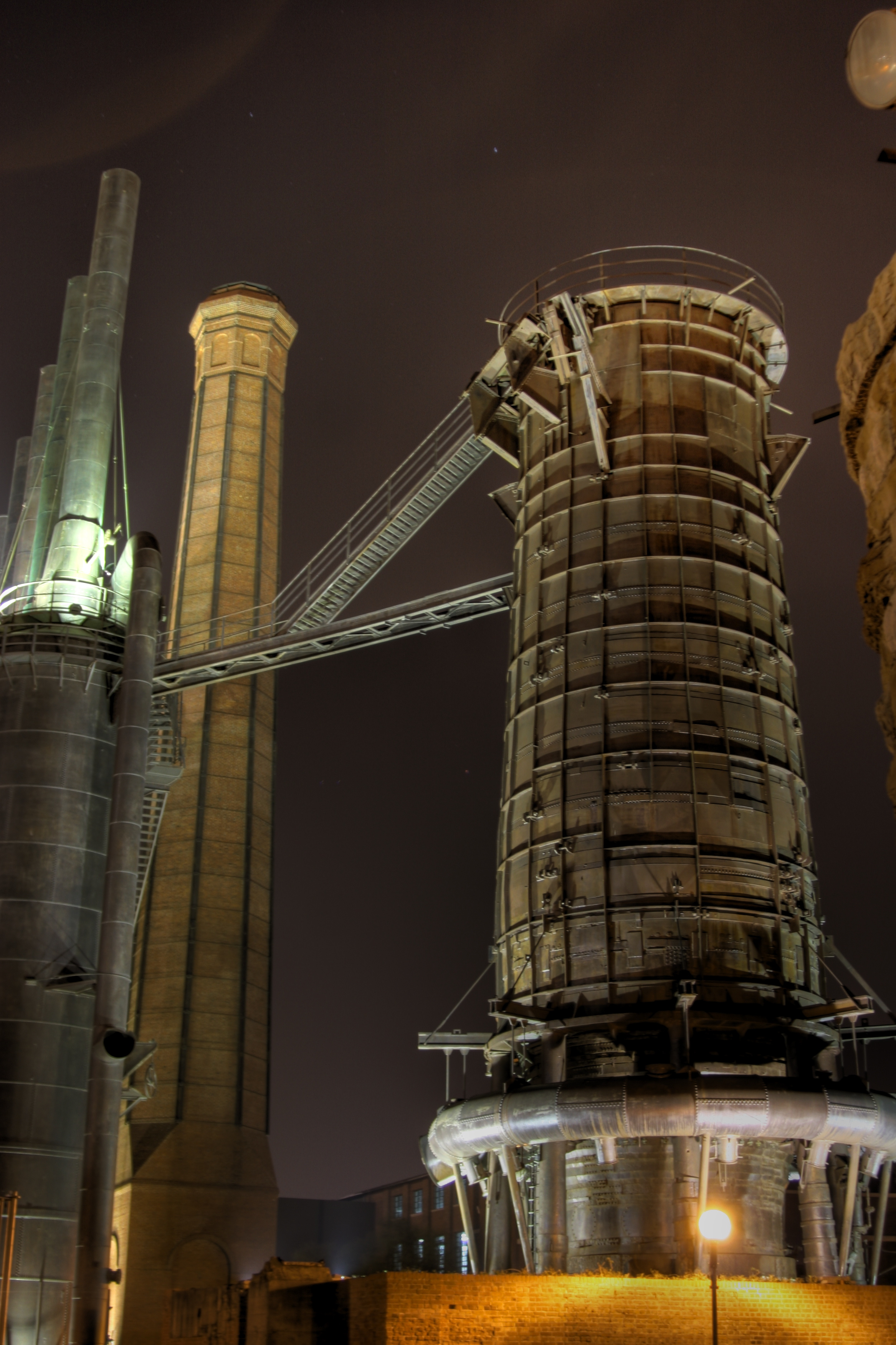

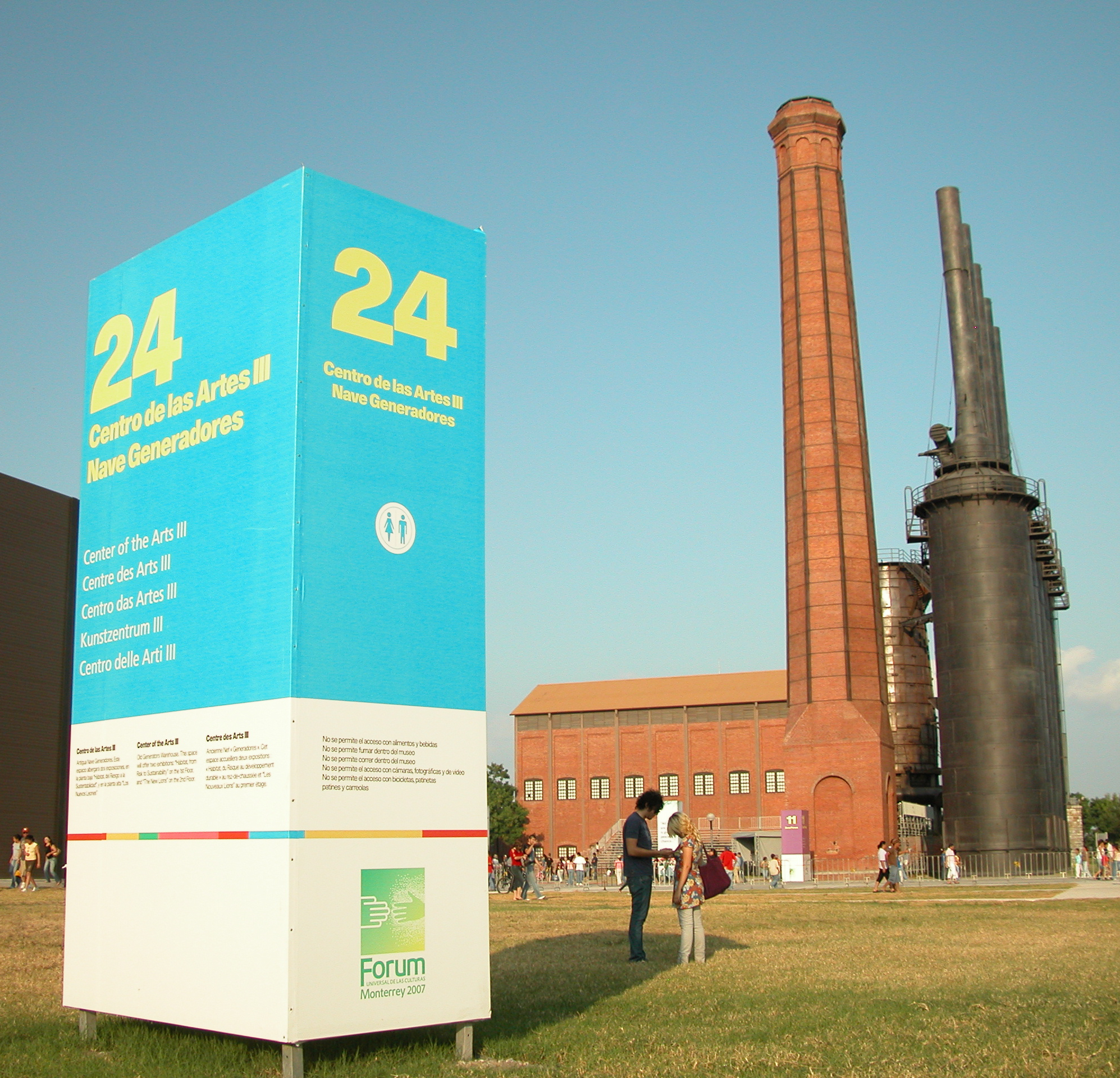
Green Field

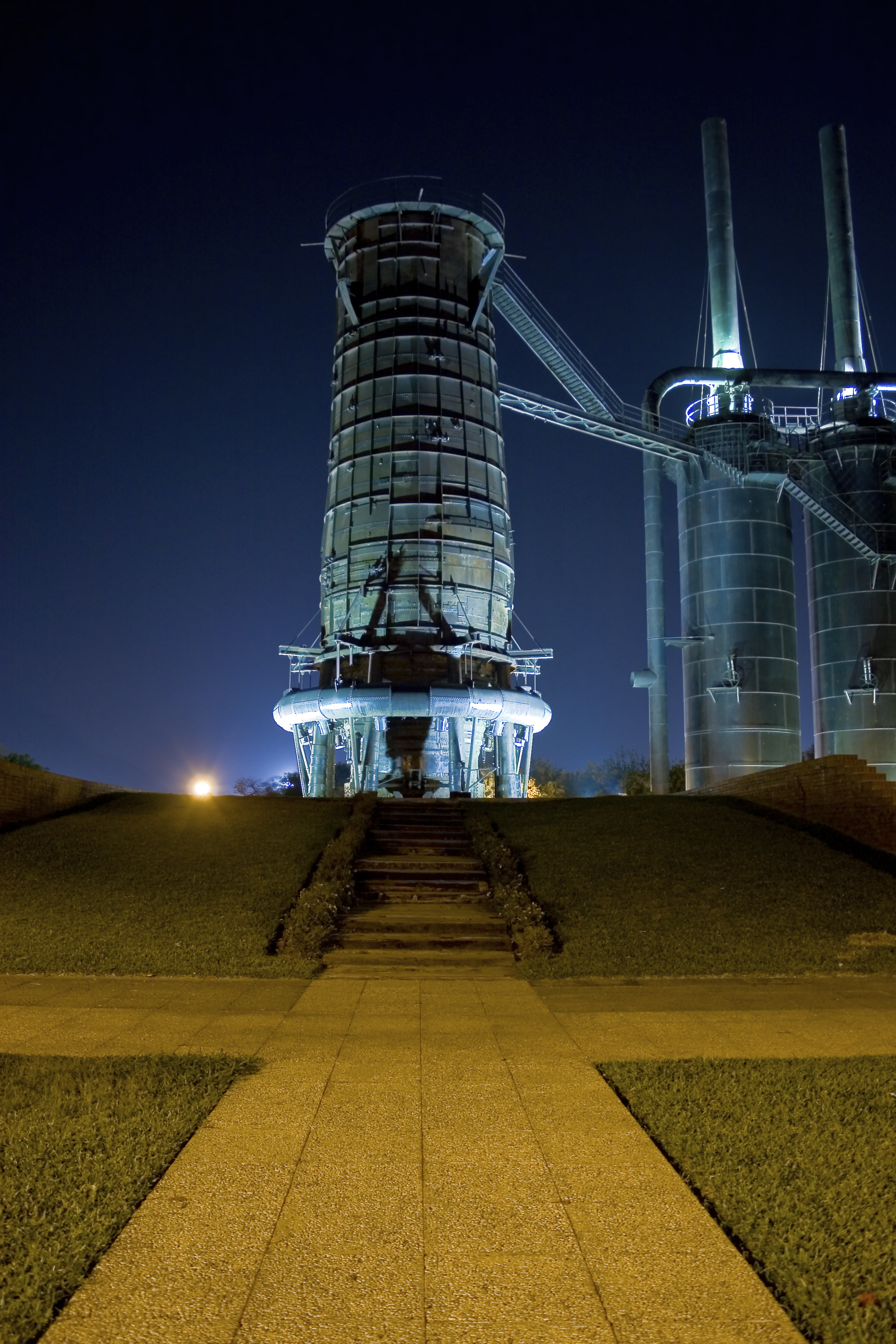

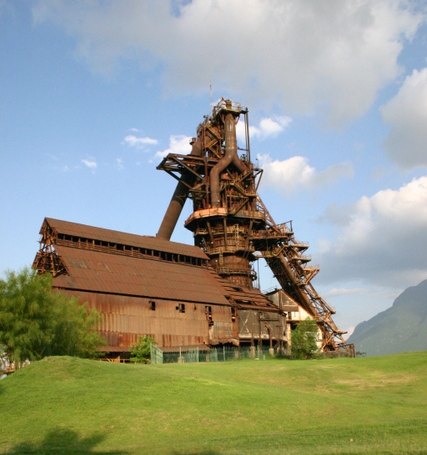
Horno 3 before restoration

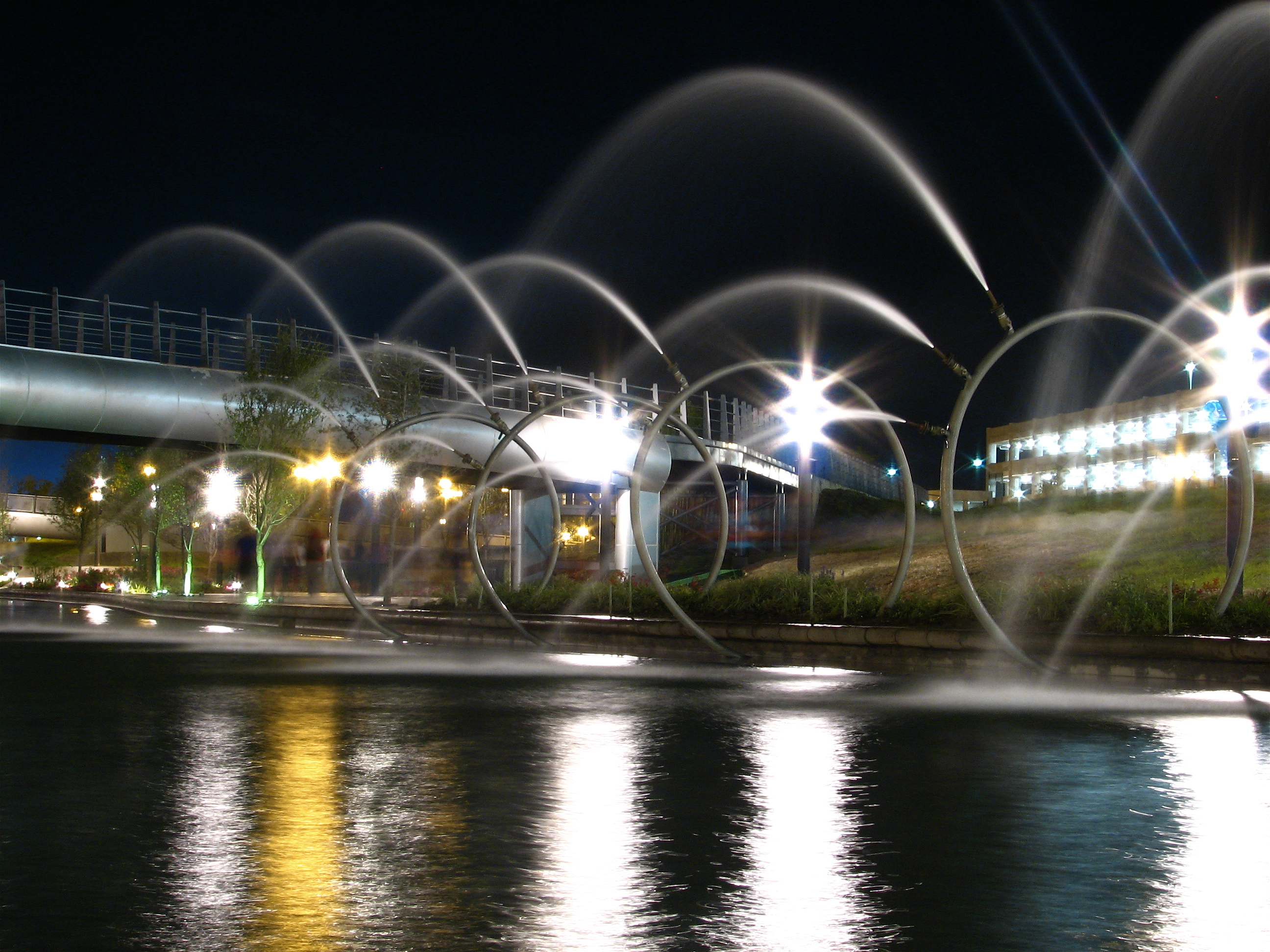
Fountain

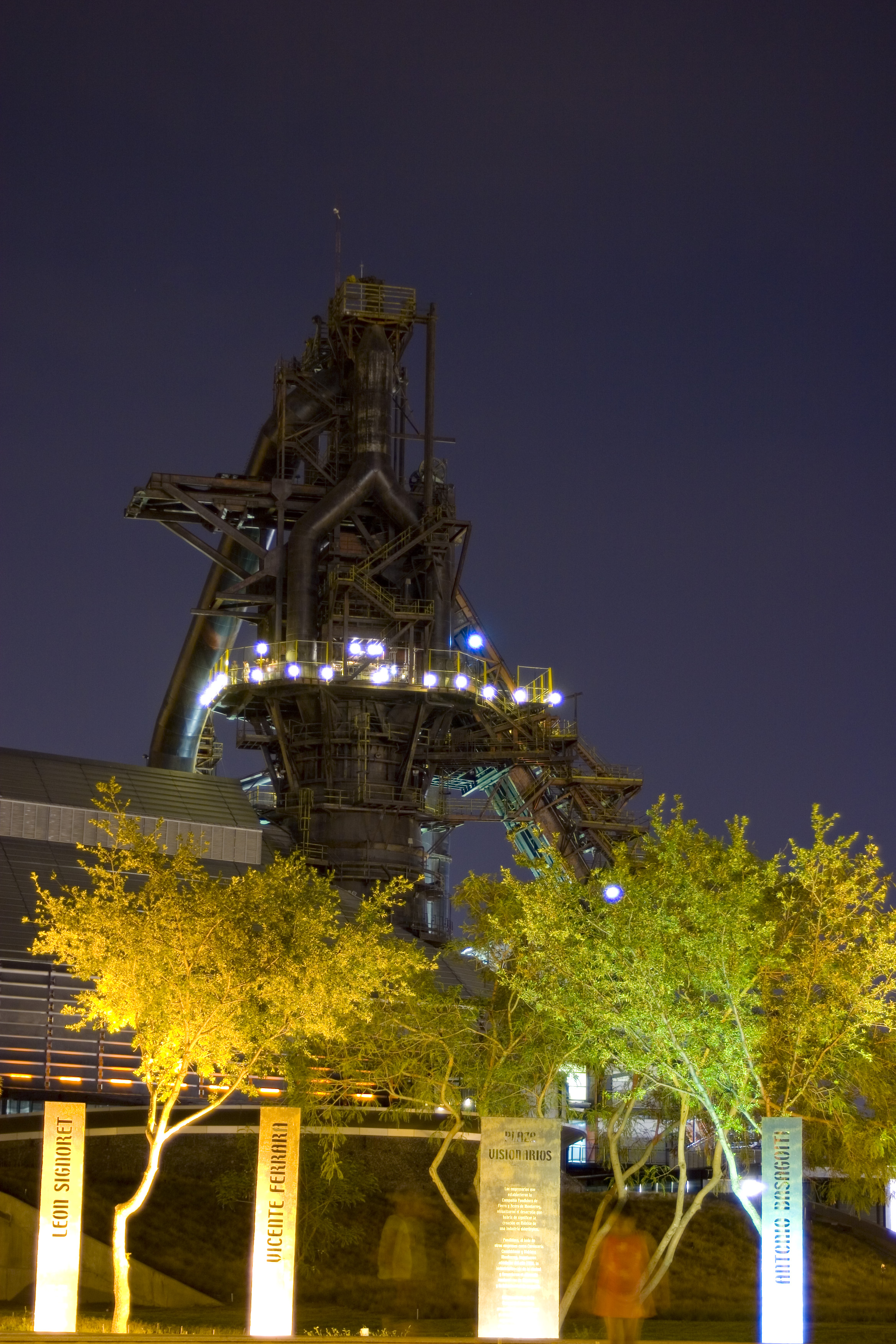
Steel Structure Fundidora Park

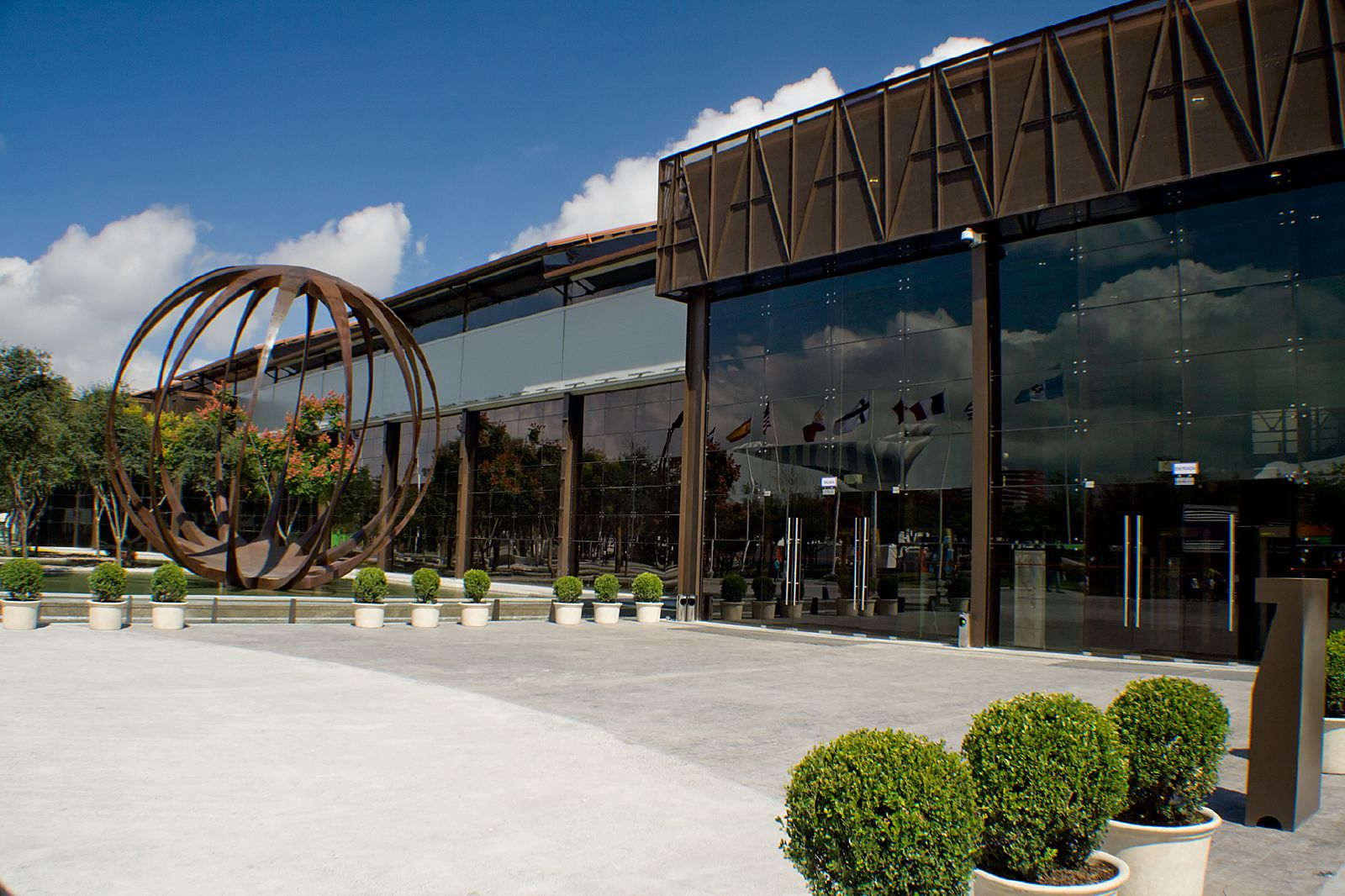
Expo Center @ the Old Lewis Building.
Host of the 2007 Universal Forum of Cultures
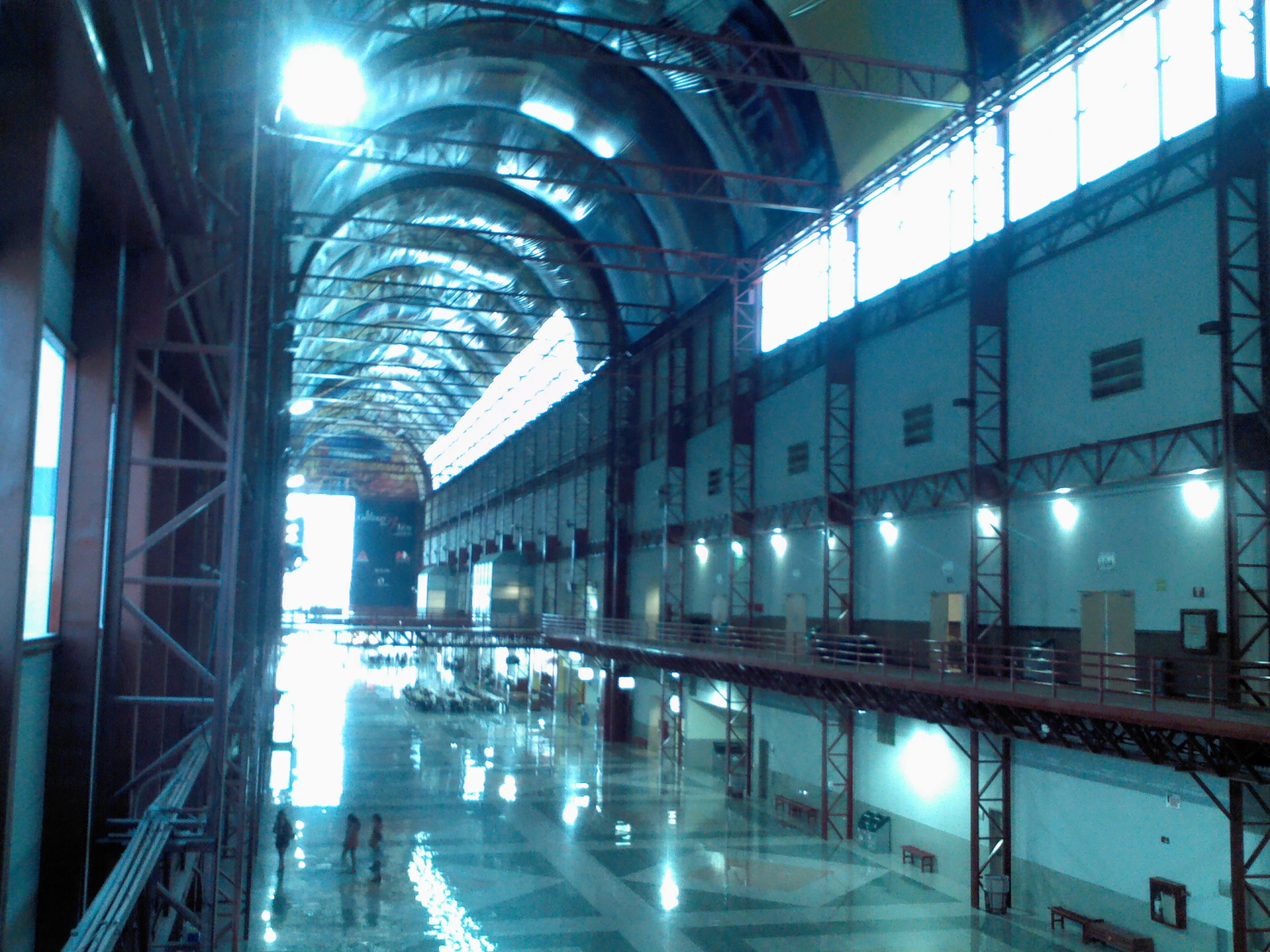
Interior de CINTERMEX.

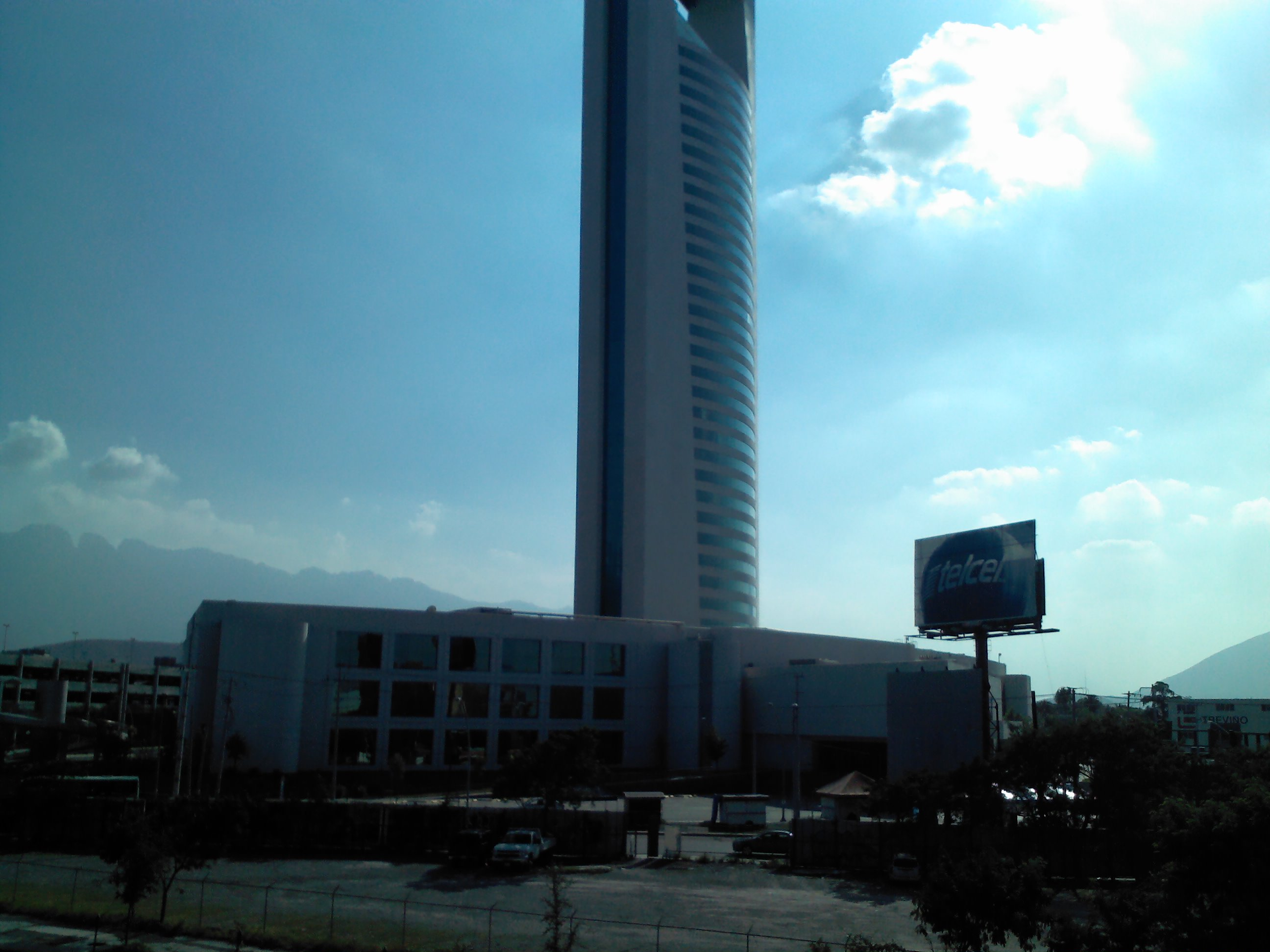
Vista a la torre.

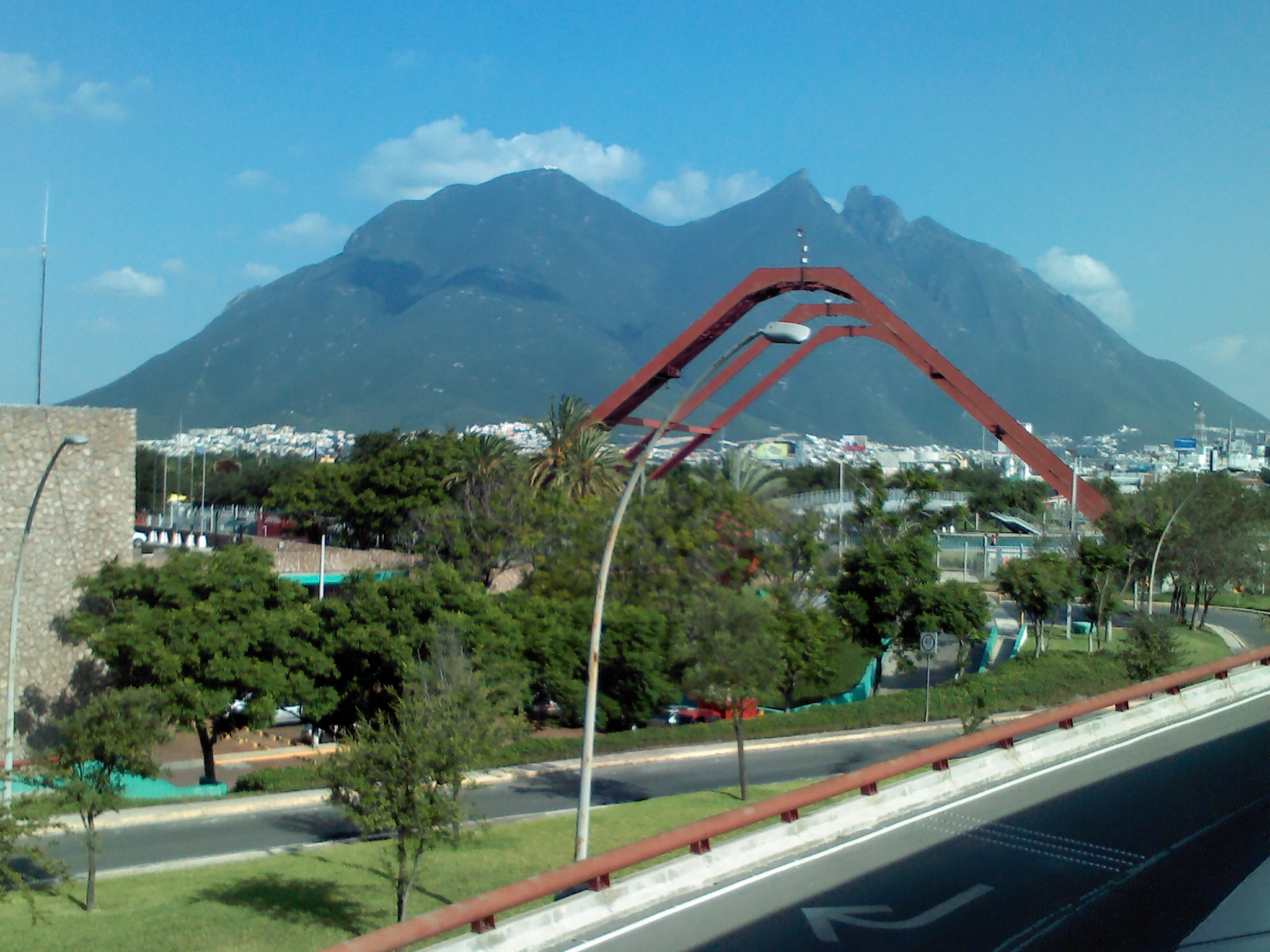
Vista a fundidora.

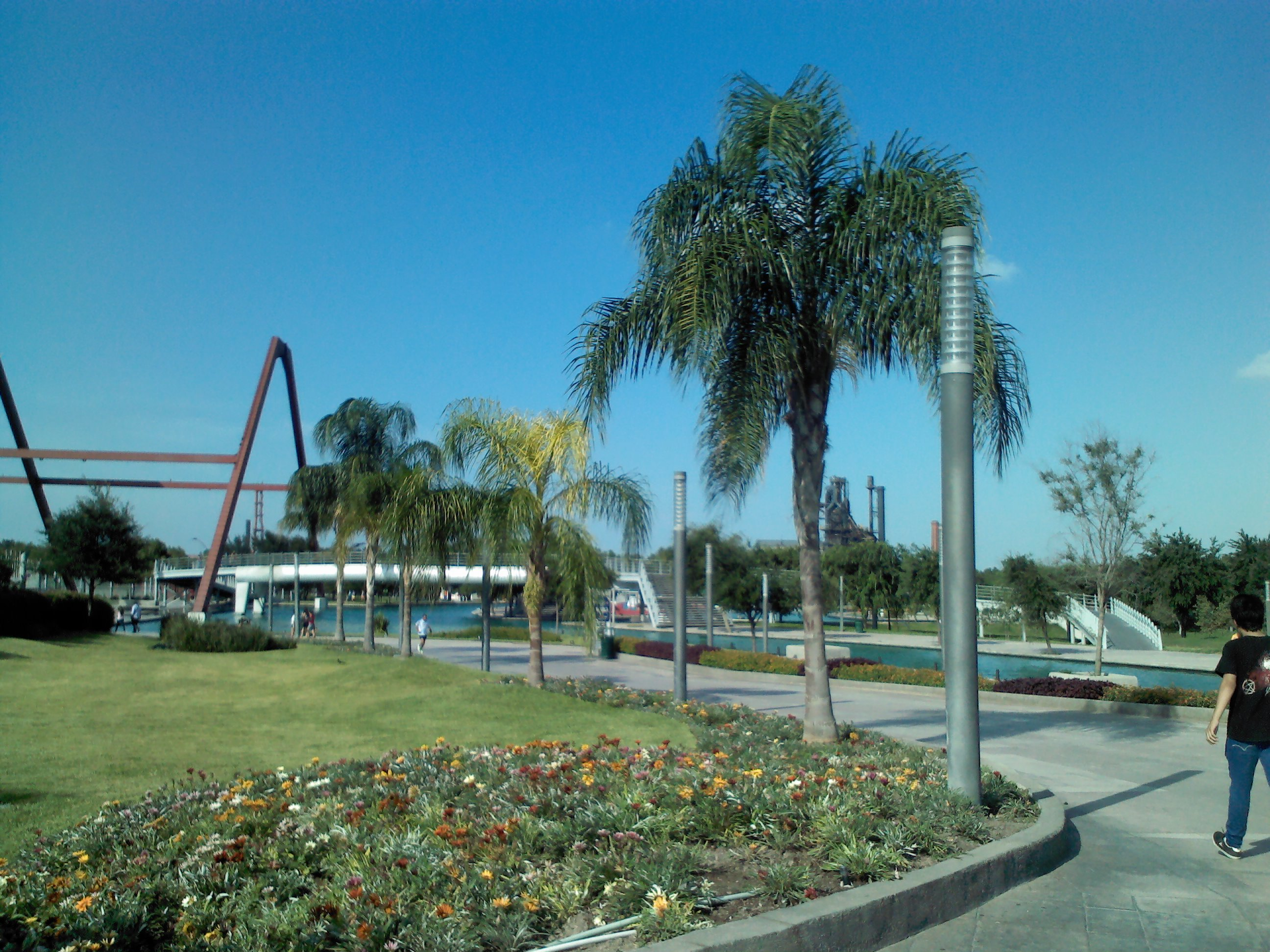
Paseo Santa Lucía.

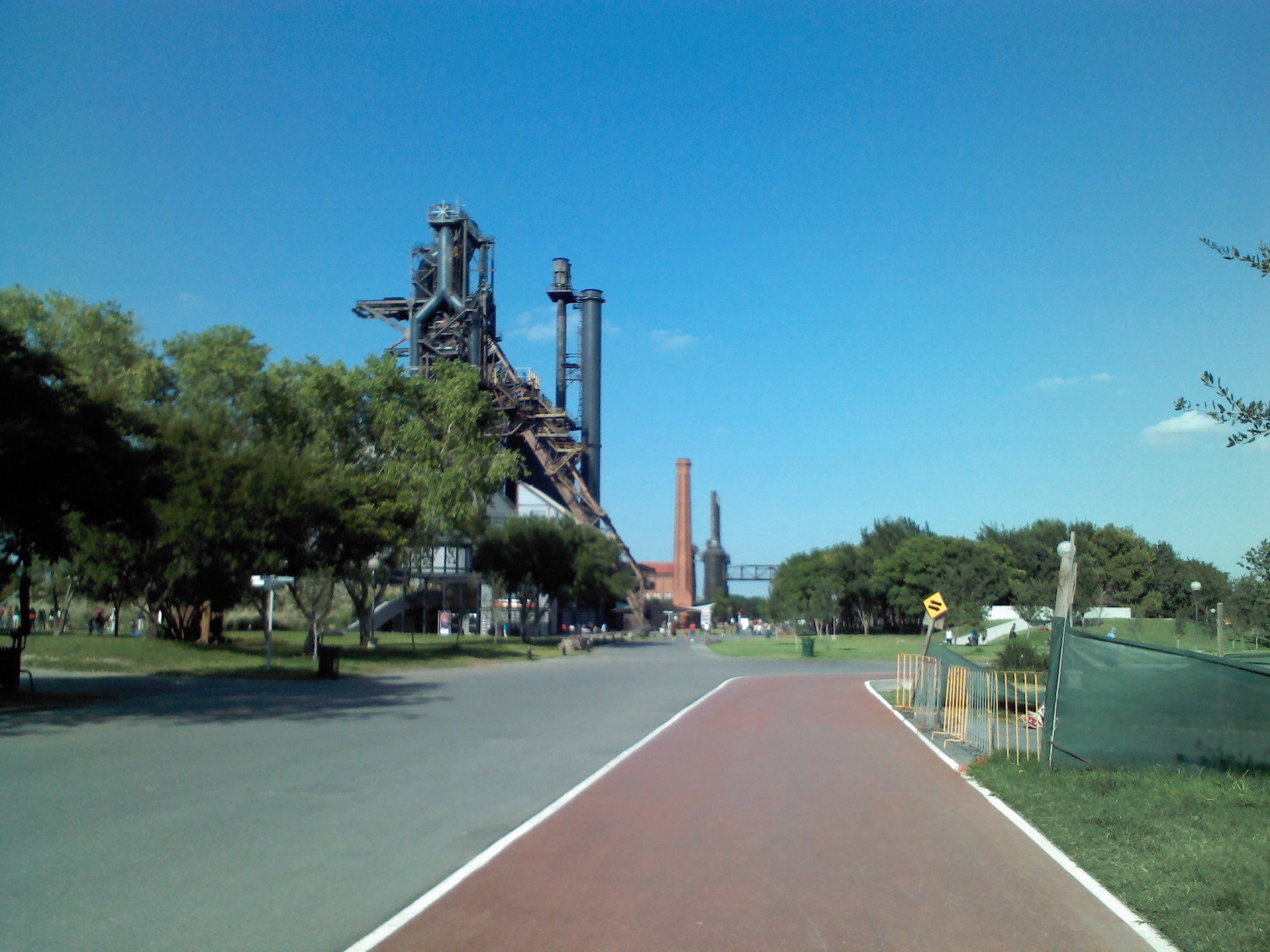
Vista al Horno 3.

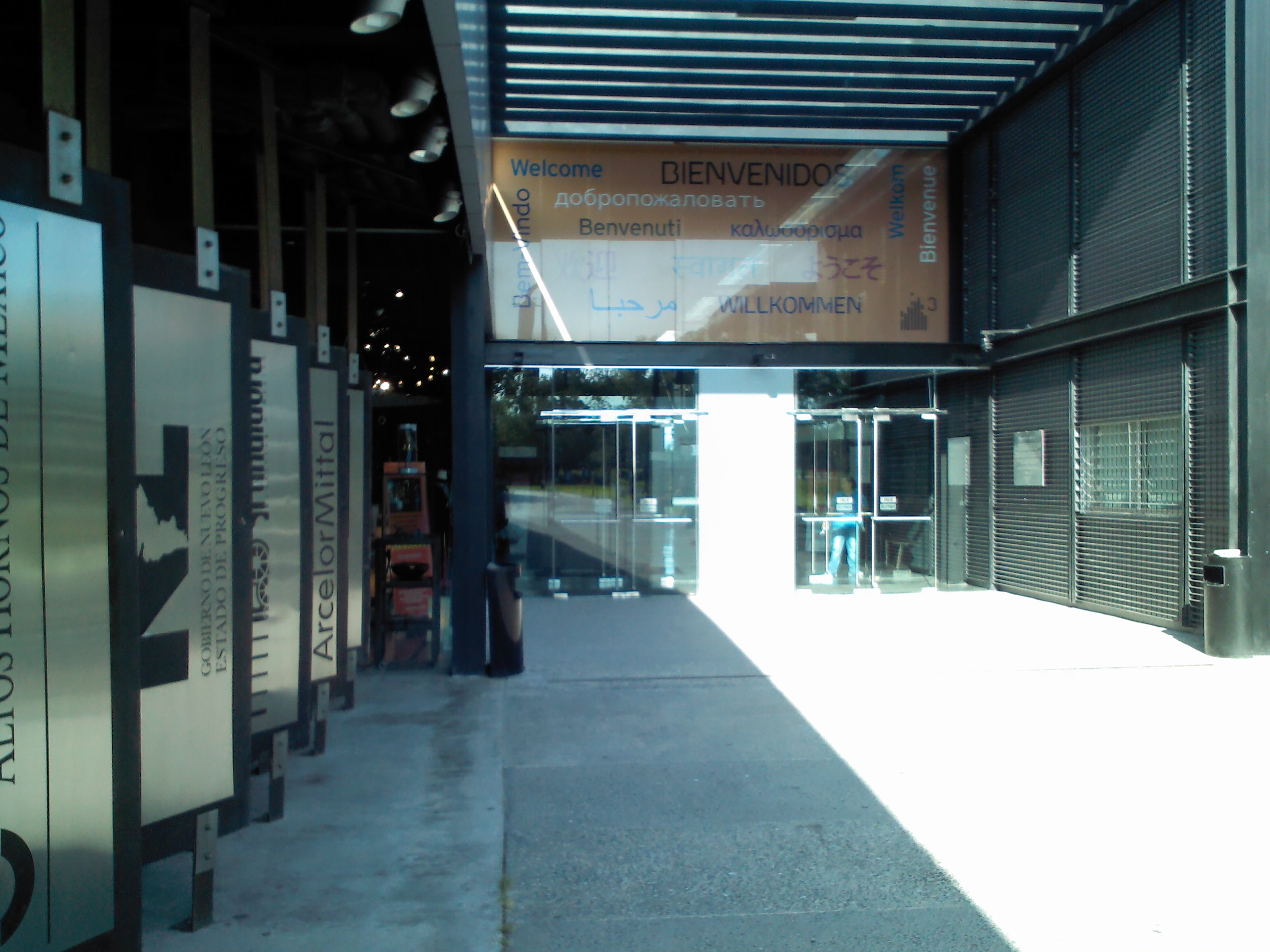
Entrada al museo.

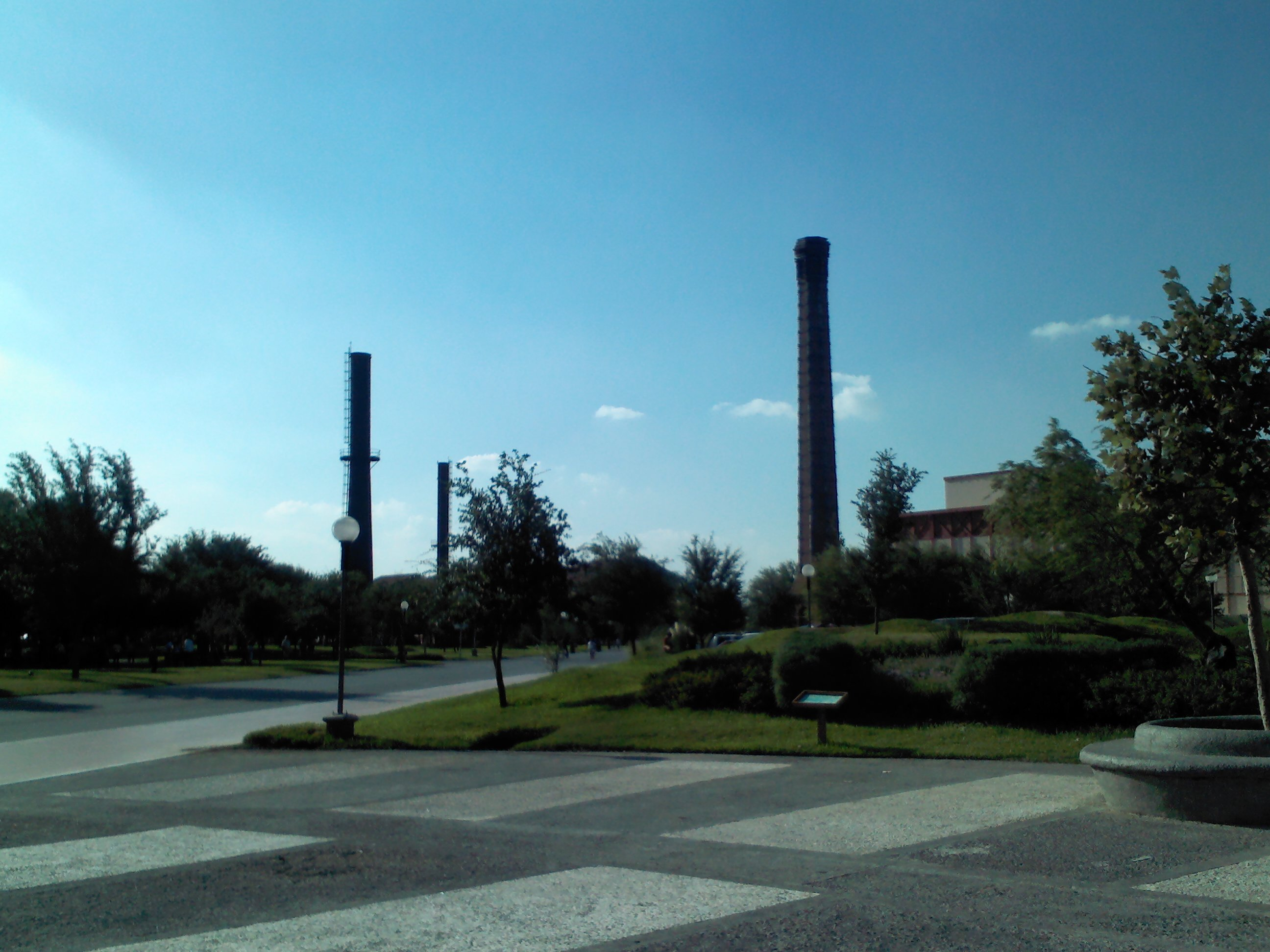
Parque Fundidora.

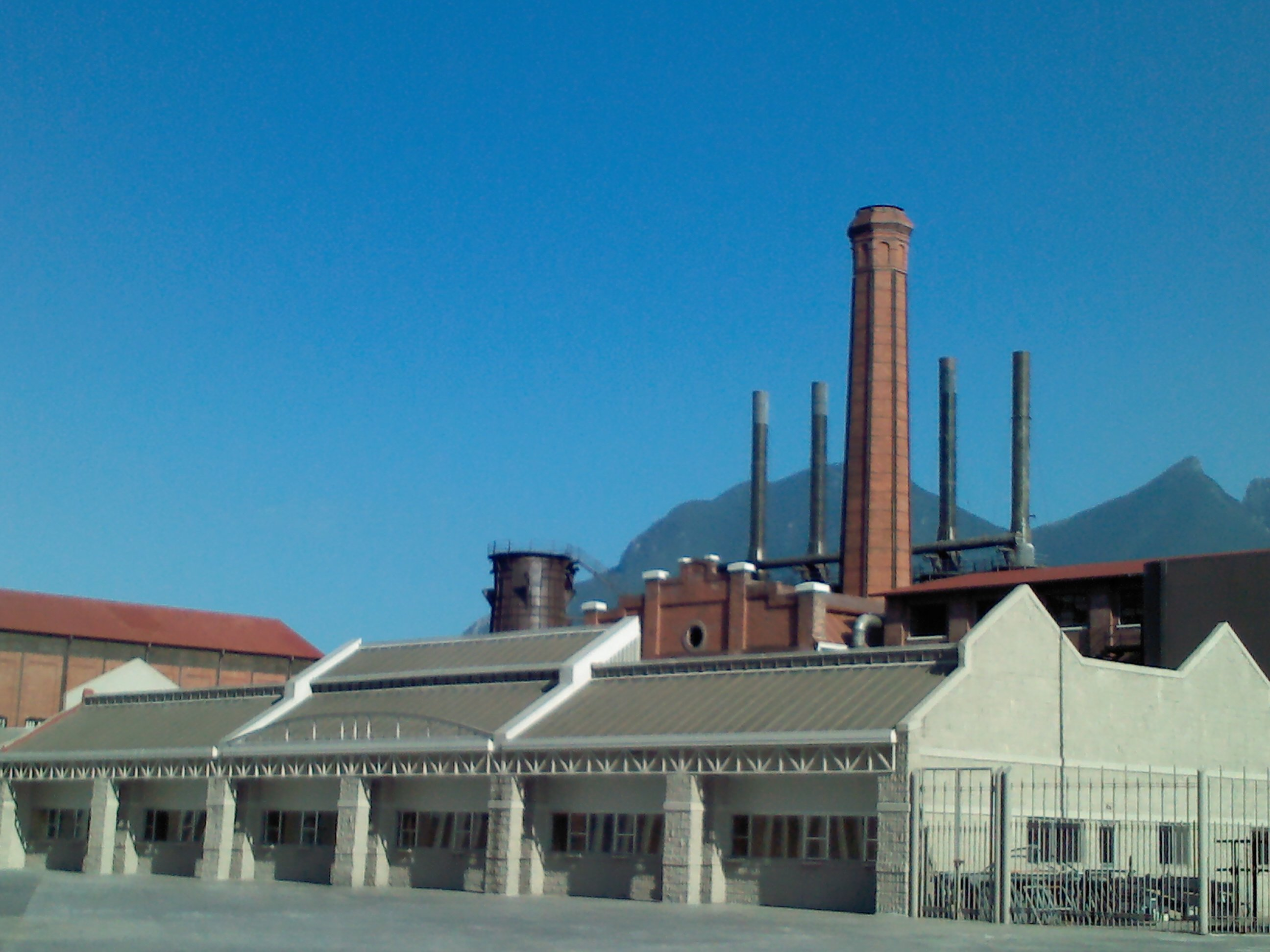
Chimeneas del parque y vista al Cerro de la Silla.

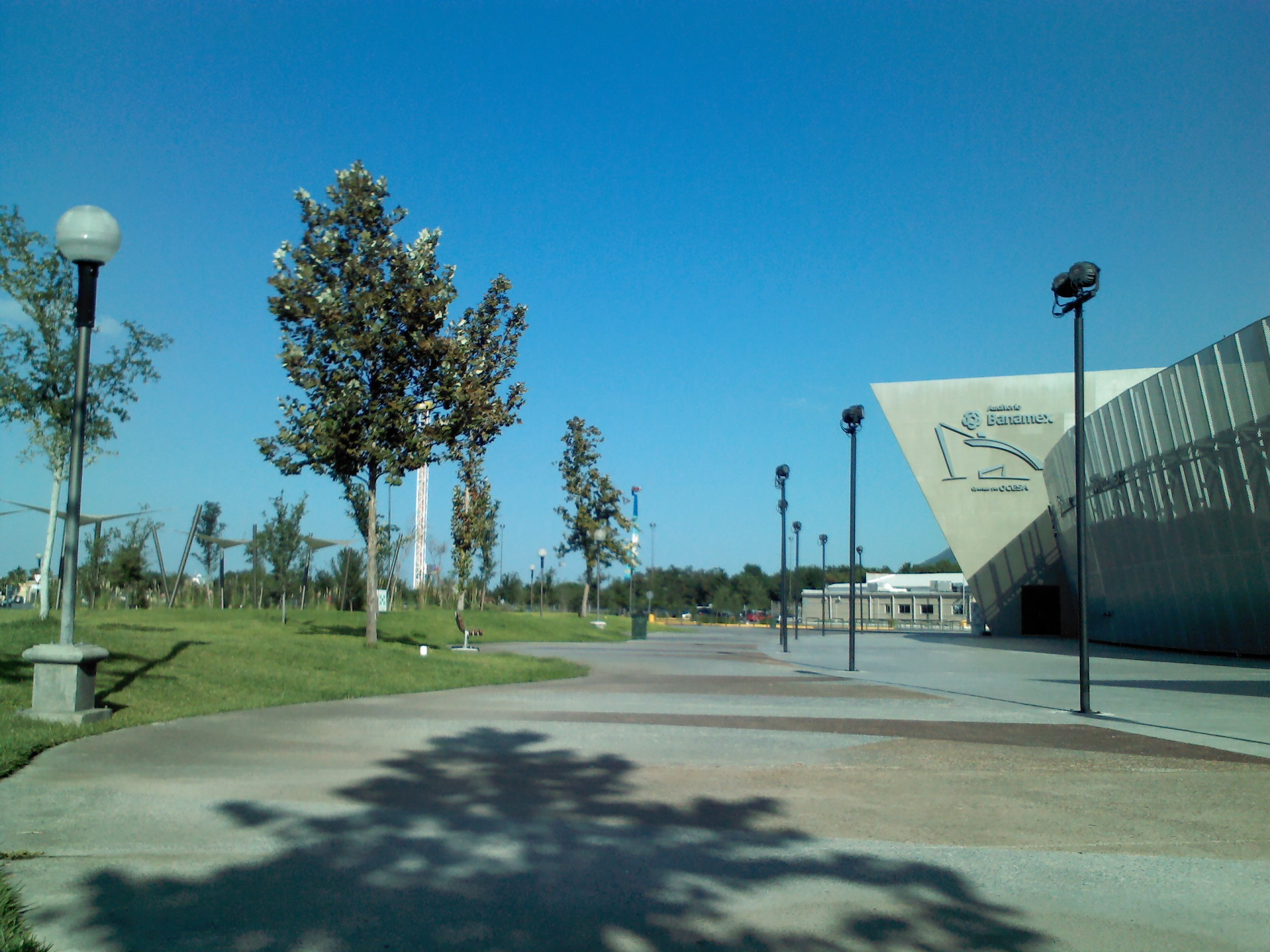
El auditorio y el parque.

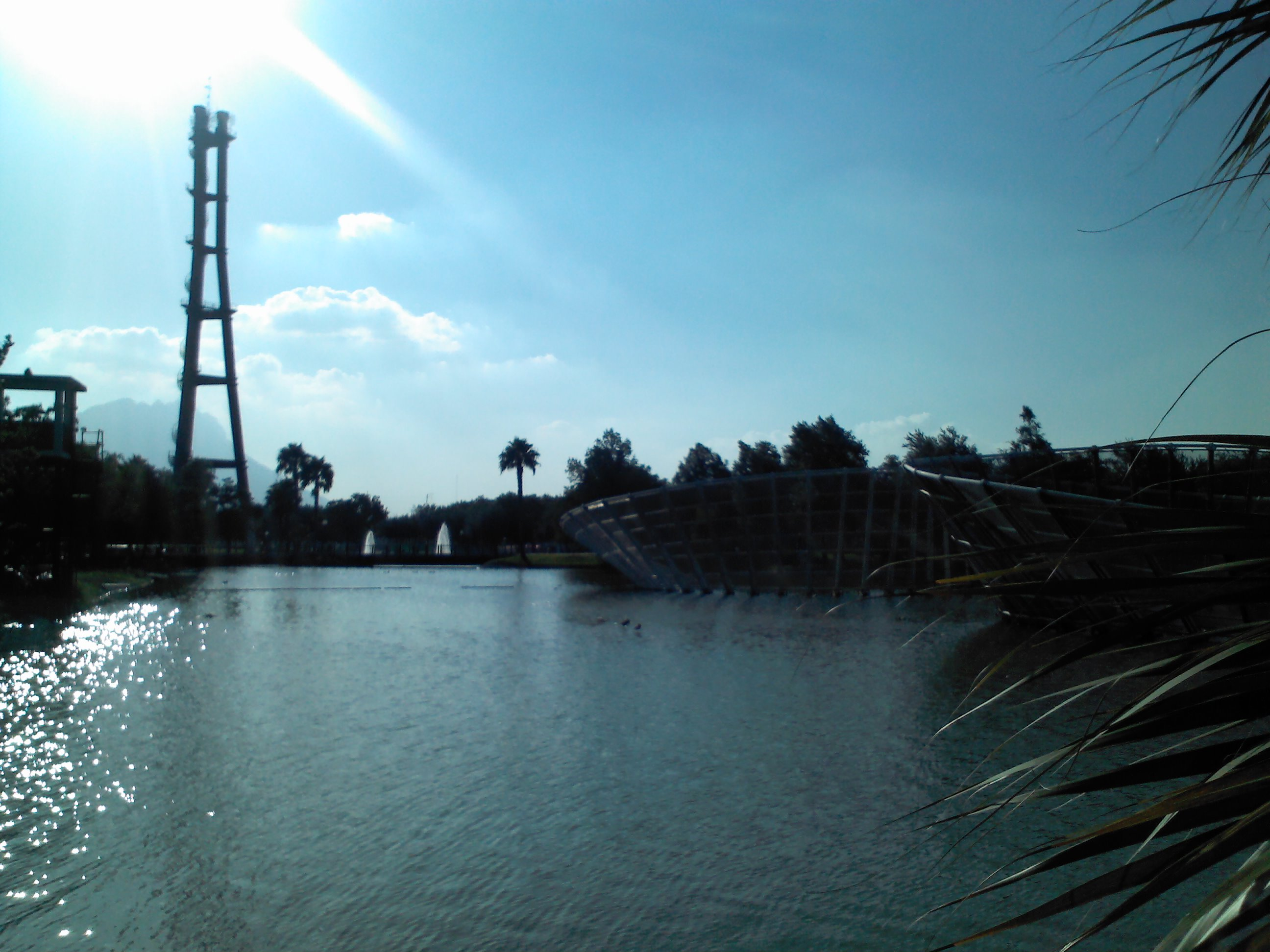
Lago Fundidora.

== Events ==
Fundidora Park Circuit
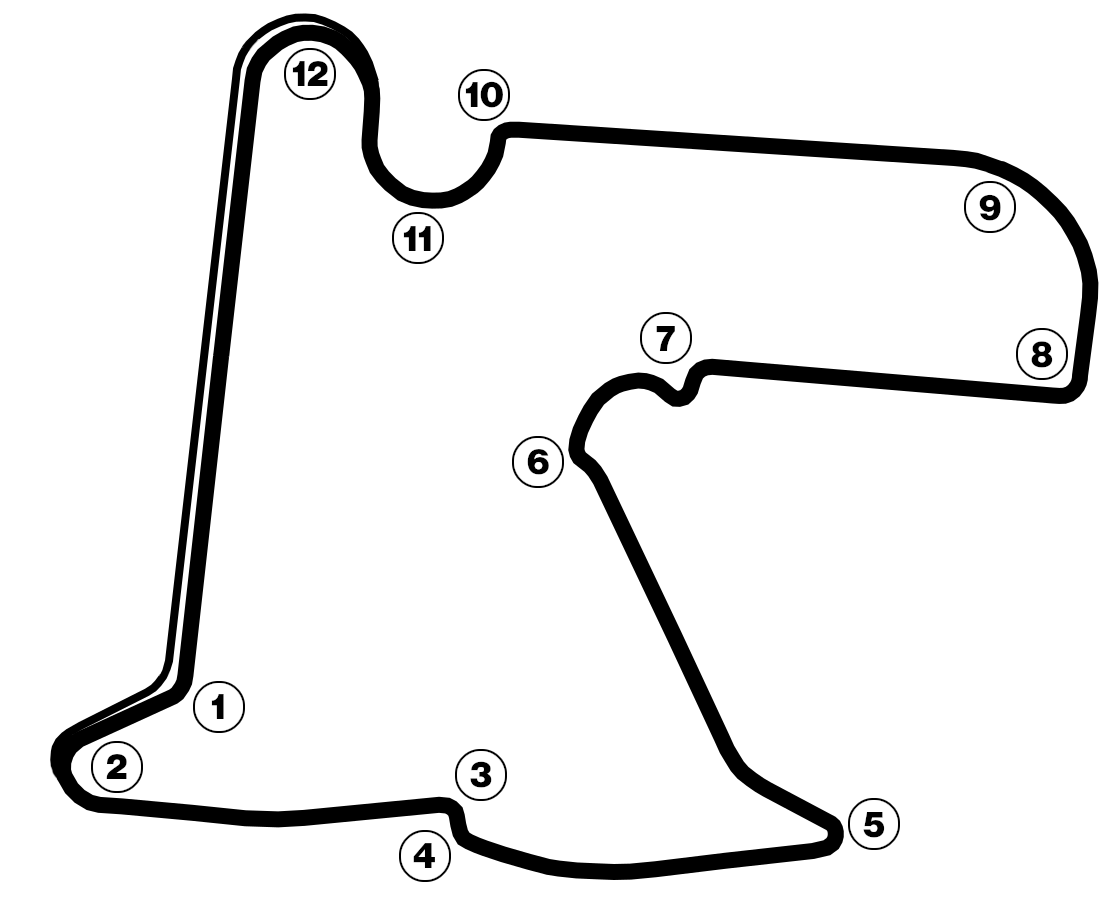
- Grand Prix Circuit (2001–2006)
- Location: Fundidora Park, Monterrey, Mexico
- Opened: 2001
- Closed: 2006
- Major events: Champ Car World Series; Tecate/Telmex Grand Prix of Monterrey (2001–2006); A1 Grand Prix (2006); Formula Atlantic (2002–2006); Barber Pro Series (2003); Indy Lights (2001)
- Website: http://www.parquefundidora.org/en

Grand Prix Circuit (2001–2006)
- Surface: Asphalt
- Length: 3.390 km (2.106 mi)
- Turns: 15
- Race lap record: 1:14.529 ( (France) Sébastien Bourdais, Lola B03/00, 2006, Champ Car)

- The Champ Car World Series Grand Prix of Monterrey was held from 2001 to 2006 (see Tecate/Telmex Grand Prix of Monterrey).
- Fundidora Park has been the venue of UN and OEA summits.
- On February 26, 2006, the Fundidora Park raceway hosted the 2005–06 A1 Grand Prix of Nations, Mexico in A1 Grand Prix racing series.
- The park was the center of the 2007 Universal Forum of Cultures. For this event, an area of 30 ha (0.30 km^{2}) was joined to the 120 original hectares and also was joined to the city's Great Plaza by the Santa Lucia Riverwalk.
- The Pal Norte music fest and the Machaca Fest are hosted in the park every year.
- The FIFA Fan Festival for the 2026 FIFA World Cup.

=== Champ Car race history ===
Season	Date	Driver	Team	Report
2001	March 11	(Brazil) Cristiano da Matta	Newman/Haas Racing	Report
2002	March 10	(Brazil) Cristiano da Matta	Newman/Haas Racing	Report
2003	March 23	(Canada) Paul Tracy	Forsythe Racing	Report
2004	May 23	(France) Sébastien Bourdais	Newman/Haas Racing	Report
2005	May 22	(Brazil) Bruno Junqueira	Newman/Haas Racing	Report
2006	May 21	(France) Sébastien Bourdais	Newman/Haas Racing	Report

=== A1GP race history ===
Season	Date	Sprint Race Winner	Feature Race Winner	Report
2005–2006	February 26	(France) Alexandre Premat	(France) Alexandre Premat	Report

=== Lap records ===
The fastest official race lap records at the Fundidora Park Circuit are listed as:

Class	Time	Driver	Vehicle	Event
Champ Car	1:14.529	(France) Sébastien Bourdais	Lola B02/00	2006 Tecate Grand Prix of Monterrey
CART	1:15.386	(Brazil) Cristiano da Matta	Lola B02/00	2002 Tecate/Telmex Monterrey Grand Prix
A1 GP	1:21.100	(France) Alexandre Prémat	Lola A1GP	2006 Monterrey A1GP round
Formula Atlantic	1:23.206	(United States) Graham Rahal	Swift 016.a	2006 Monterrey Formula Atlantic round
Indy Lights	1:24.282	(Mexico) Mario Domínguez	Lola T97/20	2001 Monterrey Indy Lights round
Barber Pro Series	1:34.095	(Mexico) David Martínez	Reynard 98E	2003 Monterrey Barber Pro round

== See also ==
- List of preserved historic blast furnaces
- Enrique Abaroa Castellanos
