= Faro del Comercio =

Monument in Mexico

Coordinates: 25°39′58.30″N 100°18′36.10″W

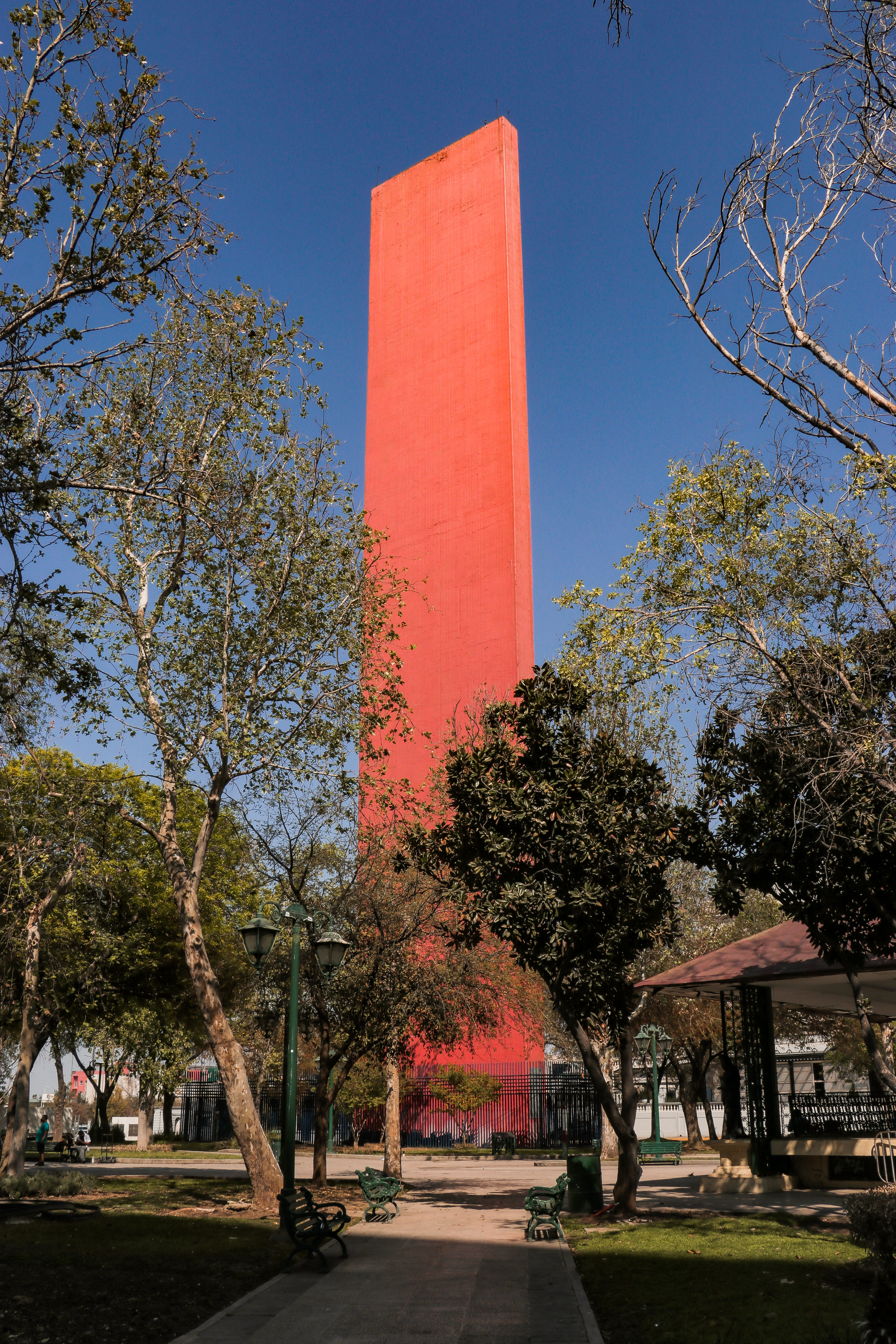

Faro del Comercio is a monument designed by the accomplished Mexican architect Luis Barragán and constructed in 1984 by architect Raúl Ferrera. It is a recognizable sight in Monterrey among many other modern manmade landmarks, such as Neptune's Fountain (Fuente de la Vida), the Monterrey City Hall, the Papal Bridge (El Puente del Papa), and the Bridge of Unity (Puente de la Unidad) in San Pedro, connecting that municipality to Monterrey. These sites are intended on one hand to complement the city's few remaining traditional landmarks, such as, the Bishopric Palace (Palacio del Obispado) and Museum, the City's Cathedral (Catedral Metropolitana de Nuestra Señora de Monterrey), the Central Post Office (old Monterrey City Hall), and the State of Nuevo León Government building, on the north end of the Macroplaza. On the other hand, they are also intended to project an image of a city that prides itself as being the most progressive large industrial city of Mexico.

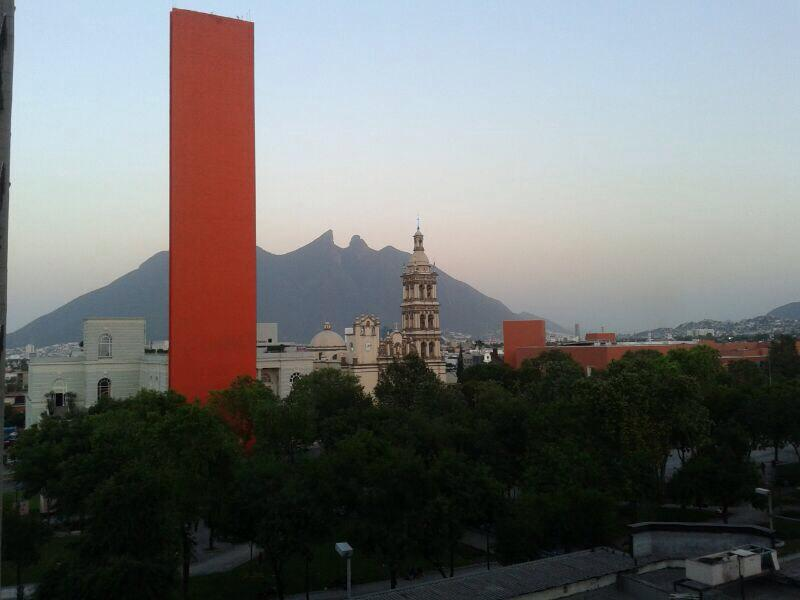
Photo of the Faro del Comercio and the Monterrey Cathedral on the right.

El Faro del Comercio was built in commemoration of the founding of the Chamber of Commerce of Monterrey's on its 100-year anniversary. It is located near the south end of the Macroplaza facing the City's Cathedral and behind the new Monterrey City Hall. El Faro del Comercio is 69.80 meters tall and 12.33 meters wide. Its bright reddish-orange color attracts attention when visiting the Macroplaza, Monterrey's central park.

At nights, the landmark frequently projects a rotating green spotlight which interrupts the city's night sky with its beam in a somewhat random cycle in the Metropolitan Area of Monterrey. Recently (2007), many large reflecting white spotlights from the nearby Museum of Mexican History Museo de Historia Mexicana and Santa Lucia Riverwalk, and around the Bishopric Hill where in 2005 the largest Mexican flag was installed (Banderas monumentales) and flown at night, as well as from high-power reflectors of many commercial establishments, clash randomly in the sky, visible from most locations in Monterrey and the surrounding areas.

After failing or being "out of commission" for several years due to an impractical technical laser mechanism which intended to have three colored lasers and a much greater visual impact on the dark skies of the surrounding areas, some of the original mechanism was salvaged and partially replaced and redesigned to have some operational ability with the green color. The redesign has some success since green is the color for which the eye is most sensitive and allows the perception of more light for the power limitations. However, the new design falls far short of the original claims for the construction. The structure was repainted after the laser renovation and reinaugurated at the 196th Independence Day Anniversary celebration on September 16, 2006.
