= Enrique Abaroa Castellanos =

Enrique Mario Abaroa Castellanos was a landscape artist and urban architect from Monterrey, Mexico. Some of the most famous large-scale projects he has worked on are the Santa Lucia Riverwalk, the design of the Fundidora Park, la Casa de Cursillos de Cristiandad San Pedro, and Parque de Investigación e Innovación Tecnológico (PITT) His work can be seen in Nuevo Leon and Mexico.

He married María Socorro Martínez Guzmán and has three children: Enrique, Mauricio, and Juan Pablo. He has seven grandchildren: Enrique, Patricio, Victoria, Helena, Marcelo, Roberta and Pablo.

== Renewable energy company ==
Grupo Desus was a renewable energy company based in the city of Monterrey in Nuevo León, Mexico that originated in 1970 "under the impulse" of Castellanos.
