= 2007 Universal Forum of Cultures =

- Begins: 20 September 2007
- Ends: 8 December 2007
- Locations: Monterrey, Mexico
- Inaugurated: The 2004 Universal Forum of Cultures in Barcelona, Spain
- Most recent: The 2007 Universal Forum of Cultures in Monterrey, Mexico

The Universal Forum of Cultures Monterrey 2007 was an international event that took place in the city of Monterrey, Mexico, starting on September and ending in December of mentioned year. The Forum, as it is commonly referred to, is a global event which takes place every 3 years, in a different city each time, and seeks to reunite citizens from a varied range of cultures, languages, religions to foster inter-cultural dialogue and to promote global civil society empowerment. It was the second edition of the Universal Forum of Cultures.

== History ==
The forum was held in Monterrey in 2007.

This event gathered an approximate 4 million visitors to Monterrey, and was mostly free of charge.

The closing ceremony started at 18:00 on December 8. An estimated 230,000 people attended the ceremony on Fundidora Park, where several events took place as part of the closing ceremony.

The biggest firework show ever seen on Latin America was the closure to the forum, with over 1,500 kg on artificial fireworks.

== Main Objectives of the 2007 Forum ==
The main objectives of the Universal Forum of the Cultures Monterrey 2007, were the following:

- To establish a Dialogue from a civil-society viewpoint, on the most relevant and urgent matters in the Global Agenda.
- To empower international civil society in becoming relevant actors in the decision-making process in their local communities.
- To promote interconnection and dialogues between the cultures of the modern world.
- To know the world through multiple perspectives and distinct cultures.
- To generate consciousness and commitment to adopt sustainable ways of life for our planet and our societies.

== Core Concepts ==
The Universal Forum of Cultures Monterrey 2007 revolved around 4 Core Concepts or Axis. These 4 topics sum up the vast majority of issues and problems faced by global civil society and will remain, according to experts, the most urgent and relevant working areas for the global community. The 4 Core Concepts of the 2007 Forum were:

- Cultural Diversity
- Sustainability
- Knowledge
- Peace

=== Cultural Diversity ===
The existence of cultural diversity in the world is an undeniable fact. People often coexist with others who share different beliefs, traditions and customs. Forum seeks to provide knowledge of the circumstances in which others live, new ways to see the world, respect our planet, and seek social advancement. Forum allowed us to understand the particular elements which entail the richness of our modern world, and seeks to identify the differences between cultures, to promote a respectful, peaceful coexistence.

=== Sustainability ===
Sustainability is an issue of major transcendence in the contemporary world, which needs to find new options for economic, social, and cultural development; seeking an improved utilization of natural resources for the benefit of the planet and its inhabitants. Forum took on this sensitive topic not only from an environmental perspective, but from a wide spectrum of approaches.

=== Knowledge ===
Knowledge is a human construction designed to organize and convey our experiences in the world. The challenge is learning how to make the best use of it so we can achieve an effective improvement in our quality of life. This topic was proposed by the 2007 Monterrey Forum, as it was not debated in Barcelona 2004.

=== Peace ===
Paving a way for peace does not only mean preventing armed warfare. In the Universal Forum of Cultures, new dialogues on peace were instituted on all levels. Peace with ourselves and the people around us, peace with our ecosystem, and peace amongst peoples and nations. Keeping in mind at all times that there can be no peace where basic needs have not been satisfied.

== Activities and Events for the 2007 Forum ==
The 4 Core Concepts of the Monterrey 2007 Forum were carried out in 4 separate activities programmes. These were:

- Dialogues
- Exhibitions
- Cultural Expressions and
- Special Projects and Events

=== Dialogues ===
The Forum Dialogues took place in the form of lectures, seminars, debates, symposium, international encounters, and other types of activities. The Dialogues were broken down into 8 continuous weeks of events, with more than 350 world level speakers and experts, and carried out in Themed Weeks. That meant, that during each particular week, all the Forum Dialogues were centered in one single topic, tackled from various angles and perspectives. There were 12 main topics, organized in 8 weeks of events.

The 8 Themed Weeks of Forum Dialogues were:

- Week 1: Peace and Spirituality, from September 25 to September 29
- Week 2: Education. Science and Technology, from October 2 to October 6
- Week 3: Cities and Population. Natural Resources, from October 9 to October 13
- Week 4: Knowledge-Based Development, from October 16 to October 20
- Week 5: Health Culture and Life Quality, from October 23 to October 27
- Week 6: Government, Participation. Human Rights and Justice, from October 30 to November 3
- Week 7: Identity. Diversity and Cultural Policies, from November 6 to November 10
- Week 8: Communication, from November 13 to November 17

=== Exhibitions ===
The 2007 Monterrey Forum did also present 16 grand exhibitions, that allowed the participants to experience the topics and concerns of the modern world via an interactive experience. Many of the Forum Exhibitions were planned and created only for this event. The exhibitions offered at the event were:

- Isis and the Feathered Serpent, produced by Miguel Angel Fernandez and curated by Zahi Hawass and Eduardo Matos, was presented in the West Wing of the Nave Lewis Exposition Centre. This exhibition presented for the first time, the similarities of two great deities, Isis in Egypt and Quetzalcoatl in Mesoamerica.
- America Migration, produced by architect Pedro Ramirez Vazquez, was presented in East Wing of the Nave Lewis Expositions Centre. This exhibition sought to portray the phenomenon of migration, from the prehistoric times to modern age.
- Buda Guanyin: Treasures of Compassion, featured for the first time outside China, 150 pieces of Buddha and were presented in the Museum of Mexican History.
- Steelworks Museum: Furnace No. 3, this new interactive museum was housed in one of the landmarks of Mexican industrial history, the Alto Horno 3 (High Furnace No. 3) which was once the backbone of the Fundidora Steelwork Company. This brand-new high tech experience will recreate the ancient art of steel production, a long-aged Monterrey tradition.
- 2501 Migrants, by Mexican artist Alejandro Santiago, and featured 2501 life-size statues made in clay, representing the phenomenon of Mexican migrations into the United States. It was housed in an open-air section of the Fundidora Park.
- Habitat: from Risk to Sustainability, this interactive, high-tech exhibition housed in the Nave Generadores presented a new outlook on the core topic of Sustainability
- Frida Kahlo, the Monterrey Forum housed a special exhibition of the finest works of Mexican artist Frida Kahlo to commemorate the centennial of her birth.
- B.A.N.G. Technological Culture, presented the newest of emerging technologies in four main areas: Bits, Atoms, Nanotechnology and Genome (hence the acronym B.A.N.G.)
- Dialogue in the Dark, an original concept by Andreas Heinecke, as an interactive, life-experience where visitors are immersed in a completely darkened room, in order to experience a day in the lives of a blind person. This project sought to sensibilize the visitor with the hardships experienced by these groups in carrying out their everyday activities. The 4 stages were guided by a real blind person.
- Principle of Uncertainty, was presented in the Centro de las Artes in Fundidora Park, and featured the works of 20 contemporary Mexican artists, whose work is closely related to the scientific method and the various approaches to knowledge.
- Monterrey: Memories of a Future, was presented in the Metropolitan Museum, and provided an insight to the rich, colourful history of this city.
- Gold and Salt, was also featured in the Centro de las Artes in Fundidora Park, and presented two boats, one filled with gold and another one with salt, to represent the cultural implications of European colonization of America, and the beginnings of trade between these continents.
- Images of the Natives in the Arts of the New Spain, presented in the Museum of Mexican History, featured classical baroque works representing the native Mexicans and their relationships with Spanish colonization.
- The New Lions, housed in the Nave Generadores Hall in Fundidora Park featured the work of contemporary local artists.
- Museo del Noreste / MUNE, is a new hall annexed to the Museum of Mexican History, which will portray the cultural, historical and social developments of Coahuila, Nuevo León, Tamaulipas and Texas, the former Republic of the Rio Grande.
- Voyage of Light, was presented in the Museo del Vidrio (Glass Museum) and will feature 60 works of contemporary art fabricated in glass.

=== Cultural Expressions ===
The 2007 Monterrey Forum provided the participants with the opportunity to experience a wide array of Cultural Expressions from all continents of the world. More than 1,000 single events ranging from 189 companies from more than 75 countries, were presented during the 80 days of the event. A promotional video for the Cultural Expressions offer can be viewed in the following link .

Some of the most relevant shows and performers that were presented during the Forum included:

- Theatre: Fulanos (South America), Tonelada de Luz (Mexico), Las Niñas de la Guerra (Mexico), The Hungry Caterpillar (Canada) among others.
- Street Performances: The Carpetbag Brigade (USA), Generik Vapeur (France), Circus Baobab (Guinea), Daniela Mercury (Brazil), Fito Páez (South America), Goran Bregovic (Bosnia and Herzegovina), Gilberto Santa Rosa (Puerto Rico), Drums of Yamato (Japan), Mariza (Portugal), among others.
- Dance Performances: National Ballet Branco Krsmanovic (Serbia), Muñequitos de Matanzas (Cuba), among others.
- Traditional Cuisine: Expert Chefs from various countries will present the richest culinary traditions of the world with live shows followed by sampling of traditional dishes.
- Music: Forum provided massive concerts with performers from all over the world, from Symphonic Orchestras to world-renowned DJs. Some of the musical events featured in the 2007 Forum include: Tim Sweeny (USA), DJ Ibojima (Sweden), DJ Tsuyoshi (Japan), Plastilina Mosh (Mexico), Inspector (Mexico), Jumbolia (Mexico), Lila Downs (Mexico), Jaguares (Mexico), Bebel Gilberto (Brazil), Daara J (Senegal), Kinky (Mexico), El Gran Silencio (Mexico), Koffi Zinsou and the Drums of Togo (Togo), Music Masters of Armenia (Armenia), Stockbridge Pipe Band (Scotland) among many others.
- Film Festivals: Forum 2007 included several Film Festivals, chief among them The Regiomontano Film Festival, The Latino Film Festival, The Immigration Film Festival and The Documentary Film Festival.
- Circus Shows: the traditional and ever-changing art of Circus acts were presented for all the participants of the 2007 Forum with acts ranging from traditional circus acts to modern, cutting-edge experiences. Performers included shows such as Circus Oz (Australia), Cirque Eloize (Canada), and Circo Atayde Hermanos (Mexico).
- Literature: Forum 2007 provided a space for literary creation and the celebration of community reading. Some of the narrators featured in Forum included: Marita Von Saltzen (Argentina), Rukhansa Khan (Canada), Martha Escudero (Mexico-Spain), JJ Abel Solares (Guatemala-Japan), Amalis Lu (Colombia), Jennifer Ramsay(Scotland), Ikaica Ruben Campos Tadeshko (Mexico/Macedonia), Willy Chilombiano (Chile), Boniface Ofogo (Cameroon-Spain), Teresa Puig among many others.
- Workshops: Forum featured large, open-air workshops for all visitors with activities and classes ranging from ornate African jewellery and percussions, to hip-hip, capoeira, belly dancing, flamenco, and many more.

=== Special Projects and Events ===
The 2007 Monterrey Forum also included a series of grand events and spaces for social participation, which took place during the course of the 80-day event. These were designed to foster communal gathering and free speech, and also to provide an access area for members of the community to participate directly with the Forum, and to experience the richness that the event entailed.

Some of these special projects and events included the following:

- Opening and closing ceremonies, which took place on September 20 and December 8, respectively.
- Signature Show, which was a daily event offered every night on the outside of the Steelworks Museum, and featured massive performances with acrobatics, smoke and light effects, music, lasers, to recreate the history of the city of Monterrey. This event was completely free of charge.
- The Peace Camps, was divided into 4 events, hosting over 350 children from various developing nations, which came together in Monterrey to interact and debate about the topic of peace. This was aimed at giving children from all over the world, the chance to speak up about this sensitive topic and for adults worldwide to have the opportunity to learn from their perspectives and experiences.
- Civil Society Plaza, was an area inside the Fundidora Park, where NGOs from all over the world were able to promote their work, establish contact with the attendees of the Forum, and network with other organizations.
- Forum University and the International Student Forum 2007 were two events that took place in the four major universities of Monterrey, and included a series of lectures, workshops and events aimed at students, teachers, researchers and members of the international academic community.
- The Municipalities Plaza, was an area also inside the main Forum venue, where representatives from various municipalities, mainly from the state of Nuevo León, and also from other states of Mexico and abroad, featured the richest elements of their cultural identities.
- School Tours, was the programme by which almost 100,000 children from various schools had daily visits to the Forum site, with a specially designed activities programme, free of charge.

== Venues ==
The Fundidora Park was the central venue for the 2007 Universal Forum of Cultures. However, this is not the only venue that hosted the more than 1000 activities that took place during the 80-day event. There are approximately 20 distinct venues that were located through the entire city. Some of the most relevant ones included:

- The Luis Elizondo Auditorium, located in the Tecnologico de Monterrey
- The Teatro de la Ciudad, the main city theatre located in the Macroplaza
- The Aula Magna, a baroque auditorium located downtown Monterrey and managed by the Universidad Autonoma de Nuevo León
- The Museum of Mexican History, which marks the start of the Paseo de Santa Lucia Riverwalk, which connects downtown and the Macroplaza with the Fundidora Park
- The Metropolitan Museum of Contemporary Arts or MARCO, one of the most celebrated museums in Northern Mexico
- The recently built Museo del Acero (Steelworks Museum) located in Fundidora, as well as the Museo del Noreste or MUNE which is an annex to the Museum of Mexican History and will showcase the rich history of Northern Mexico and Texas
- The CINTERMEX Convention Center, among many others

== Schedule of Events ==
The Schedule of Events for the 2007 Universal Forum of Cultures is now available in the Forum's website. It is to be remarked that although the 2007 Universal Forum of Cultures has ended, several expositions will be displayed until January 10, 2008.

== See also ==
- UNESCO
- World Cultural Economic Forum (WCEF)
