= Universal Forum of Cultures =

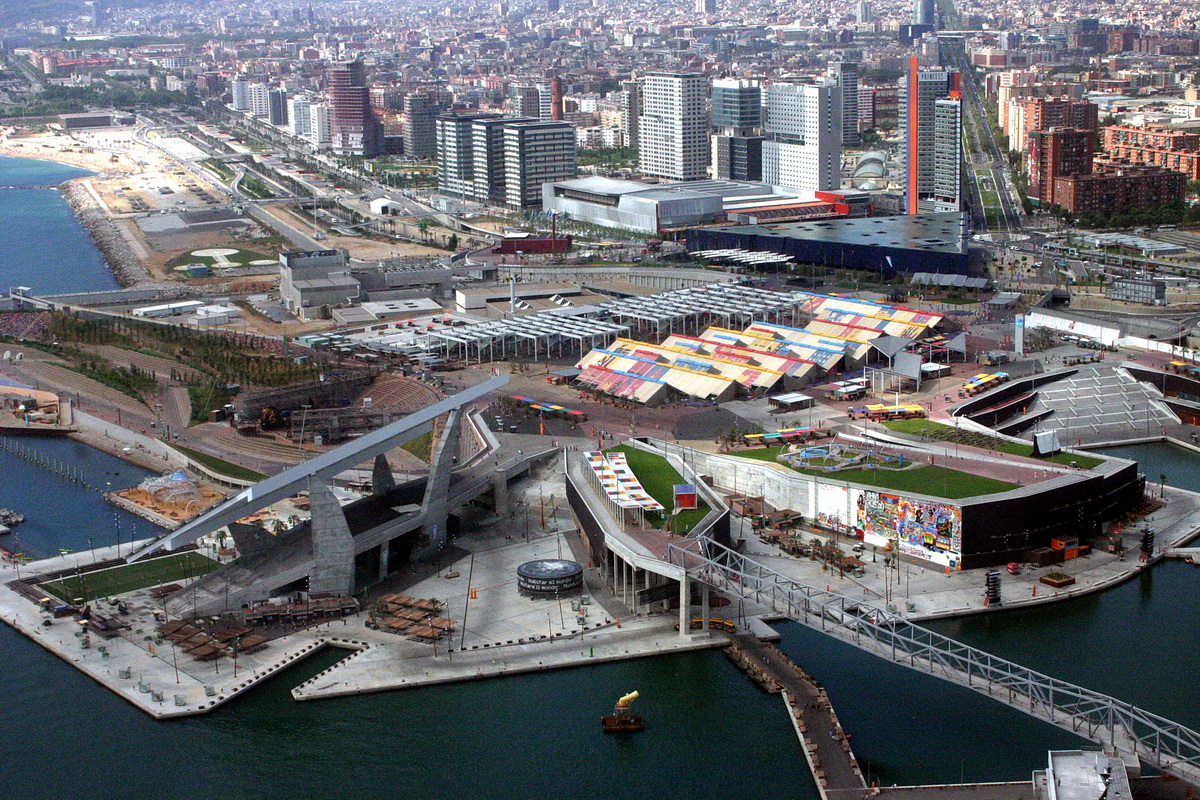
Universal Forum of Cultures, Barcelona 2004

The Universal Forum of Cultures (Catalan: Fòrum de les Cultures, was an international cultural event intended to take place every three years. This event is organized by Forum Foundation.

== History ==
The first Forum was held in Barcelona, Catalonia (Spain), from May 9 to September 26, 2004. It was organized by Barcelona's local council, the Catalan government (the Generalitat de Catalunya), the Spanish Government and UNESCO. It was conceived by Catalan prime mover (Pasqual Maragall, then Mayor of Barcelona) as a way of promoting the city's burgeoning tourist industry in the wake of the 1992 Summer Olympics. The official aims of the 2004 Universal Forum of Cultures included support for peace, sustainable development, human rights and respect for cultural diversity.

The 2007 Universal Forum of Cultures was held in Monterrey, Mexico. The event promoted Native American and "White" cultures.

Valparaíso, Chile was selected as host for the 2010 Universal Forum of Cultures.Naples, Italy was selected as host for the 2013 Universal Forum of Cultures, while both Quebec City, Canada and Amman, Jordan were selected to host the 2016 forum. Quebec City decided to back off and give Amman the whole organisation of the event.

== See also ==
- UNESCO
