= Santa Lucía riverwalk =

Walkway in Monterrey, Mexico

Coordinates: 25°40′21.28″N 100°17′53.22″W

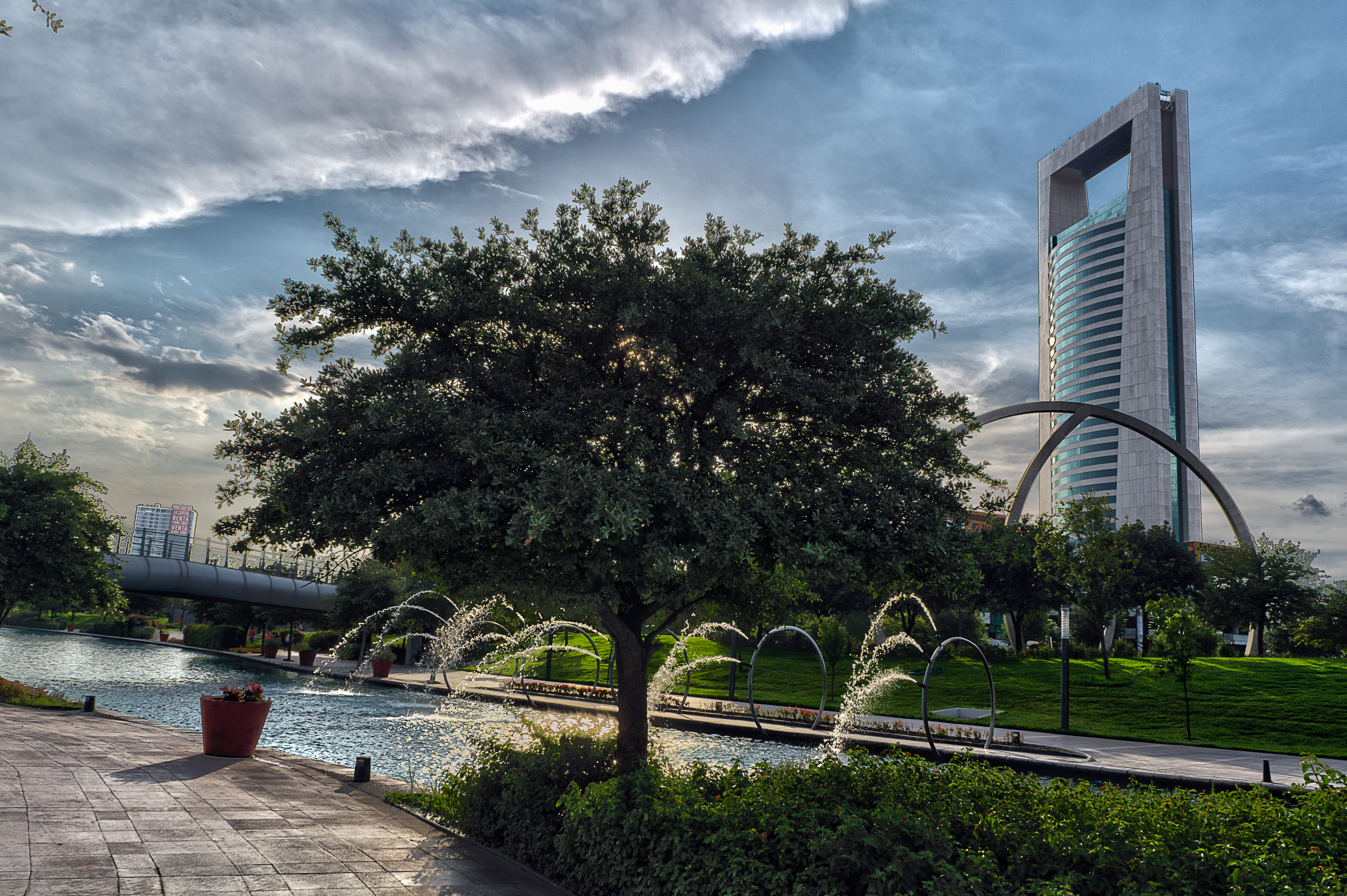
Santa Lucía and Torre Administrativa Tower

The Santa Lucia riverwalk (Spanish: Paseo Santa Lucía) is a riverwalk located in the Mexican city of Monterrey, Nuevo León.

== History ==
Construction of the river began in 1996, but for economic reasons was stopped for nine years. In 2005, construction continued and was finished in 2007. It was inaugurated by the Mexican President Felipe Calderon Hinojosa, Nuevo León's governor Natividad González Parás, and Monterrey's mayor Adalberto Madero in celebration of the 197th anniversary of the Mexican War of Independence.

It is one of the most important attractions in the city. It was also part of the 2007 Universal Forum of Cultures' attractions.

== Features ==
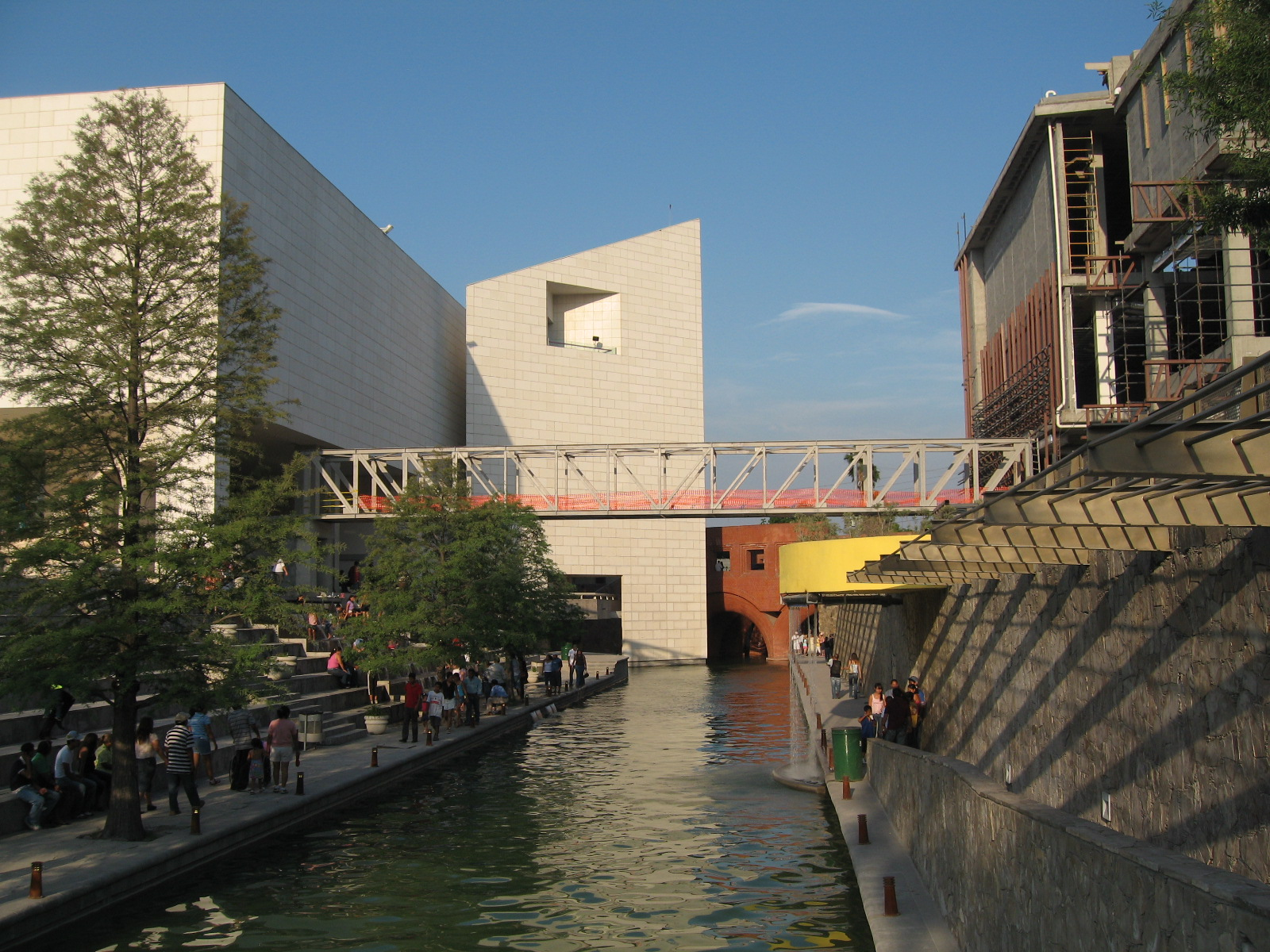
Riverwalk of Santa Lucía bridge to Museum of Mexican History

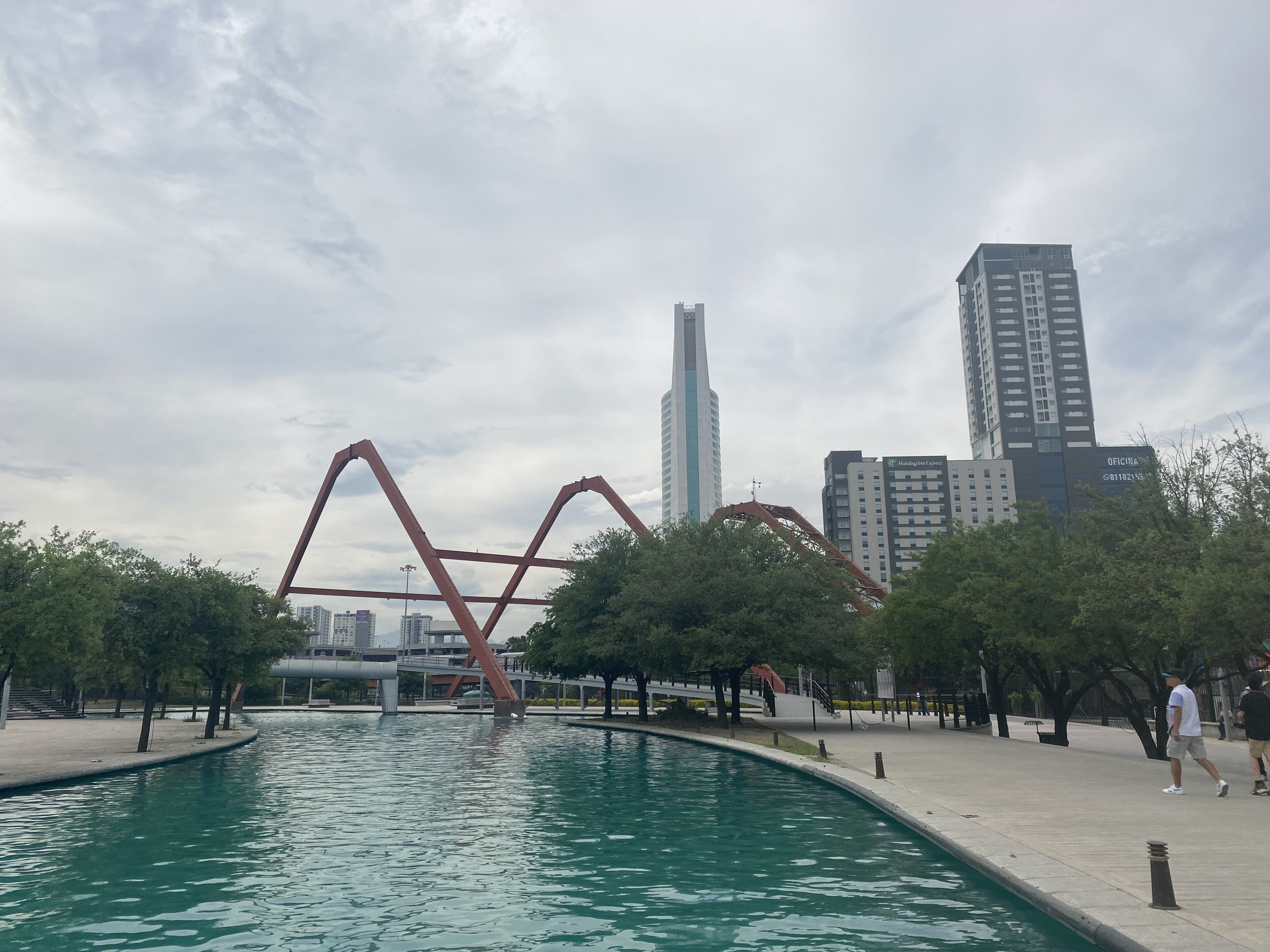
Paseo Santa Lucía with Torre Ciudadana

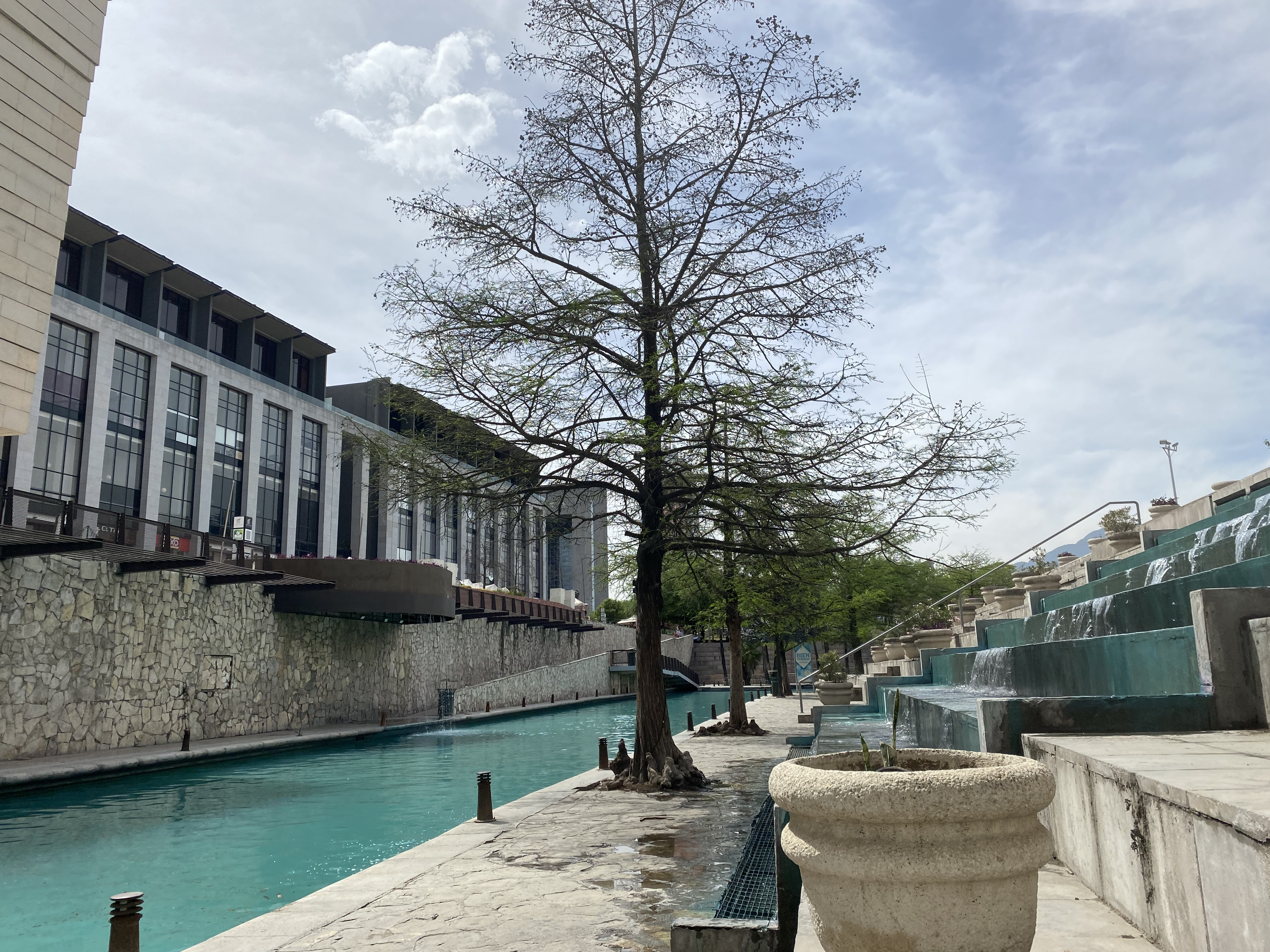
Paseo Santa Lucía viewed from the Museo de la Historia Mexicana

- It connects the Macroplaza and the Fundidora Park
- It is 1.55 miles long.
- It is 1.2 metres deep.
- It is under 24‑hour surveillance.
- The riverwalk contains several motorboats.
- It also has several fountains.
- It has one of the five authentic Inukshuk outside Canada.
- The whole Riverwalk has free wireless internet access.
