= Macroplaza =

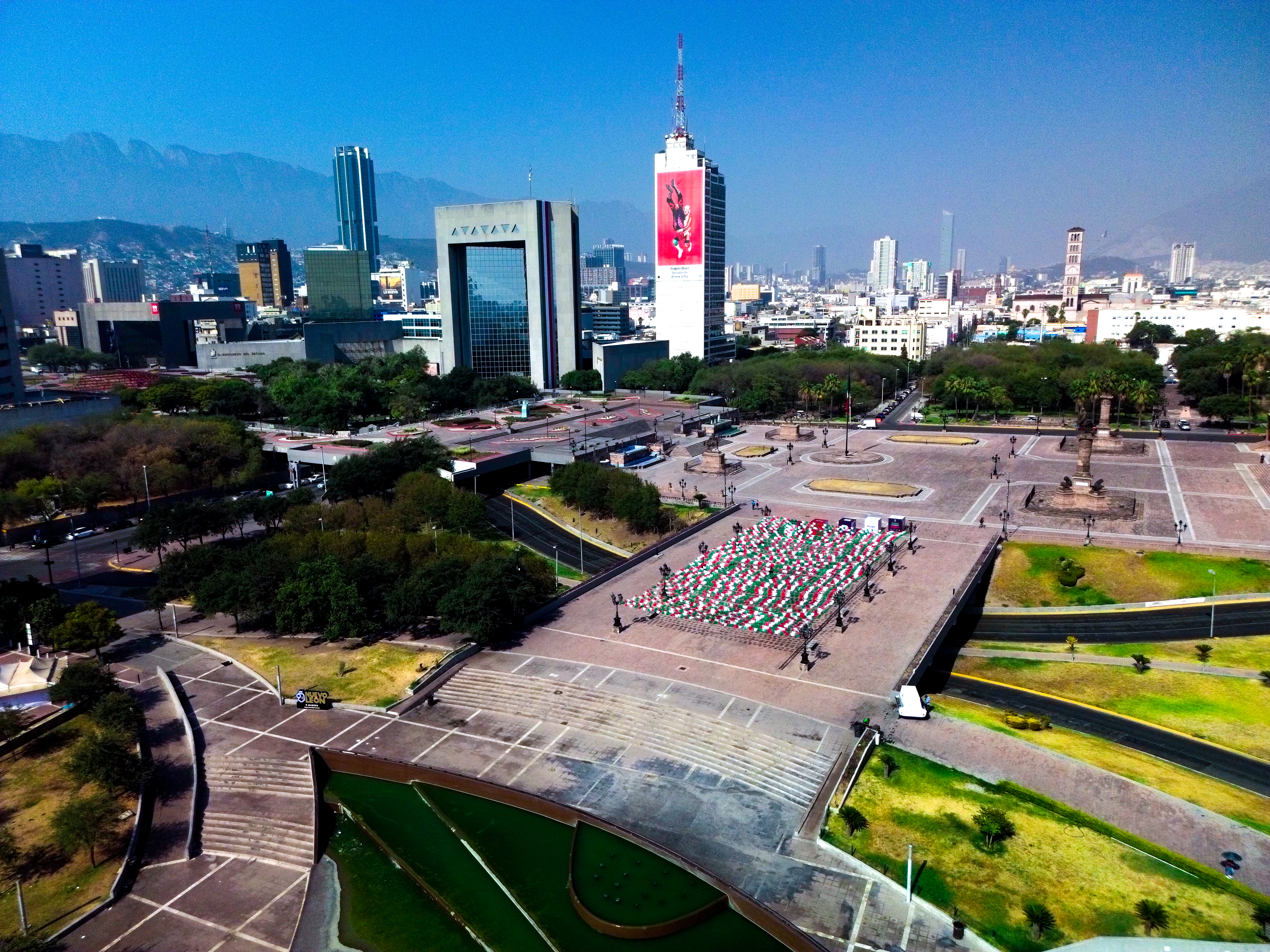
- Macroplaza and its surroundings
- Interactive map of Macroplaza

The Macroplaza or La Gran Plaza is a town square or plaza located in the heart of the city of Monterrey, Mexico. The Macroplaza is the largest Plaza in Mexico and the fifth-largest plaza in the world. It has an extension of 400,000 square metres consisting of various monuments, smaller plazas and gardens.

The Macroplaza was built in the early 1980s during the governorship of Alfonso Martínez Domínguez. The construction of the Macroplaza required the demolition of several old buildings and houses including a famous movie theater.

One of the most iconic monuments of the city is the Faro del Comercio (Lighthouse of Commerce), a 70-meter-tall modern lighthouse located in the same plaza, equipped with a green laser, that shot its light around the city at nights.

== Landmarks ==
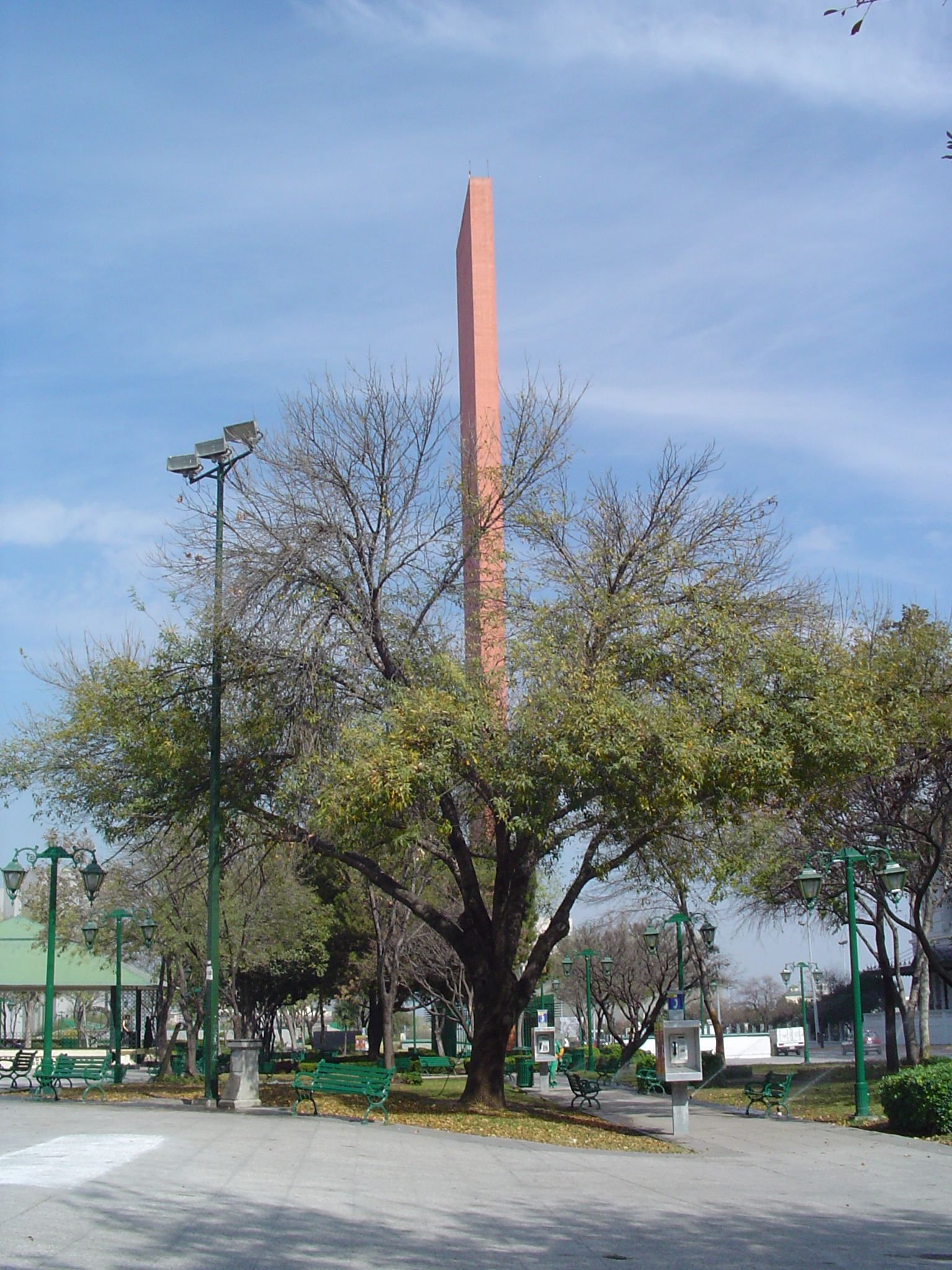
Faro del Comercio

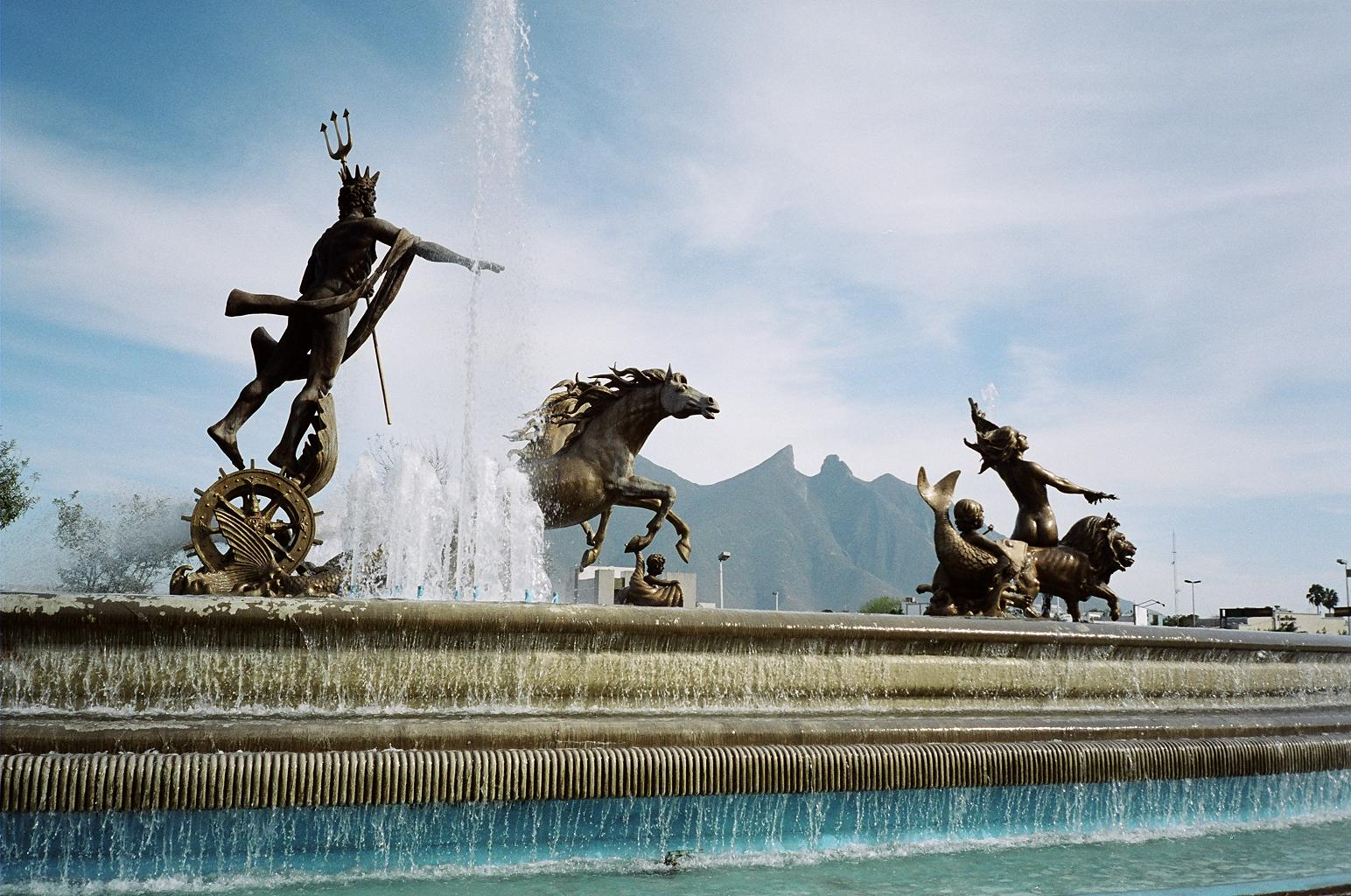
Fuente de Neptuno in front and the Cerro de la Silla in the background

The Macroplaza is very famous and its features are the following monuments, buildings and pedestrian zones:

- Palacio de Gobierno, a neoclassical construction where the office of the governor is located.
- Faro del Comercio, a modern monument designed by architect Luis Barragán. At nights it shoots a green laser around the city.
- Explanada de los Heroes, a 19,400-square-meter esplanade located in front of the Palacio de Gobierno.
- Jardín Hundido (aka Parque Hundido), an almost hidden garden located in the heart of the Macroplaza featuring various monuments and a fountain. A Speakers' Corner, similar to that located in London's Hyde Park, is located in the Jardín Hundido.
- Teatro de la Ciudad.
- Biblioteca Fray Servando Teresa de Mier, a public library.
- Fuente de Neptuno (aka Fuente de la Vida), a bronze fountain representing the Roman god Neptune.
- Capilla de los Dulces Nombres, a 19th-century Roman Catholic chapel.
- Plaza Zaragoza, the old city plaza located between the Cathedral and the original city hall building (now the Museo Metropolitano de Monterrey).
- Monterrey City Hall (aka el Palacio de Cristal), the headquarters of the Mayor of Monterrey.
- Homenaje al Sol, a monument designed by Rufino Tamayo located at the southernmost point of the Macroplaza.

The Macroplaza is surrounded by many buildings such as the Cathedral of Monterrey, the Latino tower (Edificio Latino), the Museum of Contemporary Art of Monterrey (MARCO), the Acero tower (Edificio Acero), The Metropolitan Museum (Museo Metropolitano de Monterrey), the Museum of Mexican History and the Museum of the Northwest but none of them are part of the Macroplaza.

Other attractions within walking distance of the Macroplaza include the Morelos pedestrian street to the west, the Plaza de los 400 años, the Santa Lucia Riverwalk to the east as well as the Barrio Antiguo.

== Transportation ==
The Macroplaza is accessible via Monterrey Metro, with the Zaragoza station located in the centre of the Macroplaza, near the Fuente de Neptuno. It also includes a parking lot area.

== See also ==
- List of city squares
