= List of lagomorphs described in the 2000s =

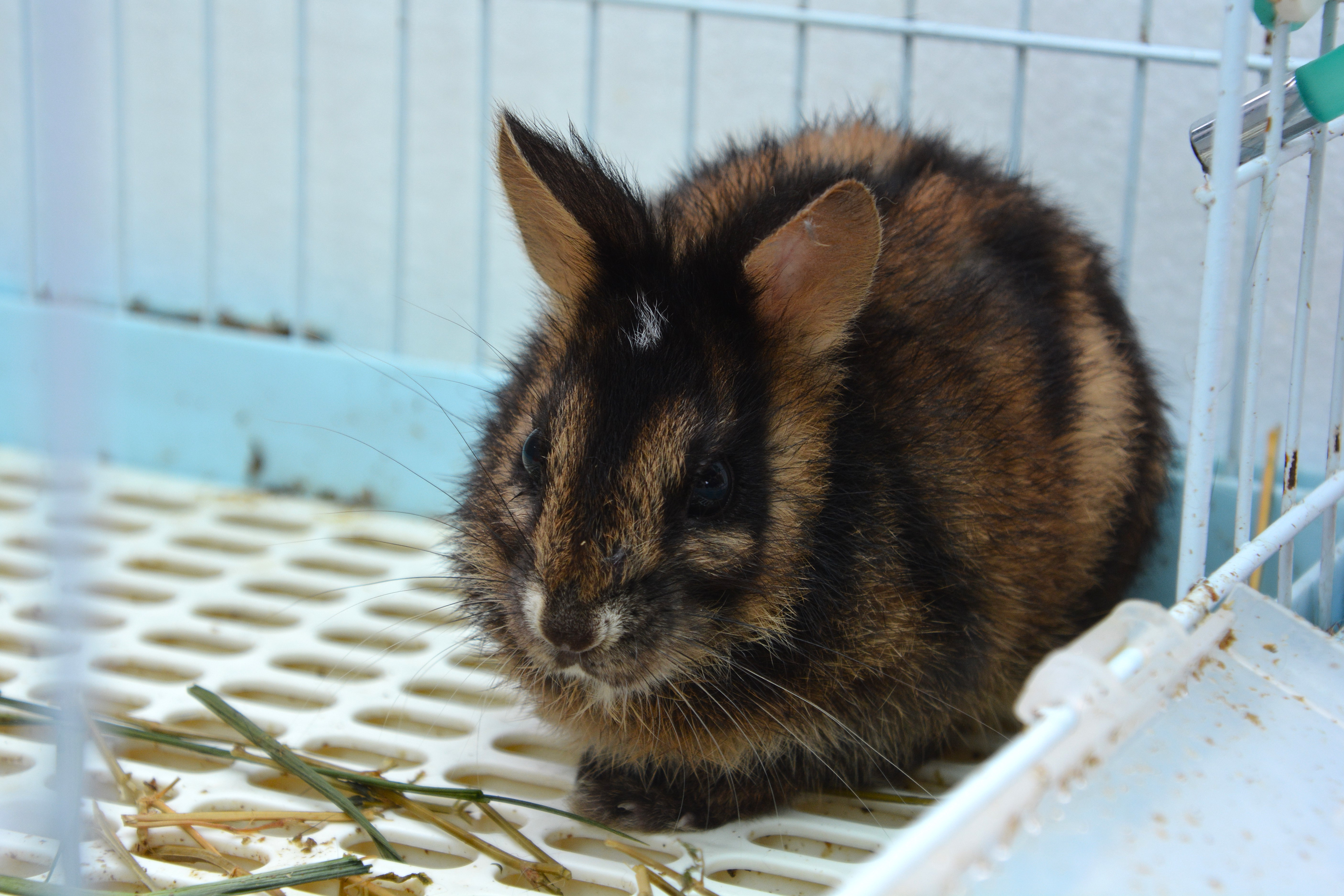
Annamite striped rabbit

This page is a list of species of the order Lagomorpha discovered in the 2000s. See also parent page Mammals discovered in the 2000s.

== Black pika Ochotona nigritia (2000) ==
The black pika is a new species of pika.

== Venezuelan lowland rabbit Sylvilagus varynaensis (2000) ==
The Venezuelan lowland rabbit is a new species of cottontail rabbit described in 2000, and named Sylvilagus varynaensis. It is the largest and darkest of the Venezuelan rabbits.

== Annamite striped rabbit Nesolagus timminsi (late 90s/2000) ==
The Annamite striped rabbit Nesolagus timminsi was discovered in the mountain forests in Vietnam and Laos. Its existence was first made known as food for sale on a market stall. It is a member of a genus previously only known from the Sumatran striped rabbit (N. netscheri). Since its discovery, the Annamite striped rabbit has been found in many locations throughout Vietnam.
