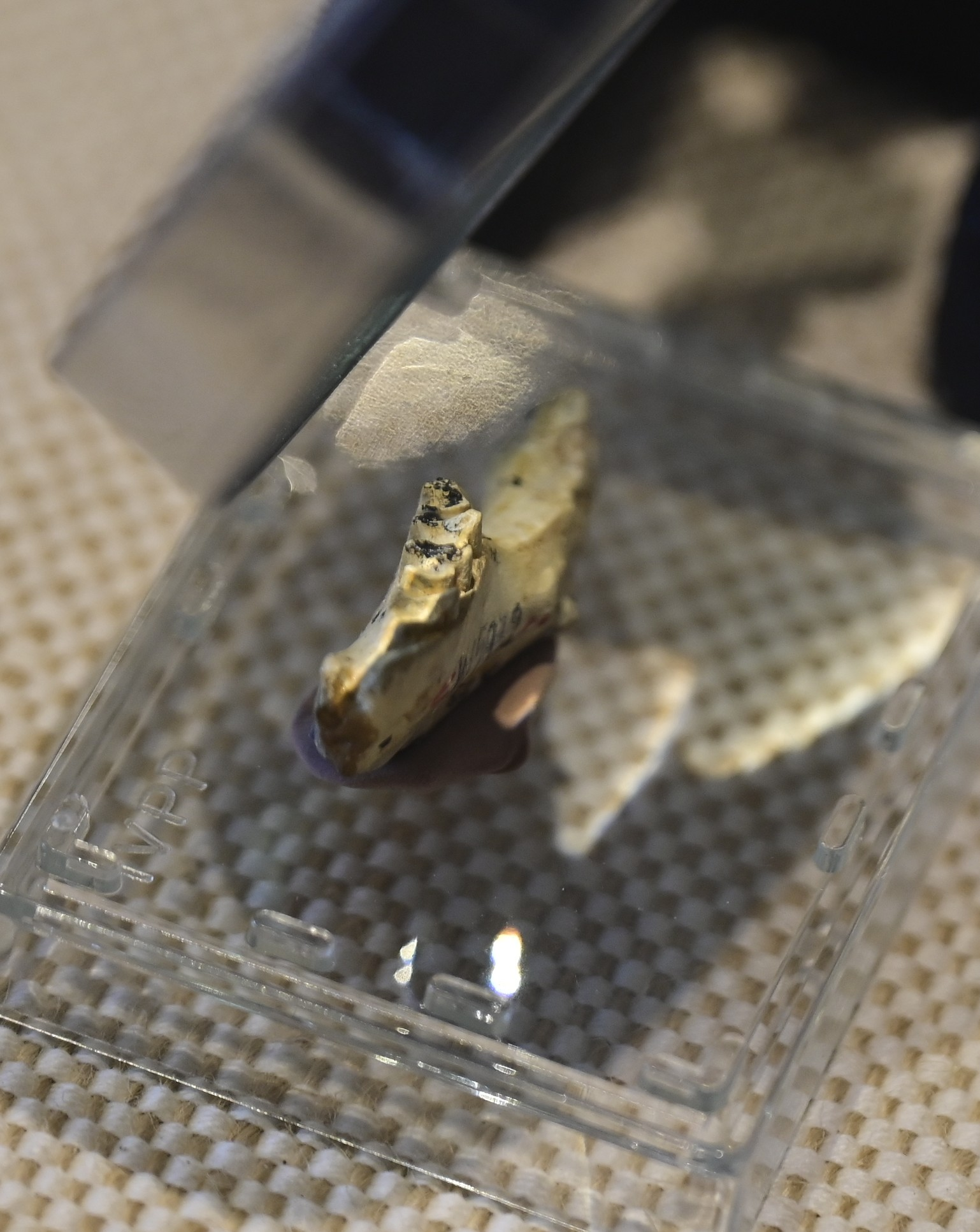
- Fossil jaw, Paleozoological Museum of China

Scientific classification
- Kingdom: Animalia
- Phylum: Chordata
- Class: Mammalia
- Infraclass: Placentalia
- Order: Lagomorpha
- Family: Leporidae
- Genus: Nesolagus
- Species: †N. sinensis

Binomial name
- †Nesolagus sinensis Jin, Tomida, Wang & Zhang, 2010

= Nesolagus sinensis =

Nesolagus sinensis Temporal range: Early Pleistocene 1.6–1.2 Ma

Extinct species of rabbit

Nesolagus sinensis is a fossil species of striped rabbit (genus Nesolagus) from the early Middle Pleistocene "Gigantopithecus fauna" of Guangxi Zhuang Autonomous Region, China. It is believed to be ancestral to the living members of the genus, and to have evolved from the Miocene genus Alilepus. It is the first fossil taxon in its genus, and the only leporid in the Gigantopithecus fauna.

== Description ==
Nesolagus sinensis is smaller than Nesolagus timminsi, and similar in size to N. netscheri, but can be distinguished from both by dental characters, including a larger talonid on the third molar.
