= Alilepus =

Scientific classification
- Kingdom: Animalia
- Phylum: Chordata
- Class: Mammalia
- Infraclass: Placentalia
- Order: Lagomorpha
- Family: Leporidae
- Genus: †Alilepus; Dice, 1931

Type species
- Alilepus annectens (Schlosser, 1924)

Synonyms
- Veterilepus Radulesco & Samson, 1967

Extinct genus of mammals

Alilepus is an extinct genus of rabbit from the Miocene to Pliocene of North America and Eurasia. The type species is Alilepus annectens, which had previously been described as Lepus annectens in 1924. Alilepus may be a direct ancestor of the extant striped rabbit, Nesolagus.

== Species ==
- Alilepus laskarewi (=Lepus laskarewi; sometimes spelled lascarevi, lascarewi, or laskarevi)
- Alilepus hungaricus (=Veterilepus hungaricus)
- Alilepus ucrainicus
- Alilepus turolensis
- Alilepus meini
- Alilepus longisinuosus
- Alilepus lii
- Alilepus elongatus
- Alilepus hibbardi
- Alilepus vagus? (=Pratilepus vagus)
- Alilepus zhoukoudianensis?
