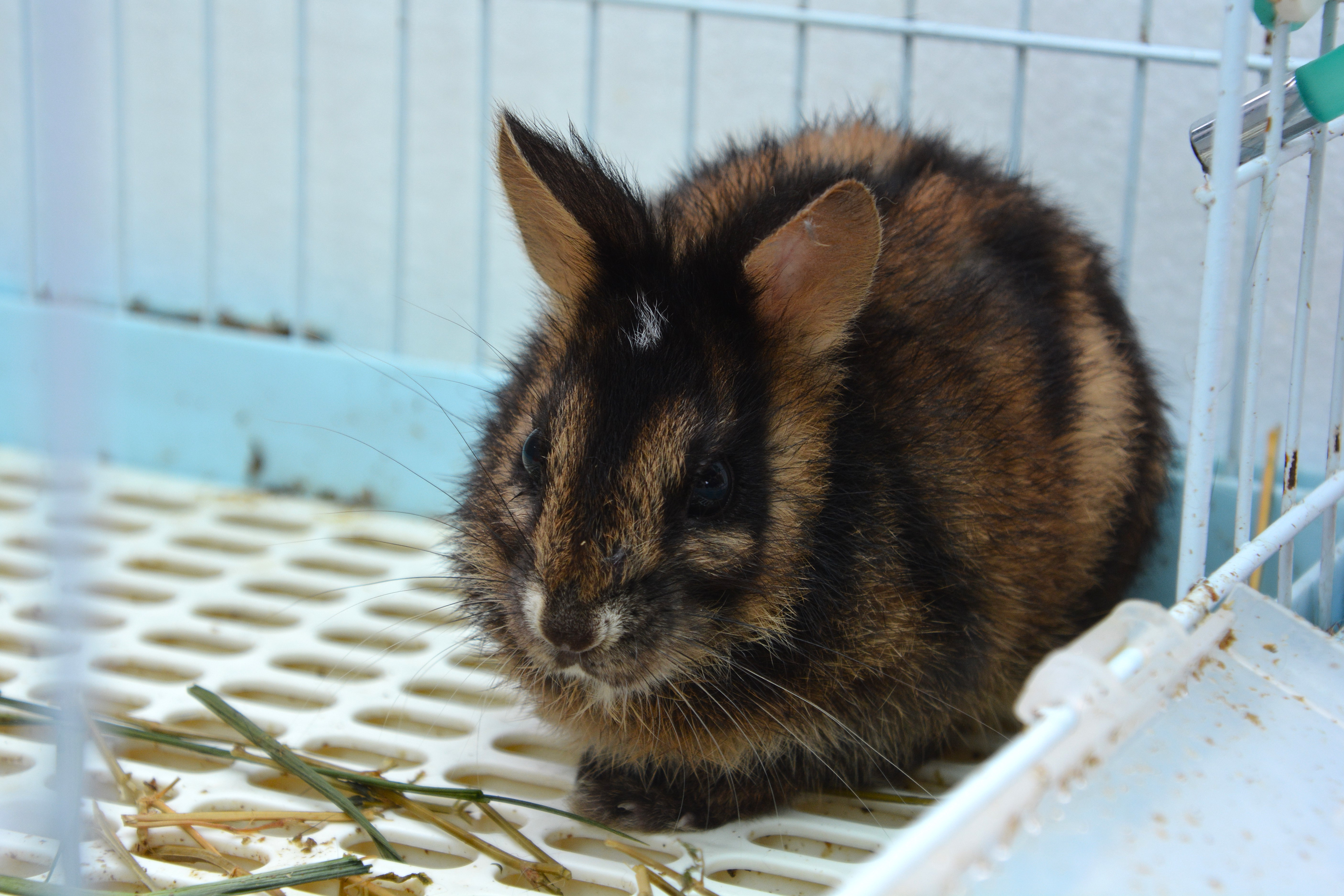
- In captivity

Conservation status
- Endangered (IUCN 3.1)

Scientific classification
- Kingdom: Animalia
- Phylum: Chordata
- Class: Mammalia
- Order: Lagomorpha
- Family: Leporidae
- Genus: Nesolagus
- Species: N. timminsi

Binomial name
- Nesolagus timminsi Averianov, Abramov, & Tikhonov, 2000
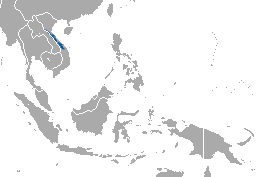
- Annamite striped rabbit range

= Annamite striped rabbit =

Species of mammal from southeast Asia

The Annamite striped rabbit (Nesolagus timminsi) is a species of rabbit native to the Annamite mountain range on the Laos–Vietnam border. The rabbit has short ears, black or dark brown stripes against a buff-colored body, and a red rump. It resembles the Sumatran striped rabbit, a closely related species that lives in the Barisan Mountains of Indonesia. The species was first observed in 1996 by biologist Robert Timmins in a market in Ban Lak in Laos, and was formally described in 2000, when it was named after Timmins' find. It is known as the thỏ vằn in Vietnamese and ka tai lai seua in Lao.

Little is known about the Annamite striped rabbit's ecology and behavior. It is herbivorous and lives a solitary lifestyle. As many large carnivores within its range have declined in population, the rabbit is thought to be threatened only by one predator, the leopard cat. It lives alongside the Burmese hare, a species that is more widespread across Southeast Asia. The Annamite striped rabbit is threatened by hunting and poaching and is listed by the International Union for Conservation of Nature as an endangered species. Efforts to conserve the existing rabbit populations include captive breeding programs and removal of snare traps.

== Discovery and taxonomy ==
Until 1996, the only known species belonging to the genus Nesolagus was the Sumatran striped rabbit (Nesolagus netscheri), a species restricted to the Sumatran mountain range of Bukit Barisan and known since the late 19th century. The first description of the Annamite striped rabbit came several years after evidence of striped rabbits was found outside of Sumatra in the late 20th century, in the form of ten specimens collected from the Annamite Range in Laos and Vietnam and a single photograph of a live striped rabbit. Genetic analysis of the specimens found significant differences in mitochondrial DNA from the known Sumatran striped rabbit. A new species, Nesolagus timminsi, was erected based on differences in skull length, relative premolar size and shape, and its smaller foramen lacerum.

The authors of the new species description named it after Robert J. Timmins, who first recorded the species in Laos from a market in Ban Lak. The species' type locality was noted as being about 10 kilometers (6.2 mi) south of Nuoc Sot village in the commune of Sơn Kim, Hương Sơn district, Hà Tĩnh province, Vietnam. There are no described subspecies of the rabbit.

The extinct species Nesolagus sinensis is presumed to be the direct ancestor of the Annamite striped rabbit. Its fossils have been found in Chongzuo, Guangxi, China, which borders Vietnam.

== Description ==
The Annamite striped rabbit is a short-eared, short-tailed rabbit with black or dark brown stripes running along its body against the buff base color of its fur. A single dark stripe runs along the rabbit's body from its nose to the base of its tail. Stripes run up from under the eyes along the ears, forking near the eyes. It has a rust-colored rump and is white on its underside. No typical measurements are available for the species due to the absence of a complete specimen, besides one measurement of a skull that describes its greatest length as 78.9 millimeters (3.11 in).

It resembles the Sumatran striped rabbit morphologically, but has a cranium that is roughly 12% larger. Compared to the Sumatran striped rabbit, the Annamite striped rabbit additionally has a narrow, small foramen lacerum (a triangular hole in the base of the skull) and a small frontal supraorbital process (the part of the skull directly above the eyes) that has a shorter posterior projection and completely lacks an anterior projection. Further research on the Annamite striped rabbit has been suggested to determine if any variations occur across its distribution.

== Distribution and habitat ==
The Annamite striped rabbit's distribution includes the northern, central, and southern regions of the Annamite Range. It is known from Vietnam and Laos; photos of the rabbit were taken only in Vietnam for several years, with the first photo of a live specimen seen in Laos being published in 2007. Molecular analysis indicates that the two diverged from a common ancestor about eight million years ago, in the Pliocene epoch. N. timminsi apparently coexists with the Burmese hare (Lepus peguensis) in a sympatric relationship. The species' distribution is predicted to shrink by more than half its current size by 2060, with existing populations becoming more reliant on climatically stable regions spanning the Vietnam-Laos border.

Annamite striped rabbits live in wet evergreen forest habitats, and have been found at altitudes ranging from 50 to 1,400 meters (160 to 4,590 ft) above sea level. These habitats are characterized by palm species in the genera Licuala and Lanonia that require a consistently wet climate, and the Dalat pine, which prefers shorter dry seasons. While the species could potentially live closer to sea level, there are few extant habitats at such low elevations. It is not found in drier evergreen forests, but in wet regions has been recorded in heavily logged rice fields and degraded forests. Most of its suitable habitat exists in Vietnam, and it is only seen in Laos along the country's eastern border. A population of Annamite striped rabbits was discovered in the southern Annamites in 2021, in Lâm Đồng province, Vietnam, separated from the northern and central Annamite populations by a stretch of dry forest.

== Behavior and ecology ==
The Annamite striped rabbit is nocturnal and herbivorous. Records from camera traps indicate that it is a solitary animal, with one study reporting only one pair of rabbits found in 104 recorded events. Little is known about N. timminsi with regard to its reproduction, as its young have been found on only two occasions: one pair of kittens in a shallow depression found in January and another pair of 10–12 week old rabbits found in May. Females closely guard their young, and adults generally avoid open areas.

Because many of the larger carnivores have been depleted throughout its distribution, the only likely predator of the rabbit is the leopard cat. It is unknown if any parasites or diseases affect the species.

== Threats and conservation ==
The Annamite striped rabbit is primarily threatened by hunting, as it is often caught in snare traps set both by subsistence hunters and poachers. Hunting by dogs likely also has an impact on the species. Agricultural cultivation and extensive road building throughout Laos and Vietnam have caused habitat loss and degradation, but hunting remains the primary threat. In 2018, the International Union for Conservation of Nature (IUCN) assessed the species as being endangered based on the high level of snaring activity in Vietnam, which is causing sharp declines in ground-dwelling small mammals in the region. Laos and Vietnam both have little historical basis for species conservation measures, but teams of law enforcement patrols led both by government and non-government forces have been successful in removing thousands of snares across the region's protected areas, including the conservation areas of Phong Nha – Kẻ Bàng National Park and Nakai-Nam Theun National Park in which it has been found.

A recommendation to the IUCN to evaluate the species was first made by Dang Can and colleagues in a 2001 Acta Theriologica article, but prior to 2018, two assessments by the IUCN in 2002 and 2008 were unable to determine a conservation status for the Annamite striped rabbit. These assessments marked the species as data deficient and noted a lack of available information, but considered that in Laos and Vietnam they would likely place the species as near threatened, vulnerable, or endangered. In 2024, the species' recovery was evaluated as "largely depleted" in a Green Status assessment, where it was noted that while the species is still present in many parts of its habitat, the small population in the species' southern distribution will likely be locally extinct within 10 years. However, anti-hunting interventions had a positive effect on Annamite striped rabbit populations, and the species' health could be further improved through habitat conservation and captive breeding programs. Capturing the species to establish a captive breeding colony has been described as simple compared to other, larger endangered species in the region, as Annamite striped rabbits surprised by a headlamp in the dark will freeze in position.
