= Sơn Kim =

Commune in Vietnam

Sơn Kim is a commune in Hương Sơn District, Hà Tĩnh Province, Vietnam. It is located at the border of Vietnam and Laos, on Road 8 which runs through Đức Thọ and Hương Sơn districts. It consists of about 7 villages scattered among hills and mountains of the Trường Sơn Range. The commune enjoys a source of mineral water.
