= Venezuelan lowland rabbit =

Conservation status
- Data Deficient (IUCN 3.1)

Scientific classification
- Kingdom: Animalia
- Phylum: Chordata
- Class: Mammalia
- Order: Lagomorpha
- Family: Leporidae
- Genus: Sylvilagus
- Species: S. varynaensis

Binomial name
- Sylvilagus varynaensis Durant & Guevara, 2001
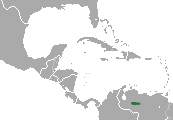
- Venezuelan lowland rabbit range

Species of mammal

The Venezuelan lowland rabbit (Sylvilagus varynaensis) (Spanish: conejo de monte), also known as the Barinas wild rabbit (Spanish: conejo de Barinas), is a species of cottontail rabbit found in western Venezuela. The largest of the rabbits within its limited distribution, it has buff- and reddish-colored fur and eats plants, mainly from the genera Sida and Malvastrum. It is closely related to the common tapeti, a smaller and more widely distributed cottontail rabbit.

The rabbit is prey to margays, crab-eating foxes, falcons, and owls, and is also a potential host to several roundworms and flatworms. It is classified as data deficient by the International Union for Conservation of Nature, as little is known about populations of the rabbit, and much of the material used to describe the species is held privately, inhibiting further research.

== Taxonomy ==
The first description of the Venezuelan lowland rabbit was produced in 2001 by Pedro Durant and Manuel Guevara. In their account, they noted that the new species had much larger body measurements from the regionally known common tapeti (Sylvilagus brasiliensis), and smaller tail lengths than any local population of eastern cottontail (S. floridanus). The holotype, a female specimen collected in 1989 from the type locality of "Fundo Millano", Sabaneta, Barinas, Venezuela, is kept at the University of the Andes in Mérida.

There are no subspecies of the Venezuelan lowland rabbit, and its closest relative is the common tapeti. It may have some genetic relationship to the eastern cottontail, but it is not included in several modern phylogenetic analyses. A 2017 review of rabbit systematics in northwestern South America recognized the species, but found no additional specimens and deferred to relationships proposed by Durant and Guevara in 2001, namely that the species is more closely related to S. brasiliensis than to S. floridanus based on it having only 3 pairs of teats and a small tail.

== Habitat and distribution ==
The Venezuelan lowland rabbit is found in low-elevation savannas close to dry forests within the Llanos ecoregion across Barinas, Portuguesa, and Guárico in western Venezuela. Its habitat is dominated by shrubby vegetation in the genera Sida and Malvastrum from the mallow family of plants, which provide shelter and food to the rabbit. Other plants found in this habitat are West Indian elm, yellow mombin, cecropia, fig, septicweed, petite flamboyant bauhinia, sensitive plant, lobster-claw, grasses, and sedges.

== Description ==
The Venezuelan lowland rabbit is the largest of the rabbits known from South America within its species distribution, which is shared at least partially with the common tapeti and the eastern cottontail. Adults have a head and body length of roughly 43 centimeters (17 in), tail length of 2.4 centimetres (0.94 in), hind foot length of 8.6 centimetres (3.4 in), and ear length of 6 cm (2.4 in). Females are larger than males and have three pairs of mammary glands. It has a tawny-colored nose, buff-colored cheek, above-eye, and external ear regions, and reddish fur on the back of the head to the bottom of the neck, with white-furred rings around the eyes.

The Venezuelan lowland rabbit's dental formula is 2.0.3.31.0.2.3 × 2 = 28—two pairs of upper and one pair of lower incisors, no canines, three upper and two lower premolars on each side, and three upper and lower molars on either side of the jaw. It differs from other cottontail rabbits found in Venezuela in several ways. Its length and weight is greater than both the common tapeti and eastern cottontail. The length of the Venezuelan lowland rabbit's palate is shorter than that of the eastern cottontail, but larger than that of the common tapeti. In their original description, Durant and Guevara differentiate the lowland rabbit from the common tapeti by its overall larger size and darker fur color.

== Behavior and ecology ==
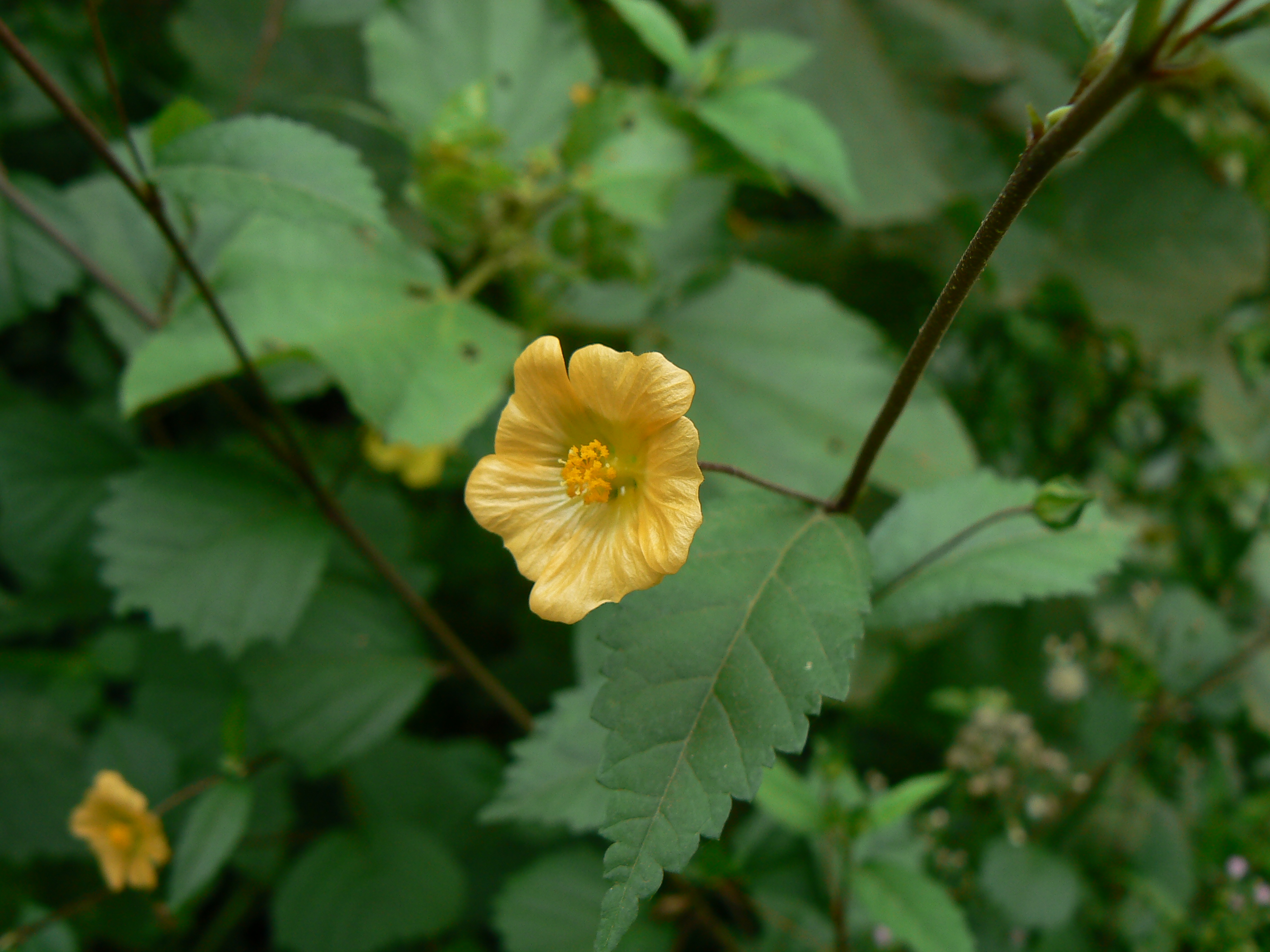
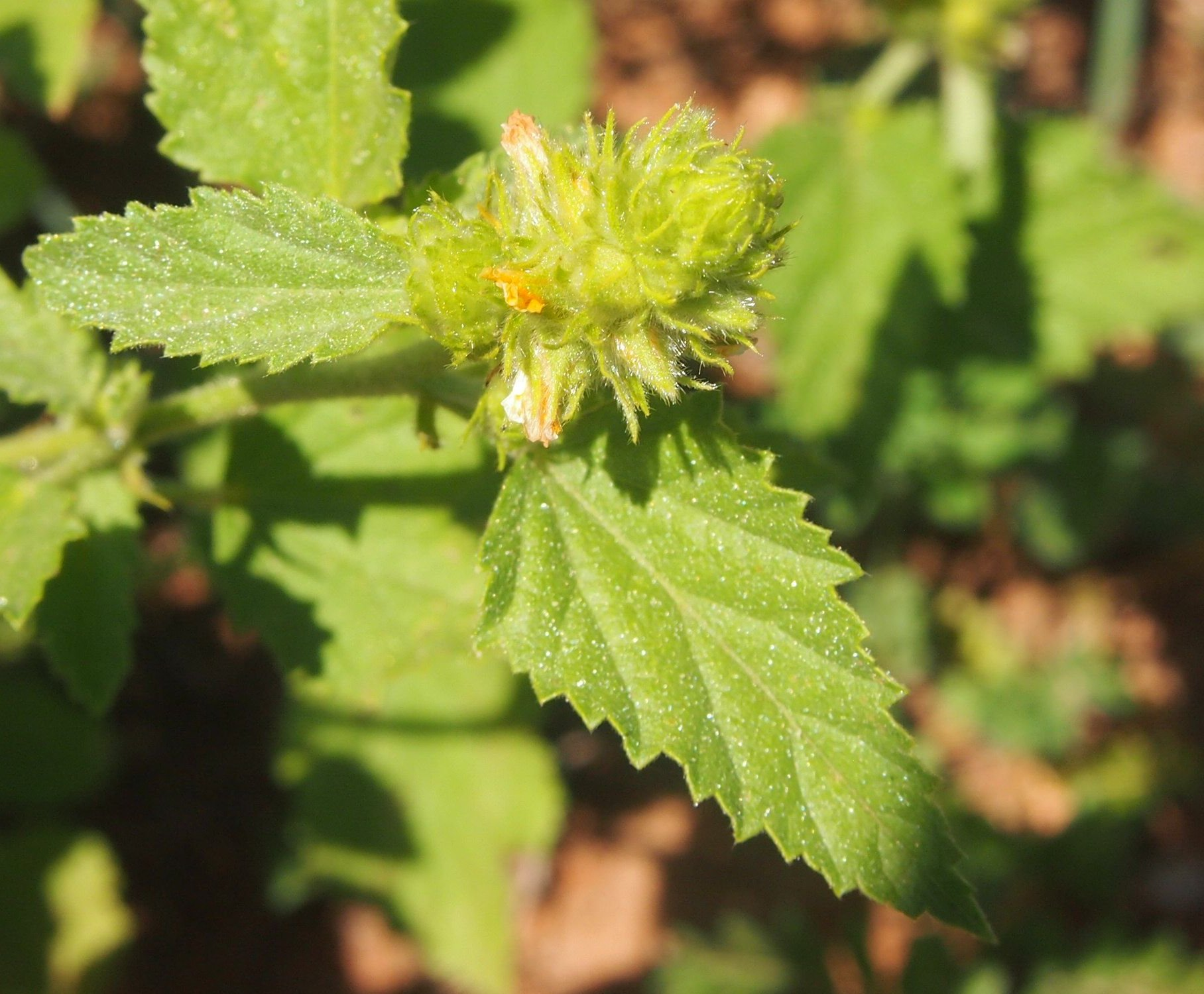
Mallow plants in the genera Sida and Malvastrum make up most of the Venezuelan lowland rabbit's diet.

Venezuelan lowland rabbits are herbivorous, and a large portion of their diet comes from plants in the genera Sida and Malvastrum. They engage in the process known as cecotrophy, like all lagomorphs (rabbits, hares, and pikas), in which food passes through the digestive tract twice. The rabbit will immediately consume moist pellets expelled from the anus without chewing and leave behind the dry pellets that are subsequently produced. This process is considered similar to the cud-chewing behavior of ruminants.

Reproduction takes place over three quarters of the year, with an average of 2.6 embryos per litter, but most commonly during September through December. The gestation period is 35 days. The females' larger size is attributed to its more sedentary nature, as they are more focused on building a nest and caring for their young. Males expend a great deal of energy trying to defend their territory and maintain their position in social hierarchy.

Several species prey upon the Venezuelan lowland rabbit, with the margay and crab-eating fox being the rabbit's main predators. Falcons and owls are also found throughout its distribution. Rabbits are also faced with competition for food from spiny rats. Predation is a factor in observed population declines during the rainy period from April to October. They are parasitized by adult and larval stages of roundworms, as well as flatworms in genus Taenia, but negative effects on the host rabbit have not been observed.

== Threats and conservation ==
Possible threats to the species include habitat destruction by deforestation and agricultural conversion, competition with grazing livestock and hunting.

The Venezuelan lowland rabbit is classified by the International Union for Conservation of Nature as data deficient under its Red List of Threatened Animals as of 2019. This same assessment was given in a 2008 account of the species. Authors Johnston and Smith note that not enough is known about the species' population dynamics and extent of occurrence to determine its status, and that all of the source material pertaining to the species has been removed to the private residence of Pedro Durant, who originally described the species, making it impossible to review further.
