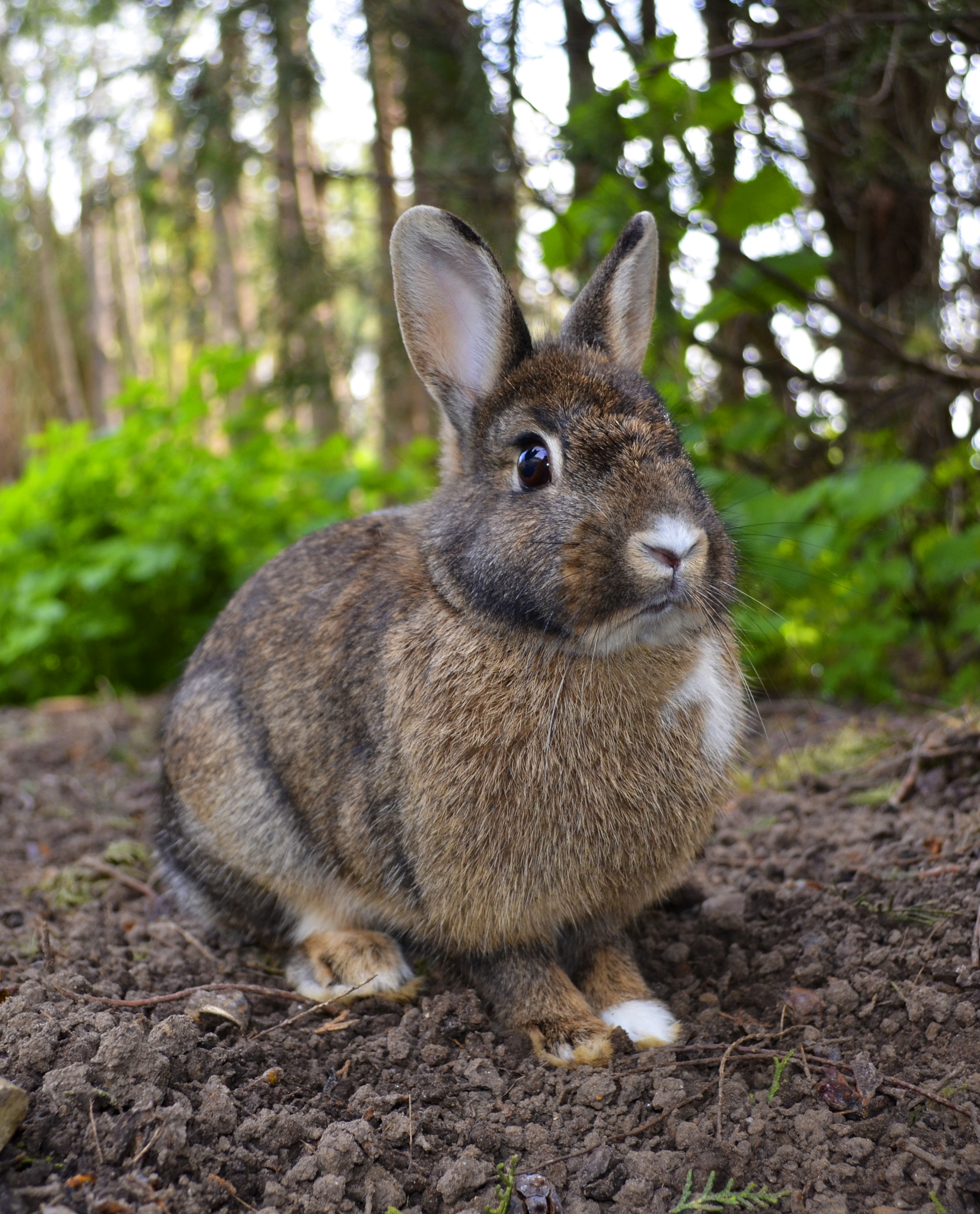
- European rabbit (Oryctolagus cuniculus)

Scientific classification
- Kingdom: Animalia
- Phylum: Chordata
- Class: Mammalia
- Order: Lagomorpha
- Family: Leporidae

Included genera
- Pentalagus; Bunolagus; Nesolagus; Romerolagus; Brachylagus; Sylvilagus; Oryctolagus; Poelagus; Caprolagus; Pronolagus

Cladistically included but traditionally excluded taxa
- Lepus

= Rabbit =

Rabbit Temporal range: Late Eocene – Holocene, 55–0 Ma

Mammals of the family Leporidae

Rabbits, or bunnies, are small mammals in the family Leporidae (which also includes the hares), which is in the order Lagomorpha (which also includes pikas). They are familiar throughout the world as a small herbivore, a prey animal, a domesticated form of livestock, and a pet, having a widespread effect on ecologies and cultures. The most widespread rabbit genera are Oryctolagus and Sylvilagus. The former, Oryctolagus, includes the European rabbit, Oryctolagus cuniculus, which is the ancestor of the hundreds of breeds of domestic rabbit and has been introduced on every continent except Antarctica. The latter, Sylvilagus, includes over 13 wild rabbit species, among them the cottontails and tapetis. Wild rabbits not included in Oryctolagus and Sylvilagus include several species of limited distribution, including the pygmy rabbit, volcano rabbit, and Sumatran striped rabbit.

Rabbits are a paraphyletic grouping, and do not constitute a clade, as hares (belonging to the genus Lepus) are nested within the Leporidae clade and are not described as rabbits. Although once considered rodents, lagomorphs diverged earlier and have a number of traits rodents lack, including two extra incisors. Similarities between rabbits and rodents were once attributed to convergent evolution, but studies in molecular biology have found a common ancestor between lagomorphs and rodents and place them in the clade Glires.

Rabbit physiology is suited to escaping predators and surviving in various habitats, living either alone or in groups in nests or burrows. As prey animals, rabbits are constantly aware of their surroundings, having a wide field of vision and ears with high surface area to detect potential predators. The ears of a rabbit are essential for thermoregulation and contain a high density of blood vessels. The bone structure of a rabbit's hind legs, which is longer than that of the fore legs, allows for quick hopping, which is beneficial for escaping predators and can provide powerful kicks if captured. Rabbits are typically nocturnal and often sleep with their eyes open. They reproduce quickly, having short pregnancies, large litters of four to twelve kits, and no particular mating season; however, the mortality rate of rabbit embryos is high, and there exist several widespread diseases that affect rabbits, such as rabbit hemorrhagic disease and myxomatosis. In some regions, especially Australia, rabbits have caused ecological problems and are regarded as a pest.

Humans have used rabbits as livestock since at least the first century BC in ancient Rome, raising them for their meat, fur and wool. The various breeds of the European rabbit have been developed to suit each of these products; the practice of raising and breeding rabbits as livestock is known as cuniculture. Rabbits are seen in human culture globally, appearing as a symbol of fertility, cunning, and innocence in major religions, historical and contemporary art.

== Terminology and etymology ==
The word rabbit derives from the Middle English rabet ("young of the coney"), a borrowing from the Walloon robète, which was a diminutive of the French or Middle Dutch robbe ("rabbit"), a term of unknown origin. The term coney is a term for an adult rabbit used until the 18th century; rabbit once referred only to the young animals. More recently, the term kit or kitten has been used to refer to a young rabbit. The endearing word bunny is attested by the 1680s as a diminutive of bun, a term used in Scotland to refer to rabbits and squirrels.

Coney is derived from cuniculus, a Latin term referring to rabbits which has been in use from at least the first century BC in Hispania. The word cuniculus may originate from a diminutive form of the word for "dog" in the Celtic languages.

A group of rabbits is known as a colony, nest, or warren, though the latter term more commonly refers to where the rabbits live. A group of baby rabbits produced from a single mating is referred to as a litter and a group of domestic rabbits living together is sometimes called a herd.

A male rabbit is called a buck, as are male goats and deer, derived from the Old English bucca or bucc, meaning "he-goat" or "male deer", respectively. A female is called a doe, derived from the Old English dā, related to dēon ("to suck").

== Taxonomy and evolution ==
Rabbits and hares were formerly classified in the order Rodentia (rodents) until 1912, when they were moved into the order Lagomorpha (which also includes pikas). Since 1945, there has been support for the clade Glires that includes both rodents and lagomorphs, though the two groups have always been closely associated in taxonomy; fossil, DNA, and retrotransposon studies in the 2000s have solidified support for the clade. Studies in paleontology and molecular biology suggest that rodents and lagomorphs diverged at the start of the Tertiary.

- - Nesolagus (striped rabbits)
  - - Poelagus (Bunyoro rabbit)
    - Pronolagus (red rock hares)
- - Romerolagus (volcano rabbit)
  - - - - - Sylvilagus (cottontails)
          - Brachylagus (pygmy rabbit)
        - - - Caprolagus (hispid hare)
            - Oryctolagus (European rabbit)
          - - Bunolagus (riverine rabbit)
            - Pentalagus (Amami rabbit)
    - Lepus (hares)

The extant species of family Leporidae, of which there are more than 70, are contained within 11 genera, one of which is Lepus, the hares. There are 32 extant species within Lepus. The cladogram is from Matthee et al., 2004, based on nuclear and mitochondrial gene analysis.

=== Classification ===
- Order Lagomorpha
  - Family Leporidae (in part):
- Genus Brachylagus
  - Pygmy rabbit, Brachylagus idahoensis
- Genus Bunolagus
  - Riverine rabbit, Bunolagus monticularis
- Genus Caprolagus
  - Hispid hare, Caprolagus hispidus
- Genus Lepus (Note: This genus is a hare, not a rabbit.)
- Genus Nesolagus
  - Sumatran striped rabbit, Nesolagus netscheri
  - Annamite striped rabbit, Nesolagus timminsi
- Genus Oryctolagus
  - European rabbit, Oryctolagus cuniculus
- Genus Pentalagus
  - Amami rabbit/Ryūkyū rabbit, Pentalagus furnessi
- Genus Poelagus
  - Bunyoro rabbit, Poelagus marjorita
- Genus Pronolagus
  - Natal red rock hare, Pronolagus crassicaudatus
  - Jameson's red rock hare, Pronolagus randensis
  - Smith's red rock hare, Pronolagus rupestris
  - Hewitt's red rock hare, Pronolagus saundersiae
- Genus Romerolagus
  - Volcano rabbit, Romerolagus diazi
- Genus Sylvilagus
  - Andean tapeti, Sylvilagus andinus
  - Swamp rabbit, Sylvilagus aquaticus
  - Desert cottontail, Sylvilagus audubonii
  - Brush rabbit, Sylvilagus bachmani
  - Common tapeti, Sylvilagus brasiliensis
  - Mexican cottontail, Sylvilagus cunicularis
  - Dice's cottontail, Sylvilagus dicei
  - Eastern cottontail, Sylvilagus floridanus
  - Central American tapeti, Sylvilagus gabbi
  - Tres Marias cottontail, Sylvilagus graysoni
  - Robust cottontail, Sylvilagus holzneri
  - Omilteme cottontail, Sylvilagus insonus
  - Mountain cottontail, Sylvilagus nuttallii
  - Appalachian cottontail, Sylvilagus obscurus
  - Marsh rabbit, Sylvilagus palustris
  - Santa Marta tapeti, Sylvilagus sanctaemartae
  - Coastal tapeti, Sylvilagus tapetillus
  - New England cottontail, Sylvilagus transitionalis
  - Venezuelan lowland rabbit, Sylvilagus varynaensis

=== Differences from hares ===
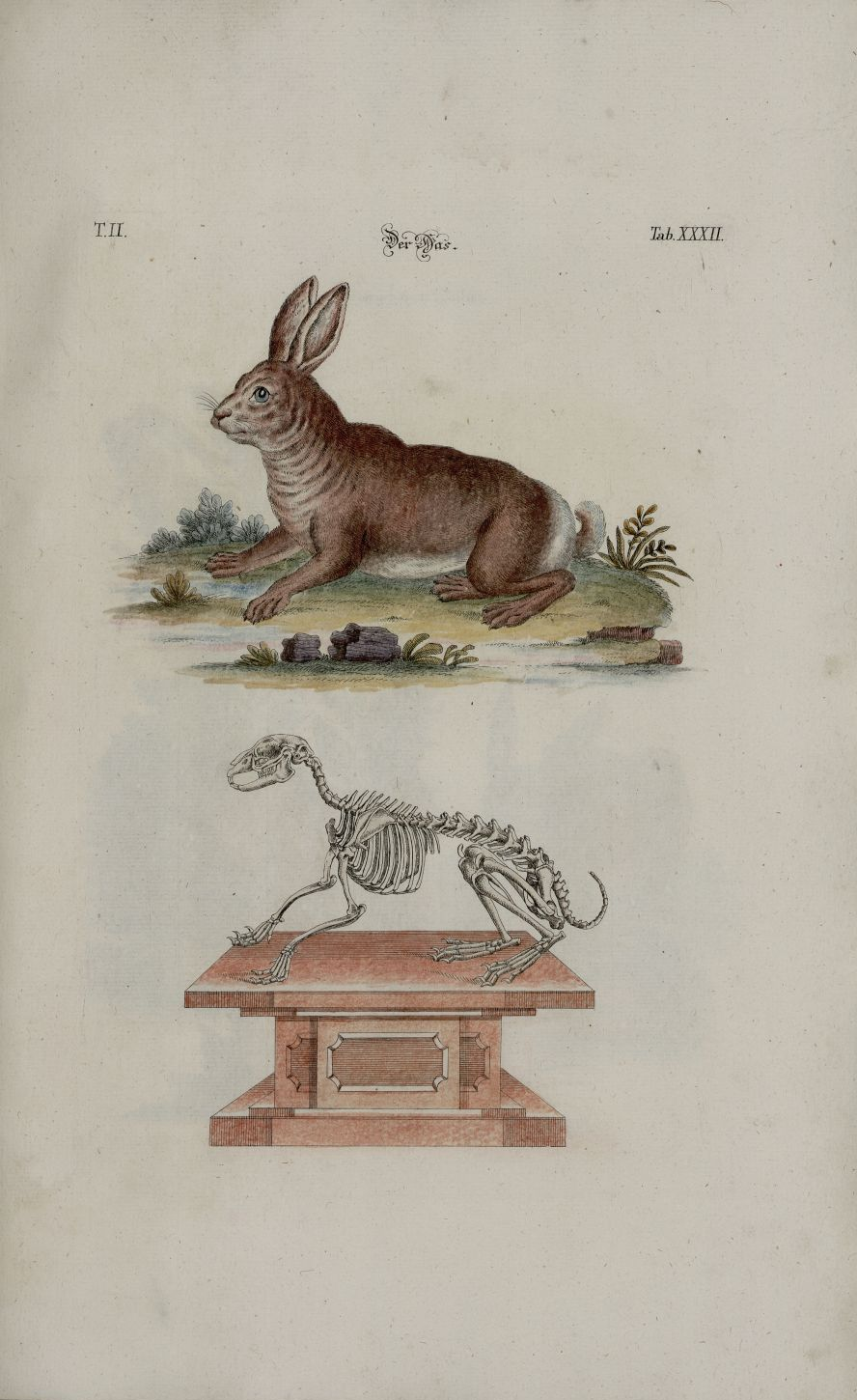
Hare
Johann Daniel Meyer (1748)

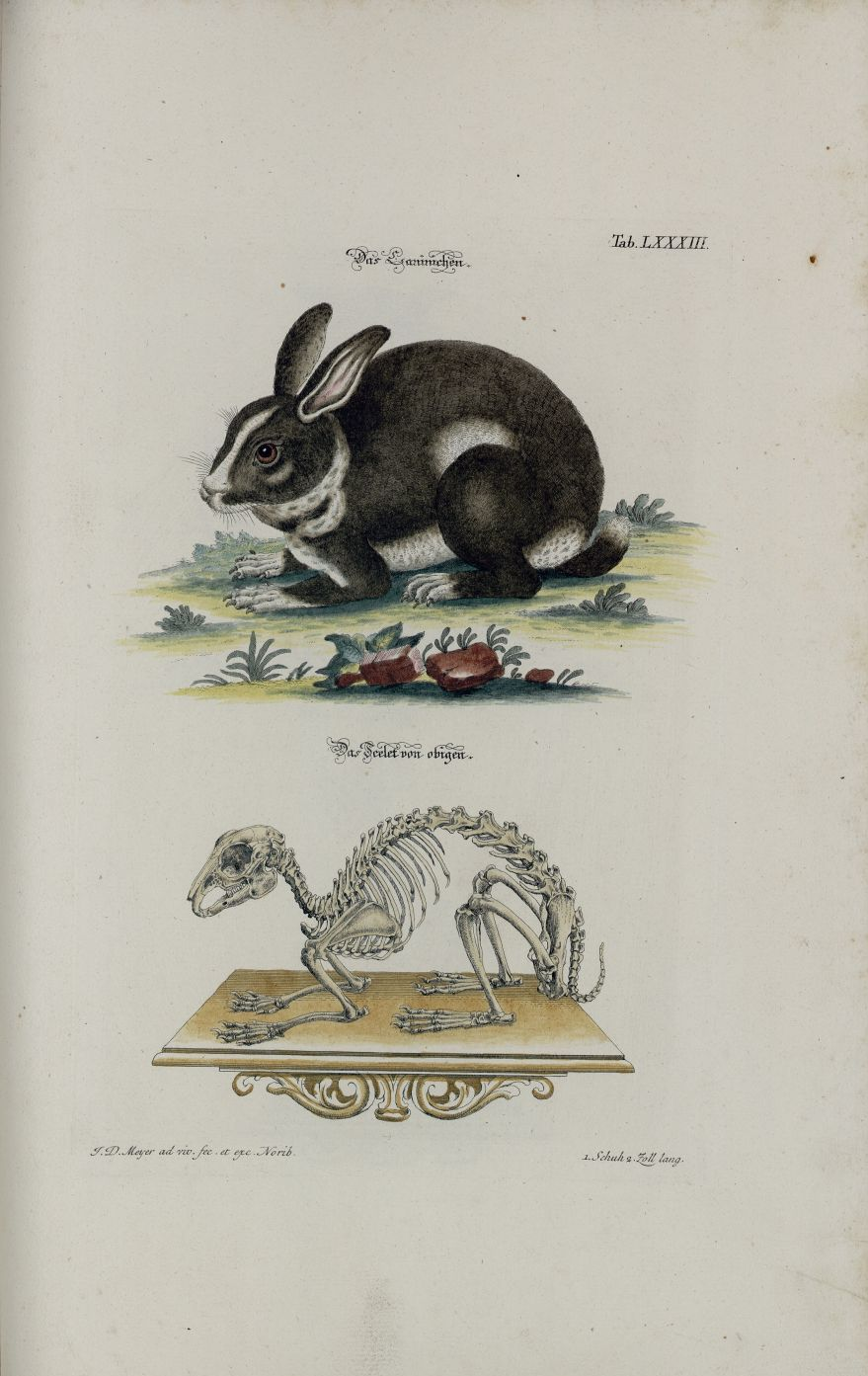
Rabbit
Johann Daniel Meyer (1748)

The term rabbit is typically used for all Leporidae species, excluding the genus Lepus. Members of that genus are known as hares or jackrabbits.

Lepus species are precocial, born relatively mature and mobile with hair and good vision out in the open air, while rabbit species are altricial, born hairless and blind in burrows and buried nests. Hares are also generally larger than rabbits, and have longer pregnancies. Hares and some rabbits live relatively solitary lives above the ground in open grassy areas, interacting mainly during breeding season. Some rabbit species group together to reduce their chance of being preyed upon, and the European rabbit will form large social groups in burrows, which are grouped together to form warrens. Burrowing by hares varies by location, and is more prominent in younger members of the genus; many rabbit species that do not dig their own burrows will use the burrows of other animals.

Rabbits and hares have historically not occupied the same locations, and only became sympatric relatively recently; historic accounts describe antagonistic relationships between rabbits and hares, specifically between the European hare and European or cottontail rabbits, but scientific literature since 1956 has found no evidence of aggression or undue competition between rabbits and hares. When they appear in the same habitat, rabbits and hares can co-exist on similar diets. Hares will notably force other hare species out of an area to control resources, but are not territorial. When faced with predators, hares will escape by outrunning them, whereas rabbits, being smaller and less able to reach the high speeds of longer-legged hares, will try to seek cover.

Descendants of the European rabbit are commonly bred as livestock and kept as pets, whereas no hares have been domesticated, though populations have been introduced to non-native habitats for use as a food source. The breed known as the Belgian hare is actually a domestic rabbit which has been selectively bred to resemble a hare, most likely from Flemish Giant stock originally. Common names of hare and rabbit species may also be confused; "jackrabbits" refer to hares, and the hispid hare is a rabbit.

=== Domestication ===
Rabbits, specifically the European rabbit (Oryctolagus cuniculus) species, have long been domesticated. The European rabbit has been widely kept as livestock, starting in ancient Rome from at least the first century BC. Selective breeding, which began in the Middle Ages, has generated a wide variety of rabbit breeds, of which many (since the early 19th century) are also kept as pets. Some strains of European rabbit have been bred specifically as research subjects, such as the New Zealand white.

As livestock, European rabbits are bred for their meat and fur. The earliest breeds were important sources of meat, and so were bred to be larger than wild rabbits at younger ages, but domestic rabbits in modern times range in size from dwarf to giant. Rabbit fur, produced as a byproduct of meat production but occasionally selected for as in the case of the Rex rabbit, can be found in a broad range of coat colors and patterns, some of which are produced via dyeing. Some breeds are raised for their wool, such as the Angora rabbit breeds; their fur is sheared, combed or plucked, and the fibers are spun into yarn.

== Biology ==
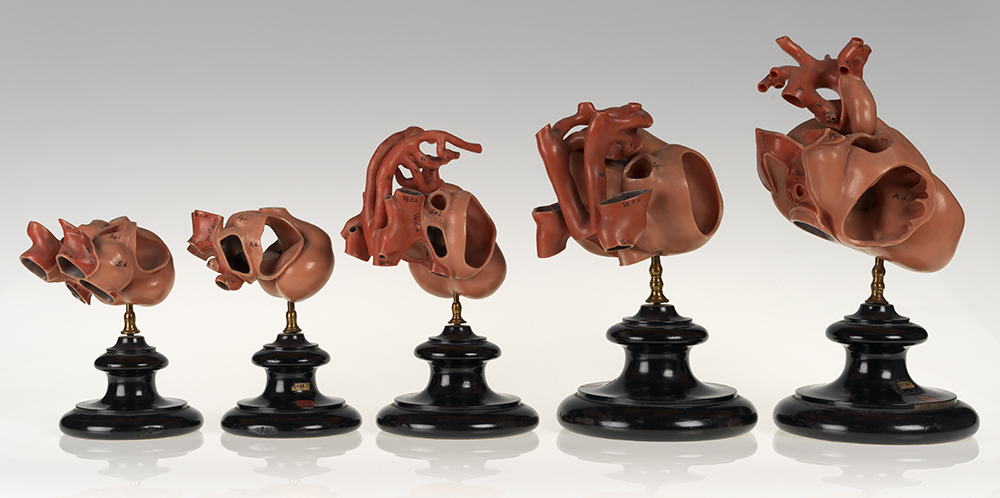
Wax models showing the development of the rabbit heart

=== Evolution ===
The earliest ancestor of rabbits and hares lived 55 million years ago in what is now Mongolia. Because the rabbit's epiglottis is engaged over the soft palate except when swallowing, the rabbit is an obligate nasal breather. As lagomorphs, rabbits have two sets of incisor teeth, one behind the other, a manner in which they differ from rodents, which only have one set of incisors. Another difference is that for rabbits, all of their teeth continue to grow, whereas for most rodents, only their incisors continue to grow. Carl Linnaeus originally grouped rabbits and rodents under the class Glires; later, they were separated as the scientific consensus is that many of their similarities were a result of convergent evolution. DNA analysis and the discovery of a common ancestor have supported the view that they share a common lineage, so rabbits and rodents are now often grouped together in the clade or superorder Glires.

=== Morphology ===
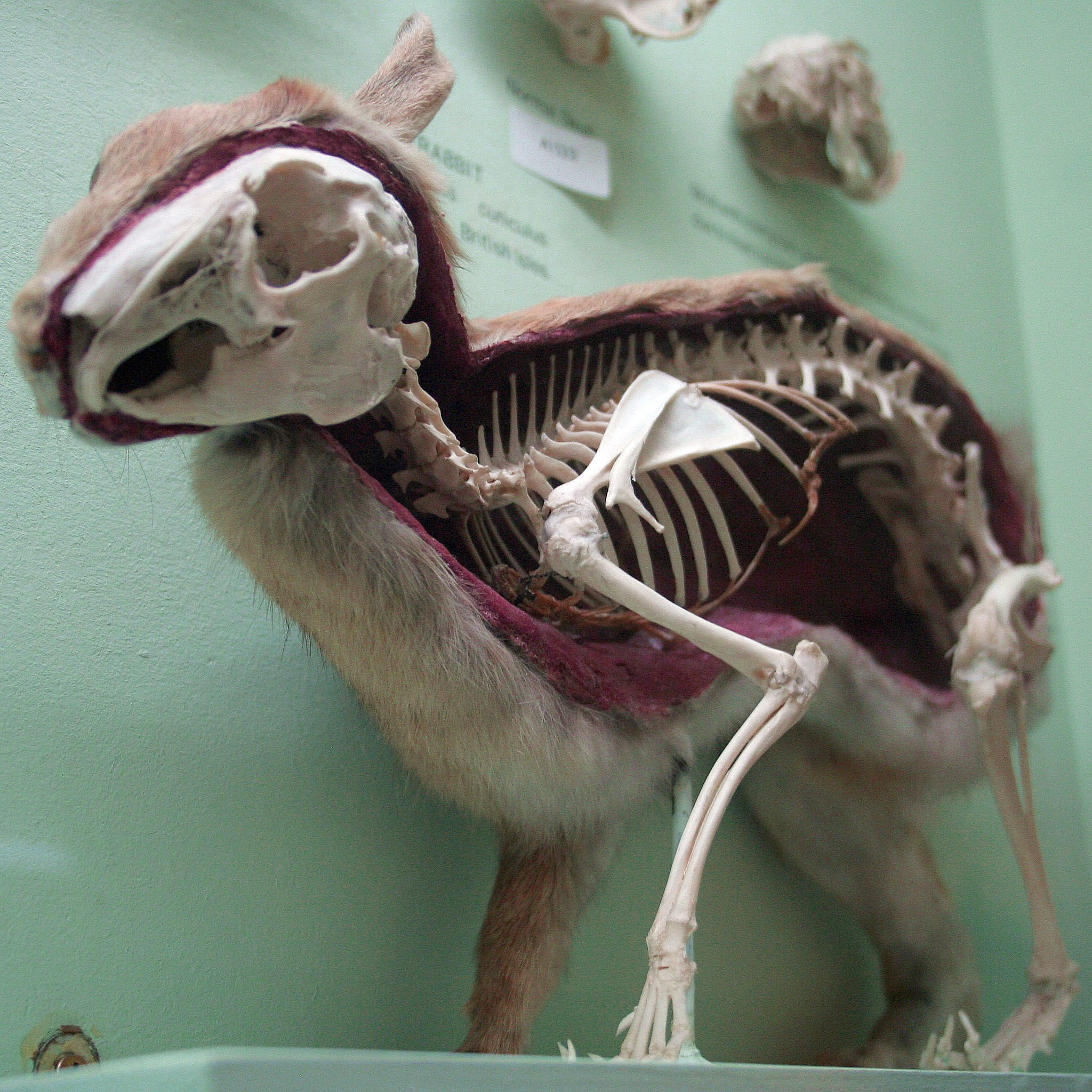
Skeleton of the rabbit

Since speed and agility are a rabbit's main defenses against predators, rabbits have large hind leg bones and well-developed musculature. Though plantigrade at rest, rabbits are on their toes while running, assuming a more digitigrade posture. Rabbits use their strong claws for digging and (along with their teeth) for defense. Each front foot has four toes plus a dewclaw. Each hind foot has four toes (but no dewclaw).

Most wild rabbits (especially compared to hares) have relatively full, egg-shaped bodies. The soft coat of the wild rabbit is agouti in coloration (or, rarely, melanistic), which aids in camouflage. The tail of the rabbit (with the exception of the cottontail species) is dark on top and white below. Cottontails have white on the top of their tails.

As a result of the position of the eyes in its skull and the size of the cornea, the rabbit has a panoramic field of vision that encompasses nearly 360 degrees. However, there is a blind spot at the bridge of the nose, and because of this, rabbits cannot see what is below their mouth and rely on their lips and whiskers to determine what they are eating. Blinking occurs 2 to 4 times an hour.

=== Hind limb elements ===
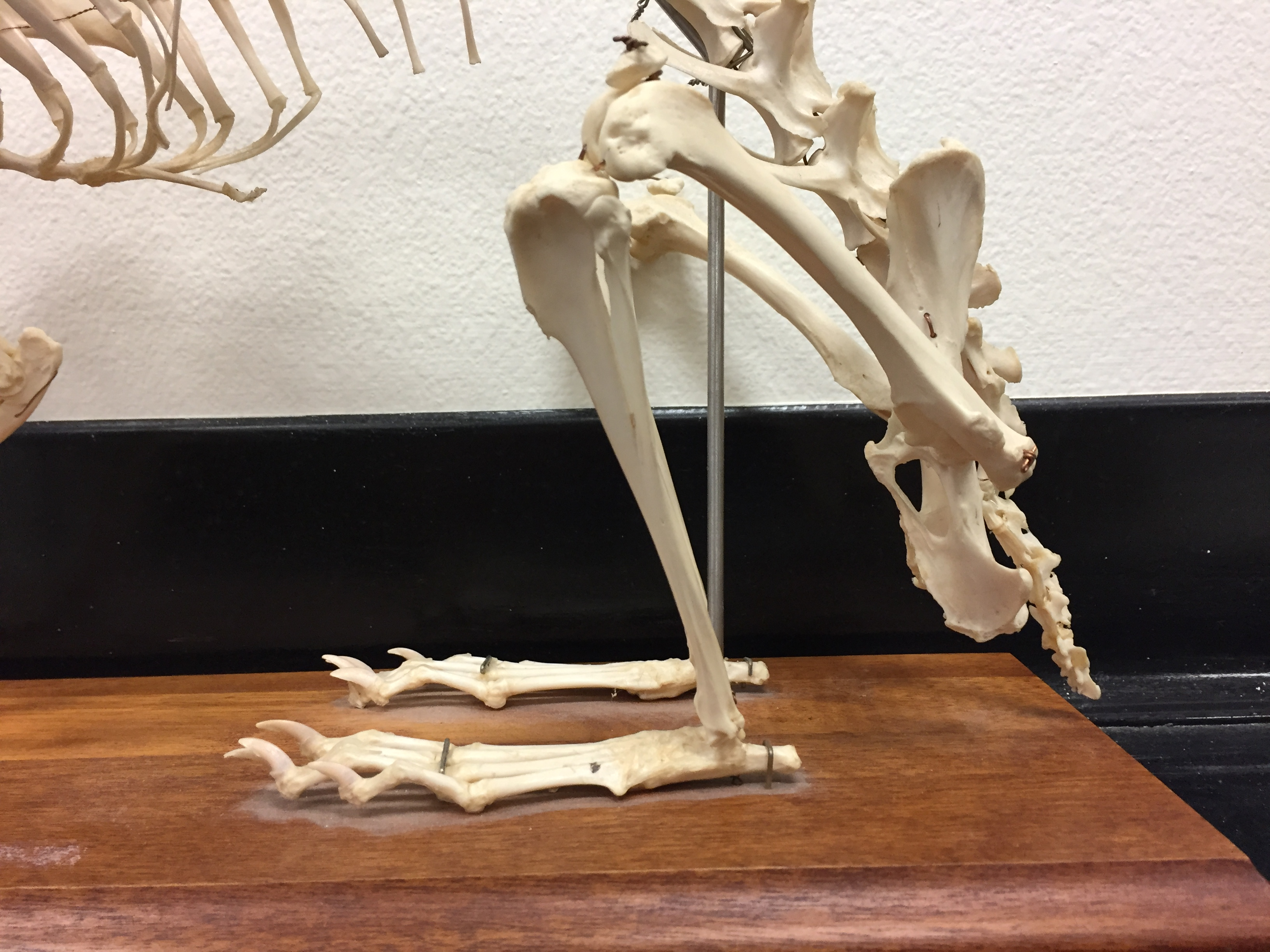
A specimen of the skeletal articulations of rabbit's hind limbs in the Pacific Lutheran University natural history collection

The anatomy of rabbits' hind limbs is structurally similar to that of other land mammals and contributes to their specialized form of locomotion. The bones of the hind limbs consist of long bones (the femur, tibia, fibula, and phalanges) as well as short bones (the tarsals). These bones are created through endochondral ossification during fetal development. Like most land mammals, the round head of the femur articulates with the acetabulum of the os coxae, the hip bone. The femur articulates with the tibia, but not the fibula, which is fused to the tibia. The tibia and fibula articulate with the tarsals of the pes, commonly called the foot. The hind limbs of the rabbit are longer than the front limbs. This allows them to produce their hopping form of locomotion. Longer hind limbs are more capable of producing faster speeds. Hares, which have longer legs than cottontail rabbits, are able to move considerably faster. The hind feet have four long toes that allow for digitigrade movement, which are webbed to prevent them from spreading when hopping. Rabbits do not have paw pads on their feet like most other animals that use digitigrade locomotion. Instead, they have coarse, compressed hair that offers protection.

==== Musculature ====
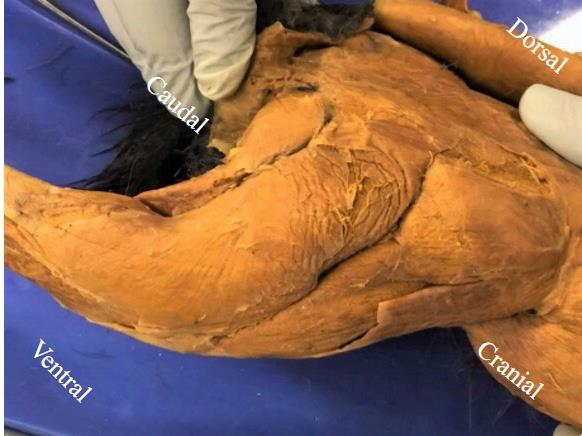
The rabbit's hind limb (lateral view) includes muscles involved in the quadriceps and hamstrings.

Rabbits have muscled hind legs that allow for maximum force, maneuverability, and acceleration that is divided into three main parts: foot, thigh, and leg. The hind limbs of a rabbit are an exaggerated feature. They are much longer and can provide more force than the forelimbs, which are structured like brakes to take the brunt of the landing after a leap. The force put out by the hind limbs is contributed by both the structural anatomy of the fusion of the tibia and fibula, and by the muscular features.

Bone formation and removal, from a cellular standpoint, is directly correlated to hind limb muscles. Action pressure from muscles creates force that is then distributed through the skeletal structures. Rabbits that generate less force, putting less stress on bones are more prone to osteoporosis due to bone rarefaction. In rabbits, the more fibers in a muscle, the more resistant to fatigue. For example, hares have a greater resistance to fatigue than cottontails. The muscles of rabbit's hind limbs can be classified into four main categories: hamstrings, quadriceps, dorsiflexors, or plantar flexors. The quadriceps muscles are in charge of force production when jumping. Complementing these muscles are the hamstrings, which aid in short bursts of action. These muscles play off of one another in the same way as the plantar flexors and dorsiflexors, contributing to the generation and actions associated with force.

=== Ears ===
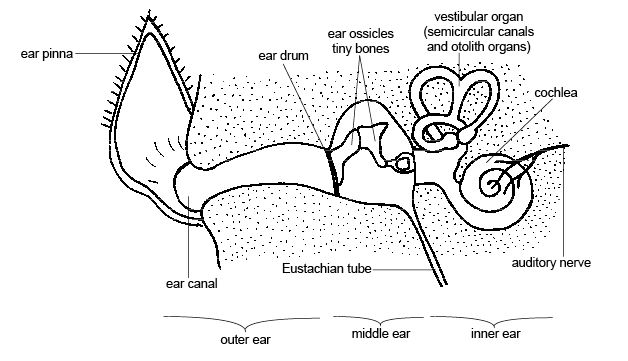
Anatomy of mammalian ear

Within the order of lagomorphs, the ears are used to detect and avoid predators. In the family Leporidae, the ears are typically longer than they are wide, and are in general relatively long compared to other mammals.

According to Allen's rule, endothermic animals adapted to colder climates have shorter, thicker limbs and appendages than those of similar animals adapted to warm climates. The rule was originally derived by comparing the ear lengths of Lepus species across the various climates of North America. Subsequent studies show that this rule remains true in the Leporidae for the ears specifically, in that the surface area of rabbits' and hares' ears are enlarged in warm climates; the ears are an important structure to aid thermoregulation as well as in detecting predators due to the way the outer, middle, and inner ear muscles coordinate with one another. The ear muscles also aid in maintaining balance and movement when fleeing predators.

The auricle, also known as the pinna, is a rabbit's outer ear. The rabbit's pinnae represent a fair part of the body surface area. It is theorized that the ears aid in dispersion of heat at temperatures above 30 °C (86 °F), with rabbits in warmer climates having longer pinnae due to this. Another theory is that the ears function as shock absorbers that could aid and stabilize rabbits' vision when fleeing predators, but this has typically only been seen in hares. The rest of the outer ear has bent canals that lead to the eardrum or tympanic membrane.

The middle ear, separated by the outer eardrum in the back of the rabbit's skull, contains three bones: the hammer, anvil, and stirrup, collectively called ossicles, which act to decrease sound before it hits the inner ear; in general, the ossicles act as a barrier to the inner ear for sound energy.

Inner ear fluid, called endolymph, receives the sound energy. After receiving the energy. The inner ear comprises two parts: the cochlea that uses sound waves from the ossicles, and the vestibular apparatus that manages the rabbit's position in regard to movement. Within the cochlea a basilar membrane contains sensory hair structures that send nerve signals to the brain, allowing it to recognize different sound frequencies. Within the vestibular apparatus three semicircular canals help detect angular motion.

==== Thermoregulation ====
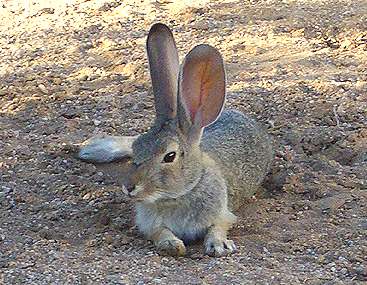
The blood flow through the rabbit's ears helps with thermoregulation, as seen in this desert cottontail.

The pinnae, which contain a vascular network and arteriovenous shunts, aid in thermoregulation. In a rabbit, the optimal body temperature is around 38.5–40.0 °C (101.3–104.0 °F). If their body temperature exceeds or does not meet this optimal temperature, the rabbit must make efforts to return to homeostasis. Homeostasis of body temperature is maintained by changing the amount of blood flow that passes through the highly vascularized ears, as rabbits have few to no sweat glands. Rabbits may also regulate their temperature by resting in depressions in the ground, known as forms.

=== Respiratory system ===
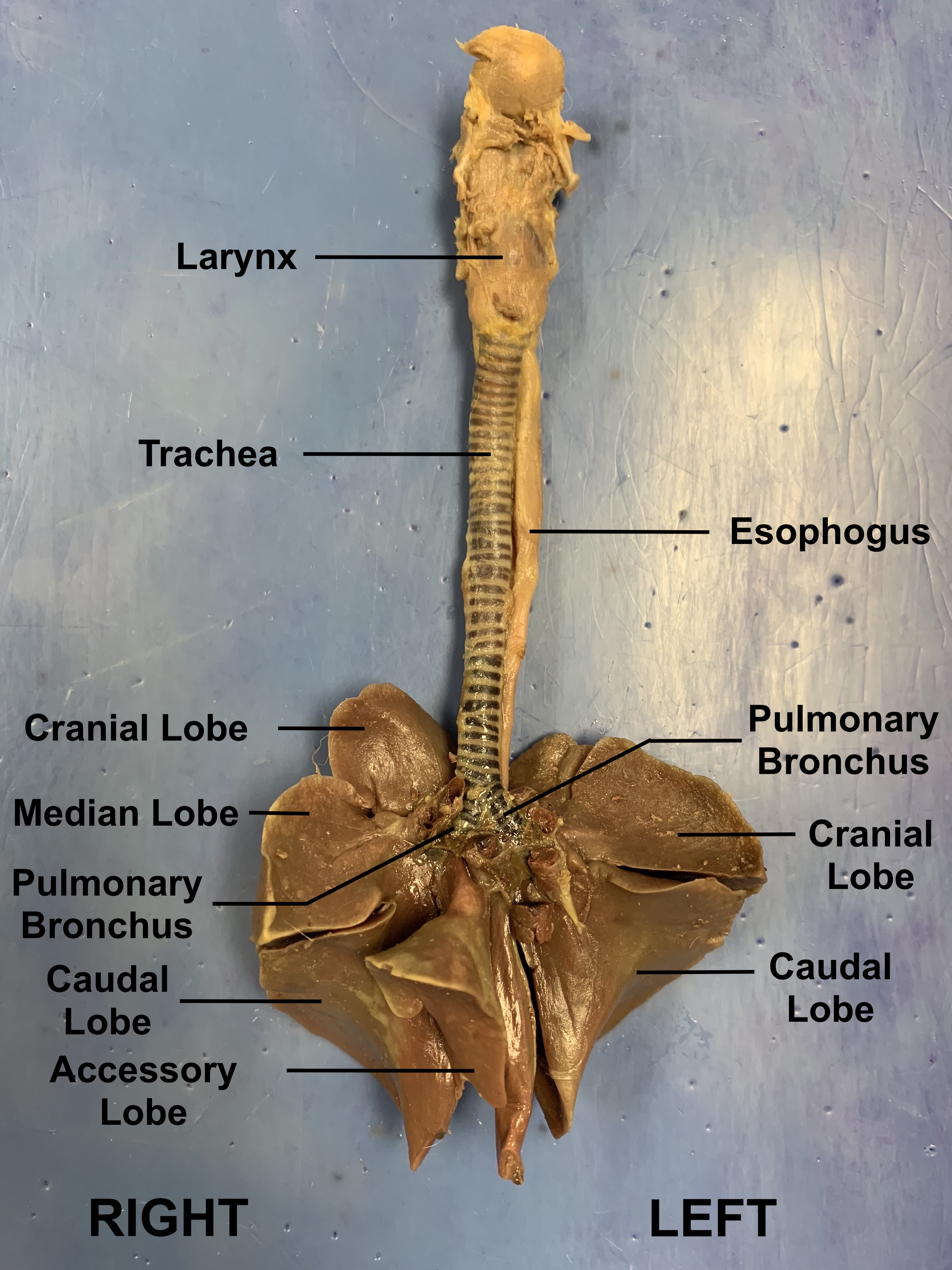
Ventral view of dissected rabbit lungs with key structures labeled

The rabbit's nasal cavity lies dorsal to the oral cavity, and the two compartments are separated by the hard and soft palate. The nasal cavity itself is separated into a left and right side by a cartilage barrier, and it is covered in fine hairs that trap dust before it can enter the respiratory tract. As the rabbit breathes, air flows in through the nostrils along the alar folds. From there, the air moves into the nasal cavity, also known as the nasopharynx, down through the trachea, through the larynx, and into the lungs. The larynx functions as the rabbit's voice box, which enables it to produce a wide variety of sounds. The trachea is a long tube embedded with cartilaginous rings that prevent the tube from collapsing as air moves in and out of the lungs. The trachea then splits into a left and right bronchus, which meet the lungs at a structure called the hilum. From there, the bronchi split into progressively more narrow and numerous branches. The bronchi branch into bronchioles, into respiratory bronchioles, and ultimately terminate at the alveolar ducts. The branching that is typically found in rabbit lungs is a clear example of monopodial branching, in which smaller branches divide out laterally from a larger central branch.

The structure of the rabbit's nasal and oral cavities necessitates breathing through the nose. This is due to the fact that the epiglottis is fixed to the backmost portion of the soft palate. Within the oral cavity, a layer of tissue sits over the opening of the glottis, which blocks airflow from the oral cavity to the trachea. The epiglottis functions to prevent the rabbit from aspirating on its food. Furthermore, the presence of a soft and hard palate allows the rabbit to breathe through its nose while it feeds.

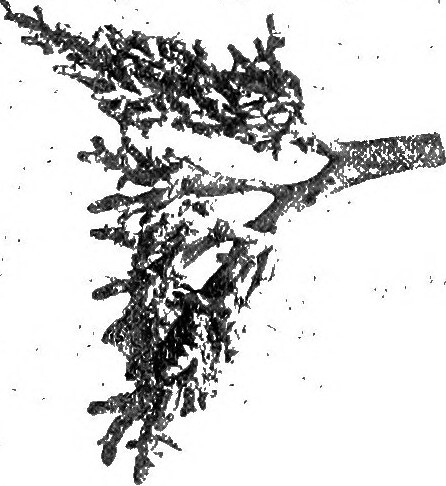
Monopodial branching as seen in dissected rabbit lungs

Rabbits' lungs are divided into four lobes: the cranial, middle, caudal, and accessory lobes. The right lung is made up of all four lobes, while the left lung only has two: the cranial and caudal lobes. To provide space for the heart, the left cranial lobe of the lungs is significantly smaller than that of the right. The diaphragm is a muscular structure that lies caudal to the lungs and contracts to facilitate respiration.

=== Diet and digestion ===
Rabbits are strict herbivores and are suited to a diet high in fiber, mostly in the form of cellulose. They will typically graze grass upon waking up and emerging from a burrow, and will move on to consume vegetation and other plants throughout the waking period; rabbits have been known to eat a wide variety of plants, including tree leaves and fruits, though consumption of fruit and lower fiber foods is common for pet rabbits where natural vegetation is scarce.

Easily digestible food is processed in the gastrointestinal tract and expelled as regular feces. To get nutrients out of hard to digest fiber, rabbits ferment fiber in the cecum (part of the gastrointestinal tract) and then expel the contents as cecotropes, which are reingested (cecotrophy or refection). The cecotropes are then absorbed in the small intestine to use the nutrients. Soft cecotropes are usually consumed during periods of rest in underground burrows.

Rabbits cannot vomit; and therefore if buildup occurs within the intestines (due often to a diet with insufficient fibre), intestinal blockage can occur.

=== Reproduction ===
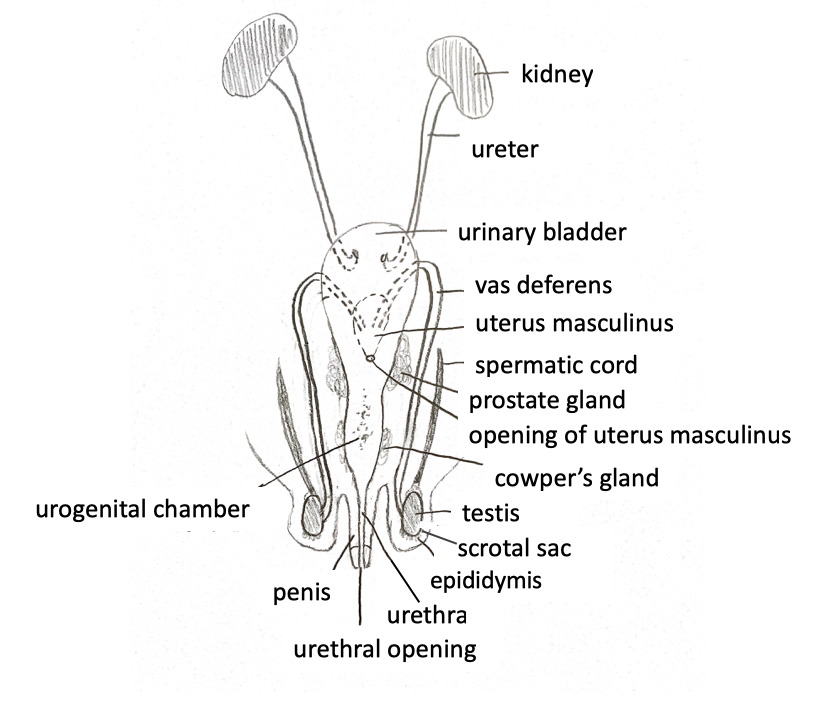
Diagram of the male rabbit reproductive system with main components labeled

The adult male reproductive system forms the same as most mammals with the seminiferous tubular compartment containing the Sertoli cells and an adluminal compartment that contains the Leydig cells. The Leydig cells produce testosterone, which maintains libido and creates secondary sex characteristics such as the genital tubercle and penis. The Sertoli cells triggers the production of Anti-Müllerian duct hormone, which absorbs the Müllerian duct. In an adult male rabbit, the sheath of the penis is cylinder-like and can be extruded as early as two months of age. The scrotal sacs lay lateral to the penis and contain epididymal fat pads which protect the testes. Between 10 and 14 weeks, the testes descend and are able to retract into the pelvic cavity to thermoregulate. Furthermore, the secondary sex characteristics, such as the testes, are complex and secrete many compounds. These compounds include fructose, citric acid, minerals, and a uniquely high amount of catalase, all of which affect the characteristics of rabbit semen; for instance, citric acid is positively correlated with agglutination, and high amounts of catalase protect against premature capacitation.

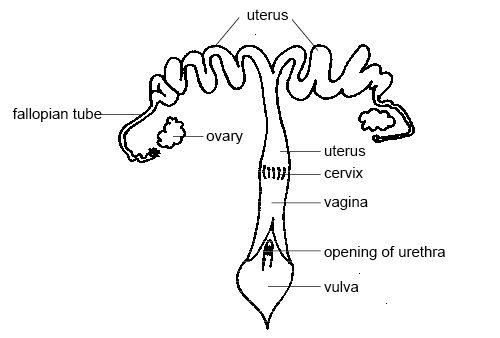
Diagram of the female rabbit reproductive system with main components labeled

The adult female reproductive tract is bipartite, which prevents an embryo from translocating between uteri. The female urethra and vagina open into a urogenital sinus with a single urogenital opening. The two uterine horns communicate to two cervixes and forms one vaginal canal. Along with being bipartite, the female rabbit does not go through an estrus cycle, which causes mating induced ovulation.

The average female rabbit becomes sexually mature at three to eight months of age and can conceive at any time of the year for the duration of her life. Egg and sperm production can begin to decline after three years, with some species such as those in genus Oryctolagus completely stopping reproduction at 6 years of age. During mating, the male rabbit will insert his penis into the female from behind, make rapid pelvic thrusts until ejaculation, and throw himself backward off the female. Copulation lasts only 20–40 seconds.

The rabbit gestation period is short and ranges from 27 to 30 days. A longer gestation period will generally yield a smaller litter while shorter gestation periods will give birth to a larger litter. The size of a single litter can range from 1 to 12 kits, depending on species. After birth, the only role of males is to protect the young from other rabbits, and the mother will leave the young in the nest most of the day, returning to nurse them once every 24 hours. The female can become pregnant again as early as the next day.

After mating, the doe will begin to dig a burrow or prepare a nest before giving birth. Between three days and a few hours before giving birth another series of hormonal changes will cause her to prepare the nest structure. The doe will first gather grass for a structure, and an elevation in prolactin shortly before birth will cause her fur to shed that the doe will then use to line the nest, providing insulation for the newborn kits.

The mortality rates of embryos are high in rabbits and can be due to infection, trauma, poor nutrition and environmental stress. A high fertility rate is necessary to counter this. More than half of rabbit pregnancies are aborted, causing embryos to be resorbed into the mother's body; vitamin deficiencies are a major cause of abortions in domestic rabbits.

=== Sleep ===
Rabbits may appear to be crepuscular, but many species are naturally inclined towards nocturnal activity. In 2011, the average sleep time of a rabbit in captivity was calculated at 8.4 hours per day; previous studies have estimated sleep periods as long as 11.4 hours on average, undergoing both slow-wave and rapid eye movement sleep. Newborn rabbits will sleep for 22 hours a day before leaving the nest. As with other prey animals, rabbits often sleep with their eyes open, so that sudden movements will awaken the rabbit to respond to potential danger.

=== Diseases and immunity ===
In addition to being at risk of disease from common pathogens such as Bordetella bronchiseptica and Escherichia coli, rabbits can contract the virulent, species-specific viruses myxomatosis, and a form of calicivirus which causes rabbit hemorrhagic disease. Myxomatosis is more hazardous to pet rabbits, as wild rabbits often have some immunity. Among the parasites that infect rabbits are tapeworms (such as Taenia serialis), external parasites (including fleas and mites), coccidia species, Encephalitozoon cuniculi, and Toxoplasma gondii. Domesticated rabbits with a diet lacking in high-fiber sources, such as hay and grass, are susceptible to potentially lethal gastrointestinal stasis. Rabbits and hares are almost never found to be infected with rabies and have not been known to transmit rabies to humans.

Rabbit hemorrhagic disease (RHD) is a highly infectious rabbit-specific disease caused by strains of rabbit hemorrhagic disease virus (RHDV), including type 2 (RHDV2). The disease was first described in domestic Angora rabbits imported from Germany to Jiangsu, China in 1984, and quickly spread to Korea, Italy, and the rest of Europe. The disease spread to the Americas from 1988, first appearing in rabbits imported to Mexico, but subsequent outbreaks were infrequent, as RHDV only affected the European rabbit species. RHDV2, a strain of RHD-causing virus that affects both domestic and wild lagomorphs, such as hares, was detected for the first time in France in 2010. RHDV2 has since spread to the rest of Europe, Canada, Australia, and the United States.

== Ecology ==
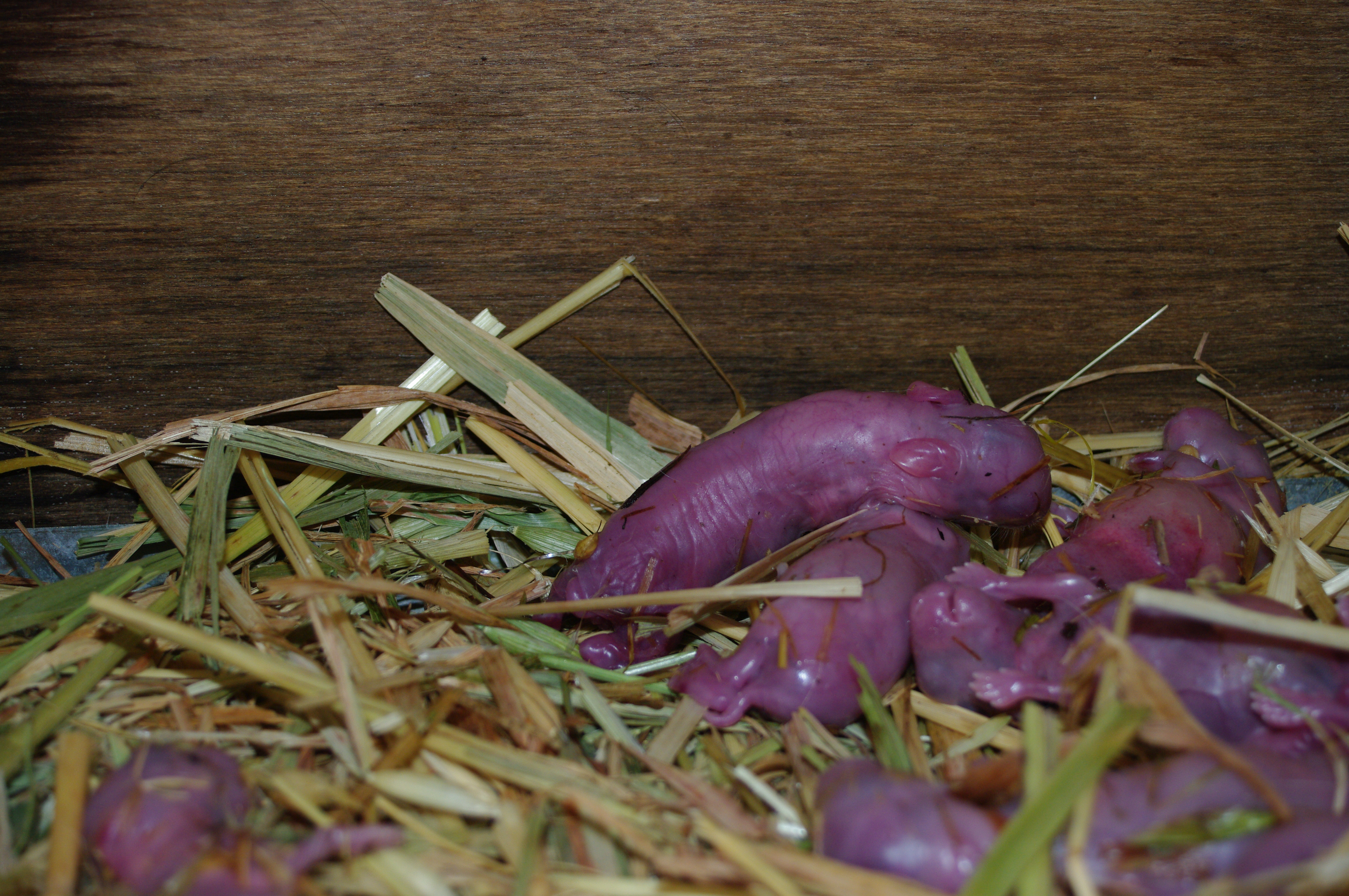
Rabbit kits one hour after birth

Rabbits are prey animals. In Mediterranean Europe, for example, rabbits are the main prey of red foxes, badgers, and Iberian lynxes. To avoid predation and to navigate underground, rabbits have heightened senses (compared to humans) and are constantly aware of their surroundings. If confronted by a potential threat, a rabbit may freeze and observe, then warn others in the warren with powerful thumps on the ground from a hind foot. Rabbits have a remarkably wide field of vision, and a good deal of it is devoted to overhead scanning. A rabbit eye has no fovea, but a "visual streak", a horizontal line in the middle of the retina where both rod and cone cell densities are the highest. This allows them to scan the horizon with little head turning.

Rabbits survive predation by burrowing (in some species), and hopping away to dense cover. Their strong teeth allow them to bite to escape a struggle.

The longest-lived rabbit on record, a domesticated European rabbit living in Tasmania, died at age 18. The lifespan of wild rabbits is much shorter; the average longevity of an eastern cottontail, for instance, is about one to five years. The various species of rabbit have been recorded as living from four to 13 years in captivity.

=== Habitat and range ===
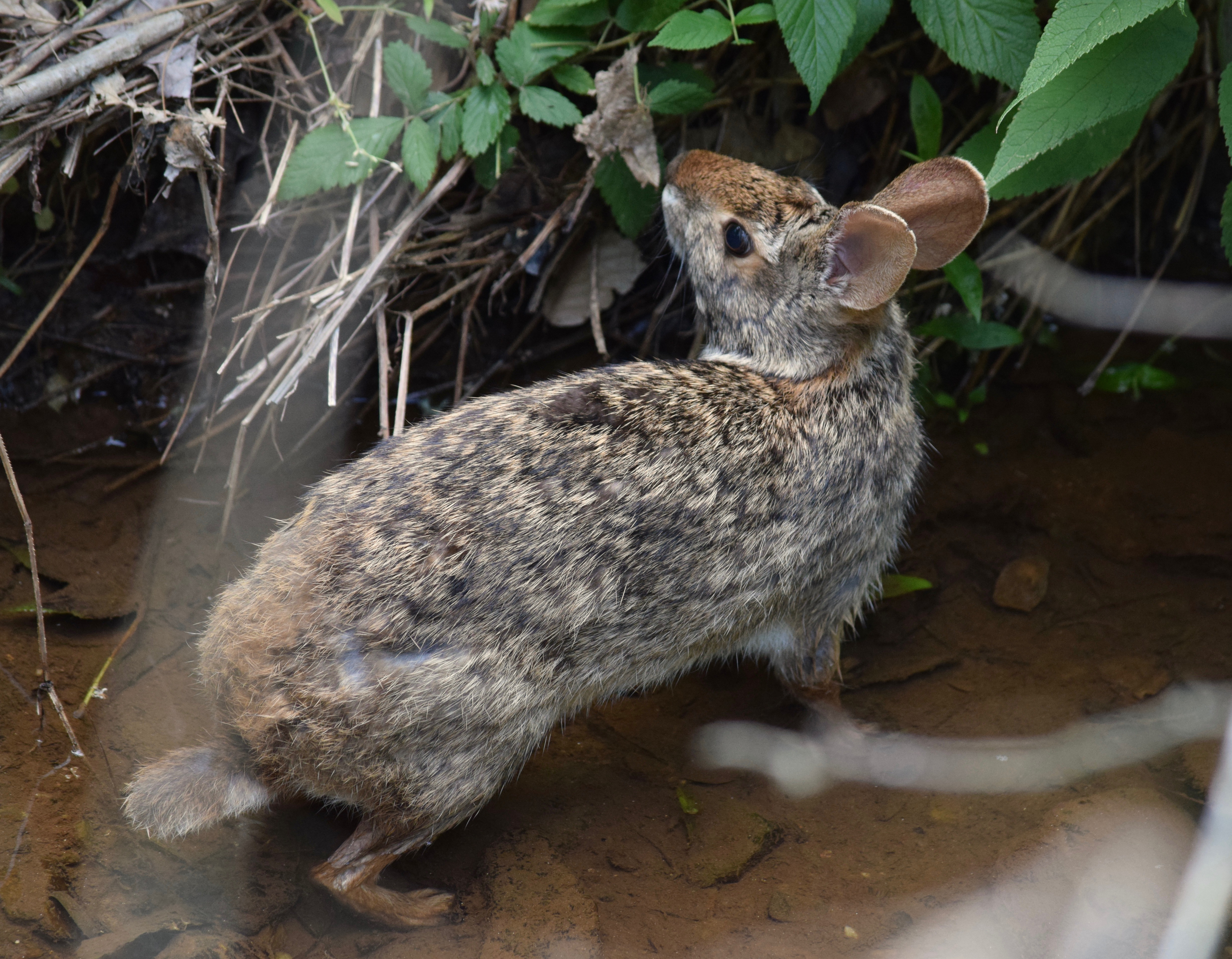
Sylvilagus aquaticus (swamp rabbit) in its natural habitat

Rabbit habitats include forests, steppes, plateaus, deserts, and swamps. Some species, such as the volcano rabbit (Romerolagus diazi) have especially limited distribution due to their habitat needs. Rabbits live in groups, or colonies, varying in behavior depending on species and often using the burrows of other animals or creating nests in holes. The European rabbit notably lives in extensive burrow networks called warrens.

Rabbits are native to North America, southwestern Europe, Southeast Asia, Sumatra, some islands of Japan, and parts of Africa and South America. They are not naturally found in most of Eurasia, where a number of species of hares are present. A 2003 study on domestic rabbits in China found that "(so-called) Chinese rabbits were introduced from Europe", and that "genetic diversity in Chinese rabbits was very low".

Rabbits first entered South America relatively recently, as part of the Great American Interchange. Much of the continent was considered to have just one species of rabbit, the tapeti, (Note: In addition to the common tapeti, several other species in genus Sylvilagus are known to inhabit South and Central America: the Andean tapeti, the Central American tapeti, the coastal tapeti, the Santa Marta tapeti, and the Venezuelan lowland rabbit.) and most of South America's Southern Cone has had no rabbits until the introduction of the European rabbit, which has been introduced to many places around the world, in the late 19th century.

Rabbits have been launched into space orbit.

=== Marking ===
Both sexes of rabbits often rub their chins on objects with their scent gland located under the chin. This is the rabbit's way of marking their territory or possessions for other rabbits to recognize by depositing scent gland secretions. Rabbits who have bonded will respect each other's smell, which indicates a territorial border. Rabbits also have scent glands that produce a strong-smelling waxy substance near their anuses. Territorial marking by scent glands has been documented among both domestic and wild rabbit species.

=== Environmental problems ===
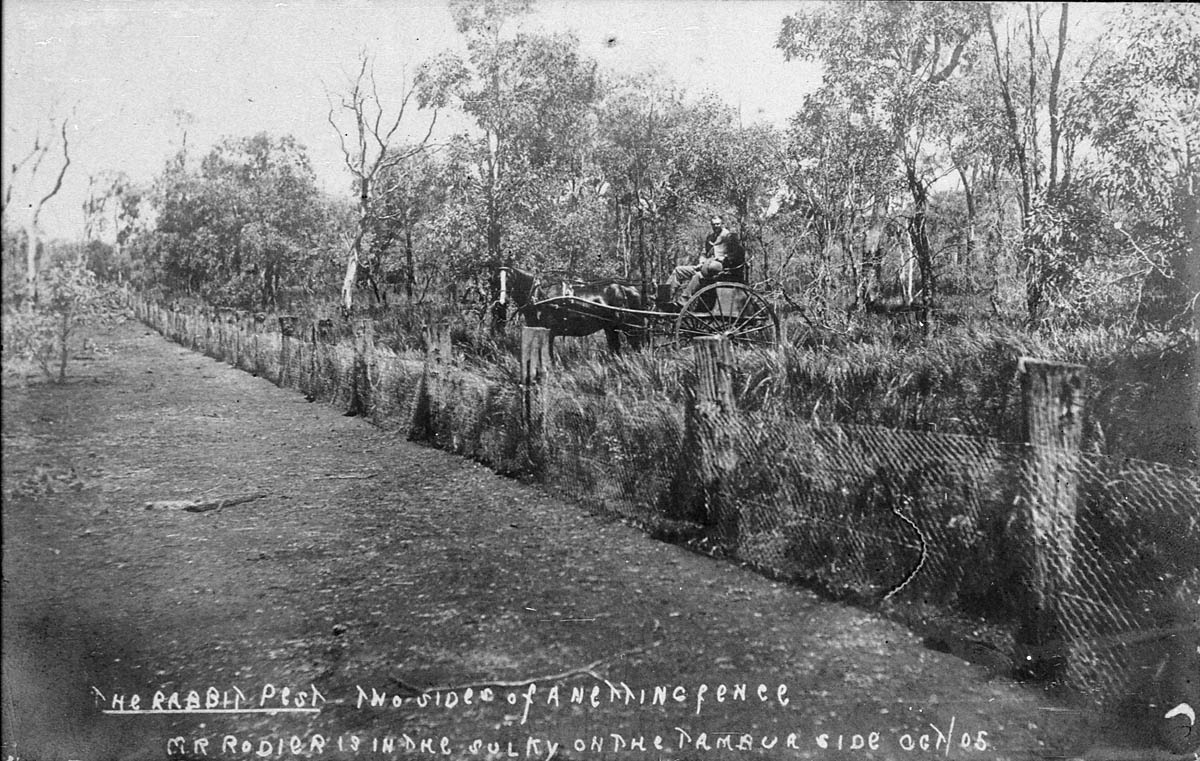
Impact of rabbit-proof fence, Cobar, New South Wales, 1905

Rabbits, particularly the European rabbit, have been a source of environmental problems when introduced into the wild by humans. As a result of their appetites, and the rate at which they breed, feral rabbit depredation can be problematic for agriculture. Gassing (fumigation of warrens), barriers (fences), shooting, snaring, and ferreting have been used to control rabbit populations, but the most effective measures are diseases such as myxomatosis and calicivirus. In Europe, where domestic rabbits are farmed on a large scale, they can be protected against myxomatosis and calicivirus via vaccination. Rabbits in Australia and New Zealand are considered to be such a pest that landowners are legally obliged to control them.

Rabbits are known to be able to catch fire and spread wildfires, particularly in Chile, where the European rabbit is an invasive species, but the efficiency and relevance of this mechanism has been doubted by forest experts who contend that a rabbit on fire could move some meters. Knowledge on fire-spreading rabbits is based on anecdotes as there is no known scientific investigation on the subject.

== Food and clothing ==
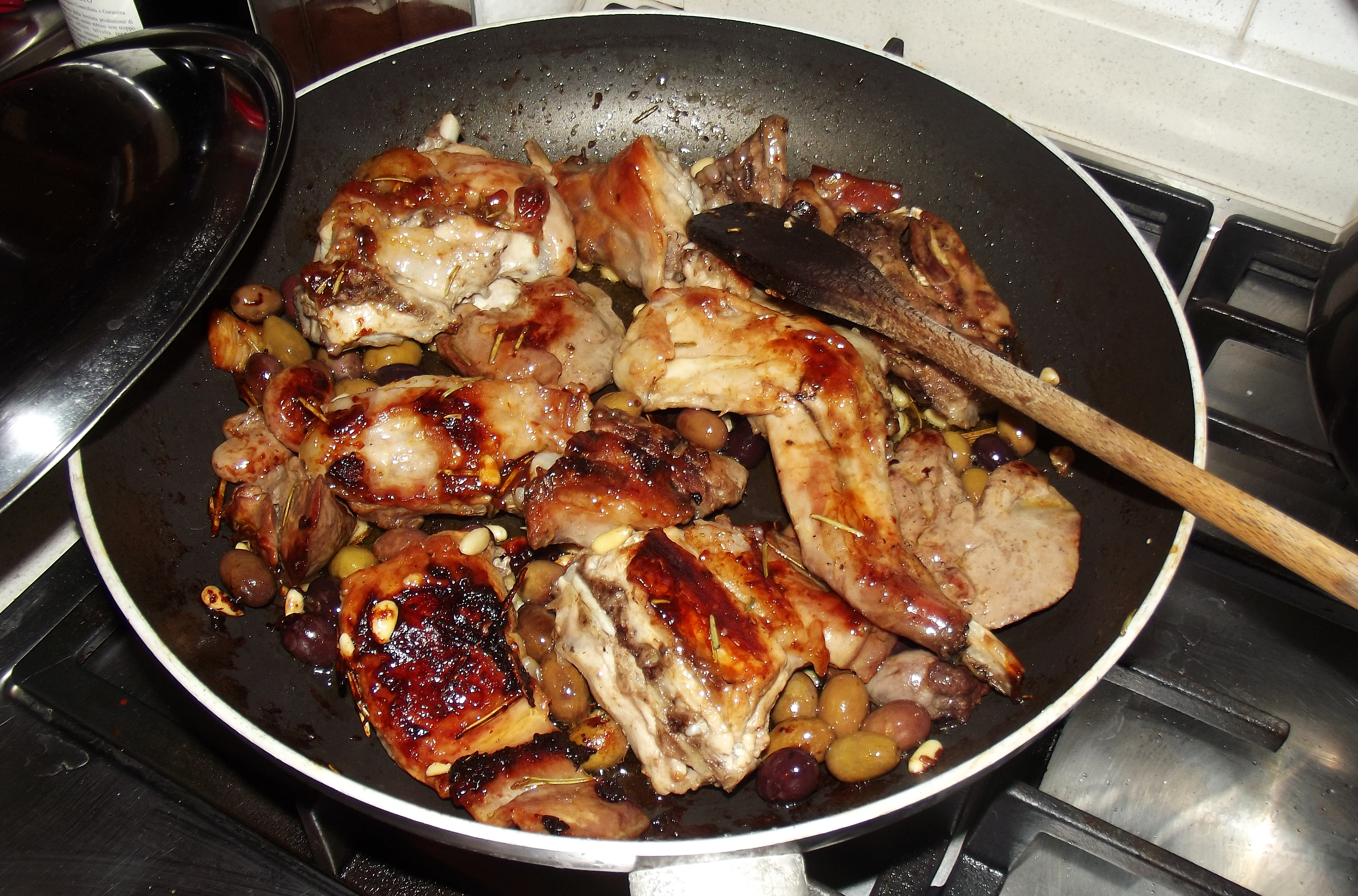
Coniglio alla sanremese

Rabbits are a highly natural, healthy, and sustainable food source for humans. Domestically, they are among the easiest animals to breed and raise for meat. Humans have hunted rabbits for food since at least the onset of the Last Glacial Maximum, and wild rabbits and hares are still hunted for their meat as game.

Wild leporids comprise a small portion of global rabbit-meat consumption. Domesticated descendants of the European rabbit (Oryctolagus cuniculus) that are bred and kept as livestock (a practice called cuniculture) account for the estimated 2 million tons of rabbit meat produced annually. Approximately 1.2 billion rabbits are slaughtered each year for meat worldwide. In 1994, the countries with the highest consumption per capita of rabbit meat were Malta with 8.89 kg (19.6 lb), Italy with 5.71 kg (12.6 lb), and Cyprus with 4.37 kg (9.6 lb). The largest producers of rabbit meat were China, Russia, Italy (specifically Veneto), France, and Spain. Rabbit meat was once a common commodity in Sydney, with European rabbits having been introduced intentionally to Australia for hunting purposes, but declined after the myxomatosis virus was intentionally introduced to control the exploding population of feral rabbits in the area.

In the United Kingdom, fresh rabbits are sold in butcher shops and markets, and some supermarkets sell frozen rabbit meat. It is sold in farmers markets there, including the Borough Market in London. Rabbit meat is a feature of Moroccan cuisine, where it is cooked in a tajine with "raisins and grilled almonds added a few minutes before serving". In China, rabbit meat is particularly popular in Sichuan cuisine, with its stewed rabbit, spicy diced rabbit, BBQ-style rabbit, and even spicy rabbit heads, which have been compared to spicy duck neck. In the United States, rabbits sold as food are typically the domestic New Zealand, Belgian, and Chinese rabbits, or Scottish hares.

An infectious disease associated with rabbits-as-food is tularemia (also known as rabbit fever), which may be contracted from an infected rabbit. The disease can cause symptoms of fever, skin ulcers and enlarged lymph nodes, and can occasionally lead to pneumonia or throat infection. Secondary vectors of tularemia include tick and fly bites, which may be present in the fur of a caught rabbit. Inhaling the bacteria during the skinning process increases the risk of getting tularemia; preventative measures against this include the use of gloves and face masks. Prior to the development of antibiotics, such as doxycycline and gentamicin, the death rate associated with tularemia infections was 60%, which has since decreased to less than 4%.

In addition to their meat, domestic rabbits are used for their wool and fur for clothing, as well as their nitrogen-rich manure and their high-protein milk. Production industries have developed domesticated rabbit breeds (such as the Angora rabbit) for the purpose of meeting these needs. In 1986, the number of rabbit skins produced annually in France was as high as 70 million, compared to 25 million mink pelts produced at the same time. However, rabbit fur is on the whole a byproduct of rabbit meat production, whereas minks are bred primarily for fur production.

Production of rabbit and hare meat

Production of rabbit and hare meat per animal

== In culture ==
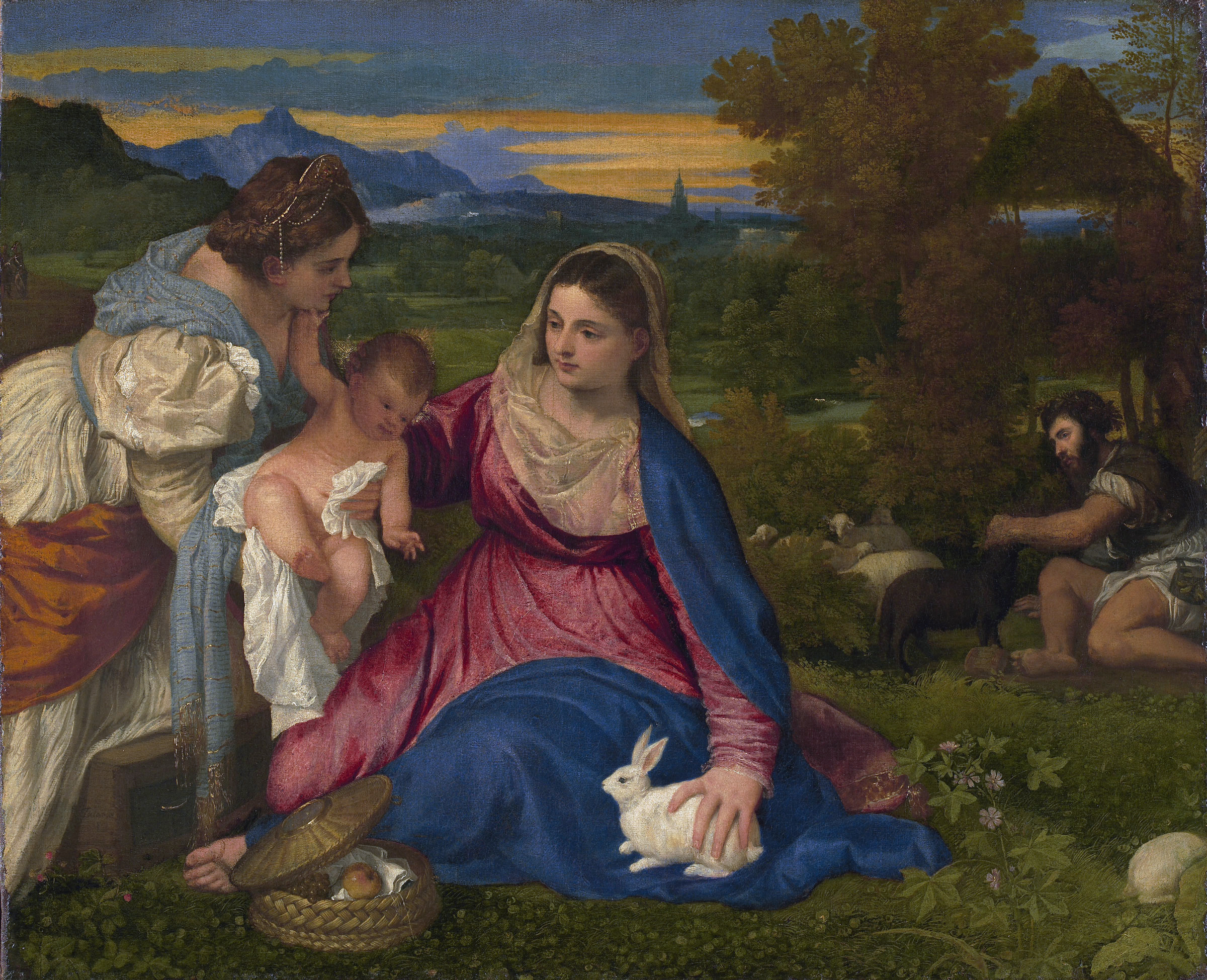
Madonna of the Rabbit, a 16th-century painting depicting the white rabbit as a symbol of fertility and purity

Rabbits are often posited by scholars as symbols of fertility, sexuality and spring, though they have been variously interpreted throughout history. Up until the end of the 18th century, it was widely believed that rabbits and hares were hermaphrodites, contributing to a possible view of rabbits as "sexually aberrant". The Easter Bunny is a figure from German folklore that then spread to America and later other parts of the world and is similar to Santa Claus, albeit both with softened roles compared to earlier incarnations of the figures.

The rabbits' role as a prey animal with few defenses evokes vulnerability and innocence in folklore and modern children's stories, and rabbits appear as sympathetic characters, able to connect easily with youth, though this particular symbolic depiction only became popular in the 1930s following the massive popularization of the pet rabbit decades before. Additionally, they have not been limited to sympathetic depictions since then, as in literature such as Watership Down and the works of Ariel Dorfman. With its reputation as a prolific breeder, the rabbit juxtaposes sexuality with innocence, as in the Playboy Bunny. The rabbit has also been used as a symbol of playfulness and endurance, as represented by the Energizer Bunny and the Duracell Bunny.

=== Folklore and mythology ===
The rabbit often appears in folklore as the trickster archetype, as he uses his cunning to outwit his enemies. In Central Africa, the common hare (Kalulu) is described as a trickster figure, and in Aztec mythology, a pantheon of four hundred rabbit gods known as Centzon Totochtin, led by Ometochtli or Two Rabbit, represented fertility, parties, and drunkenness. Rabbits in the Americas varied in mythological symbolism: in Aztec mythology, they were also associated with the moon, and in Anishinaabe traditional beliefs, held by the Ojibwe and some other Native American peoples, Nanabozho, or Great Rabbit, is an important deity related to the creation of the world. More broadly, a rabbit's foot may be carried as an amulet, believed to bring protection and good luck. This belief is found in many parts of the world, with the earliest use being recorded in Europe c. 600 BC.

Rabbits also appear in Chinese, Vietnamese, Japanese and Korean mythology, though rabbits are a relatively new introduction to some of these regions. In Chinese folklore, rabbits accompany Chang'e on the Moon, and the moon rabbit is a prominent symbol in the Mid-Autumn Festival. In the Chinese New Year, the zodiacal rabbit or hare is one of the twelve celestial animals in the Chinese zodiac. At the time of the zodiacal cycles becoming associated with animals in the Han dynasty, only hares were native to China, with the currently extant breeds of rabbit in China being of European origin. The Vietnamese zodiac includes a zodiacal cat in place of the rabbit. The most common explanation is that the Vietnamese word for "cat" (mèo) sounds like an old Chinese word for "rabbit" (卯, mao). In Japanese tradition, rabbits live on the Moon where they make mochi. This comes from interpreting the pattern of dark patches on the moon as a rabbit standing on tiptoes on the left pounding on an usu, a Japanese mortar; in some images, this rabbit is said to be creating a potion of immortality. In Korean mythology, as in Japanese, rabbits live on the moon making rice cakes ("tteok" in Korean).

Rabbits have also appeared in religious symbolism. Buddhism, Christianity, and Judaism have associations with an ancient circular motif called the three rabbits (or "three hares"). Its meaning ranges from "peace and tranquility" to the Holy Trinity. The tripartite symbol also appears in heraldry. In Jewish folklore, rabbits are associated with cowardice, a usage still current in contemporary Israeli spoken Hebrew. The original Hebrew word (shfanim, שפנים) refers to the hyrax, but early translations to English interpreted the word to mean "rabbit", as no hyraxes were known to northern Europe. In Greek and Roman mythology, rabbits were associated with the hunting goddesses Artemis and Diana. Ancient Greek hunters were instructed to not hunt newborn rabbits, and to leave them "for the goddess". The constellation Lepus is named for the rabbit, and was given its name by Ptolemy c. 150 CE.

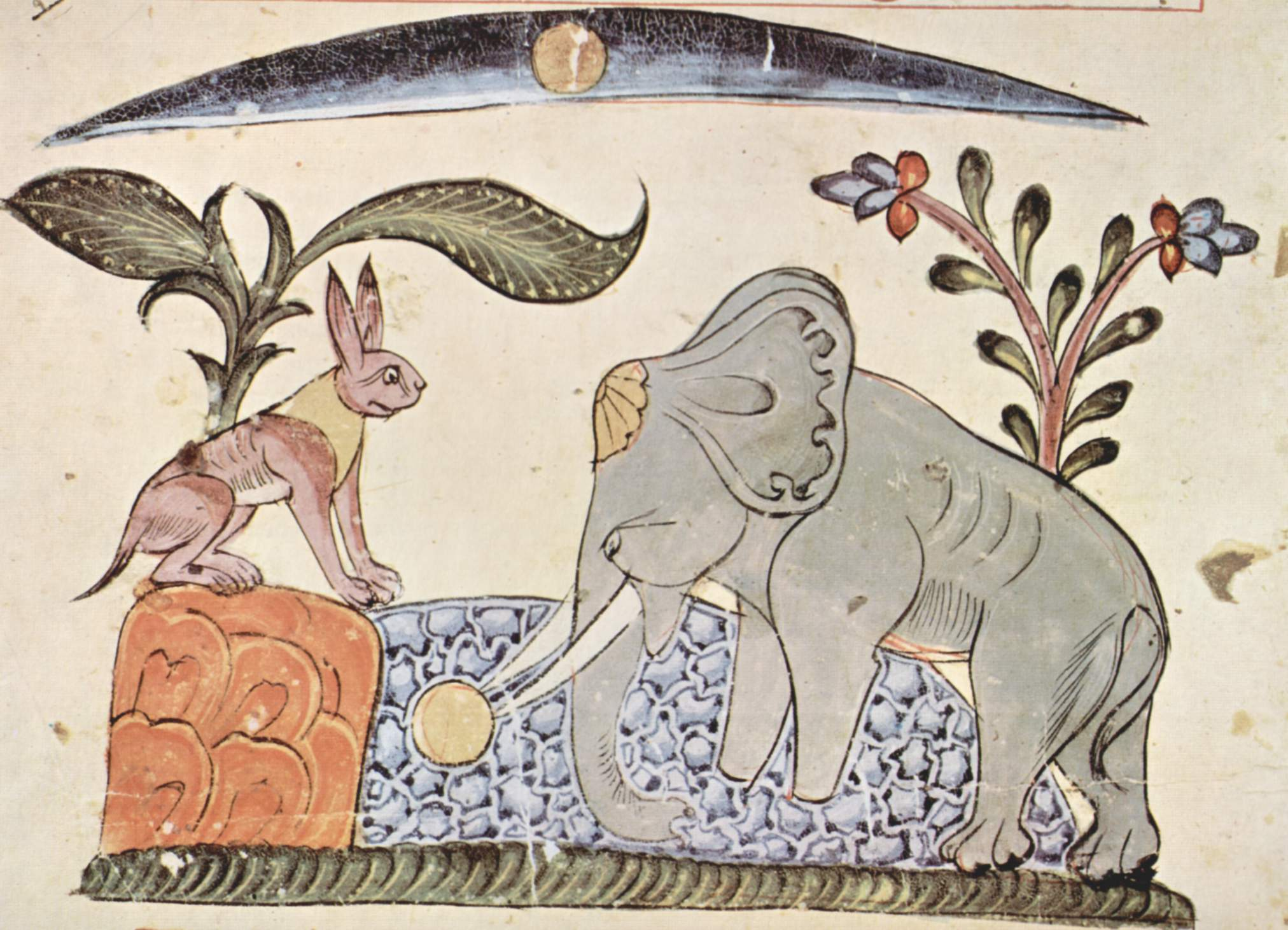
Rabbit fools Elephant by showing the reflection of the moon. Illustration (from 1354) of the Panchatantra

"Three rabbits" motif, Coat of arms of Corbenay, France

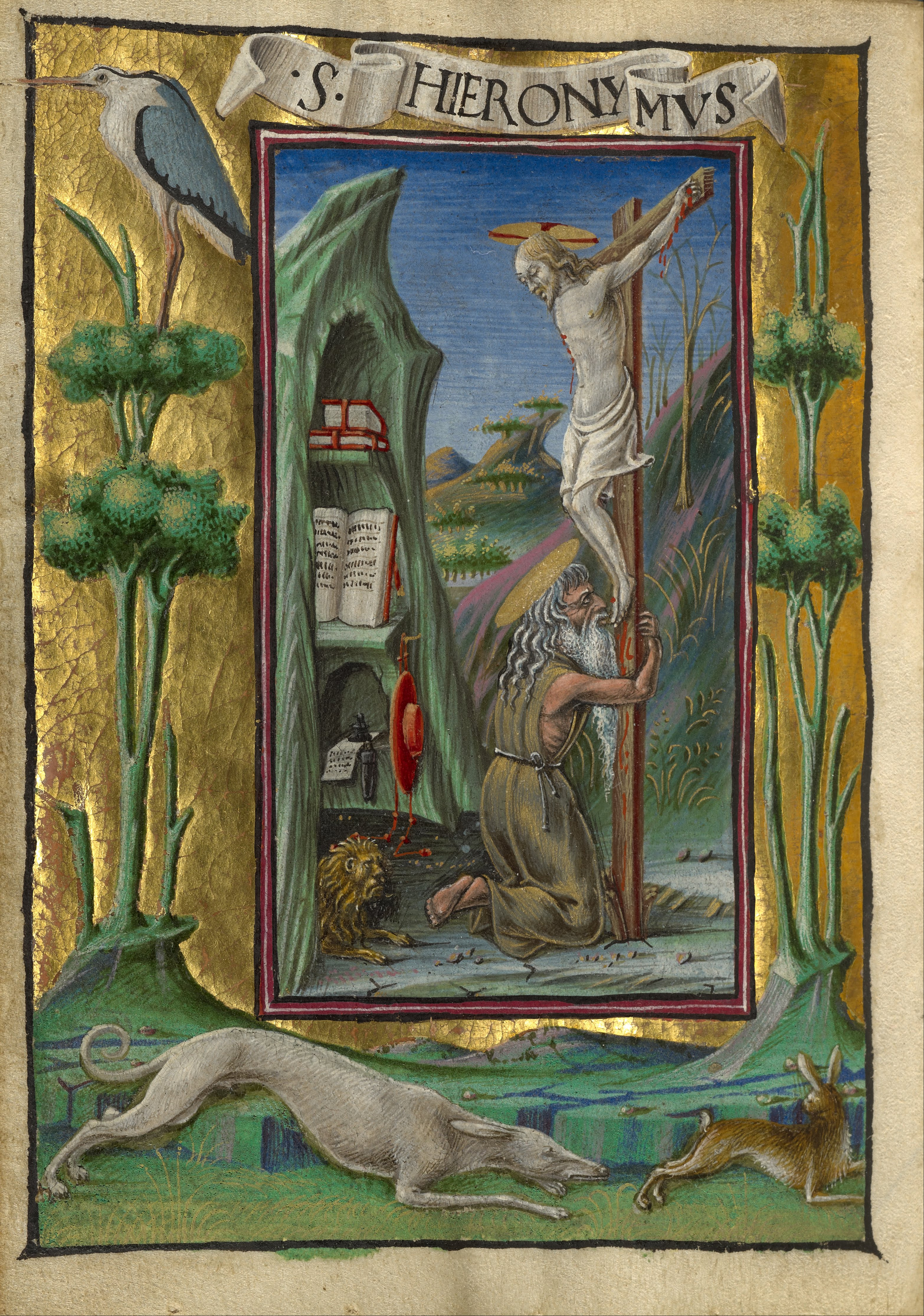
Saint Jerome in the Desert, by Taddeo Crivelli (died about 1479)

=== Modern times ===
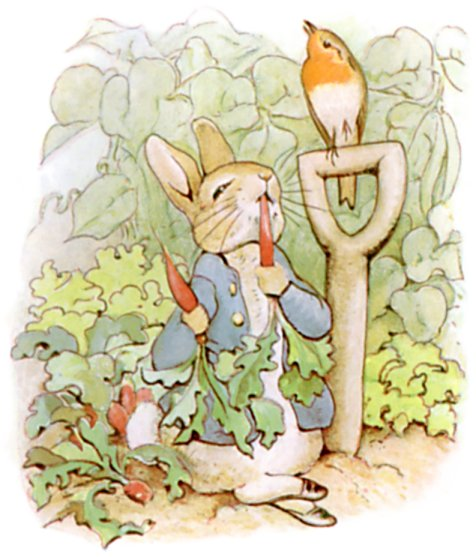
Beatrix Potter's Peter Rabbit

The rabbit as trickster is a part of American popular culture, as Br'er Rabbit (from African-American folktales and, later, Disney animation) and Bugs Bunny (the cartoon character from Warner Bros.), for example.

Anthropomorphized rabbits have appeared in film and literature, in Alice's Adventures in Wonderland (the White Rabbit and the March Hare characters), in Watership Down (including the film and television adaptations), in Rabbit Hill (by Robert Lawson), and in the Peter Rabbit stories (by Beatrix Potter). In the 1920s, Oswald the Lucky Rabbit was a popular cartoon character.

On the Isle of Portland in Dorset, UK, the rabbit is said to be unlucky, and speaking the creature's name can cause upset among older island residents. This is thought to date back to early times in the local quarrying industry, where, to save space, extracted stones that were not fit for sale were set aside in what became tall, unstable walls. The local rabbits' tendency to burrow there would weaken the walls, and their collapse would result in injuries or even death. In the local culture to this day, the rabbit (when he has to be referred to) may instead be called a "long ears" or "underground mutton" so as not to risk bringing a downfall upon oneself.

In other parts of Britain and in North America, "Rabbit rabbit rabbit" is one variant of an apotropaic or talismanic superstition that involves saying or repeating the word "rabbit" (or "rabbits" or "white rabbits" or some combination thereof) out loud upon waking on the first day of each month, because doing so is believed to ensure good fortune for the duration of that month.

The "rabbit test" is a term first used in 1949 for the Friedman test, an early diagnostic tool for detecting a pregnancy in humans. It is a common misconception (or perhaps an urban legend) that the test-rabbit would die if the woman was pregnant. This led to the phrase "the rabbit died" becoming a euphemism for a positive pregnancy test.

Many modern children's stories and cartoons portray rabbits as particularly fond of eating carrots, largely due to the popularity of Bugs Bunny, whose carrot-eating habit was modeled after Peter Warne, the character played by Clark Gable in the 1934 romantic comedy It Happened One Night. This is misleading, as wild rabbits do not naturally prefer carrots over other plants. The misconception has led to some owners of domestic rabbits feeding them carrot-heavy diets. Carrots are high in sugar, and excessive consumption can be unhealthy.

== See also ==
- Animal track
- Cuniculture
- Hare games
- Jackalope
- List of animal names
- List of rabbit breeds
- Rabbits in the arts
