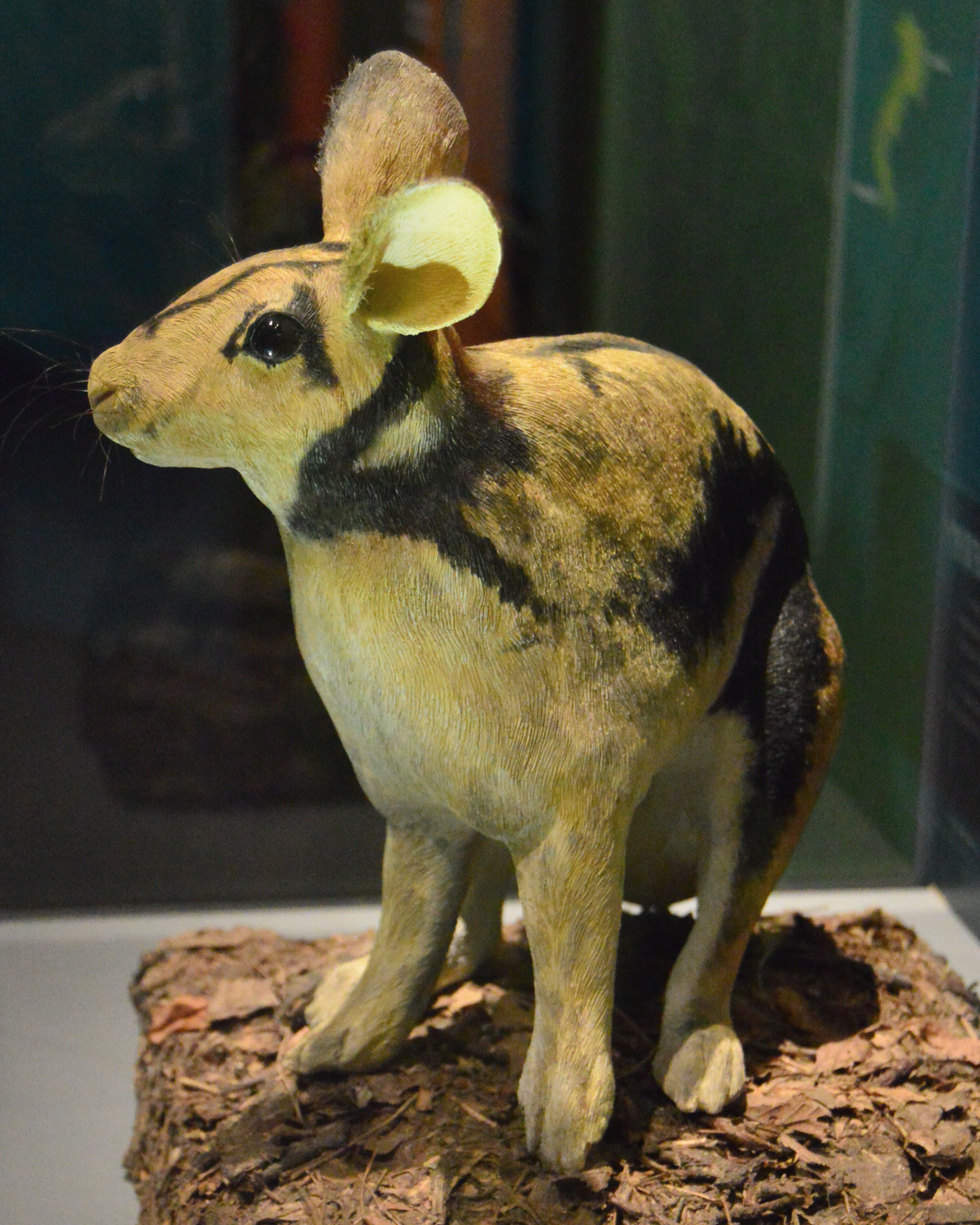
- Sumatran striped rabbit

Scientific classification
- Kingdom: Animalia
- Phylum: Chordata
- Class: Mammalia
- Infraclass: Placentalia
- Order: Lagomorpha
- Family: Leporidae
- Genus: Nesolagus; Forsyth Major, 1899

Type species
- Lepus netscheri Schlegel, 1880

Species
- Nesolagus netscheri; Nesolagus timminsi; Nesolagus sinensis †
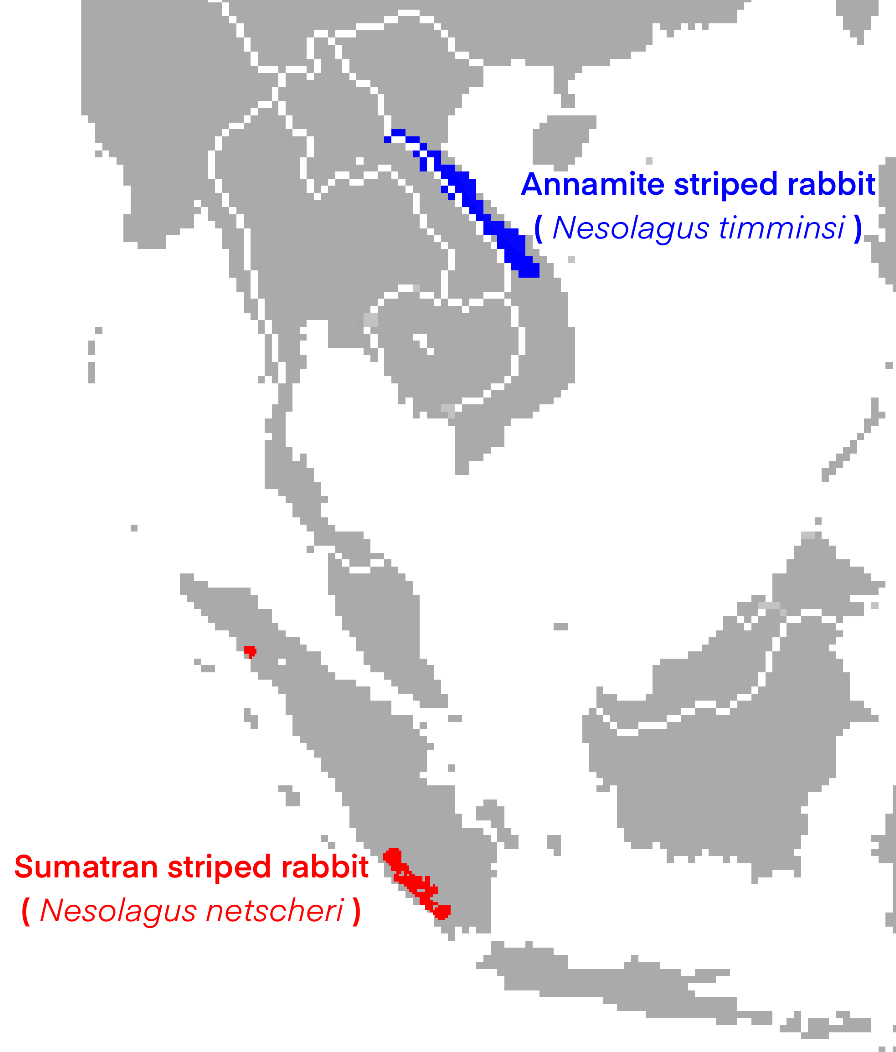

= Nesolagus =

Genus of mammals

Nesolagus is a genus of rabbits containing three species of striped rabbit: the Annamite striped rabbit, the Sumatran striped rabbit, and the extinct N. sinensis. Overall there is very little known about the genus as a whole, most information coming from the Sumatran rabbit.

== Taxonomy ==
Until 1996, the only known species belonging to the genus Nesolagus was the Sumatran striped rabbit (Nesolagus netscheri), a species restricted to the Sumatran mountain range of Bukit Barisan which was described in 1880 (as Lepus netscheri) by German naturalist Hermann Schlegel. The name Nesolagus was erected by Charles Immanuel Forsyth Major in 1899, though he did not clarify if it should describe a genus on its own or a subgenus of Caprolagus; it was solidified as a genus containing the Sumatran striped rabbit in 1904 by Marcus Ward Lyon, Jr. in his work Classification of the Hares and their Allies.

The genus Nesolagus includes three species, one extinct:

- Nesolagus netscheri, Sumatran striped rabbit
- Nesolagus timminsi, Annamite striped rabbit
- †Nesolagus sinensis, early Pleistocene of China

According to phylogenetic analysis performed by Leandro Iraçabal and colleagues in 2024, the genus is thought to have evolved in the Miocene epoch. Its sister clade is a group that includes the red rock hares (Pronolagus) and the Bunyoro rabbit (Poelagus marjorita):

- Leporidae
  - - Nesolagus
    - - Pronolagus
      - Poelagus marjorita
  - Other leporids

== Behavior ==
Due to the small number of individuals, and because of the rare sightings of this genus, there is not much information available on its behavior. One thing that we do know however, is that the Sumatran rabbit is nocturnal and hides out in burrows which it does not make itself and does not really like to go out looking for food for itself in places that are too far from its home.

== Description ==
Descriptions of the species are partly based on images made by camera traps; for the Sumatran striped rabbit the cameras were set in the montane forests of Sumatra, while the Annamite Striped rabbit was seen in the Annamite mountain range of Laos and Vietnam. Both species of striped rabbit have seven brown or black stripes and a red rump and white underside. They are the only species of rabbits to have stripes. They are relatively small with a length of about 368–417 mm (14.5–16.4 in), with a tail of about 17 mm (0.67 in) and ears about 43–45 mm (1.7–1.8 in) long. Thus the ears of Nesolagus are only about half as long as in most rabbits, e.g. in the genus Lepus. Their fur is soft and dense, overlaid by longer, harsher hairs.

== Distribution ==
Striped rabbits are found in only four locations. The Sumatran striped rabbit has been found in the Barisan Mountains in western Sumatra, Indonesia, and the Annamite striped rabbit has been found in the Annamite mountains on the border between Vietnam and Laos. The fossils (parts of the left mandible with several teeth) of the extinct Nesolagus sinensis were found in Chongzou Ecological Park in the Guangxi province of southwest China.
