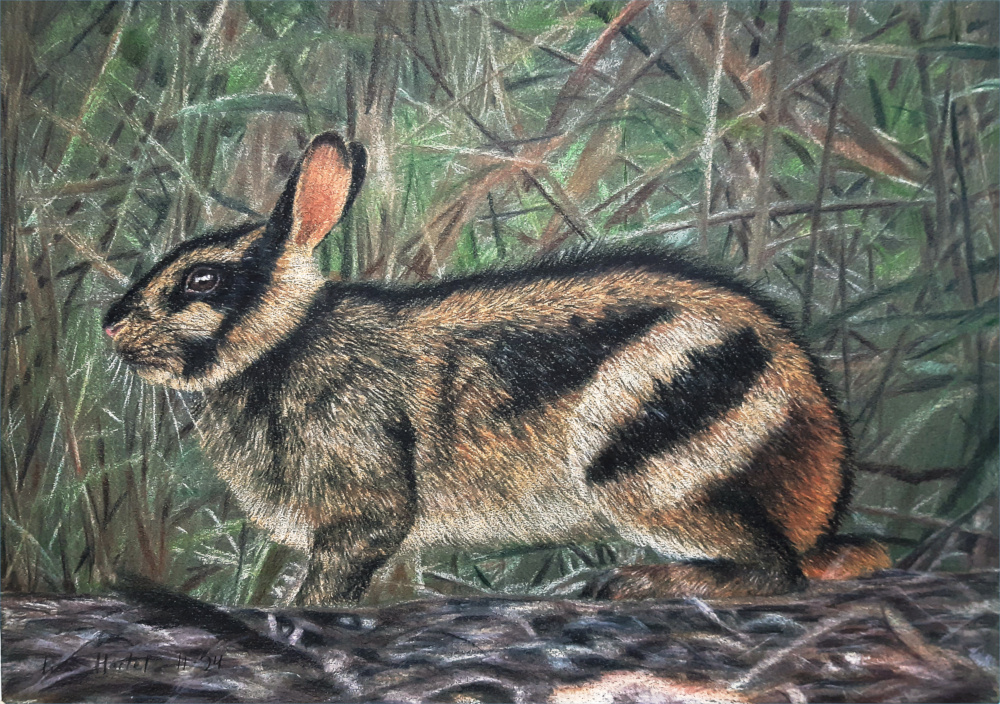
- Illustration of a Sumatran striped rabbit

Conservation status
- Data Deficient (IUCN 3.1)

Scientific classification
- Kingdom: Animalia
- Phylum: Chordata
- Class: Mammalia
- Order: Lagomorpha
- Family: Leporidae
- Genus: Nesolagus
- Species: N. netscheri

Binomial name
- Nesolagus netscheri (Schlegel, 1880)
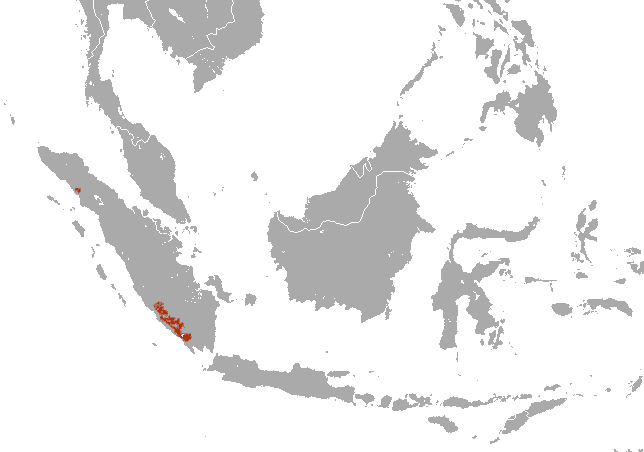
- Sumatran striped rabbit range

Synonyms
- Lepus netscheri Schlegel, 1880

= Sumatran striped rabbit =

Species of mammal

The Sumatran striped rabbit (Nesolagus netscheri), also known as the Sumatra short-eared rabbit or Sumatran rabbit, is a species of rabbit found in the montane forests of the Barisan Mountains in northwestern Sumatra and surrounding areas. Similar in size to the European rabbit, but with shorter limbs and muzzle and a broader head, the Sumatran striped rabbit is distinguished by the black or dark brown stripes running across its yellowish grey body. Its close relative, the recently discovered Annamite striped rabbit, has similar fur patterns, but is only found on the Laos–Vietnam border.

Like other rabbits, the Sumatran striped rabbit eats plants. It prefers the vegetation of those in the genus Cyrtandra, but will feed on fallen fruit and plants in the Araceae family as well. It avoids cultivated fruits and grains. Studies on the rabbit suggest that it is a solitary, nocturnal animal. Little else is known about its ecology.

The Sumatran striped rabbit has been described as the rarest rabbit in the world. It has been rarely seen, despite extensive studies in its habitat to capture the rabbit and other rare species on camera traps. The species is threatened by habitat loss, as much of the habitable forest it lives in has been cut down for timber and to grow tea and coffee. The rabbits are also smuggled out of the country to be sold as exotic pets. The species' classification has varied since it was initially evaluated by the International Union for Conservation of Nature in 1994, but as of 2019 it is considered a data deficient species.

== Etymology and taxonomy ==
German biologist Hermann Schlegel first described the Sumatran striped rabbit in 1880, based on a specimen provided to the Rijksmuseum van Natuurlijke Historie by E. Netscher. Netscher had obtained the specimen while working in Padang Pandjang, and Schlegel named the species, Lepus netscheri, after him. It was given the type locality of "Sumatra: Padang-Padjang" at an elevation of 2,000 feet (610 metres). Swiss naturalist Charles Immanuel Forsyth Major erected a new genus, Nesolagus, for the Sumatran striped rabbit in 1899, which was recognised by the American mammalogist Marcus Ward Lyon Jr. in his 1904 work that reclassified many of the leporids.

The vernacular terminology for "rabbit" in Indonesia is either borrowed from other languages to refer to foreign species of rabbit (arnab from the Arabic أرنب and kelinci from the Dutch word konijntje) or not distinguished from the word used to describe felines (kuching, with rabbits or hares known as e.g. kuching belanda or kuching tapai). Local Sumatrans did not have a name for the Sumatran rabbit at the time of its discovery, as they were not aware that the species even existed. Some have reportedly referred to the species as a "marmot".

The species is closely related to the Annamite striped rabbit (Nesolagus timminsi), which was discovered in 1996 and described in 2000. Though the rabbit species are similar in appearance, genetic testing indicates that they have been isolated from each other for roughly 8 million years. A likely ancestor to both the Sumatran and Annamite striped rabbits is the extinct species Nesolagus sinensis, of which fossils have been discovered in southwest China. No subspecies of the Sumatran striped rabbit are known.

== Description ==
The Sumatran striped rabbit has an adult weight of 1.5 kilograms (3.3 lb) and is between 37 and 39 centimetres (14.6 and 15.4 in) in length, with a tail 17 millimetres (0.67 in) long, a skull length of 67–74 mm (2.6–2.9 in), hind foot length of 67–87 mm (2.6–3.4 in), and ear length of 34–45 mm (1.3–1.8 in). Its yellowish grey body is marked by stripes of dark brown or black. Towards the rump, the rabbit's base color tends towards a rusty brown. It has whitish underparts, including the chin and insides of the legs. Its black ears are so short as to reach only to the eye when folded forwards. The limbs are grey-brown and the tail, notably short and having only 12 bones, is reddish. Most leporids have between 19 and 24 bones in their tail. Coloration patterns vary between individuals. Their fur is soft and dense, overlaid by longer coarse guard hairs. The skin is notably delicate. One specimen was found from South Sumatra that had unusually long ears and shorter feet and tail. Like other leporids, it has a dental formula of 2.0.3.31.0.2.3 × 2 = 28—two pairs of upper and one pair of lower incisors, no canines, three upper and two lower premolars on each side, and three upper and lower molars on either side of the jaw.

Sumatran rabbits can be differentiated from the European rabbit (Oryctolagus cuniculus), which is sometimes kept in captivity in Sumatra and is of a similar size, by their stripes and slightly shorter ears. The limbs of the Sumatran striped rabbit are also shorter, the head broader, and the muzzle less pronounced compared to the European rabbit. Compared to the Annamite striped rabbit, Sumatran striped rabbits have a shorter skull length, their second upper premolar is shorter, and it has a larger foramen lacerum (a hole in the base of its skull). The two species are otherwise very similar in appearance.

== Behaviour and ecology ==
The Sumatran striped rabbit is nocturnal, spending the day nearly motionless when observed in captivity. A unique genus of fleas, Nesolagobius, relies upon it as a host. Its social structure is largely unknown, but it is thought to be a solitary animal. Compared to other rabbits, it is a slow-moving species, and may freeze on discovery. Nothing is known about its reproduction.

The rabbit rests in the burrows of other animals and the hollows of trees. It usually eats the stalk and leaves of understory plants, but captive rabbits will eat grain and tropical fruits. Its preferred food is the vegetation of plants in the genus Cyrtandra, but other plants such as those in the Araceae family and native fallen fruits are eaten if necessary.

== Distribution and habitat ==
This species is endemic to the Barisan Mountains in northwest Sumatra, Indonesia. It has also been found in South, southwest, and West Sumatra. It lives in forests at altitudes of 600–1,600 metres (2,000–5,200 ft) above sea level. Some sightings have occurred in lowland forests as low as 544 metres (1,785 ft) above sea level.

The Sumatran striped rabbit prefers to live in montane forests with volcanic soil. It makes its shelter and feeds among the dense understory, generally avoiding clearings. Records of the rabbit are known from every Sumatran national park that includes montane forest habitats.

== Threats and conservation status ==
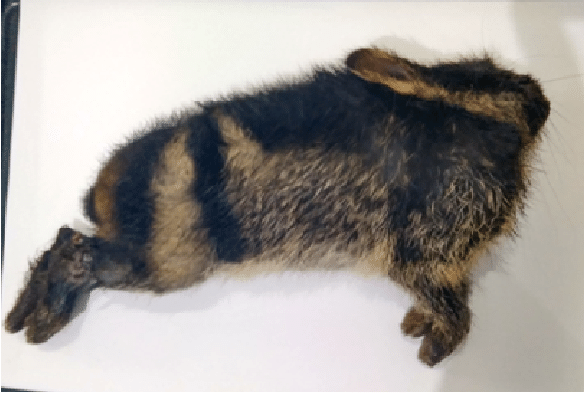
A Sumatran striped rabbit specimen recovered from a village in Pagar Alam, South Sumatra

The Sumatran striped rabbit has been described as the rarest rabbit in the world. It is sometimes smuggled out of Indonesia for sale in the exotic pet trade. Sales often occur through social media postings, and destinations include Thailand and India. In 2022, a farmer attempted to sell a live striped rabbit, opportunistically caught after a flash flood, on Facebook. Kerinci Seblat National Park authorities confiscated it and returned it to the wild. Conservationists have pushed for the Sumatran and Annamite striped rabbits to be included in the CITES appendices, which would restrict international trade of the animals. The rabbits' native countries include them on lists of protected species, but this protection is not strongly enforced. While the rabbit is not hunted for its meat, as it reportedly tastes bad, it may be caught in snares that are intended for other animals.

Little research on the Sumatran striped rabbit has been done, despite being an animal described in the 19th century. The species was rarely observed throughout the 20th century, with one sighting being recorded in 1972 and the next occurring in 2000. Three more observations were recorded up until the 2010s, when much of the research on the species started to emerge. As of 2019, the International Union for Conservation of Nature (IUCN) lists the Sumatran striped rabbit as a data deficient species, citing few observations despite exhaustive surveys and camera trapping efforts. Its rarity may be the result of deforestation and habitat loss. The forests which the species inhabits are cleared for timber, tea and coffee plantations, and human habitations. In a preliminary study of potential lagomorph conservation actions, John E.C. Flux wrote in 1990 that some populations had been confused with non-native European rabbit colonies that have become established in deforested areas. A plan to conserve the species was proposed in 1979, but was not funded; Flux advised that the most pertinent course of action at the time of writing was to discover and protect a viable population of Sumatran rabbits. Between 1994 and 2008, the IUCN had variously described the species as endangered, critically endangered, and vulnerable on account of a complete lack of ecology information on the species. Studies that have a more focused methodology to detect the species have been recommended to develop targeted conservation efforts. The species is known to occur in Bukit Barisan Selatan National Park, Kerinci Seblat National Park, and Isau-Isau Wildlife Reserve. Most observations of the species in the 2010s have occurred in Bukit Barisan Selatan and Kerinci Seblat.
