= Hương Sơn district =

Coordinates: 18.417°N 106.417°E

Hương Sơn district Huyện Hương Sơn
- District
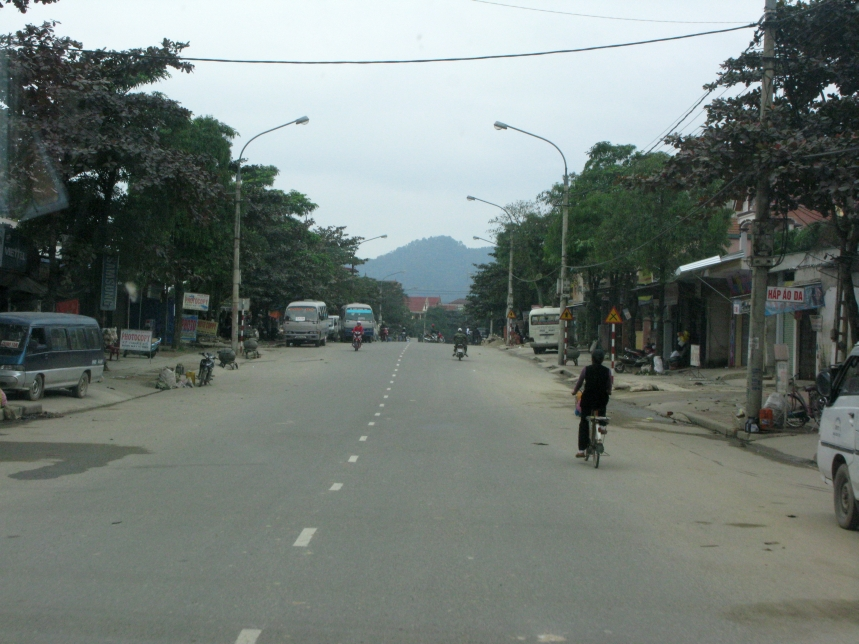
- View of National Route 8

- Seal
- Interactive map of Hương Sơn district
- Location within Vietnam Location within Southeast Asia Location within Asia
- Country: Vietnam
- Region: North Central Coast
- Province: Hà Tĩnh
- Founded: 1469
- Capital: Phố Châu

Government
  - Chairman of the People's Committee: Lê Minh Khuê
  - Chairman of the People's Council: Hà Nội
  - Chairman of the Fatherland Front: Nguyễn Ngọc Anh

Area
  - Total: 366.9 sq mi (950.2 km^{2})

Population (2003)
  - Total: 125,308
- Time zone: UTC+7 (Indochina Time)
- Website: huongson.hatinh.gov.vn

Hương Sơn is a district in the North Central Coast of Vietnam. It is part of Hà Tĩnh province. In 2003, the district had a population of 125,308. The district covers an area of 1101 km^{2}. The district capital lies at Phố Châu.

== Geography ==
Hà Tĩnh Province is located in the northern part of central Vietnam, about 340 km south of Hanoi, bordered by Nghệ An province in the north, Quảng Bình province in the south, Laos in the west, and Đức Thọ district in the east.

== Administration ==
The district consists of 2 towns, Phố Châu (also the district capital) and Tây Sơn, and 23 communes: An Hòa Thịnh, Kim Hoa, Quang Diệm, Sơn Bằng, Sơn Bình, Sơn Châu, Sơn Giang, Sơn Hàm, Sơn Hồng, Sơn Kim 1, Sơn Kim 2, Sơn Lâm, Sơn Lễ, Sơn Lĩnh, Sơn Long, Sơn Ninh, Sơn Phú, Sơn Tây, Sơn Tiến, Sơn Trà, Sơn Trung, Sơn Trường and Tân Mỹ Hà.
