= Autopista México-Puebla =

Major toll highway between Mexico City and Puebla

Autopista México-Puebla
- Autopista México-Puebla highlighted in red
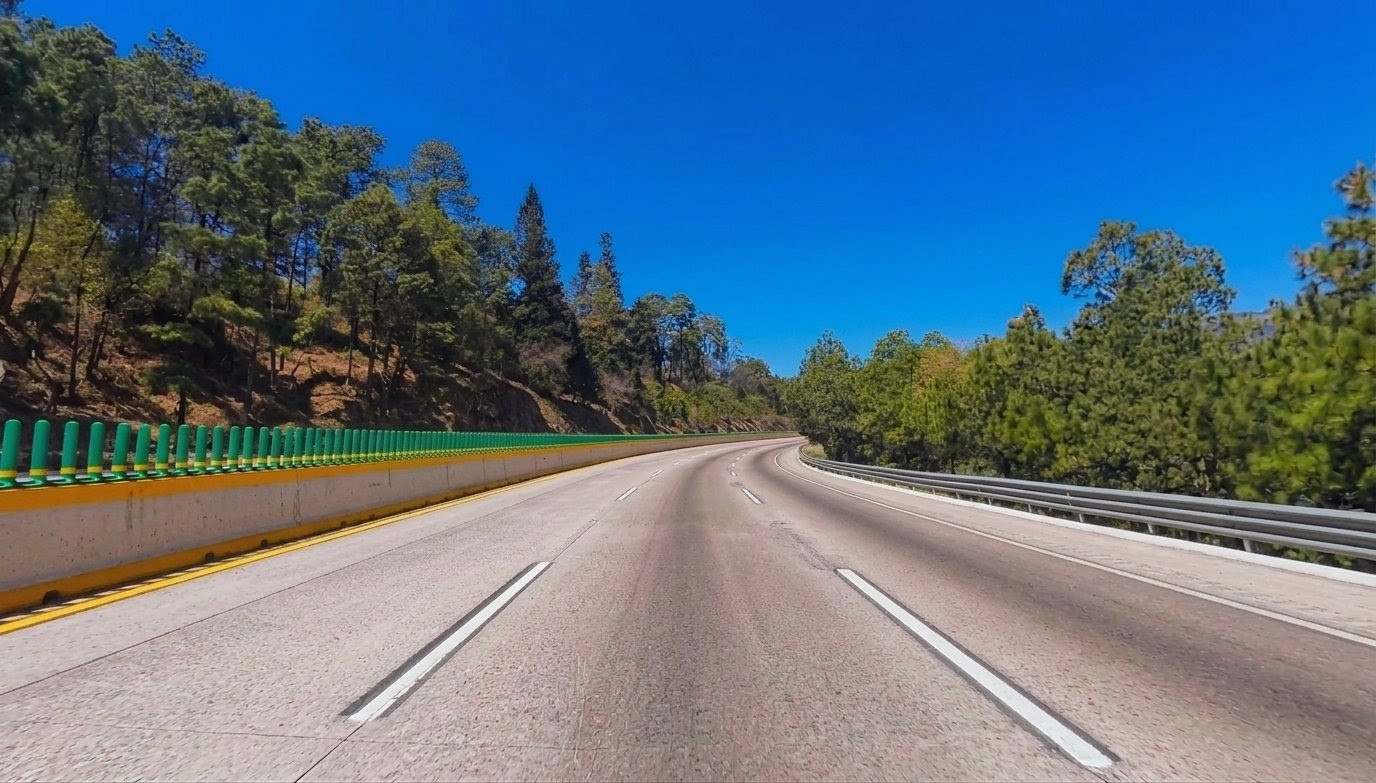
- Autopista México–Puebla crossing the Sierra Nevada

Route information
- Maintained by Caminos y Puentes Federales (CAPUFE)
- Length: 124.9 km (77.6 mi)
- Existed: May 5, 1962–present

Major junctions
- West end: Distribuidor Vial La Concordia in Mexico City
- La Concordia Interchange (km 17); Fed. 115 near Chalco (km 32); Circuito Exterior Mexiquense (Mex 5D) (km 32.5); Fed. 150 at Río Frío de Juárez (km 63); Fed. M40D (Arco Norte) near San Martín Texmelucan (km 92); Puebla International Airport access road (km 101); Fed. 190 (Anillo Periférico Ecológico) (km 114); Fed. 119D (Autopista Puebla–Tlaxcala) (km 114)
- East end: Autopista Puebla–Orizaba in Puebla

Location
- Country: Mexico
- States: State of Mexico, Puebla

Highway system
- Mexican Federal Highways; List; Autopistas

The Autopista México-Puebla (English: Mexico–Puebla toll road) is a toll highway approximately 130 kilometres (81 mi) long that connects Mexico City with the city of Puebla, crossing the eastern part of the State of Mexico. Officially, it is part of Federal Highway 150D, serving as the main route between the center of the country and southeastern Mexico.

== History ==
The Autopista México–Puebla was inaugurated on May 5, 1962, by President Adolfo López Mateos, with an initial investment of over 220 million pesos. The highway was opened as part of the commemorations for the centennial of the Battle of Puebla. During construction, more than 9 million cubic meters of material were moved in the Llano Grande and Río Frío areas of Ixtapaluca, State of Mexico. This route significantly shortened travel times between Puebla and Mexico City, replacing the old Federal Highway 150. The highway's development was a key factor in the 1965 establishment of the Volkswagen automotive plant in San Lorenzo Almecatla, Puebla.

In the 1980s, the original dirt and vegetation median was replaced with high-resistance concrete barriers, particularly in the high-altitude Río Frío section. In 1997, following the insolvency of several concessionaires after the 1994 economic crisis, the highway was integrated into the FARAC (Trust for the Support of the Rescue of Concessioned Highways) model, along with other major national routes.

=== 2010s ===
Between 2015 and May 2016, major maintenance was conducted from kilometer 32 to 63 (stretching from the edge of the Ixtapaluca urban area to Río Frío). These works involved replacing the old asphalt with 34-centimeter-thick concrete slabs. On October 13, 2016, a 14.2-kilometer section (from km 17 to km 30) was expanded to 12 lanes, connecting Calzada Ignacio Zaragoza to the first toll plaza at a cost of MX$2.3 billion.

On October 18, 2016, during the administration of Enrique Peña Nieto, an elevated viaduct (locally known as the segundo piso) was inaugurated in Puebla. The 15.3-kilometer structure begins at the Volkswagen plant and ends near the Estadio Cuauhtémoc (km 115 to km 128), with a total cost of MX$10.5 billion. in December 2017, the concession title was legally modified to allow FONADIN to use toll revenues as a guarantee for stock market bonds (monetization). The officially concessioned section spans 97.06 km.

=== 2020s ===
On August 6, 2024, ejidatarios from Santa Rita Tlahuapan blocked both directions of the highway between kilometers 70 and 74, demanding unpaid compensation for land expropriated in 1958. The blockade lasted 90 hours, ending on August 10 after agreements were signed to review land appraisals.

In February 2024, the concessionaire Aleatica confirmed a massive investment of over 530 million pesos for the maintenance and functional expansion of the elevated viaduct in Puebla. The agreement included a one-time contribution of 45 million pesos and annual payments of 5 million pesos for the upkeep of the lower level, which experiences the most significant wear.

In early 2025, the government of the State of Puebla issued a tender (SPFA-OP-LPE-2025-034) for the maintenance of various sections connecting to the viaduct. The scheduled works included deep patching, joint sealing, and asphalt resurfacing. By August 2025, the projects were allocated a minimum capital of 7.6 million pesos with a 90-day execution period.

== Route description ==
=== La Concordia Interchange ===
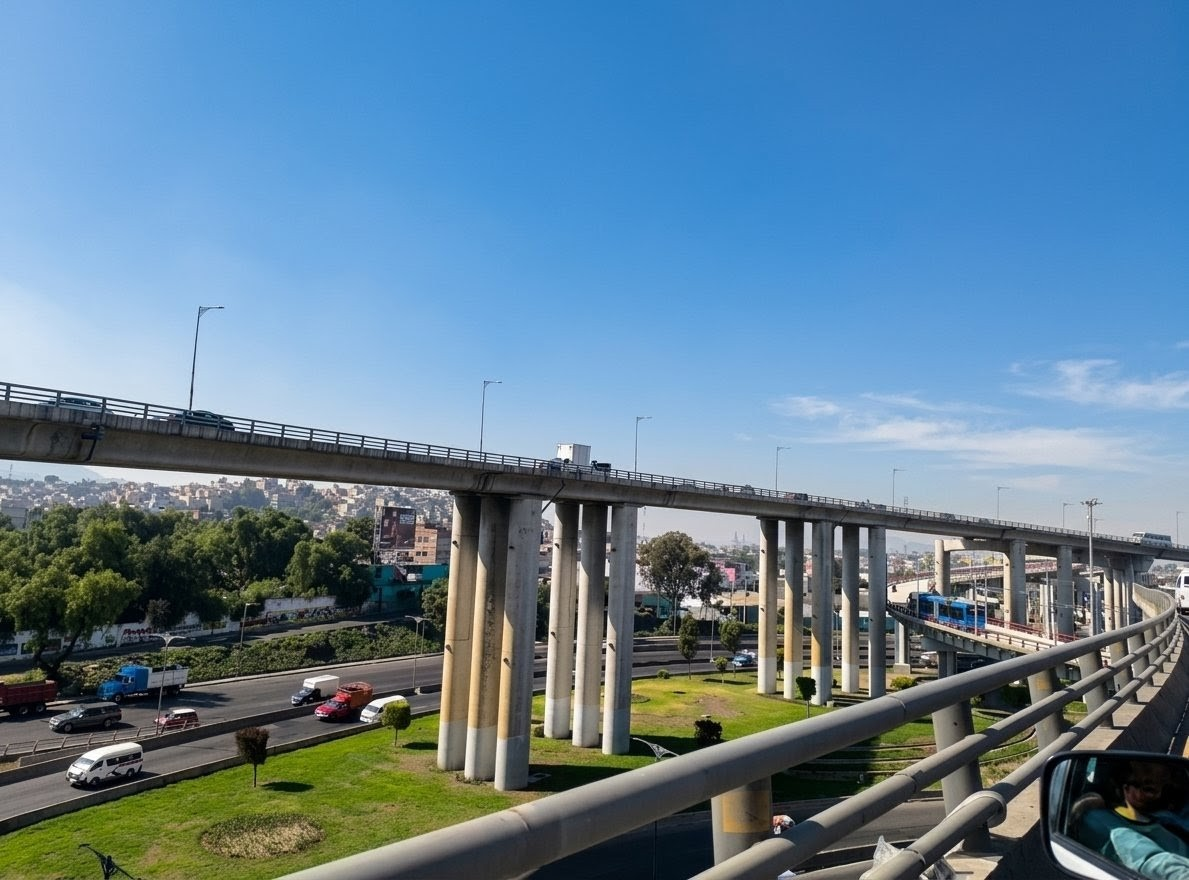
La Concordia interchange in the morning

The Autopista México–Puebla begins at the La Concordia Interchange or Zaragoza – Texcoco Interchange in the Iztapalapa borough of Mexico City. Inaugurated on December 16, 2007, by then-Head of Government Marcelo Ebrard and the Governor of the State of Mexico, Enrique Peña Nieto, the interchange bridges span 3,737 meters (12,260 ft). Its construction required an investment of 1.05 billion pesos. The interchange serves as the primary connection between Calzada Ignacio Zaragoza and the Federal Highway 150D, located just south of the Santa Marta multimodal station.

=== La Concordia–San Marcos Huixtoco section ===
After leaving the La Concordia interchange, the highway expands to 12 lanes, traversing the eastern part of the Mexico City metropolitan area. From Santa Marta to Chalco, the center of the highway hosts Trolleybus Line 11, flanked by the municipalities of Chalco and Ixtapaluca. In the Ixtapaluca area, it connects with Mexican Federal Highway 115 and the Circuito Exterior Mexiquense (State Highway 5D). The section ends at the San Marcos toll plaza, operated by CAPUFE.

=== San Marcos Huixtoco–Santa Rita Tlahuapan section ===
In this six-lane section, the highway crosses the Trans-Mexican Volcanic Belt (Sierra Nevada), a stretch characterized by sharp curves and pine forests. Around kilometer 63, the route passes south of the town of Río Frío de Juárez. After crossing the border between the State of Mexico and Puebla, the highway begins a continuous descent toward the Puebla-Tlaxcala Valley. The town of Santa Rita Tlahuapan is located near kilometer 71.

=== Santa Rita Tlahuapan–Puebla section ===
Descending from the Sierra Nevada and the Río Frío area, the highway enters the state of Puebla through the municipality of Santa Rita Tlahuapan. The road layout transitions from sharp curves to a straighter, flatter path. Heading southeast, at approximately kilometer 91, the highway reaches San Martín Texmelucan. At kilometer 92, it intersects with the Arco Norte (M40D) and the San Martín–Cholula state road. The San Martín toll plaza is located at kilometer 97, followed by the access road to the Puebla International Airport at kilometer 101. At kilometer 108, an interchange connects to the town of San Miguel Xoxtla. Before entering northern Puebla and merging into the elevated viaduct, it connects with the Anillo Periférico Ecológico (Highway 190) and Highway 119D at kilometer 114.

=== Puebla Elevated Viaduct ===
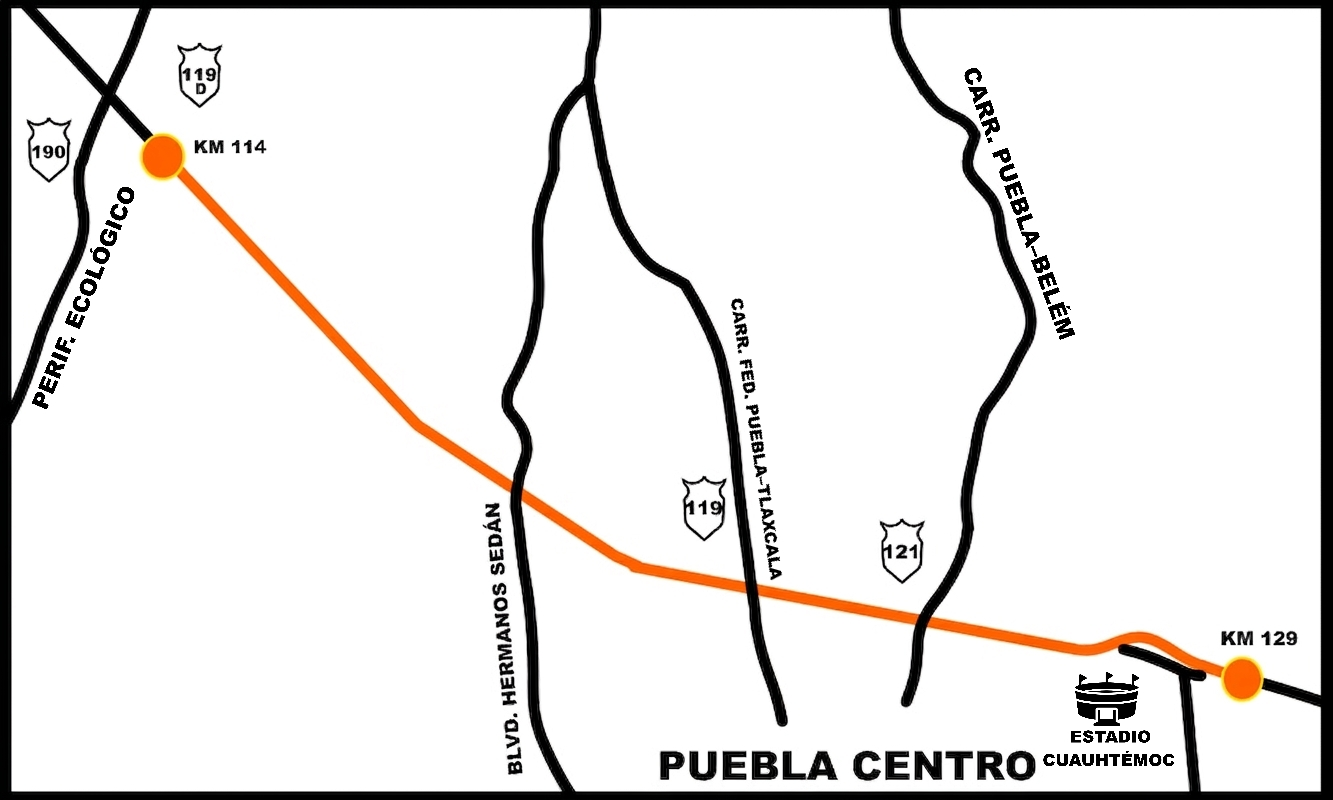
Map of the Puebla elevated viaduct with its various connections.

Starting at kilometer 115, the highway splits into two levels via the Puebla Elevated Viaduct (Spanish: Viaducto Elevado de Puebla), or the Puebla Elevated Bypass (Spanish: Libramiento Elevado de Puebla) popularly known as the segundo piso (second floor). Inaugurated in 2016, this 15.3-kilometer (9.5 mi) structure was designed to separate express transit from local Puebla traffic. The viaduct begins after the Anillo Periférico Ecológico interchange, passing the Volkswagen de México plant. It traverses the municipalities of Cuautlancingo and Puebla, ending near the Estadio Cuauhtémoc at kilometer 129.

== Tolls ==
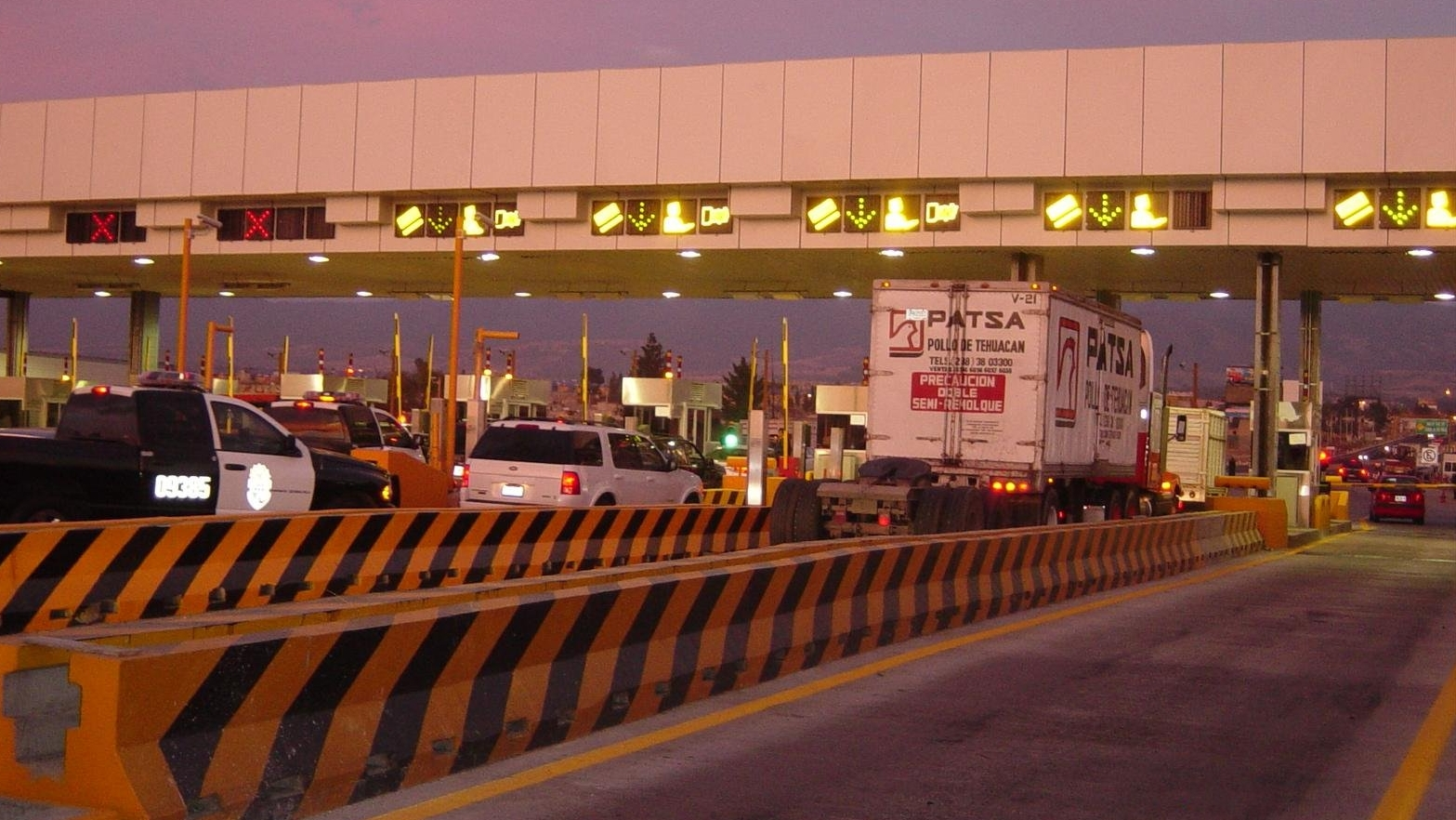
The San Marcos toll plaza at kilometer 33, near San Marcos Huixtoco

The highway has two main toll plazas, both operated by Caminos y Puentes Federales (CAPUFE). The first, San Marcos, is located at kilometer 33 and serves as the transition point between the Chalco Valley and the ascent into the Sierra Nevada mountain range. Due to its proximity to Mexico City, it experiences high traffic volume during peak hours and weekends. The toll for passenger cars is MX$173.

The second plaza, San Martín, is situated at kilometer 97. The toll for passenger cars at this location is MX$53.

== Safety and incidents ==
The Autopista México–Puebla is knows as the most dangerous roadways in Mexico, mostly because of traversal of the Trans-Mexican Volcanic Belt (Sierra Nevada). The high-altitude section near Río Frío de Juárez presents significant geographical and meteorological challenges, including steep continuous gradients, sharp curves, and frequent adverse weather conditions such as dense fog, rain, and occasionally freezing temperatures.

The westbound descent from the Sierra Nevada into the Chalco Valley is particularly notorious for high accident rates. The steep downgrade forces heavy cargo trucks to rely extensively on their braking systems for prolonged periods, leading to frequent brake failures. The stretch approaching the San Marcos toll plaza at kilometer 33 has been the site of numerous severe collisions, which is the reason why federal authorities have installed multiple runaway truck ramps along the route.

One of the deadliest incidents in the highway's history occurred on November 6, 2021. The brakes on a tractor-trailer transporting flammable chemical base liquids failed on the long descent and crashed at high speed into the San Marcos toll plaza and six passenger vehicles. The collision sparked a massive fire that completely engulfed the vehicles, resulting in 19 fatalities and several injuries. Following the disaster, federal authorities faced renewed public pressure to implement stricter mechanical inspections and speed controls for heavy transport vehicles operating on the steep downgrade.

== Junction list ==
State	Location	mi	km	Destinations	Notes
Mexico City	Iztapalapa	10.6	17	Zaragoza - Texcoco Interchange (La Concordia Interchange)	Western terminus; highway continues west as Calzada Ignacio Zaragoza.
Mexico City	Iztapalapa	12.4	20	La Virgen station	Elevated Trolleybus station.
Mexico City	Iztapalapa	14.3	23	Parque de la Mujer station	Elevated Trolleybus station.
Mexico City	Iztapalapa	16.2	26	Puente Rojo station	Elevated Trolleybus station.
Mexico City	Iztapalapa	16.8	27	Puente Blanco station	Elevated Trolleybus station.
State of Mexico	Valle de Chalco	19.9	32	Fed. 115 – Chalco, Cuautla	Connection via Federal Highway 115.
State of Mexico	Chalco	20.2	32.5	Circuito Exterior Mexiquense – Toluca, Querétaro	Outer toll bypass of Greater Mexico City.
State of Mexico	Chalco	20.5	33	San Marcos Toll Plaza	Main toll plaza.
State of Mexico	Ixtapaluca	22.4	36	Runaway truck ramp	Eastbound descent only.
State of Mexico	Ixtapaluca	24.2	39	Runaway truck ramp	Eastbound descent only.
State of Mexico	Ixtapaluca	29.2	47	Runaway truck ramp	Eastbound descent only.
State of Mexico	Ixtapaluca	31.7	51	Runaway truck ramp	Eastbound descent only.
State of Mexico	Ixtapaluca	34.8	56	Llano Grande	Local access to mountain park area.
State of Mexico	Ixtapaluca	39.1	63	Fed. 150 – Río Frío de Juárez	Connection via free Highway 150.
State of Mexico	Ixtapaluca	39.8	64	State of Mexico / Puebla border	Mountain summit boundary.
Puebla	Tlahuapan	42.3	68	El Pipirín	Local access.
Puebla	Tlahuapan	46.0	74	Santa Rita Tlahuapan	Municipal seat access.
Puebla	Tlahuapan	47.8	77	State road – San Rafael Ixtapalucan	Connection to free Highway 150.
Puebla	Tlahuapan	48.5	78	State road – San Antonio Chautla	Access to Ex-Hacienda de Chautla.
Puebla	San Martín Texmelucan	56.5	91	San Martín Texmelucan Interchange	Access to city center.
Puebla	San Martín Texmelucan	57.2	92	Fed. M40D (Arco Norte) / San Martín–Cholula road – Querétaro, Atlacomulco	Major bypass junction around Greater Mexico City.
Puebla	San Martín Texmelucan	60.3	97	San Martín Toll Plaza	Main toll plaza.
Puebla	Huejotzingo	60.9	98	State road – Santa Ana Xalmimilulco, San Miguel Xochitecatitla	Local connection.
Puebla	Huejotzingo	62.8	101	Puebla International Airport access road	Airport link.
Puebla	San Miguel Xoxtla	67.1	108	San Miguel Xoxtla Interchange	Access to industrial zones and Xoxtla center.
Puebla	Coronango	70.8	114	Anillo Periférico Ecológico / Fed. 119D – Tlaxcala	Puebla's outer ring road and toll connection to Puebla–Tlaxcala Highway.
Puebla	Puebla	71.5	115	Segundo Piso de Puebla	Western terminus of the elevated toll viaduct bypass.
Puebla	Puebla	72.7	117	Fed. 119 – Tlaxcala, Puebla Center	Exit via Av. Carmen Serdán / Blvd. Hermanos Serdán; access to CAPU bus terminal.
Puebla	Puebla	75.2	121	Fed. 121 – Santa Ana Chiautempan, Apizaco	Exit via Vía Corta a Tlaxcala; access to Central de Abasto.
Puebla	Puebla	78.3	126	Fed. 150 – Puebla Center, Orizaba	Distribuidor Ignacio Zaragoza; eastern terminus of the Autopista México-Puebla. Main line continues east as Autopista Puebla-Orizaba (Fed 150D).
1.000 mi = 1.609 km; 1.000 km = 0.621 mi Indicates toll road or toll collection point
