= Iztaccíhuatl–Popocatépetl National Park =

Mexican park in México, Puebla, and Morelos

- Parque Nacional Iztaccíhuatl-Popocatépetl
- IUCN category II (national park)
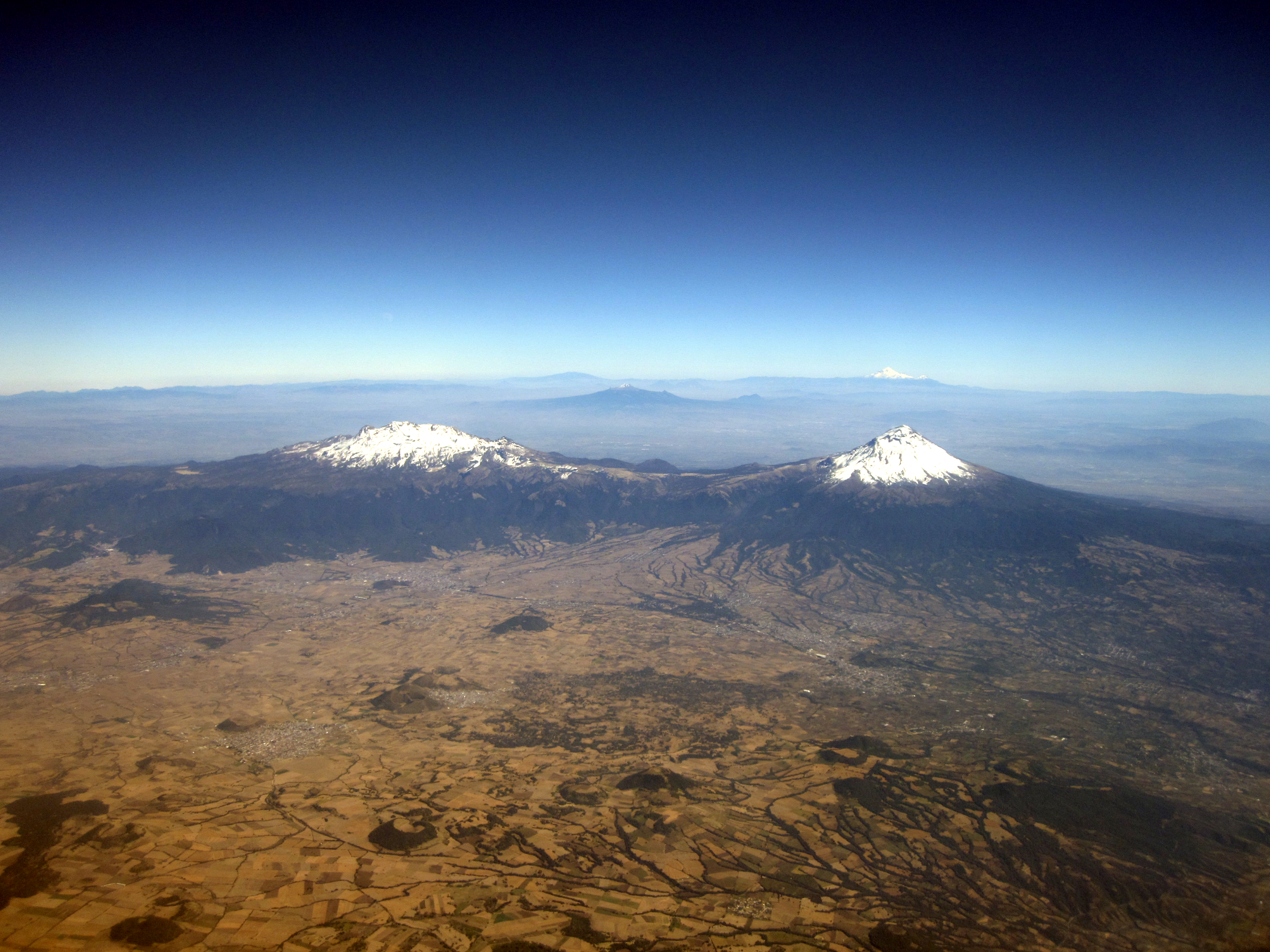
- Aerial view of Iztaccíhuatl (left) and Popocatépetl

- Location within Mexico Location within North America
- Location: México, Puebla, and Morelos, Mexico
- Nearest city: Mexico City
- Coordinates: 19°14′10″N 98°39′48″W
- Area: 39,819.08 ha (98,395.1 acres)
- Established: November 8, 1935
- Governing body: National Commission of Protected Natural Areas (CONANP)

Iztaccíhuatl–Popocatépetl National Park, also known as Izta-Popo Zoquiapan National Park, (Note: Also known in full as: "Iztaccíhuatl-Popocatépetl Zoquiapan National Park"; "Iztaccíhuatl-Popocatépetl National Park" (Spanish: Parque Nacional Iztaccíhuatl-Popocatépetl); "Iztaccíhuatl-Popocatépetl, Zoquiapan and Anexas National Park") is a national park in Mexico on the border of the states of México, Puebla, and Morelos. The park protects 39,819.08 hectares (98,395.1 acres), surrounding Mexico's second- and third-highest peaks, the Popocatépetl and Iztaccíhuatl volcanoes (respectively 5,426 m (17,802 ft) and 5,230 m (17,160 ft)) as well as the area of the Hacienda de Zoquiapán, and its annexed areas (anexas) of Zoquiapan, Ixtlahuacán, and the Frío de Juárez River.

== Geography ==
The park extends north and south, following a line of volcanic peaks.

Popocatépetl is the southernmost peak, the highest in the park at 5,426 m (17,802 ft), and the second-highest in Mexico. It is volcanically active, with the latest eruptive period extending from 2005 to the present. Iztaccíhuatl (5,230 m (17,160 ft)) is north of Popocatépetl, and together form a range known as the Sierra Nevada. The valley of Río Frío, where Mexican Federal Highway 150 between Mexico City and Puebla passes through the park, is the northern end of the Sierra Nevada.

The northern portion of the park covers the Sierra de Río Frío, made up of three volcanic peaks – Mount Tláloc at (4,120 m), Telapón (4060 m), and Papayo (3,600 m) Tláloc and Telapón, the northern and middle peaks, formed between 5 and 2 million years ago. Papayo, the southernmost peak in the Sierra de Río Frío, formed more recently.

Rain and snowfall and glacial melt give rise to many mountain streams. The northern and western slopes drain into Lake Texcoco in the Valley of Mexico. The eastern slopes drain into the upper Balsas River, also known as the Atoyac. The southernmost portion of the park is drained by the Cuautla and Nexapa rivers, which are tributaries of the Balsas. The Balsas empties southwards into the Pacific Ocean. The surface waters and groundwater from the park are important sources of fresh water for the Mexico City metropolitan area, to the west in the Valley of Mexico, and the cities of Puelbla and Tlaxcala to the east in the upper basin of the Balsas.

== Flora and fauna ==
The predominant plant communities in the park are montane conifer forests and alpine grasslands.

Conifer forests extend from the lower limits of the park up to 4000 meters elevation. These include pine-fir forests and pine forests. Pine-fir forests are found from 3000 to 3700 meters elevation. Characteristic trees are oyamel fir (Abies religiosa) and the pines Pinus ayacahuite, Pinus montezumae, and Pinus hartwegii. Pine forests grow between 3400 and 4000 meters elevation. Mexican mountain pine (Pinus hartwegii) is the predominant tree, with Ribes ciliatum, Lupinus montanus, Acaena elongata, and the grasses Festuca spp. and Calamagrostis spp. in the understory.

Alpine and sub-alpine grassland, known as Zacatonal, is found between 3500 and 4350 meters elevation. It consists of grasses and herbaceous plants with occasional woody junipers, growing no more than 50 cm high. Characteristic species include the grasses Festuca spp., Calamagrostis tolucensis, Muhlenbergia quadridentata, and Agrostis tolucensis, together with Juniperus monticola.

Areas above 4350 meters, which include the peaks of Popocatépetl and Iztaccíhuatl, are mostly barren rock and permanent ice and snow.

48 species of wild mammals have been recorded in the park, including bobcats (Lynx rufus) coyotes (Canis latrans), foxes, American badgers (Taxidea taxus berlandieri), skunks, racoons, bats, rabbits, gophers, squirrels, mice, and shrews. The endangered volcano rabbit (Romerolagus diazi) lives in high-elevation grasslands on four central Mexican volcanic peaks, including Iztaccíhuatl and Popocatépetl. Other limited-range species include the Orizaba long-tailed shrew (Sorex orizabae) and Phillips's kangaroo rat (Dipodomys phillipsii).

161 species of birds have been recorded in the park. 75% of the birds are resident, while the remaining 25% are migratory or occasional visitors. Resident birds include the red-tailed hawk (Buteo jamaicensis formosus), peregrine falcon (Falco peregrinus), long-tailed wood partridge (Dendrortyx macroura), white-naped swift (Streptoprocne semicollaris), Aztec thrush (Ridgwayia pinicola), Sierra Madre sparrow (Xenospiza baileyi), bumblebee hummingbird (Selasphorus heloisa), gray-barred wren (Campylorhynchus megalopterus), spotted wren (Campylorhynchus gularis), russet nightingale-thrush (Catharus occidentalis), rufous-backed thrush (Turdus rufopalliatus), ocellated thrasher (Toxostoma ocellatum), blue mockingbird (Melanotis caerulescens), and Striped sparrow (Oriturus superciliosus).

Native amphibians include the ridged tree frog (Dryophytes plicatus) and four salamanders – Pseudoeurycea leprosa, Pseudoeurycea cephalica, common splayfoot salamander (Chiropterotriton chiropterus), and mountain stream salamander (Ambystoma altamirani).

== History ==
Animation about the park created by the Pro Natura organization

A decree by President Lázaro Cárdenas on November 8, 1935 established a national park on Popocatépetl and Iztaccíhuatl. The decree established the park's lower boundary at the 3000-meter contour, excluding the town of Río Frío de Juárez. A second decree on 13 March, 1937 confirmed that the forest lands of the Hacienda of Zoquiapan, in what is now the northern part of the park, were included in the park.

On February 11, 1948, President Miguel Alemán Valdés issued a decree that reset the boundary of the park at the 3,600 meter contour, decreasing the park in size. The Mexican Government created an industrial unit for forest exploitation (Unidad Industrial de Explotación Forestal) to supply wood pulp to the San Rafael paper factory from trees harvested in the former park lands. A secretarial agreement abolished the unit on February 11, 1992.

The park is administered by the National Commission of Protected Natural Areas (CONANP), a federal agency of the Secretariat of Environment and Natural Resources.

The park was closed to the public from March 2020 to March 2021 because of the COVID-19 pandemic in Mexico.

== See also ==
- Popocatépetl and Iztaccíhuatl
- Leora's stream salamander
