= Mexican Federal Highway 145 =

Highway in Mexico

Federal Highway 145
- Carretera federal 145

Route information
- Maintained by Secretariat of Infrastructure, Communications and Transportation
- Length: 215.4 km (133.8 mi)

Major junctions
- West end: Fed. 150 in La Tinaja
- East end: Fed. 185 in Sayula

Location
- Country: Mexico
- State: Veracruz

Highway system
- Mexican Federal Highways; List; Autopistas
← Fed. 144	→ Fed. 147

Federal Highway 145 (Carretera Federal 145) is a Federal Highway of Mexico. The highway travels from La Tinaja, Veracruz in the north to Sayula, Veracruz in the south.

== Major intersections ==
State	Municipality	Location	km	mi	Destinations	Notes
Veracruz	Cotaxtla	La Tinaja			Fed. 150 – Córdoba, Veracruz	Western terminus
Veracruz	Tierra Blanca	Rodríguez Tejeda			SH 95 – Joachín	
Veracruz	Tres Valles	La Granja			SH 145 – Temascal	
Veracruz	Cosamaloapan de Carpio	Gabino Barreda			Fed. 175 – San Juan Bautista Tuxtepec	
Papaloapan River					Bridge	
Oaxaca	San Juan Bautista Tuxtepec	No major junctions				
Oaxaca	Loma Bonita	No major junctions				
Veracruz	Chacaltianguis	No major junctions				
Veracruz	José Azueta	No major junctions				
Veracruz	Isla				Fed. 179 – Isla, Santiago Tuxtla	
Veracruz	Juan Rodríguez Clara	No major junctions				
Veracruz	San Juan Evangelista	No major junctions				
Veracruz	Sayula de Alemán				Salina Cruz, Coatzacoalcos	Interchange; right turns only
Veracruz	Sayula de Alemán	Sayula de Alemán			Fed. 185 – Salina Cruz, Coatzacoalcos	
1.000 mi = 1.609 km; 1.000 km = 0.621 mi: Incomplete access
