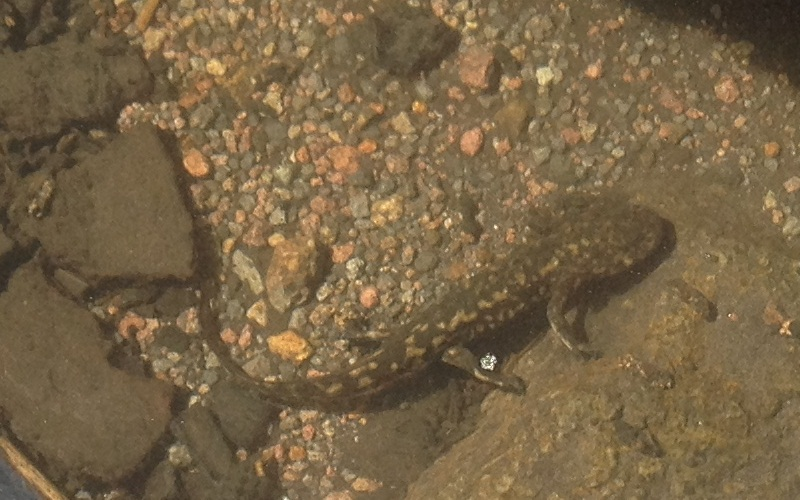

Conservation status
- Critically Endangered (IUCN 3.1)

Scientific classification
- Kingdom: Animalia
- Phylum: Chordata
- Class: Amphibia
- Order: Urodela
- Family: Ambystomatidae
- Genus: Ambystoma
- Species: A. leorae

Binomial name
- Ambystoma leorae Taylor, 1943

Synonyms
- Rhyacosiredon leorae

= Leora's stream salamander =

Species of amphibian

The Leora's stream salamander or ajolote (Ambystoma leorae) is a rare species of mole salamander in the family Ambystomatidae. It is endemic to a very small area of land in the Iztaccihuatl-Popocatepetl National Park on the border of the State of Mexico with Puebla, with a single known population on Mount Tlaloc. Its very specific requirements as regards water quality militates against its survival in a habitat where water is being extracted, cattle graze and the salamander has traditionally been eaten as food. It has been listed as a threatened species by the Mexican Government and as "critically endangered" by the International Union for Conservation of Nature.

== Name ==
Named after Leora T. Hughes, the wife of an amateur herpetologist Dyfrig McHattie Forbes, who collected the holotype.

== Distribution ==
This species is endemic to the Sierra Nevada in central Mexico. It was historically restricted to six locations in the Iztaccihuatl-Popocatepetl National Park (IPNP) located on the border of the State of Mexico with Puebla. Long ago it disappeared from the heavily polluted Rio Frio where it was first found. A recent research rediscovered a new and relict locality of A. leorae, possibly the last one. The new study reports that the critically endangered species persists in a single population on Mount Tlaloc, located adjacent to Mexico City, one of the largest and most densely urbanized area on earth.

== Habitat ==
The salamanders were found in two small streams (2 m wide, 6.5 m depth) with cold water temperature (12 to 15 °C), highly elevated oxygenation water level (78% dissolved oxygen) surrounded by small alpine grassland (Muhlenbergia sp.) and mountain forest (Pinus hartwegii and Abies religiosa). The study show low genetic diversity but high average heterozygosity, and three genetic subpopulations were recognized in the restricted geographic range.

== Conservation status ==
Because of the species limited distribution, the clearance of the forest, and the pollution and consumption of the water by humans, it is classified by the IUCN as a critically endangered species and as a threatened species by the Mexican government. In the geographic distribution of the species, there are several threats that are modifying the ecosystem, including alteration of the stream to collect the water for human consumption, introduction of cattle, and the direct collection of specimens for traditional food.
