= Mexican Federal Highway 150D =

Toll highway in Mexico

Federal Highway 150D
- Carretera federal 150D
- Autopista México-Puebla; Autopista Puebla-Cordoba; Autopista Córdoba-Veracruz

Route information
- Maintained by Caminos y Puentes Federales (except Puebla second level)
- Length: 397.77 km (247.16 mi)
- Existed: May 5, 1962–present

Major junctions
- West end: Av. Río Churubusco and Calzada General Ignacio Zaragoza in Mexico City
- Fed. 190 in Mexico City; Fed. 115 in Ixtapaluca, State of Mexico; Fed. 57D in Ixtapaluca; Fed. 117 in San Martín Texmelucan, Puebla; Fed. 57D / Fed. M40D in San Martín Texmelucan; Fed. 119 in Puebla, Puebla; Fed. 121 in Puebla, Puebla; Fed. 150 in Puebla, Puebla; Fed. 140D in Puebla, Puebla; Fed. 129 in Amozoc, Puebla; Fed. 140 in Acatzingo, Puebla; Fed. 135D near Cuacnopalan, Puebla; Fed. 144 near Esperanza, Puebla; Fed. 145D in La Tinaja, Veracruz; Fed. 180 northwest of Paso del Toro, Veracruz
- East end: Fed. 140 at Veracruz City

Location
- Country: Mexico

Highway system
- Mexican Federal Highways; List; Autopistas

Federal Highway 150D is a toll highway connecting Mexico City to the port of Veracruz via the cities of Puebla and Córdoba. It serves as one of the backbones of Mexico's toll road system. The road is primarily operated by Caminos y Puentes Federales, which charges cars 520 pesos to travel Highway 150D, with one segment in the Puebla metropolitan area built and maintained by OHL and PINFRA.

== History ==
Highway 150D from Mexico City to Puebla was formally opened on May 5, 1962, coinciding with the centennial of the Battle of Puebla.

The Puebla second deck was opened in 2016, costing 10.5 billion pesos; the lower level is to be converted into a state-operated road with traffic lights.

== Route description ==
=== Mexico City ===
In Mexico City, Highway 150D begins at the intersection of Avenida Río Churubusco and Calzada General Ignacio Zaragoza, proceeding southeast as the middle lanes of the latter thoroughfare, soon spawning its first federal highway, Mexican Federal Highway 190, which is the non-toll road to Puebla and eventually toward Chiapas. From this point southeast, Highway 150D serves as the boundary between Mexico City and the State of Mexico until it enters the latter completely at its interchange with Avenida Concepción, entering Valle de Chalco Municipality.

=== State of Mexico ===
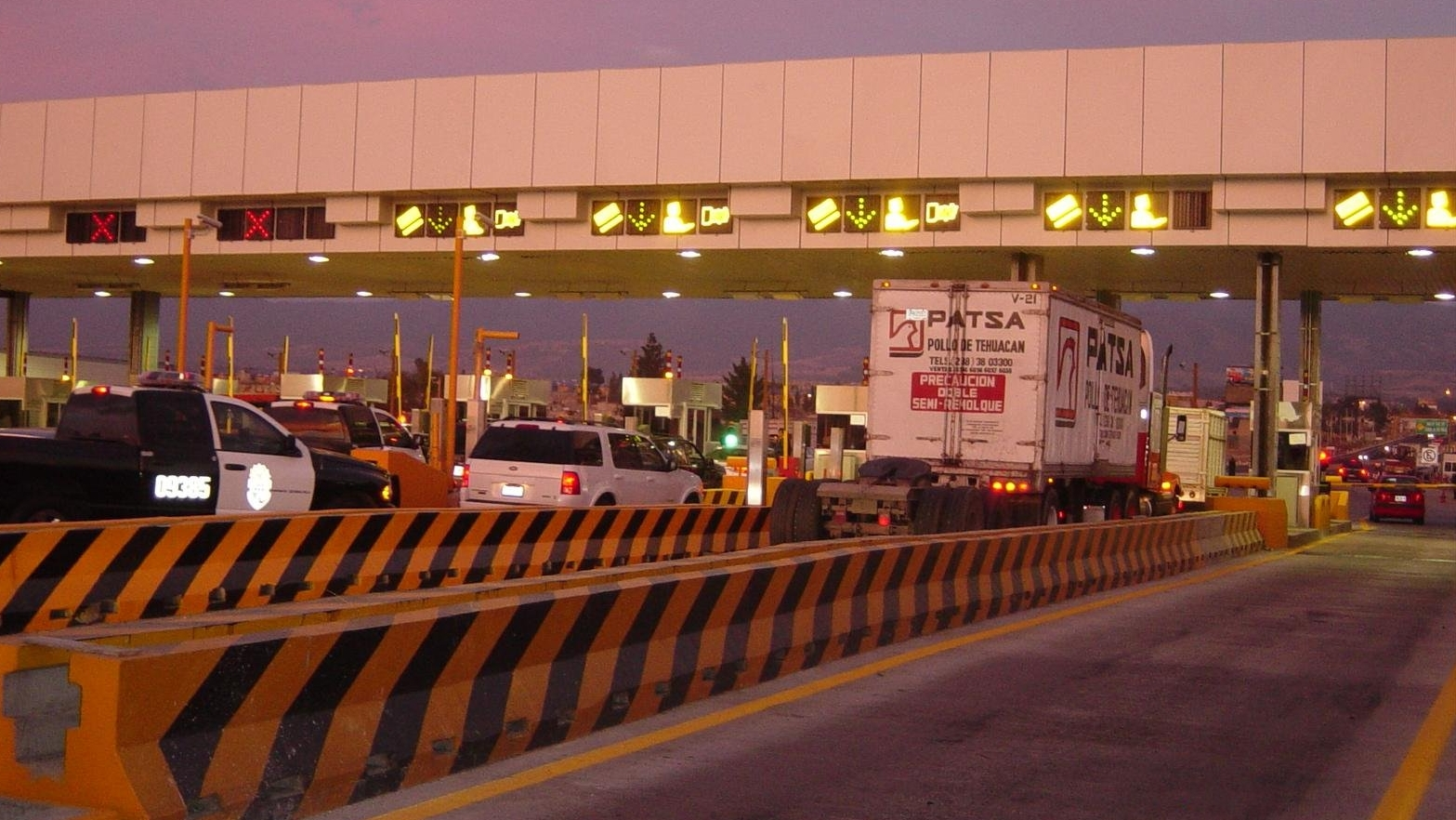
The San Marcos toll booth

Highway 150D bends east near Cerro del Elefante and comes to two consecutive major interchanges in Ixtapaluca, Highway 115 at the Distribuidor Vial Ixtapaluca followed by the Circuito Exterior Mexiquense. The former was dedicated in 2014 after two and a half years of construction with a final cost of 1.3 billion pesos. This area is home to a large concentration of commercial retail, including two shopping malls. Immediately after the Circuito Exterior Mexiquense is the highway's first toll booth, San Marcos. The terrain rises east of Ixtapaluca and, just after its interchange serving Río Frío de Juárez, Highway 150D enters the state of Puebla.

=== Puebla and Tlaxcala ===
Highways 190 and 150D parallel each other roughly in this area. The next major city on Highway 150D is San Martín Texmelucan, where Highway 150D intersects Highway 117 into the city and serves as the eastern terminus of the Arco Norte toll road that serves as the outermost ring of Mexico City. After proceeding south east and briefly crossing into Tlaxcala, Highway 150D enters the Puebla metropolitan area, serving as both termini of the Puebla beltway, signed as Highway 190, and intersecting Highways 119 and 121 toward Tlaxcala. Additionally, it serves as the western terminus of Highway 150, which roughly follows the remainder of its route to Veracruz, and as the southern terminus of the Puebla-Tlaxcala highway, built by PINFRA. For 13.3 kilometres (8.3 mi) in Puebla, the highway spawns a second level; this segment, not operated by CAPUFE, costs 55 pesos and was Mexico's most expensive toll road upon opening, with a cost per kilometer of 3.59 pesos. The addition of one more toll prompted at least one newspaper columnist to warn motorists "not to be scammed".

East of the Puebla beltway, it intersects two more major highways. Highway 140D connects Puebla to Xalapa, the capital of the state of Veracruz, while Highway 129 offers access to Amozoc de Mota, Teziutlán and Tlapacoyan and Martínez de la Torre in Veracruz. Further southeast, Highway 150D provides access to Highway 140 to Acatzingo, Highway 135D to Tehuacán and Oaxaca, and Highway 144 at Esperanza.

=== Veracruz ===
Highway 150D enters rugged terrain in western Veracruz, passing through Cañón del Río Blanco National Park. The two directions of the highway cross over each other twice. This stretch is considered one of the most dangerous in the country; in 2010, one lane of the highway had to be closed for six months due to a rock slide, and CAPUFE ranked it second in the country for accidents in 2011. East of the interchange at Maltrata, Highway 150D straightens out and enters the area of Ciudad Mendoza, Nogales, Orizaba and Córdoba. It also intersects Highway 150, which swoops down to Tehuacán, for the first time since the city of Puebla.

East of Córdoba, the terrain flattens out and Highway 150D proceeds toward the east. At La Tinaja, it comes across one more major additional interchange, with Highway 145D. Highway 145D connects central Veracruz to Minatitlán in the south. Following this interchange, Highway 150D turns northeast and heads for the port of Veracruz. It meets Highway 180 northwest of Paso del Toro, which gives its name to the last toll booth on the road. The toll road ends on the edge of the Veracruz metropolitan area, at Federal Highway 140. Traffic continues northbound onto Avenida Miguel Alemán, a major thoroughfare in the city of Veracruz.

== Tolls ==
CAPUFE and the SCT divide Highway 150D into five segments:

- Mexico-Puebla, 141 pesos for 124.9 kilometres (77.6 mi)
- Puebla-Acatzingo, 58 pesos for 47.1 kilometres (29.3 mi)
- Acatzingo-Ciudad Mendoza, 116 pesos for 95.3 kilometres (59.2 mi)
- Ciudad Mendoza-Córdoba, 26 pesos for 32.47 kilometres (20.18 mi)
- Córdoba-Veracruz, 179 pesos for 98 kilometres (61 mi)

Additionally, users of the second level in Puebla must pay a toll of 55 pesos, the only tolled segment not operated by CAPUFE.
