= Mexican Federal Highway 135D =

Toll highway in Mexico

Federal Highway 135D
- Carretera federal 135D
- Autopista Cuacnopalan-Oaxaca

Route information
- Maintained by Caminos y Puentes Federales
- Length: 228.1 km (141.7 mi)
- Existed: November 29, 1994–present

Major junctions
- West end: Fed. 150D at Cuacnopalan, Puebla
- Fed. 150 in Tehuacán, Puebla; Fed. 125 in Tehuacán, Puebla; Fed. 190 in Asunción Nochixtlán, Oaxaca; Fed. 190 in Telixtlahuaca, Oaxaca
- East end: Fed. 190 northwest of Oaxaca, Oaxaca

Location
- Country: Mexico

Highway system
- Mexican Federal Highways; List; Autopistas

Federal Highway 135D is a toll highway connecting Cuacnopalan, Puebla to Oaxaca City and bypassing Tehuacán, Puebla. The road is operated by Caminos y Puentes Federales, which charges a toll of 200 pesos per car to travel Highway 135D.

== Route description ==
Highway 135D begins at an interchange with Highway 150D at Cuacnopalan, proceeding southward as the primary bypass of Tehuacán. Travelers can enter the city via interchanges with Highways 150 and 125. Past Tehuacán, there are few towns on the road, with the primary highlights being access to Asunción Nochixtlán, Oaxaca, and the toll road's end northwest of Oaxaca City.
