= Mexican Federal Highway 131 =

Highway in Mexico

Federal Highway 131
- Carretera federal 131

Route information
- Maintained by Secretariat of Infrastructure, Communications and Transportation

Puebla-Veracruz
- Length: 49.1 km (30.5 mi)
- North end: Fed. 129 in Teziutlán
- South end: Fed. 140 in Perote

Oaxaca
- Length: 248 km (154 mi)
- North end: Fed. 175 south of Oaxaca
- South end: Fed. 200 in Puerto Escondido

Location
- Country: Mexico

Highway system
- Mexican Federal Highways; List; Autopistas
← Fed. 130	→ Fed. 132

Federal Highway 131 (Carretera Federal 131) is a Federal Highway of Mexico. Federal Highway 131 is split into two segments: the first segment travels from Teziutlán, Puebla in the north to Perote, Veracruz in the south. The second segment, entirely within Oaxaca, travels from south of Oaxaca de Juárez in the north to Puerto Escondido in the south.
