= Mexican Federal Highway 145D =

Toll highway in Mexico

Federal Highway 145D
- Carretera federal 145D
- Autopista La Tinaja-Cosoleacaque

Route information
- Maintained by Caminos y Puentes Federales
- Length: 228.1 km (141.7 mi)

Major junctions
- West end: Fed. 150D at La Tinaja
- VER 185 at Cosamaloapan; Fed. 179 north of Ciudad Isla; Fed. 185 near Acayucan
- East end: Fed. 185 / Fed. 180D in Cosoleacaque

Location
- Country: Mexico
- State: Veracruz

Highway system
- Mexican Federal Highways; List; Autopistas

Federal Highway 145D is a toll highway in the state of Veracruz. It connects southern Veracruz to Mexican Federal Highway 150D, continuing the other road's east-west trajectory. The road is operated by Caminos y Puentes Federales, which charges a toll of 183 pesos per car to travel Highway 145D.

== Route description ==
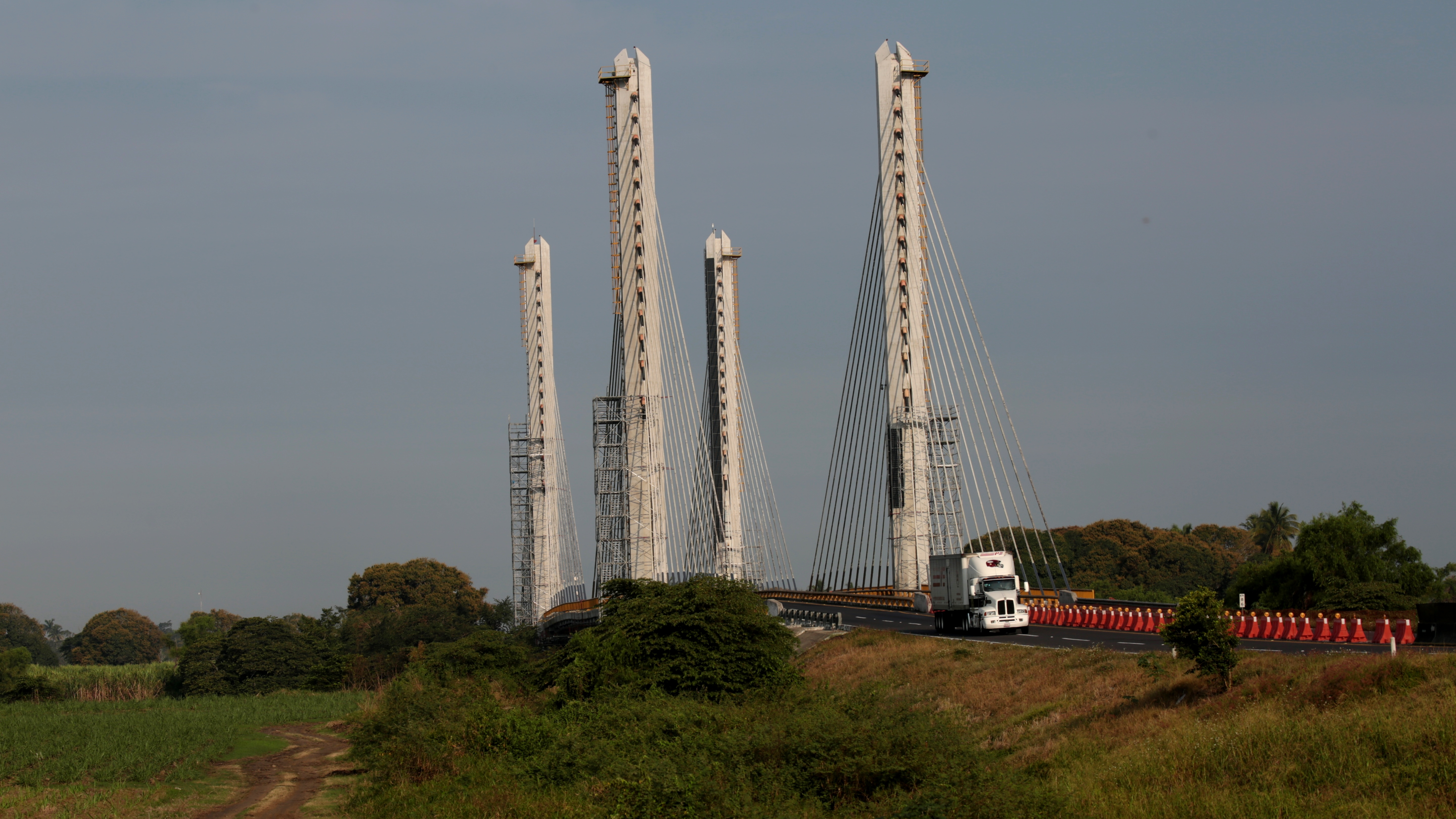
The Highway 145D bridge over the Papaloapan River

Highway 145D begins at an interchange with Highway 150D at La Tinaja, facilitating access to the port of Veracruz or further down Highway 150D toward Puebla and Mexico City. From there, the road heads southeast. At an interchange in Cosamaloapan, travelers encounter one of the highway's two toll plazas; the other is located at Acayucan, where it meets Highway 185. The route designation ends at the interchange with Mexican Federal Highway 185 serving Cosoleacaque and Minatitlán.

The 34 kilometres (21 mi) Cosoleacaque-Nuevo Teapa stretch of Highway 180D continues the west-east routing past Minatitlán and the Coatzacoalcos River toward Nuevo Teapa.

== History ==
Grupo Mexicano de Desarrollo built the highway and operated it until 1998.
