= Mexican Federal Highway 132 =

Highway in Mexico

Federal Highway 132
- Carretera federal 132

Route information
- Maintained by Secretariat of Infrastructure, Communications and Transportation
- Length: 84.08 km (52.24 mi)

Major junctions
- East end: Fed. 130 west of Tulancingo, Hidalgo.
- West end: Fed. 85 in Ecatepec de Morelos

Location
- Country: Mexico

Highway system
- Mexican Federal Highways; List; Autopistas
← Fed. 131	→ Fed. 134

Federal Highway 132 (Carretera Federal 132) connects Ecatepec de Morelos, State of Mexico in the west to Tulancingo, Hidalgo in the east.
