= XHTBV-FM =

Radio station in Tierra Blanca, Veracruz

- Tierra Blanca, Veracruz; Mexico
- Frequency: 100.9 FM
- Branding: La Bestia Grupera

Programming
- Format: Grupera

Ownership
- Owner: Radiorama; (XETBV-AM, S.A. de C.V.)
- Operator: Grupo Audiorama Comunicaciones

History
- First air date: July 6, 1994 (concession)
- Call sign meaning: Tierra Blanca Veracruz

Technical information
- ERP: 6 kW
- Transmitter coordinates: 18°26′22″N 96°20′38″W

Links
- Website: audiorama.mx

XHTBV-FM is a radio station on 100.9 FM in Tierra Blanca, Veracruz. It is owned by Grupo Radiorama, It is operated by Grupo Audiorama Comunicaciones and carries its grupera format known as La Bestia Grupera.

== History ==
XETBV-AM 1580 received its concession on July 6, 1994. It was a 250-watt daytimer. XETBV later moved to 1260 kHz.

XETBV moved to FM in 2010.
