= Anillo Periférico Ecológico =

Highway in Mexico

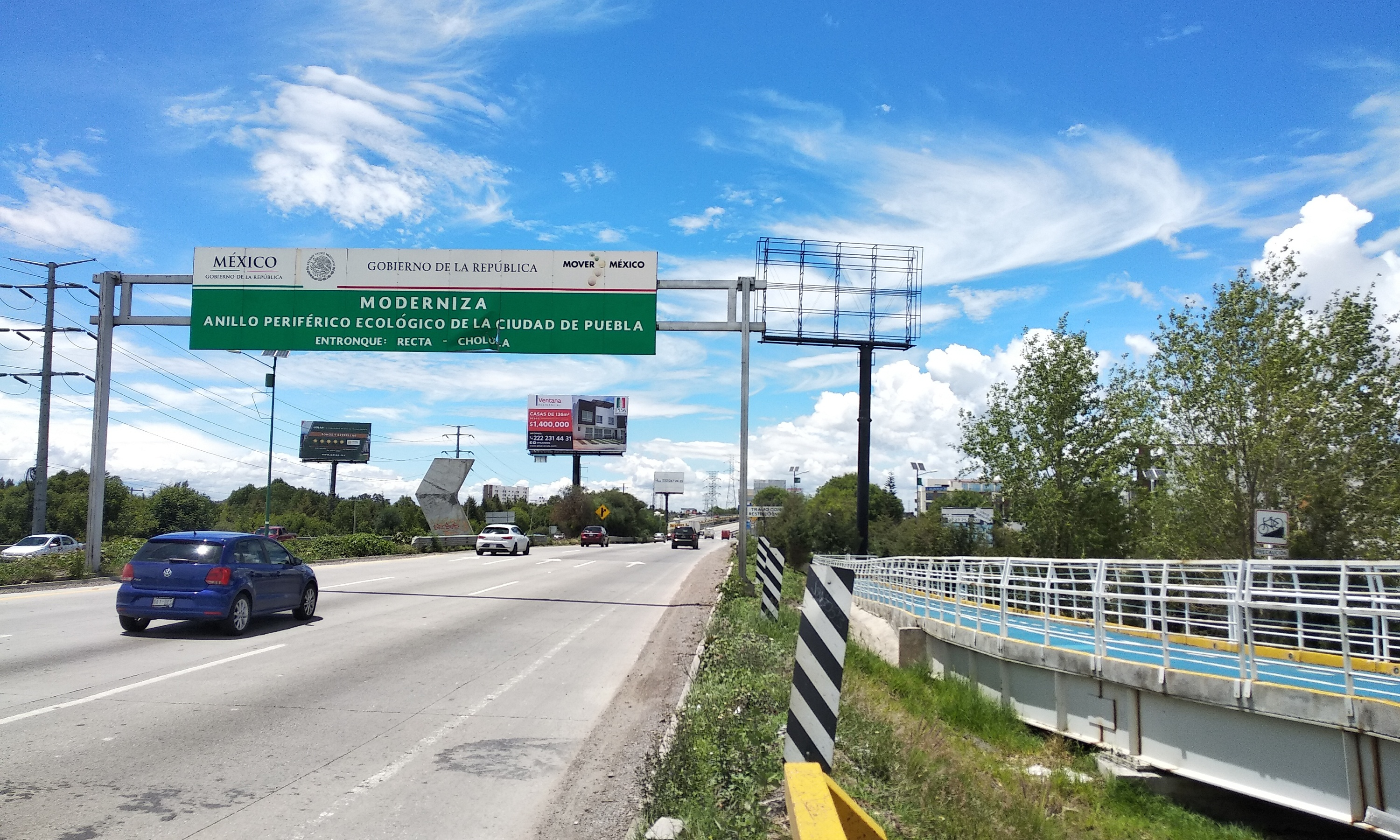
- The Periférico Ecológico between the junctions of Camino Real a Cholula and Recta a Cholula

Route information
- Length: 40 km (25 mi)

Location
- Country: Mexico

Highway system
- Mexican Federal Highways; List; Autopistas

The Anillo Periférico Ecológico is a ring road of the city of Puebla, in Mexico. It is an arm from Mexican Federal Highway 190 (Mexico-Amozoc) that allows to surround a large part of the metropolitan area of Puebla. With an approximate length of 40 km, it forms an arc that is linked to highway 150D (Mexico-Veracruz) by two junctions, respectively at the extreme northwest and east of the urban area, surrounding it to the south.

== History ==
Anillo Periférico Ecológico was conceived in 1993 as part of the Angelopolis Regional Development Plan. This planned to grow and modernize the city, as well as speed up vehicular flow through a fast track that would connect the Mexico-Veracruz highway with the south from the city, freeing it from passing traffic.

In a first phase, the Periférico Ecológico was inaugurated in 1997, during the government of Manuel Bartlett. It initially included the western and southern section, from Highway 150D at the height of San Francisco Ocotlán to José María Lafragua Avenue / Prolongation 24 South. Successive expansions extended it to the east, first to Boulevard Valsequillo, then to Mexican Federal Highway 150 (Puebla-Antón Lizardo), and finally to the intersection with Highway 150D at Chachapa. Currently, it has six lanes (three in each direction) for almost its entire length. However, in the past it only had four lanes without boundaries as it passed through the west of the city.
