= Los Volcanes Biosphere Reserve =

UNESCO protected area in Mexico

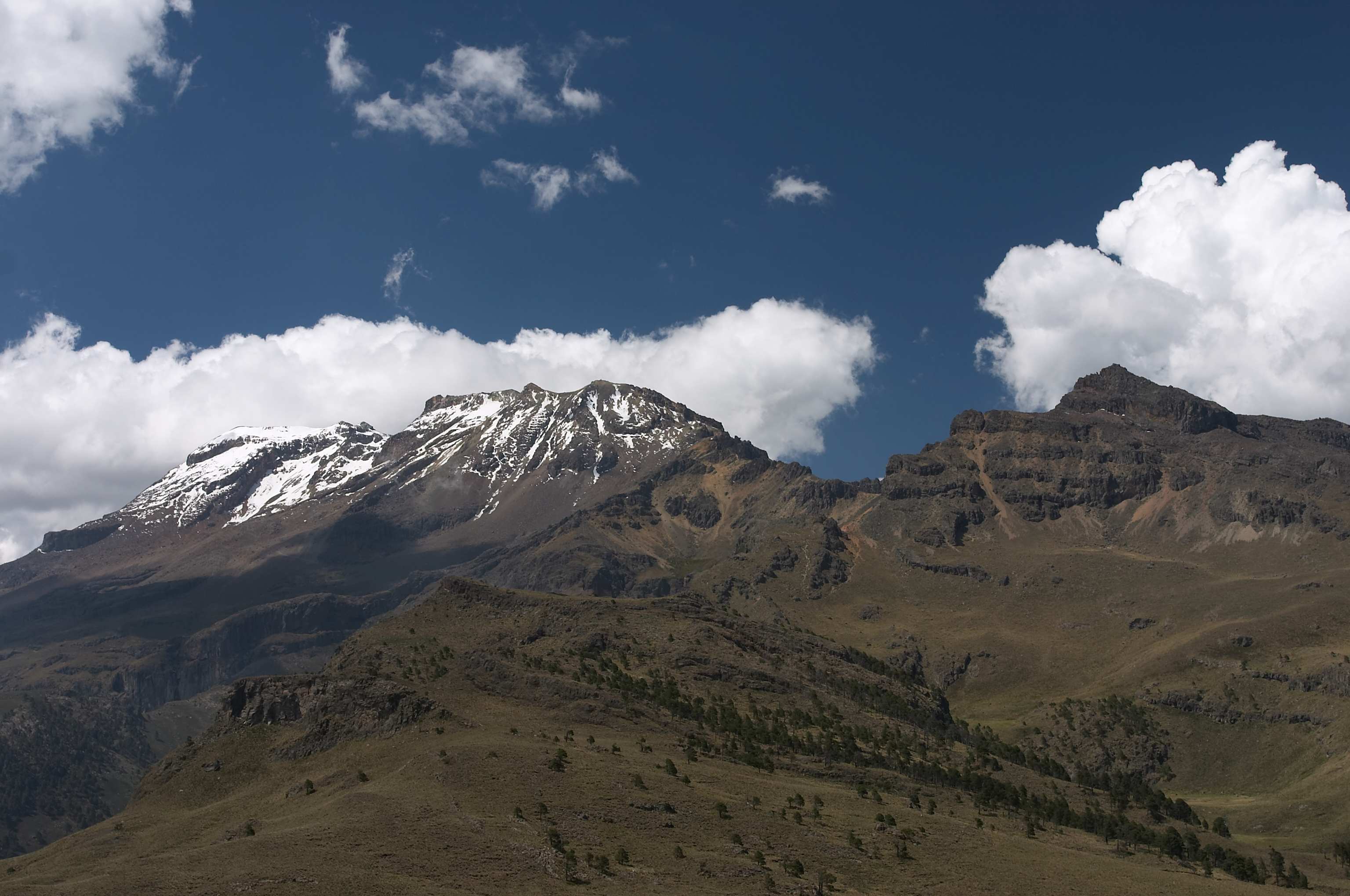
- Iztaccihuatl volcano

- Location within Mexico
- Location: Mexico
- Coordinates: 19°33′34.920″N 98°39′32.760″W
- Area: 171,774.4 hectares (663.225 sq mi)
- Established: 2010
- Governing body: Izta-Popo Zoquiapan National Park

Los Volcanes Biosphere Reserve (established 2010) is a UNESCO Biosphere Reserve located within the Trans-Mexican Volcanic Belt of south-central Mexico. The 171,774.4 hectares (663.225 sq mi) reserve surrounds the volcanoes of Popocatépetl and Ixtaccíhuatl and marks the biogeographical boundary between the Nearctic and Neotropical realms. The reserve is managed by Iztaccíhuatl Popocatépetl Zoquiapan National Park.

== Ecology ==
The altitude of Los Volcanes varies between 2,589 metres (8,494 ft) above sea level and 5,452 metres (17,887 ft) above sea level. There is a very marked ecosystem gradient deriving from the variations in altitude, favoring enormous specific wealth and the presence of endemic species. Its diverse ecosystems consist of the pine and sacred fir (Abies religiosa, Oyamel in Nahuatl) of the Trans-Mexican Volcanic Belt pine-oak forests as well as high-mountain prairies. Its geological formations (hills, volcanic cones and slopes) are of volcanic origin with a predomination of basalt and andesitic rocks.

== Human activities ==
Within the reserve, the core zone comes under federal jurisdiction, the buffer zone under each State’s land planning and a combination of ejido, communal and small landowners. The transition zone is the property of the ejidos, communities and small landowners.

The transition zone is the only part with human settlements, including 31,480 inhabitants and land given over to farming, stock-raising, forestry, harvesting or other uses. The Ecological Planning Programme for Popocatépetl volcano and its Area of Influence covers a surface area of approximately 28,319,253 hectares (109,341.25 sq mi) involving 34 municipalities in three states, namely: Ixtapaluca, Tlalmanalco, Cocotitlán, Temamatla, Tenango del Aire, Ayapango, Amecameca, Ozumba, Tepetlixpa, Atlautla and Ecatzingo, in the State of Mexico; Acteopan, Atlixco, Atzizihuacan, Calpan, Cohuecan, Chiautzingo, San Nicolás de los Ranchos, San Salvador El Verde, Santa Isabel Cholula, Tianguismanalco, Tlahuapan, Tochimilco, Domingo Arenas, Huaquechula, Huejotzingo, Nealtican, San Felipe Teotlancingo and San Jerónimo Tecuinapan, in the State of Puebla; Ocuituco, Temoac, Tetela del Volcán, Yecapixtla and Zacualpan de Amilpas in the State of Morelos.

== Sources ==
This article incorporates text from a free content work (license statement/permission). Text taken from UNESCO - MAB Biosphere Reserves Directory, UNESCO, UNESCO.
