= Periférico =

A periférico is a ring road in the Spanish-speaking world.

Periférico may also refer to:

- Anillo Periférico, a beltway in Mexico City
- Anillo Periférico Ecológico, a beltway in Puebla, Mexico
- Periférico (Mexibús), a BRT station in Tlalnepantla, Mexico
- Periférico (Mexicable), an aerial lift station in Tlalnepantla, Mexico
- Periférico/Participación Ciudadana railway station, a light rail station in Tlalpan, Mexico City
- Periférico Belenes railway station, in Zapopan, Jalisco
- Periférico Norte railway station, in Zapopan, Jalisco
- Periférico Oriente metro station, in Tláhuac, Mexico City
- Periférico Sur, a station in Tlaquepaque, Jalisco, on Line 1 of the Guadalajara light rail system
