= Mexican Federal Highway 140D =

Toll highway in Mexico

Federal Highway 140D
- Carretera federal 140D
- Autopista Amozoc-Perote, Libramiento de Perote, Autopista Perote-Banderilla, Libramiento de Xalapa, Libramiento de Plan del Río, Xalapa Veracruz Via Corta

Route information
- Maintained by Secretariat of Infrastructure, Communications and Transportation

Major junctions
- West end: Fed. 150D at Puebla City
- Fed. 136 at Zitlaltepec, Tlaxcala; Fed. 129 near Libres, Puebla; Fed. 129D near Libres, Puebla; Fed. 140 east of Xalapa, Veracruz (partial overlap) Fed. 140 east of Plan del Río, Veracruz Fed. 180North of La Antigua, Veracruz
- East end: Fed. 180 North of Veracruz, Veracruz

Location
- Country: Mexico

Highway system
- Mexican Federal Highways; List; Autopistas

Federal Highway 140D (La Carretera Federal 14d) is a toll (cuota) part of the federal highways corridors (los corredores carreteros federales) that connects Puebla City to Veracruz.

== Route description ==
Fed. 140D begins east of Puebla City near Amozoc de Mota and proceeds northeast through Puebla and Tlaxcala, with notable interchanges at Zitlaltepec, Cuapiaxtla, Libres and Tepeyahualco; this segment was built by OHL and costs 127 pesos to travel in its entirety. It enters Veracruz near Perote, after which maintenance is taken over by Copexa. Copexa charges a toll of 139 pesos per car for the segment between Perote and Banderilla, which passes through Las Vigas de Ramírez, and another 139 pesos for the following segment, the Libramiento de Xalapa, which bypasses the city altogether. For a short portion east of Xalapa, Fed. 140D and Fed. 140 share the same routing, though Fed. 140D returns to bypass Plan del Río, a tolled 12-kilometre (7.5 mi) segment that charges users 40 pesos and is operated by Concesiones y Promociones Malibrán, S.A. de C.V.
