= Mexican Federal Highway 147 =

Highway in Mexico

Federal Highway 147
- Carretera federal 147

Route information
- Maintained by Secretariat of Infrastructure, Communications and Transportation
- Length: 175 km (109 mi)

Major junctions
- North end: Fed. 175 south of Tuxtepec
- South end: Fed. 185 in Palomares

Location
- Country: Mexico
- State: Oaxaca

Highway system
- Mexican Federal Highways; List; Autopistas
← Fed. 145	→ Fed. 150

Federal Highway 147 (Carretera Federal 147) is a Federal Highway of Mexico. The highway travels from south of Tuxtepec, Oaxaca in the northwest to Palomares, Oaxaca in the southeast.
