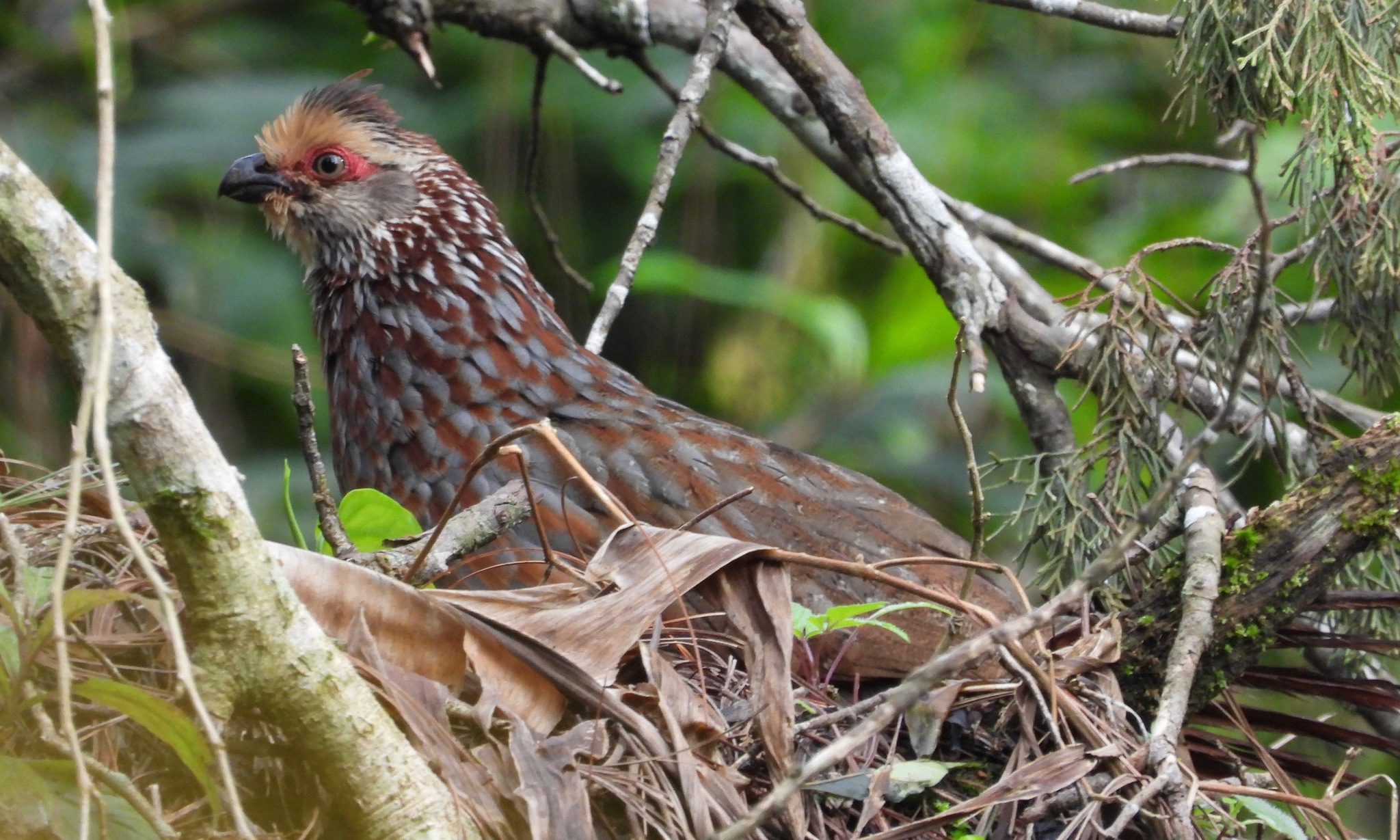

Conservation status
- Least Concern (IUCN 3.1)

Scientific classification
- Kingdom: Animalia
- Phylum: Chordata
- Class: Aves
- Order: Galliformes
- Family: Odontophoridae
- Genus: Dendrortyx
- Species: D. leucophrys

Binomial name
- Dendrortyx leucophrys (Gould, 1844)

= Buffy-crowned wood partridge =

Species of bird

The buffy-crowned wood partridge (Dendrortyx leucophrys) is a bird species in the family Odontophoridae, the New World quail. It is found in Mexico, Guatemala, Honduras, El Salvador, Costa Rica and Nicaragua.

== Taxonomy and systematics ==
The holotype of the buffy-crowned wood partridge was collected in Cobán, Guatemala, in June 1843 by Adolphe Delattre and given the binomial Ortyx leucophrys. It was originally in the collection of the 13th Earl of Derby who bequeathed it to the people of Liverpool in 1851. It is housed in the World Museum of the National Museums Liverpool with accession number D1496.

The buffy-crowned wood partridge shares the genus Dendrortyx with two other species, all of which appear to be quite distinct from each other. It has two subspecies, the nominate Dendrortyx leucophrys leucophrys and D. l. hypospodius. The latter has sometimes been considered a separate species. The members of D. l. leucophrys in Honduras and Nicaragua were previously treated as another subspecies.

== Description ==
The buffy-crowned wood partridge is 28 to 35.5 cm (11.0 to 14.0 in) long. Males weigh an estimated 397 g (14.0 oz) and females an estimated 340 g (12 oz). The nominate subspecies' forehead, supercilium, chin, and throat are white. It has a patch of bare red skin around the eye. The crown, its short crest, and the nape are chestnut and the back, wings, and tail are chesnut and gray. The belly is blue-gray with chestnut streaks. D. l. hypospodius is larger, darker, and grayer. The stripes on the breast are very dark and much narrower.

== Distribution and habitat ==
The buffy-crowned wood partridge is found in three separate areas. The nominate subspecies is found from Chiapas in southern Mexico into western Guatemala and in Honduras, El Salvador, northwestern Nicaragua, and far eastern Guatemala. D. l. hypospodius is found in central Costa Rica. The species inhabits several humid to semi-humid montane forest types including oak-pine, evergreen, and cloudforest. It can be found in secondary forest, partially logged areas, and coffee plantations.

== Behavior ==
=== Feeding ===
The buffy-crowned wood partridge apparently forages by scratching through leaf litter. Its diet has not been well studied but includes seeds, buds, small fruits, and invertebrates. It moves about in family groups of four to six and in the non-breeding season in coveys of up to 12.

=== Breeding ===
The buffy-crowned wood partridge's nesting season appears to span from February to June. It generally nests on the ground, either building a domed structure or hollowing out a space in dense grasses. The clutch size is six to seven.

=== Vocalization ===
The buffy-crowned wood partridge's primary vocalization is "a rapid series of loud hoarse whistles 'kee-orr-KWA' or 'whew, Whit-cha, cha-waWHAT-cha'", usually preceded by a few hard to hear soft notes. It calls the most at dawn and into daylight and again at dusk.

== Status ==
The IUCN has assessed the buffy-crowned wood partridge as being of Least Concern. "Deforestation may be a threat in some parts of [its] range, although the species appears able to adapt to considerable levels of habitat alteration".
