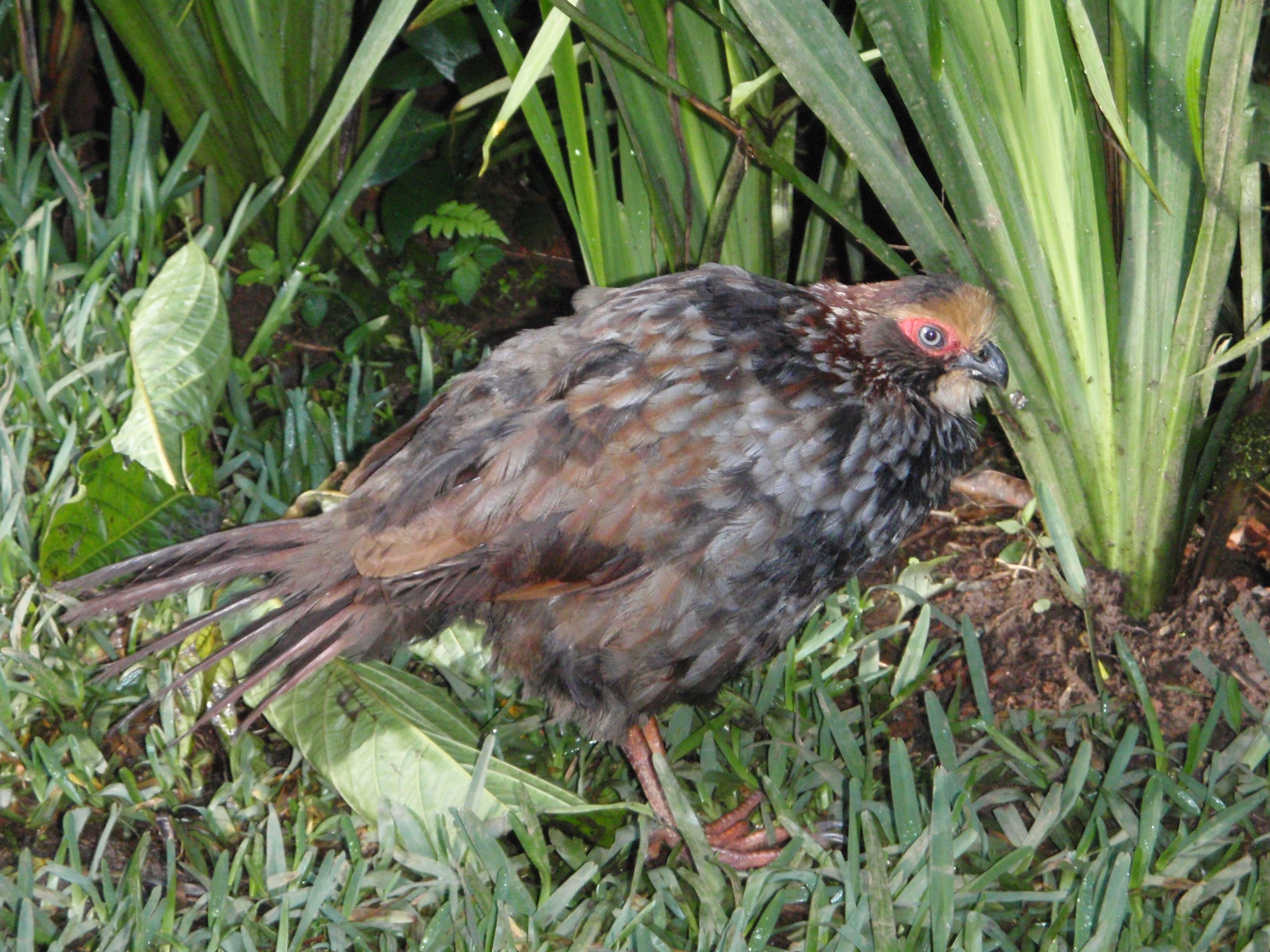
- Buffy-crowned wood partridge

Scientific classification
- Kingdom: Animalia
- Phylum: Chordata
- Class: Aves
- Order: Galliformes
- Family: Odontophoridae
- Genus: Dendrortyx; Gould, 1844

Type species
- Ortyx macroura Jardine & Selby, 1828

= Dendrortyx =

Genus of birds

Dendrortyx is a bird genus in the family Odontophoridae. It contains the following species:

- Bearded wood partridge (Dendrortyx barbatus)
- Buffy-crowned wood partridge (Dendrortyx leucophrys)
- Long-tailed wood partridge (Dendrortyx macroura)
