= Mexican Federal Highway 144 =

Highway in Mexico

Federal Highway 144
- Carretera federal 144

Route information
- Maintained by Secretariat of Infrastructure, Communications and Transportation
- Length: 73.67 km (45.78 mi)

Major junctions
- East end: Fed. 150 south of Azumbilla
- West end: Fed. 140 in San Salvador el Seco

Location
- Country: Mexico
- State: Puebla

Highway system
- Mexican Federal Highways; List; Autopistas
| ← Fed. 143 | → Fed. 145 |

Federal Highway 144 (Carretera Federal 144) is a Federal Highway of Mexico. The highway travels from San Salvador el Seco in the northwest to south of Azumbilla in the southeast.
