= Mexican Federal Highway 130 =

Highway in Mexico

Federal Highway 130
- Carretera federal 130

Route information
- Maintained by Secretariat of Infrastructure, Communications and Transportation
- Length: 247 km (153 mi)

Major junctions
- East end: Fed. 132D south of Tuxpan
- West end: Fed. 105 in Pachuca

Location
- Country: Mexico

Highway system
- Mexican Federal Highways; List; Autopistas
← Fed. 129	→ Fed. 131

Federal Highway 130 (Carretera Federal 130) connects Tuxpan, Veracruz to Pachuca, Hidalgo. Federal Highway 130 includes a short 30 km (18.6 mi) connector route from south of Tuxpan to Tihuatlán that is not connected directly to the rest of the highway. The main segment of Federal Highway 130 begins in the east in Poza Rica, Veracruz.

== Photos ==
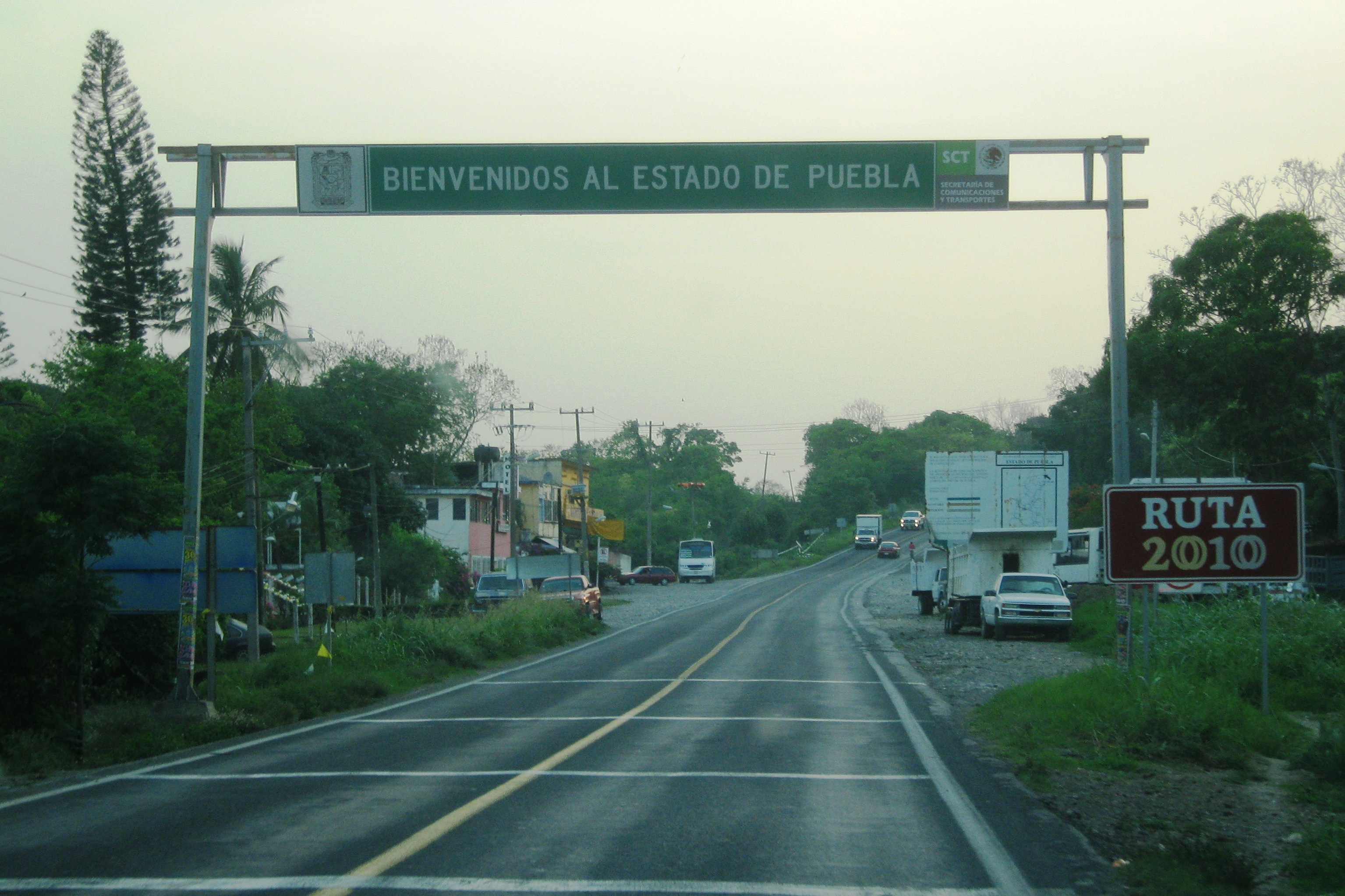
Carretera Federal 130 looking westbound at the Veracruz-Puebla state border, west of Poza Rica.
