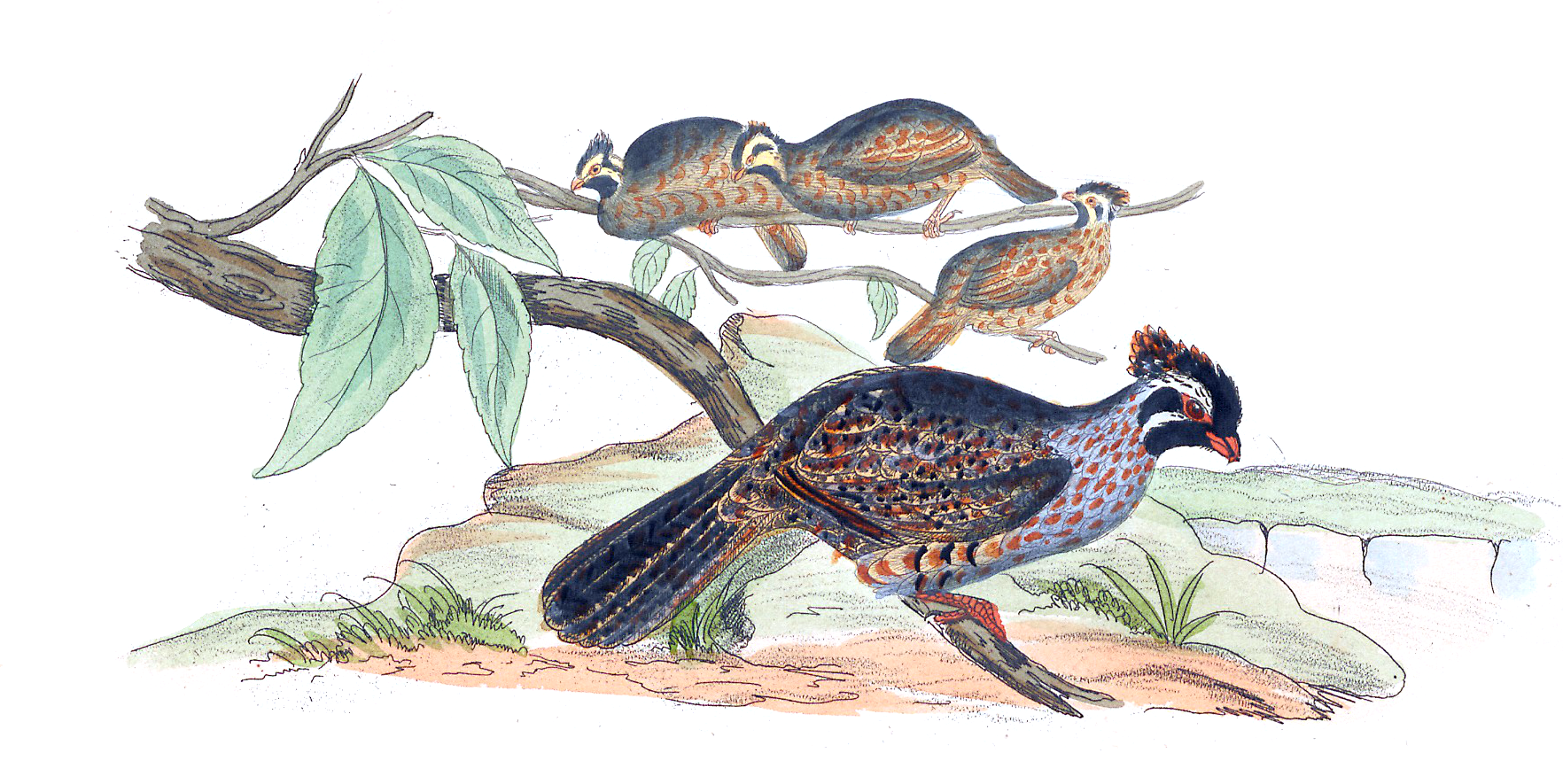

Conservation status
- Least Concern (IUCN 3.1)

Scientific classification
- Kingdom: Animalia
- Phylum: Chordata
- Class: Aves
- Order: Galliformes
- Family: Odontophoridae
- Genus: Dendrortyx
- Species: D. macroura

Binomial name
- Dendrortyx macroura (Jardine & Selby, 1828)

= Long-tailed wood partridge =

Species of bird

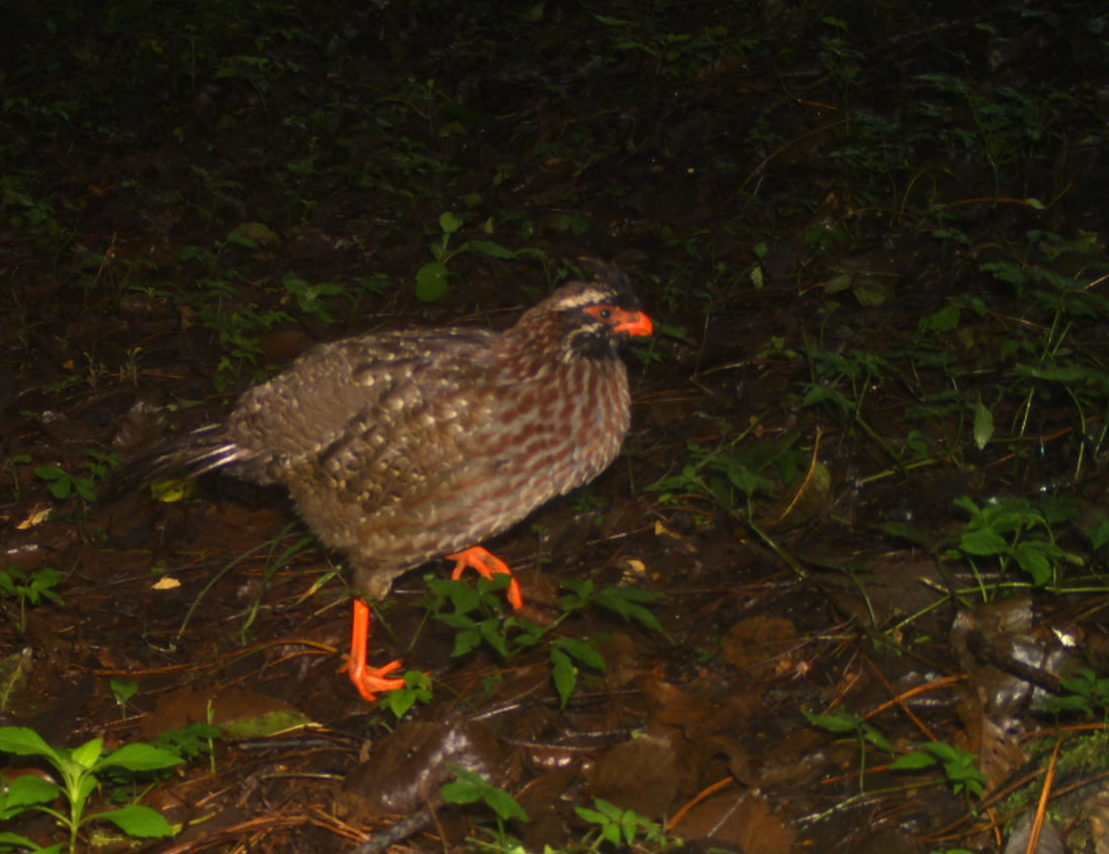
photo from a camera trap

The long-tailed wood partridge (Dendrortyx macroura) is a bird species in the family Odontophoridae, the New World quail. It is found only in Mexico.

== Taxonomy and systematics ==
The long-tailed wood partridge shares the genus Dendrortyx with two other species, all of which appear to be quite distinct from each other. It has these six subspecies:

- D. m. macroura Jardine & Selby (1828)
- D. m. griseipectus Nelson (1897)
- D. m. diversus Friedmann (1943)
- D. m. striatus Nelson (1897)
- D. m. inesperatus Phillips (1966)
- D. m. oaxacae Nelson (1897)

== Description ==
The long-tailed wood partridge is 29.0 to 42.2 cm (11.4 to 16.6 in) long and weighs 266 to 465 g (9.4 to 16.4 oz). Males are heavier than females, and adults of both sexes have a long tail though the female's is somewhat shorter. In adults, most of the head is black; the face has white streaks above and below the eye. The short crest on the crown is tipped with buff. The upper back is chestnut edged with gray and the lower back is olive brown, black, and tawny mottling. The breast is bluish gray with chestnut streaks. The juvenile is similar but with dark brown spots and less chestnut on the underparts. There are variations among the subspecies, but it is unknown if there are vocal differences or genetic ones other than plumage color among them.

== Distribution and habitat ==
The subspecies of the long-tailed wood partridge are distributed in four discrete zones.

- D. m. macroura, Mexico and Veracruz states (east central Mexico)
- D. m. griseipectus, the Pacific slope of Mexico, Mexico City, and Morelos (central Mexico)
- D. m. diversus, northwestern Jalisco (west central Mexico)
- D. m. striatus, southern Jalisco, Michoacán, and Guerrero (west central Mexico)
- D. m. inesperatus, central Guerrero and southern Oaxaca (southern Mexico)
- D. m. oaxacae, Oaxaca (southern Mexico)

The long-tailed wood partridge inhabits humid pine-oak, pine, fir, and montane evergreen forests with dense understories. In elevation it ranges between 1,200 and 3,300 m (3,900 and 10,800 ft).

== Behavior ==
=== Feeding ===
The long-tailed wood partridge forages mainly on the ground, scratching in leaf litter, but also climbs in low branches to search. Its diet is mostly seeds and small fruits but also includes small arthropods and leaves.

=== Breeding ===
The long-tailed wood partridge's breeding season extends from February to September, with nesting itself beginning in late April. Four nests have been described. One was a depression lined with grass in a natural cavity in the ground. One was a cavity of pine needles at the base of a rock and the others were at the base of a rock outcrop and under a small shub. The last two were not well concealed. Three of them each contained four eggs and the other six eggs.

=== Vocalization ===
The long-tailed wood partridge's song is "complex, loud and rhythmic", usually given as a duet by both members of a pair. One description calls it "a loud, ringing korr-EEE-oh, korr-EEE-oh, korr-EEE-oh, korr-EEE-oh". Pairs vocalize at any time of day and night during the breeding season and mostly at dawn and dusk from a night roost otherwise. The species also has an alarm call, "a repetition of short low-pitched, unmodulated squeaky notes."

== Status ==
The IUCN has assessed the long-tailed wood partridge as being of Least Concern. However, its main threat is "habitat loss by land use and land cover change caused by human activities."
