= Cerro Tláloc =

Mountain and archaeological site in Ixtapaluca and Texcoco, Mexico

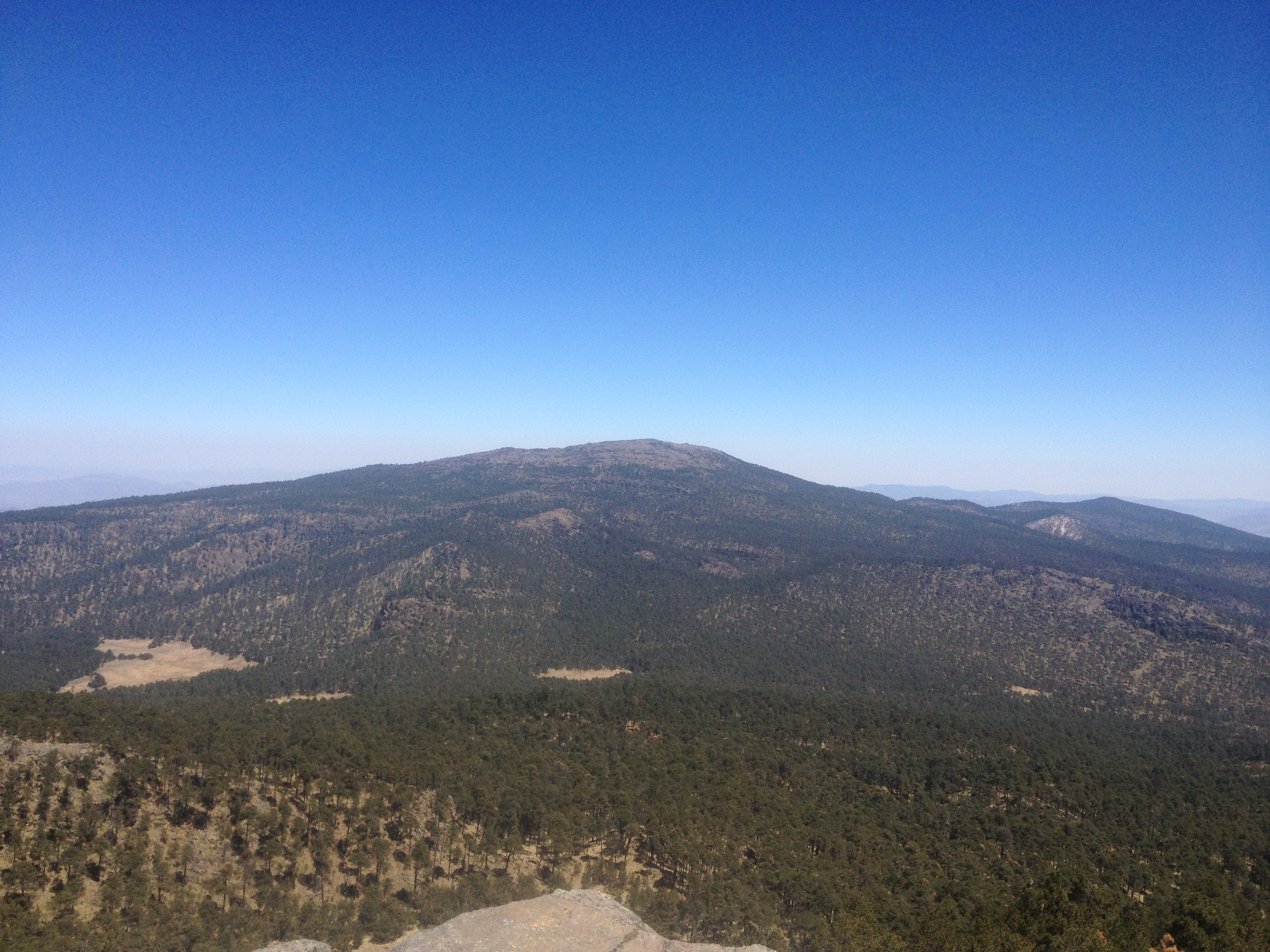
- Cerro Tláloc from the summit of Telapón

Highest point
- Elevation: 4,158 m (13,642 ft)
- Prominence: 968 m (3,176 ft)
- Isolation: 22.65 km (14.07 mi)
- Listing: 9th highest major summit of Mexico; 88th highest major summit of North America
- Coordinates: 19°24.44′N 98°42.45′W

Geography
- Location: Ixtapaluca and Texcoco municipalities, State of Mexico, Mexico

Geology
- Rock age: Plio-Pleistocene
- Mountain type: Stratovolcano
- Volcanic belt: Trans-Mexican Volcanic Belt

Climbing
- Easiest route: hike

Cerro Tláloc (sometimes wrongly listed as Cerro el Mirador; Nahuatl: Tlalocatépetl) is a mountain and archaeological site in central Mexico. It is located in the State of Mexico, in the municipalities of Ixtapaluca and Texcoco, close to the state border with Puebla. Formerly an active volcano, it has an elevation of 4,158 metres (13,642 ft), thus being the ninth highest mountain of Mexico.

The mountain was considered by the Nahuan peoples, foremost among them the Aztecs, to be specially sacred to the raingod Tláloc. In fact, the mountain was believed to be one of his primary earthly dwelling places, called Tlālōcān. Attribution of this and other mountains to the sacred presence of rain deities predates the Aztec era by centuries, even millennia. At the summit there are still remains of a shrine where high ceremonies would have been carried out. The rites of Tláloc were otherwise performed at his temples, most famously that occupying one half of the Templo Mayor at the heart of the temple precinct of nearby Mexico-Tenochtitlan. The inherent analogy of temple pyramids to sacred mountains allows for the very likely possibility that the central temple of the Aztec capital, as such, was at least partly a symbolic representation of the actual Cerro Tláloc, and that the summit shrine of the temple was itself an analogue to that atop the mountain. The shrine atop is one of the highest-elevation shrines in the world.

Together with Mount Telapón (4,060 metres (13,320 ft)) and some other, lower peaks, Cerro Tláloc forms the "Sierra de Río Frío", the northernmost tip of the Sierra Nevada. The mountain is easily accessible from Federal Highway 150 at the town of Río Frío de Juárez. The long, but easy and non-technical hike provides an elevation gain of over 1200 m. More strenuous routes depart from San Pablo Ixayoc and from other towns outside Texcoco.

== Geology ==
Cerro Tláloc is an eroded stratovolcano and the oldest and northernmost volcano in a volcanic chain extending south to Popocatépetl. Volcanism at Tláloc initiated during the Pliocene, with volcanic activity continuing until the Late Pleistocene. A major Plinian eruption about 31,500 years ago produced pyroclastic flows and a major pyroclastic fall deposit composed of pumice.

== Mountain's precinct ==
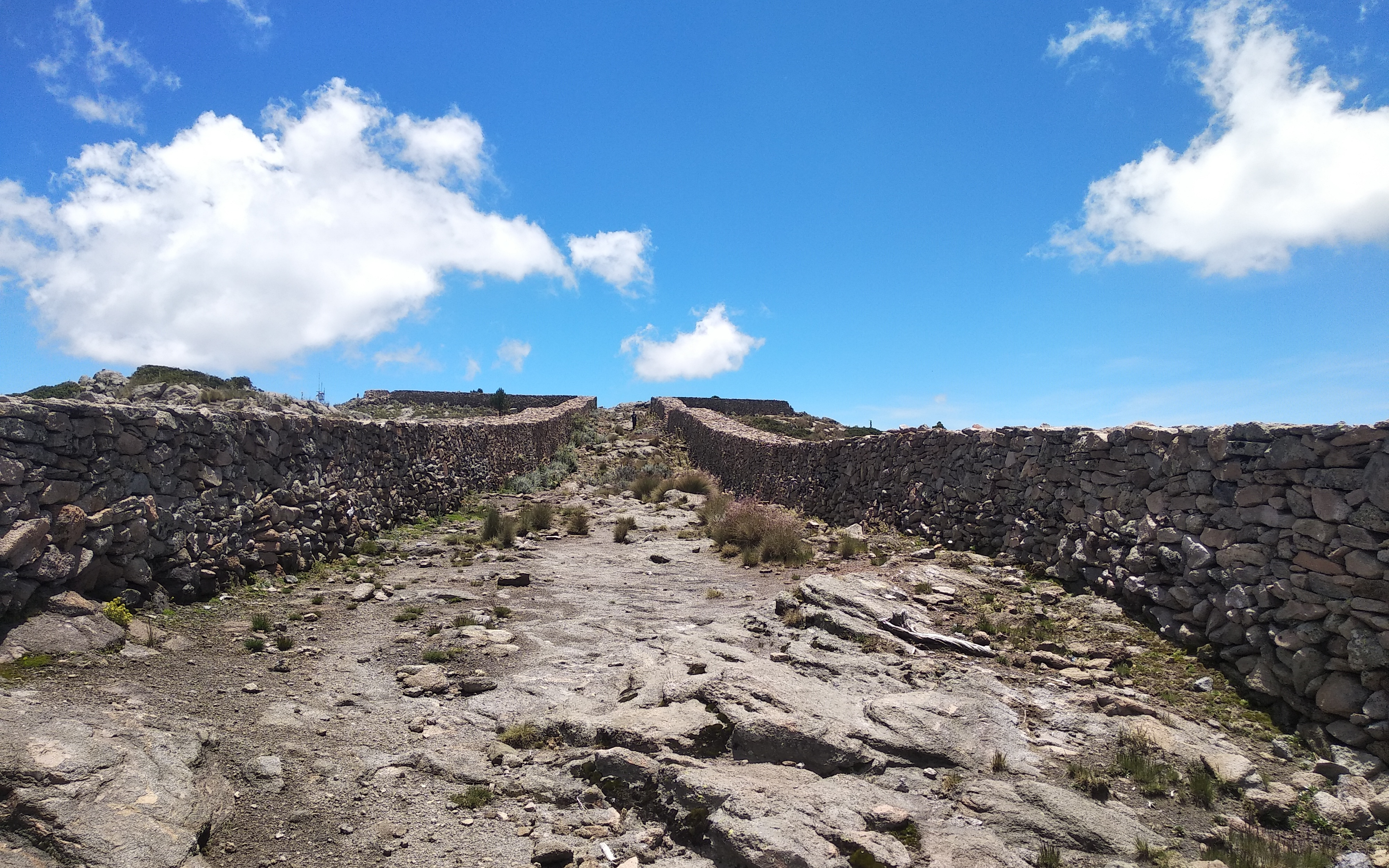
Archeological site atop Cerro Tláloc

Cerro Tláloc features an enclosed precinct on its summit which could be reached through by taking a pathway up the mountain and entering the western side of the enclosure. The structure of the precinct consisted largely of pumice and tufa, which were locally found and were easily molded due to their soft physicality. The precinct houses 5 rock formations, one at the center and 4 at the corners of the tetzacualo, or courtyard. The center rock is thought to be analogous to the Codex Borgia which depicts Tláloc standing in the center of his four rain forms (which are represented by the four directions). These 5 rock formations are representative of the Tlaloque, which are spirits that used vessels of water to distribute rain across the land. In addition, one side of the courtyard featured a construct that housed a statue of Tláloc among other idols that represented nearby sacred regions. This precinct served a major role in allowing a setting at which supplication could be made to the Tlaloque for sustenance of crops and the people of Mesoamerica.

== Ritual practices ==
The Aztecs were known for their rituals that were undertaken in order to secure rain for the land. Extravagant ceremonies and plentiful offerings, were offered to Tláloc in order to please him several times each year with an emphasis at the beginning of the rain season. One annual feast called Huey Tozoztli occurred atop Cerro Tláloc and coincided with the date of highest annual temperature, which usually occurred in April, right before the start of the rainy season. The rulers and elites of Tenochtitlan and nearby states, such as Xochimilco, Tlaxcala, and Tlacopan, were also cited to have joined the feast. Another ceremony that took place atop Cerro Tláloc was Atlachualo which was celebrated from mid-February to early March.The main objective of these offerings were to please Tláloc and the Tlaloque in order to ensure rainfall for the rainy season to come, hence why both of the above ceremonies occurred a few months before the rainy season of summer.

== Archaeological findings ==
Due to the irregularities of the damage done to the walls of the enclosure, researchers have claimed that the damage was likely as a result of human contact, rather than natural phenomena. The site was originally covered with pieces of green stone, shards of pottery, and obsidian blades. The archaeologists claim that the site maybe have been used up until the end of the Christian era. The modern shrine that appears is currently at the summit was likely built around the 1970s as an aerial view of the ritual site in 1956 does not show the current statue.

== See also ==
- Aztec mythology
- List of mountain peaks of Mexico
- Tláloc
