= Santa Rita Tlahuapan =

- Town
- Location in Mexico
- Coordinates: 19°32′N 98°58′W
- Country: Mexico
- State: Puebla
- Elevation: 2,618 m (8,589 ft)

Population (2010)
  - Total: 8,412

Santa Rita Tlahuapan is a municipality in Puebla, Mexico. It is the head town in the municipality of Tlahuapan, in the state of Puebla. Its population is 8412.

The local economy is mostly agriculture and livestock.
