= Recta a Cholula =

Mexican highway connecting the cities of Puebla and Cholula

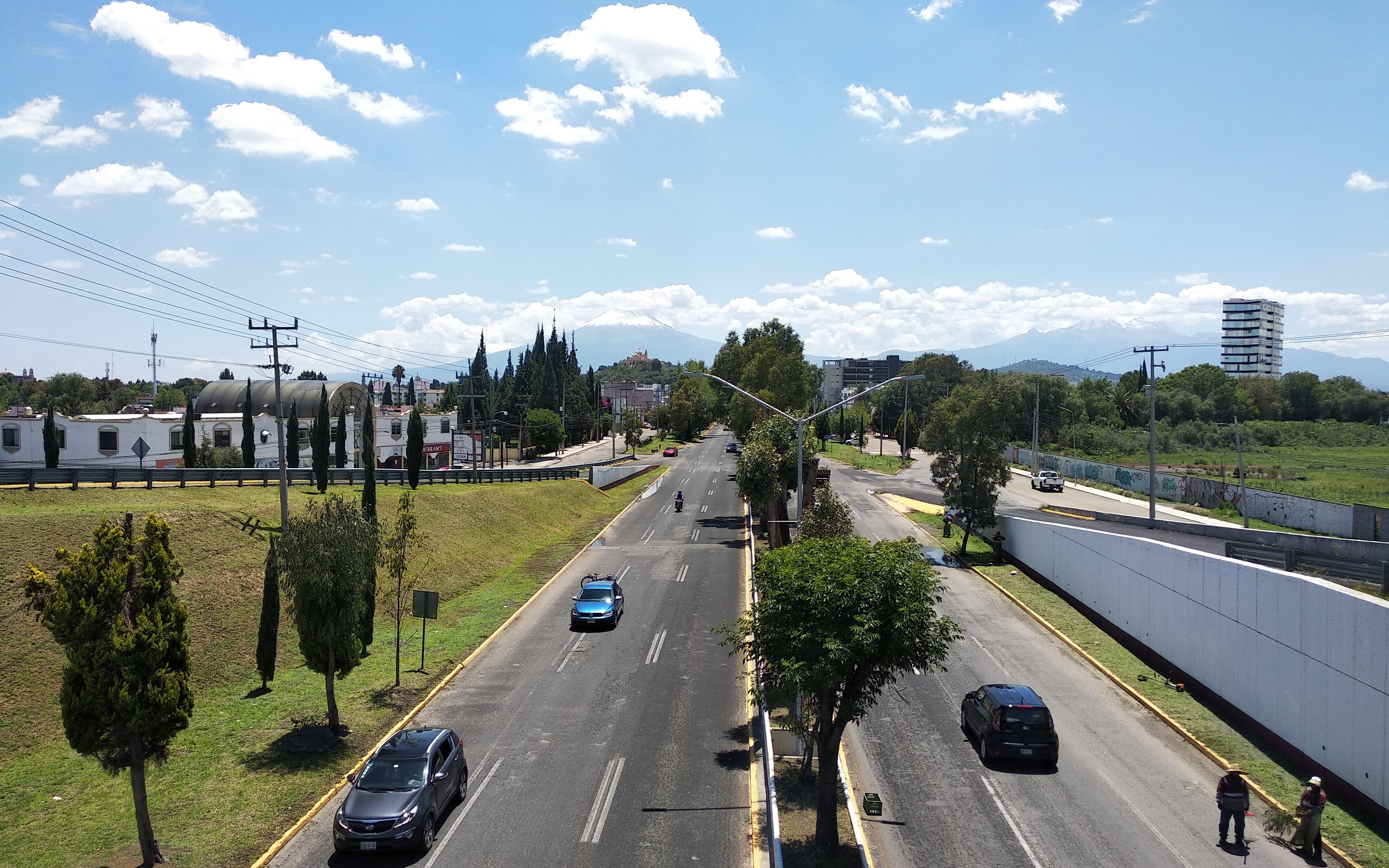
- Recta a Cholula, near UDLAP. In the background, the Great Pyramid of Cholula and the Popocatépetl and Iztaccíhuatl volcanoes.
- Length: approx. 6 km (3.7 mi)

Construction
- Inauguration: 1976

Recta a Cholula, also known as Vía Volkswagen or Ruta Quetzalcóatl, is a local highway that connects the cities of Puebla and Cholula, in the Mexican state of Puebla.

== History ==
Until the 1970s, the main transportation routes between Puebla and Cholula—the Camino Real a Cholula and Avenida Prolongación Reforma, now Boulevard Forjadores de Puebla—were roads that crossed populated areas and, in the second case, they were heavily traveled by passing traffic. Thus, Recta a Cholula was proposed as a fast track to offer a better option for local mobility, as well as the possibility of quickly accessing the Universidad de las Américas Puebla, which had been established in the former Hacienda Santa Catarina Mártir (San Andrés Cholula) in 1970. The works began in 1974, and Recta a Cholula was inaugurated in 1976.
