= Joachín, Veracruz =

Town in Veracruz, Mexico

Joachín
- Locality
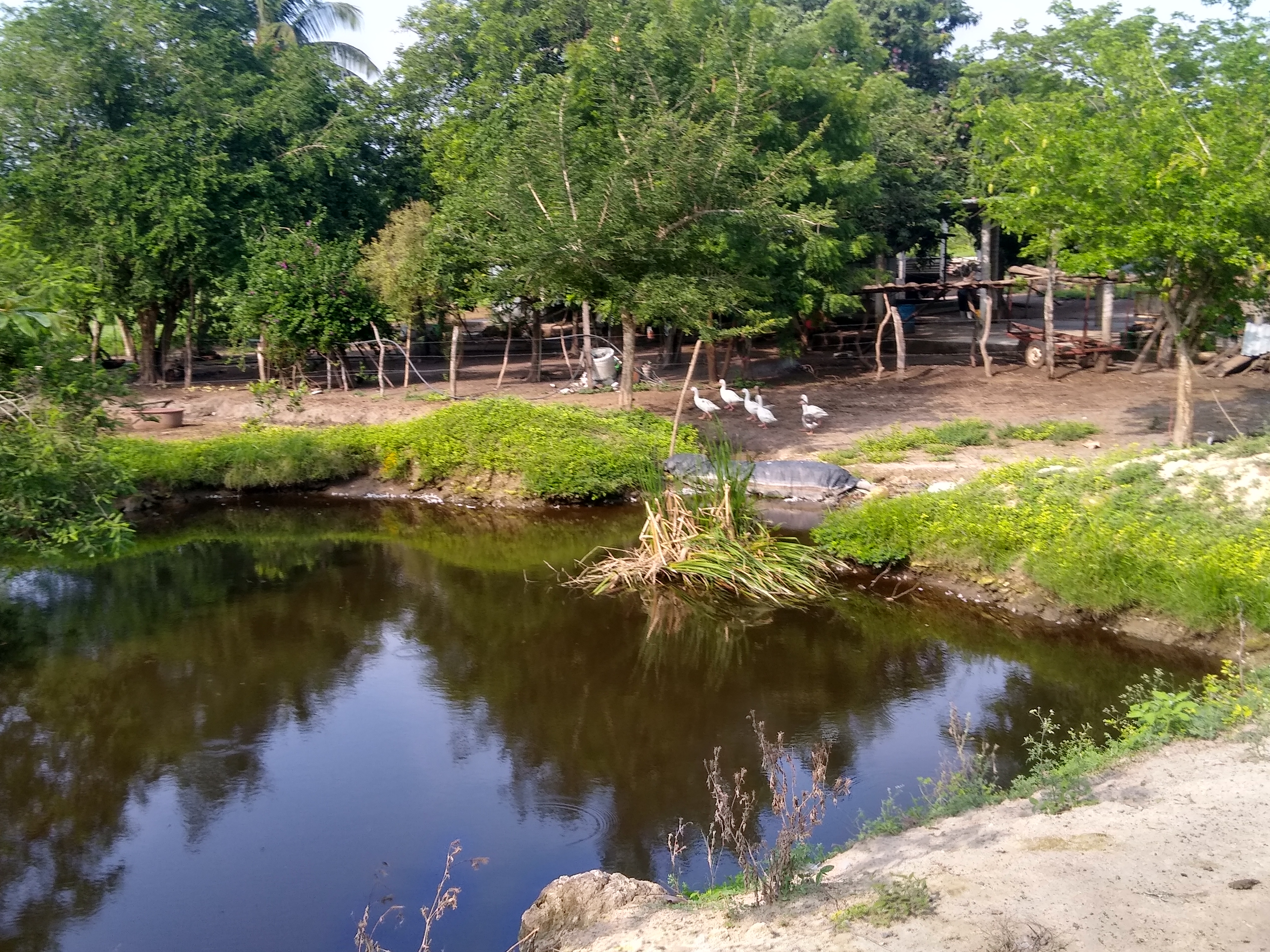
- Pond near Joachín

- Location within Veracruz Location within Mexico
- Coordinates: 18°38′16″N 96°14′06″W
- Country: Mexico
- State: Veracruz
- Municipality: Tierra Blanca

Area
  - Total: 0.83 km^{2} (0.32 sq mi)
- Elevation: 36 m (118 ft)

Population (2020)
  - Total: 2,623
  - Density: 3,200/km^{2} (8,200/sq mi)
- Time zone: UTC-6 (CZ)
- Postal code: 95200

Joachín is a locality in Tierra Blanca, Veracruz, Mexico. It is located in the Papaloapan region, about 31 kilometers northeast of Tierra Blanca. The town is located at an average elevation of 36 meters above the sea level. As of the year 2020, it had a population of 2,623.

== Climate ==
Joachín has a Tropical Savanna Climate (Aw). It sees the most precipitation in September, with an average rainfall of 327 mm; and the least precipitation in February, with an average rainfall of 28 mm.

Climate data for Joachín
Month	Jan	Feb	Mar	Apr	May	Jun	Jul	Aug	Sep	Oct	Nov	Dec	Year
Mean daily maximum °C (°F)	25.7 (78.3)	27.8 (82.0)	30.6 (87.1)	33.5 (92.3)	33.8 (92.8)	31.6 (88.9)	30.8 (87.4)	30.9 (87.6)	30.1 (86.2)	28.9 (84.0)	27.1 (80.8)	26.2 (79.2)	29.8 (85.6)
Daily mean °C (°F)	21.4 (70.5)	22.8 (73.0)	25.0 (77.0)	27.6 (81.7)	28.8 (83.8)	27.2 (81.0)	26.7 (80.1)	26.8 (80.2)	26.2 (79.2)	25.2 (77.4)	23.3 (73.9)	22.1 (71.8)	25.3 (77.5)
Mean daily minimum °C (°F)	18.3 (64.9)	19.4 (66.9)	21.0 (69.8)	23.4 (74.1)	24.7 (76.5)	24.2 (75.6)	23.7 (74.7)	23.8 (74.8)	23.6 (74.5)	22.6 (72.7)	20.4 (68.7)	19.1 (66.4)	22.0 (71.6)
Average rainfall mm (inches)	35 (1.4)	28 (1.1)	29 (1.1)	48 (1.9)	92 (3.6)	302 (11.9)	314 (12.4)	285 (11.2)	327 (12.9)	189 (7.4)	84 (3.3)	37 (1.5)	1,770 (69.7)
Source: Climate-Data.org
