= Tierra Blanca, Veracruz =

City in Veracruz, Mexico

Tierra Blanca
- Locality
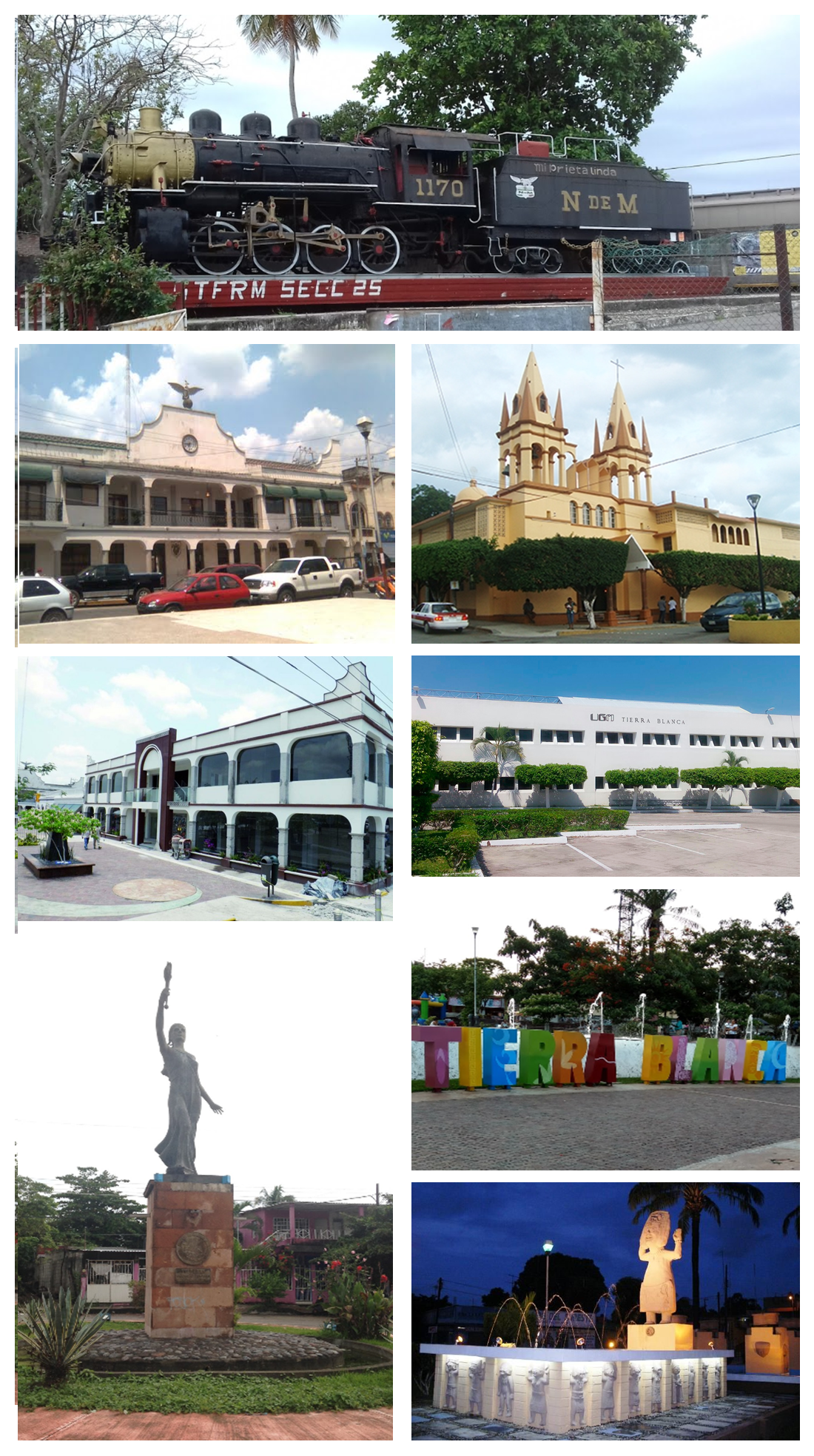
- From top to bottom and left to right: Steam locomotive "Mi Prieta Linda", municipal palace, Church of Our Lady of Carmen, House of Culture "Prof. Carlos Cruz Valenzuela", University of the Gulf of Mexico, "Victoria del Bicentenario" statue, letters spelling out the name of the city, and a monument to the Smiling Faces.

- Location within Veracruz Location within Mexico
- Coordinates: 18°26′56″N 96°21′26″W
- Country: Mexico
- State: Veracruz
- Region: Papaloapan Region
- Elevation: 60 m (200 ft)

Population (2020)
  - Total: 47,035
- Time zone: UTC-6 (Central)
- Postal code: 95100

Tierra Blanca is a city and its surrounding municipality of the same name located in the south-central part of the Mexican state of Veracruz. At the 2005 census the city had a population of 44,171 inhabitants, and 47,824 in 2015. The city serves as the municipal seat of the municipality, which has an area of 1,363.76 km^{2} (526.55 sq mi) and a population of 86,075 inhabitants (2005) and 106,277 (2015). Its largest other community is the town of Joachín.

The municipality has been torn by violence in the 2010s and 2020s. On May 30, 2020, Francisco Navarette Serna, founder of "El Sol de Terra Blance," was one of seven people killed at a party held during the height of the COVID-19 pandemic in Mexico. In 2016, Navarette Serna was accused of being the local drug lord responsible for the murder of five men between 16 and 27 years old from Acayucan in February 2016. Their bodies were crushed to avoid identification.
