= Mexican Federal Highway 129 =

Highway in Mexico

Federal Highway 129
- Carretera federal 129

Route information
- Maintained by Secretariat of Infrastructure, Communications and Transportation
- Length: 251 km (156 mi)

Major junctions
- North end: Fed. 180 in Nautla, Veracruz
- South end: Fed. 150 in Amozoc de Mota, Puebla

Location
- Country: Mexico

Highway system
- Mexican Federal Highways; List; Autopistas
← Fed. 128	→ Fed. 130

Federal Highway 129 (Carretera Federal 129) is a federal highway of Mexico. The highway travels from Nautla, Veracruz, in the northeast to Amozoc de Mota, Puebla, in the southwest.
