= Río Frío de Juárez =

Populated place in the State of Mexico

Coordinates: 19°21′9″N 98°40′11″W

Río Frío de Juárez, originally Río Frío (Cold River), a Mexican populated place, is located in the municipality of Ixtapaluca in the State of Mexico. Río Frío de Juárez is located at the highest point on the highway between Mexico City to Puebla de Zaragoza being located at the top of the pass on the historic road between the two cities.

Rio Frio de Juárez, is located near the far eastern border of the State of Mexico, almost on the border of the State of Puebla, at an altitude of 3,000 meters above sea level. It is located on the main roads of the Federal Highway 150D and Mexico-Puebla Highway 190 or Mexico-Puebla Highway.

The results of the Census of Population and Housing 2005 conducted by the National Institute of Statistics and Geography state that the total population of Rio Frio is 5,272 and that there are 2,620 men and 2,655 women.

== History ==
Rio Frio had its origins with the establishment and development of the Camino Real (Royal Road) linking Mexico City and Veracruz via Puebla, during the colonial era and renamed Camino Nacional (National Road) in the early years of the independent Mexico when there was no other major roadway to the capital from the east coast.

Rio Frio was established at the pass at the top of the mountain range between the Valley of Mexico and Puebla-Tlaxcala Valley surrounded by lush pine forests. It provided food and lodging for the huge number of travelers and riches that were transported along this road, since it was often necessary stay to over night in this place.

During the early years of independent Mexico, this area known as El Monte Rio Frio, became the haunt of bands of raiders who robbed travelers passing through the area. The Mexican government had no ability to protect the roads from these bandits which became common in the area of Rio Frio.

During the Mexican–American War, Río Frío was the post of E,F,G,H,I,J and L companies of the Second Ohio Volunteer Infantry. It was one of the American garrisons protecting their line of communications from Mexico City via Puebla to Vera Cruz from the guerrilla forces of Mexico.

The story of the banditry of Río Frío was made famous by the novel, Los bandidos de Río Frío, by the writer Manuel Payno; this situation ended with the arrival of the government of Porfirio Diaz, who with the use of the Guardia Rural restored security on the roads. This novel was made into a telenovela in 1976.

Popular for hikers and climbers, the town is the main point of access to the Zoquiapan National Forest, which has large areas covered in high mountain forests and volcanos, such as Iztaccíhuatl, Telapón, mount Tlaloc and Cerro Gordo. From the north west part of town there are antique trails that lead to the summit of mount Tlaloc, an extinct volcano on which stands an archeological ceremonial site which at 4,120 m is the highest standing archeological site in the Americas. It was historically recorded as a place of pilgrimship during precolonial times, intended to the adoration of the Mesoamerican rain deity Tlaloc. Today there are still followers of these traditions, most notably people who believe the site to be the Tlalocan, a mythological utopia referred in various ancient Toltec and Aztec codexes. In this Mythology the site regarded as the dwelling place of Tlaloc.

The town is also famous for its alpine architecture and for having one of the lowest average temperature rates in central Mexico; the surroundings of the town are also famous for having a large number of weekend alpine style farms and cabins, and for the High Mountain food style stands along the main roads between Mexico City and Puebla.
