= Caminos y Puentes Federales =

Mexican federal government agency

Federal Roads and Bridges and Related Services
- Caminos y Puentes Federales de Ingresos y Servicios Conexos

Agency overview
- Formed: July 31, 1958 (government agency)
- Preceding agency: Compañía Constructora del Sur, S.A. de C.V.
- Jurisdiction: Secretariat of Infrastructure, Communications and Transportation
- Headquarters: Calzada de los Reyes 24, Cuernavaca, Morelos
- Employees: 8,000 (2013)
- Annual budget: MXN2.643 billion (2013)
- Agency executive: Benito Neme Sastré, Director General
- Website: www.gob.mx/capufe

Caminos y Puentes Federales de Ingresos y Servicios Conexos (Federal Roads and Bridges and Related Services, CAPUFE) is a federal government agency of Mexico that operates and maintains federally owned roads and bridges. It is part of the Secretariat of Infrastructure, Communications and Transportation (SICT) and its offices are located in Cuernavaca, Morelos.

== History ==
On October 14, 1949, Compañía Constructora del Sur, S.A. de C.V. was formed as a subsidiary of Nacional Financiera (México) with the goal of creating high-quality roads. Upon the opening of the first two toll roads in Mexico, the Mexico-Cuernavaca highway and the Amacuzac-Iguala highway, their administration and operation was awarded to CCS, which changed its name to Caminos Federales de Ingresos, S.A. de C.V. On July 31, 1958, by presidential decree, Caminos Federales de Ingresos became a government agency, part of the Secretariat of Communications and Public Works. It now administered additional highways, such as the construction of the Mexico-Querétaro highway that opened that October.

In 1959, the Secretariat of Communications and Public Works became the Secretariat of Communications and Transportation, and the new Secretariat of Public Works was created. The name changed on June 3, 1959 to Caminos y Puentes Federales de Ingresos upon the opening of the Sinaloa River toll bridge. It began operating ferries between Zacatal and Ciudad del Carmen in Campeche in 1960, and in 1963, a related agency was established to rent heavy equipment for construction purposes, prompting one final name change to Caminos y Puentes Federales de Ingresos y Servicios Conexos. The scope of CAPUFE expanded at this time: in 1964, a pavement factory was opened at Irapuato in Guanajuato, with a second facility created in 1971 at Chontalpa, Tabasco.

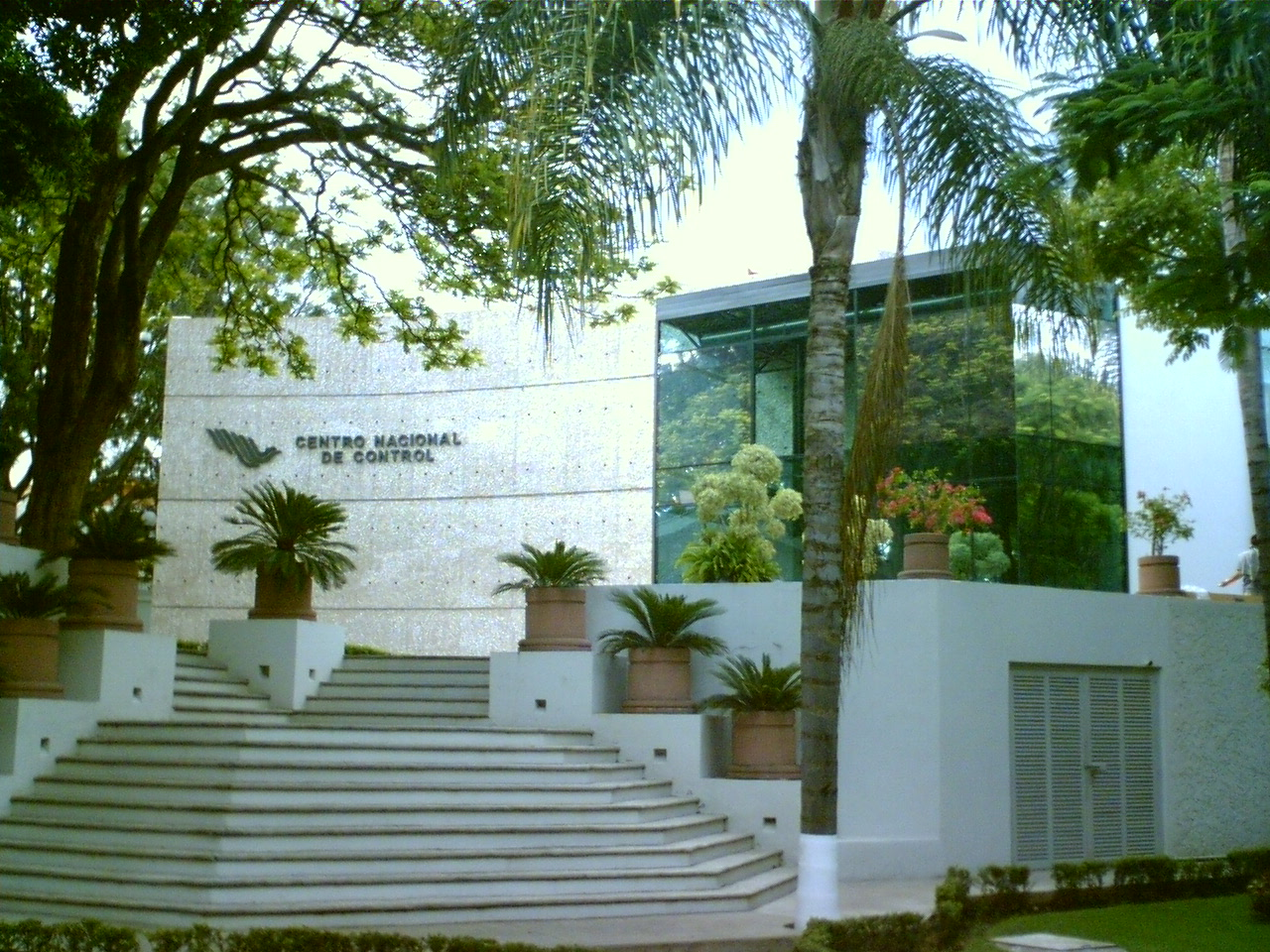
The National Control Center at CAPUFE's headquarters in Cuernavaca

After the 1985 Mexico City earthquake, CAPUFE's offices moved to Cuernavaca, making it the first government agency to relocate away from the capital following the earthquake. After establishing itself at various locations in the city, CAPUFE's current offices were completed in 1993. In the 1990s, CAPUFE modernized and reformed itself; it began improving its toll systems, and it received from BANOBRAS a series of 23 highway concessions that had been rescued, expanding its network.

== Highway network ==
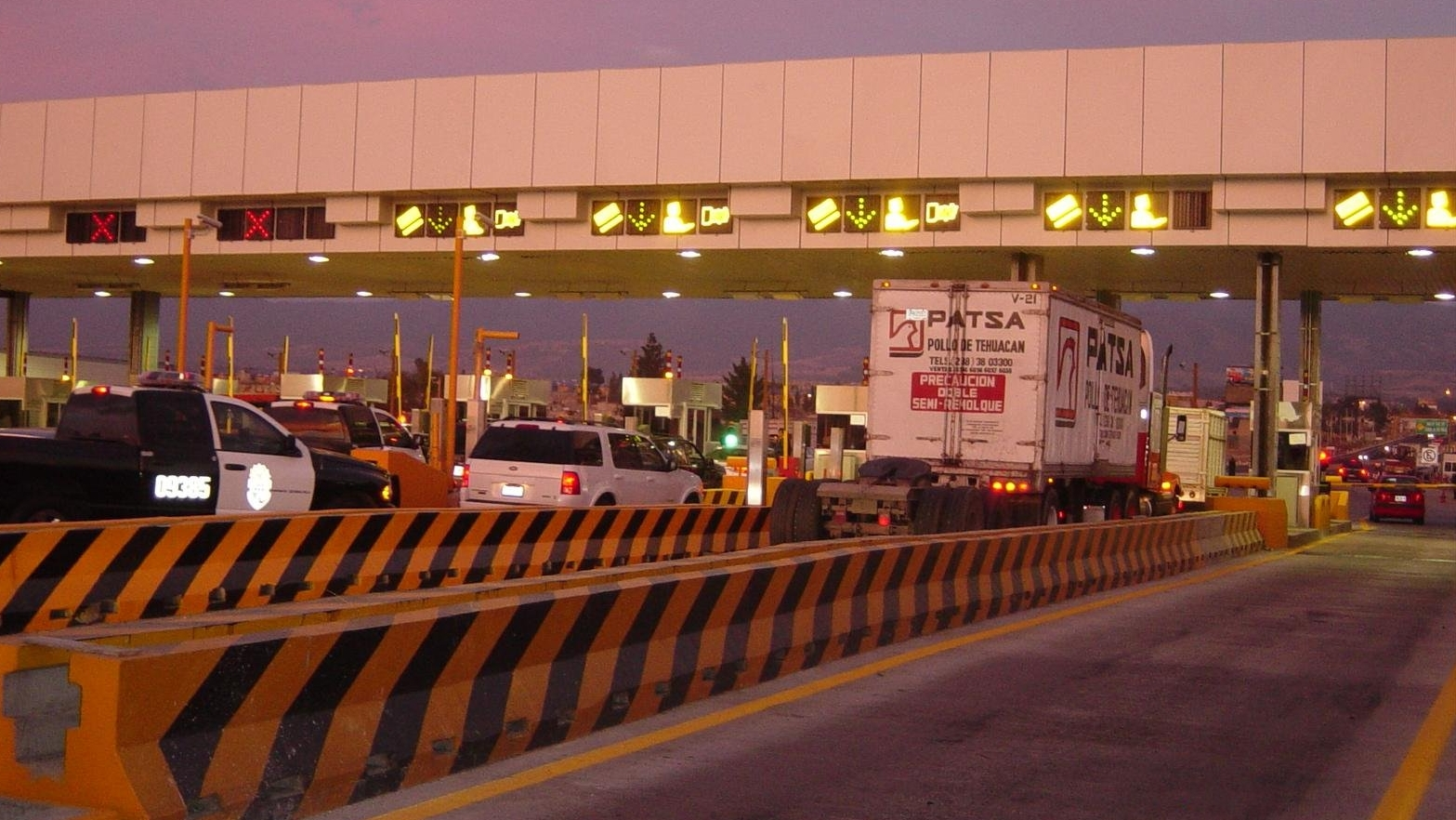
The San Marcos toll booth on Mexican Federal Highway 150D (Mexico City-Puebla)

Three types of toll highways are operated by CAPUFE:

- The Red Propia consists of the highways and bridges whose concessions were awarded to CAPUFE;
- The Red Contratada consists of highways and bridges whose concessions are held by third parties, which in turn contract CAPUFE to operate and maintain the roads;
- and the Red FNI or Red FONADIN (Fondo Nacional de Infraestructura or National Infrastructure Fund), which consists of the concessions held by BANOBRAS and FONADIN.

In total, CAPUFE operates 4,069 of the 8,459 kilometers of toll roads in Mexico.

== Bridges ==
In 2013, CAPUFE administered 18 national and 17 international bridges.
