= Mexican Federal Highway 150 =

Highway in Mexico

Federal Highway 150
- Carretera federal 150

Route information
- Maintained by Secretariat of Infrastructure, Communications and Transportation
- Length: 461.24 km (286.60 mi)

Major junctions
- East end: Veracruz
- West end: Mexico City

Location
- Country: Mexico

Highway system
- Mexican Federal Highways; List; Autopistas
← Fed. 147	→ Fed. 160

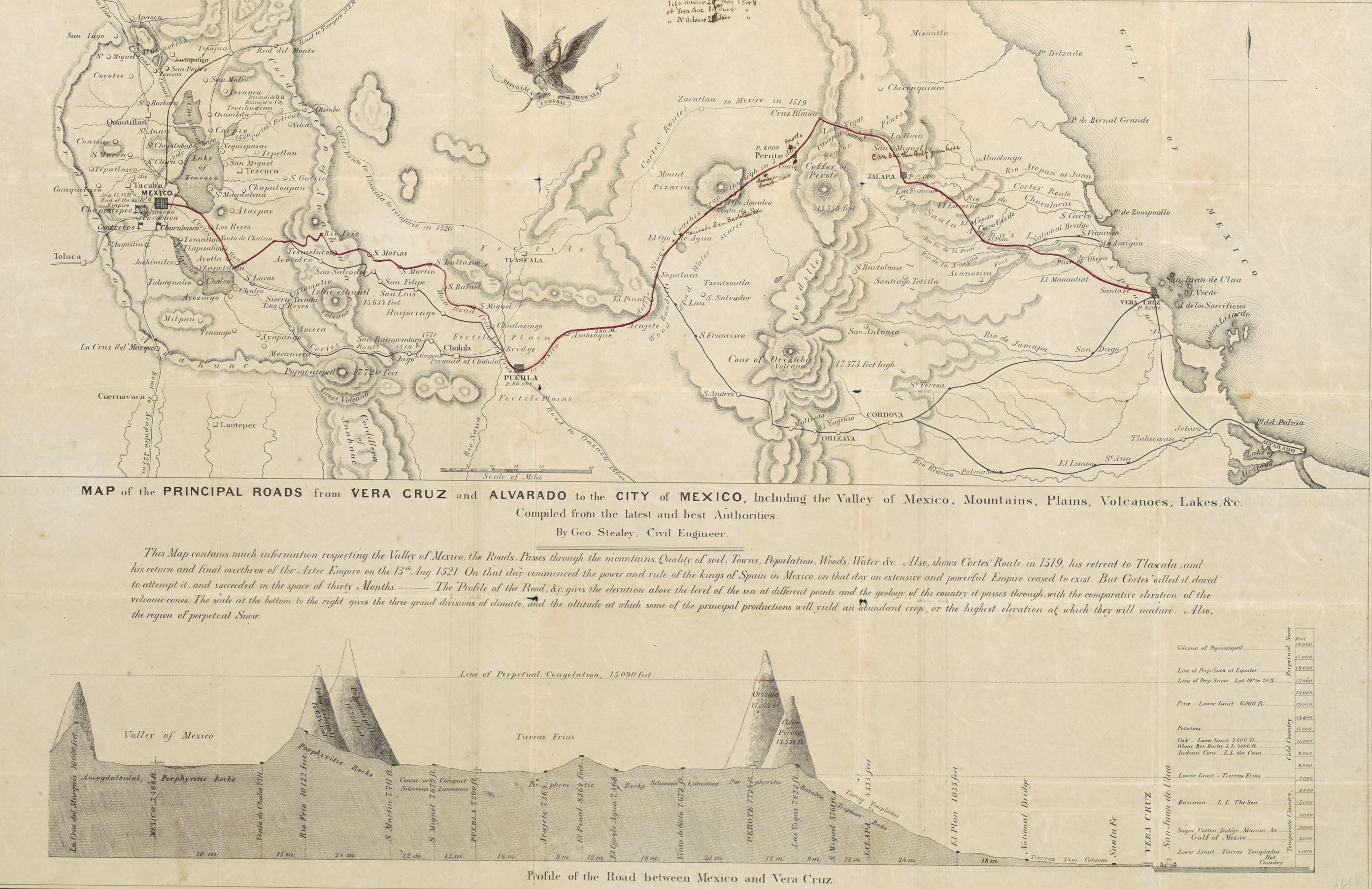
Map of the roads from Veracruz to Mexico City in 1847

Federal Highway 150 (Carretera Federal 150) or colloquially called Carretera Puebla - Tehuacan, Carretera Tehuacan - Orizaba, is a Federal Highway of Mexico. The highway travels from Mexico City in the west to Veracruz, Veracruz in the east. Federal Highway 150 is one of five Mexican Federal Highways that terminate in Mexico's capital city.
