= Pico de Tancítaro =

Volcano in Mexico

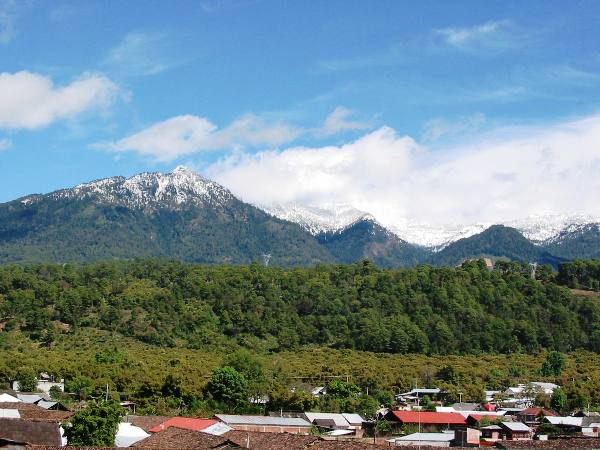

Highest point
- Elevation: 3,840 m (12,600 ft)
- Prominence: 1,663 m (5,456 ft)
- Parent peak: Pico de Orizaba
- Coordinates: 19°24′59.4180″N 102°19′11.0028″W

Geography
- Location within Mexico
- Location: Tancítaro, Michoacán, Mexico

Geology
- Mountain type: Stratovolcano
- Volcanic belt: Trans-Mexican Volcanic Belt

Pico de Tancítaro, also known as Volcán Tancítaro, is a volcanic mountain in Mexico. It is located in Tancítaro municipality in Michoacán state. It is the highest peak in Michoacán.

== Geology ==
Pico de Tancítaro is an andesitic-dacitic stratovolcano. It was active from 800,000 to 237,000 years ago, and is currently believed to be extinct. It is part of the much larger Michoacán–Guanajuato volcanic field. Portions of the volcanic field are still active. Parícutin is a young volcano located 11 km northeast of Pico de Tancítaro. It first erupted in 1943 and remained active and grew in size until 1952.

== Ecology ==
Plant communities on the mountain include pine-oak forest, open pine forest, and montane mesophyll or cloud forest, with alpine grasslands, known as Zacatonal, at higher elevations.

Pine-oak forest is the predominant plant community from the base of the mountain to 3450 meters elevation. Common pine species include Pinus pseudostrobus, Pinus montezumae, Pinus devoniana, and Pinus teocote, with Pinus gordoniana and Pinus maximinoi less common. Oaks, including Quercus crassipes, Quercus laurina, and Quercus rugosa, occur between 2100 and 2800 meters elevation, either dominant or co-dominant with pines. The broadleaf trees and shrubs Alnus acuminata, Arbutus xalapensis, Berberis moranensis, Ageratina mairetiana, and Lippia umbellata are also found among the oaks and pines. Forests of oyamel fir (Abies religiosa) occur in well-watered areas between 2450 and 3400 meters elevation, in pure stands or mixed with pines and oaks. Pinus hartwegii becomes dominant around 3400 meters elevation.

Mountain mesophilic forest, or cloud forest, is found on slopes between 2000 and 2600 meters elevation with high year-round humidity and frequent fog, particularly in ravines which offer year-round water and protection from drying winds and sun. Typical trees include Quercus calophylla, Carpinus tropicalis, Alnus acuminata, Crataegus mexicana, and species of Meliosma, Symplocos, Prunus, Cinnamomum, Styrax, Tilia, Viburnum, and Xylosma. Creepers and lianas include species of Archibaccharis, Celastrus, Philadelphus, Smilax, and Vitis. epiphytes are abundant, including ferns, orchids, bromeliads, and species of Piperaceae and Crassulaceae.

Subalpine grasslands, known as Zacatonal or zacatal, occur as low as 3000 meters elevation on outcrops of volcanic sandstone, and become predominant above 3400 meters elevation. Woodlands of Juniperus monticola with a subalpine grassland understory are common around 3500 meters elevation. Typical grasses are Muhlenbergia cenchroides, Bouteloua purpurea, Bromus exaltatus, Festuca amplissima, Festuca breviglumis, Muhlenbergia macroura, Poa annua, Piptochaetium sp., Peyritschia virletii, and Zeugites americanus. Herbs and shrubs include species of Arenaria, Carex, Cerastium, Cirsium, Draba, Eryngium, Gnaphalium, Juniperus, Luzula, Phacelia, Plantago, Potentilla, Ranunculus, Senecio, and Trisetum.

The mountain is home to about 207 species of animals, including Cooper's hawk (Astur cooperii), Brown-backed solitaire (Myadestes occidentalis), blunt-headed salamander (Ambystoma amblycephalum), Pátzcuaro peeping frog (Eleutherodactylus angustidigitorum), Montezuma leopard frog (Lithobates montezumae), mud turtles (Kinosternon sp.), Popocatepetl alligator lizard (Barisia imbricata), and Baird's patchnose snake (Salvadora bairdi), among others.

== Pico de Tancítaro Flora and Fauna Protection Area ==
Pico de Tancítaro Flora and Fauna Protection Area covers 23,405 ha, ranging from 2,200 to 3,840 meters in elevation. The area was designated a national park on 27 July 1940, and redesignated a flora and fauna protection area on 19 August 2009. It is still widely known as Pico de Tancítaro National Park. The protected area includes both Pico de Tancítaro and Parícutin.
