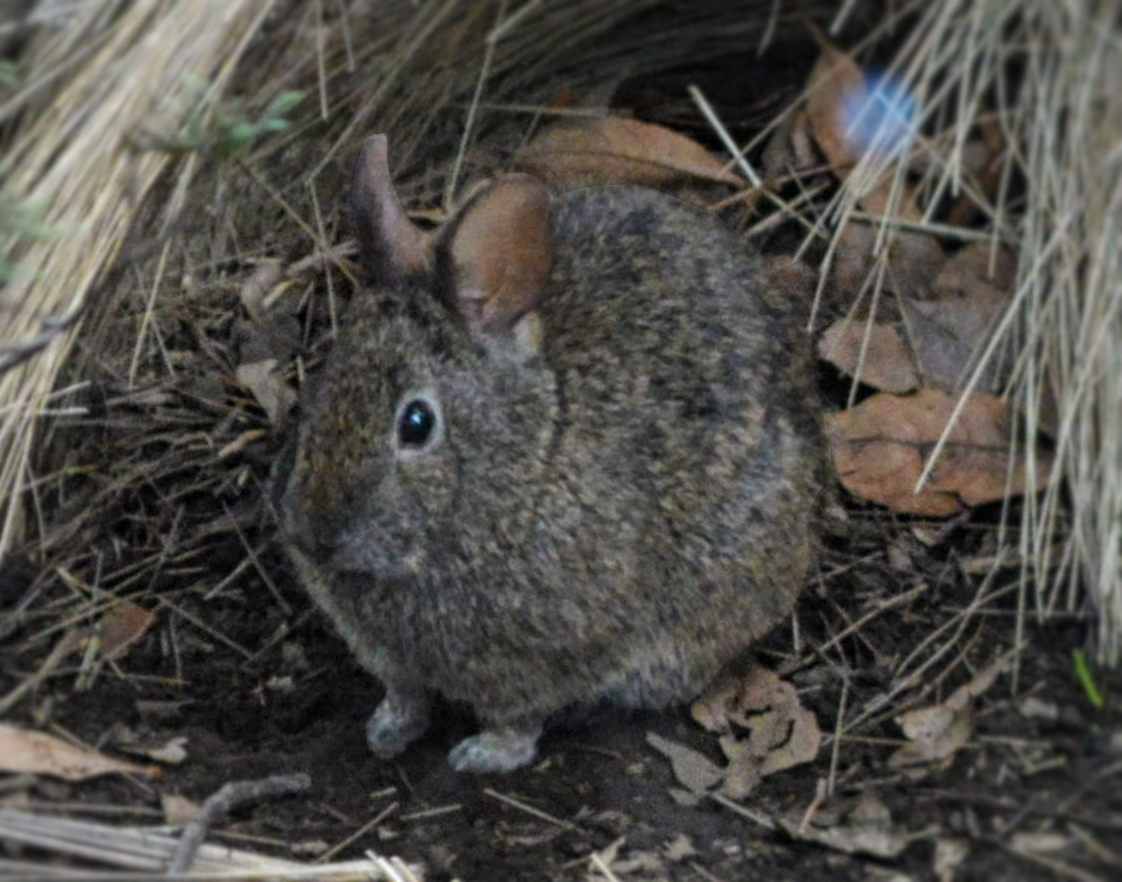
- Chapultepec Zoo, Mexico City

Conservation status
- Endangered (IUCN 3.1)
- CITES Appendix I

Scientific classification
- Kingdom: Animalia
- Phylum: Chordata
- Class: Mammalia
- Order: Lagomorpha
- Family: Leporidae
- Genus: Romerolagus; Merriam, 1896
- Species: R. diazi

Binomial name
- Romerolagus diazi (Ferrari-Pérez in A. Díaz, 1893)
- Volcano rabbit range
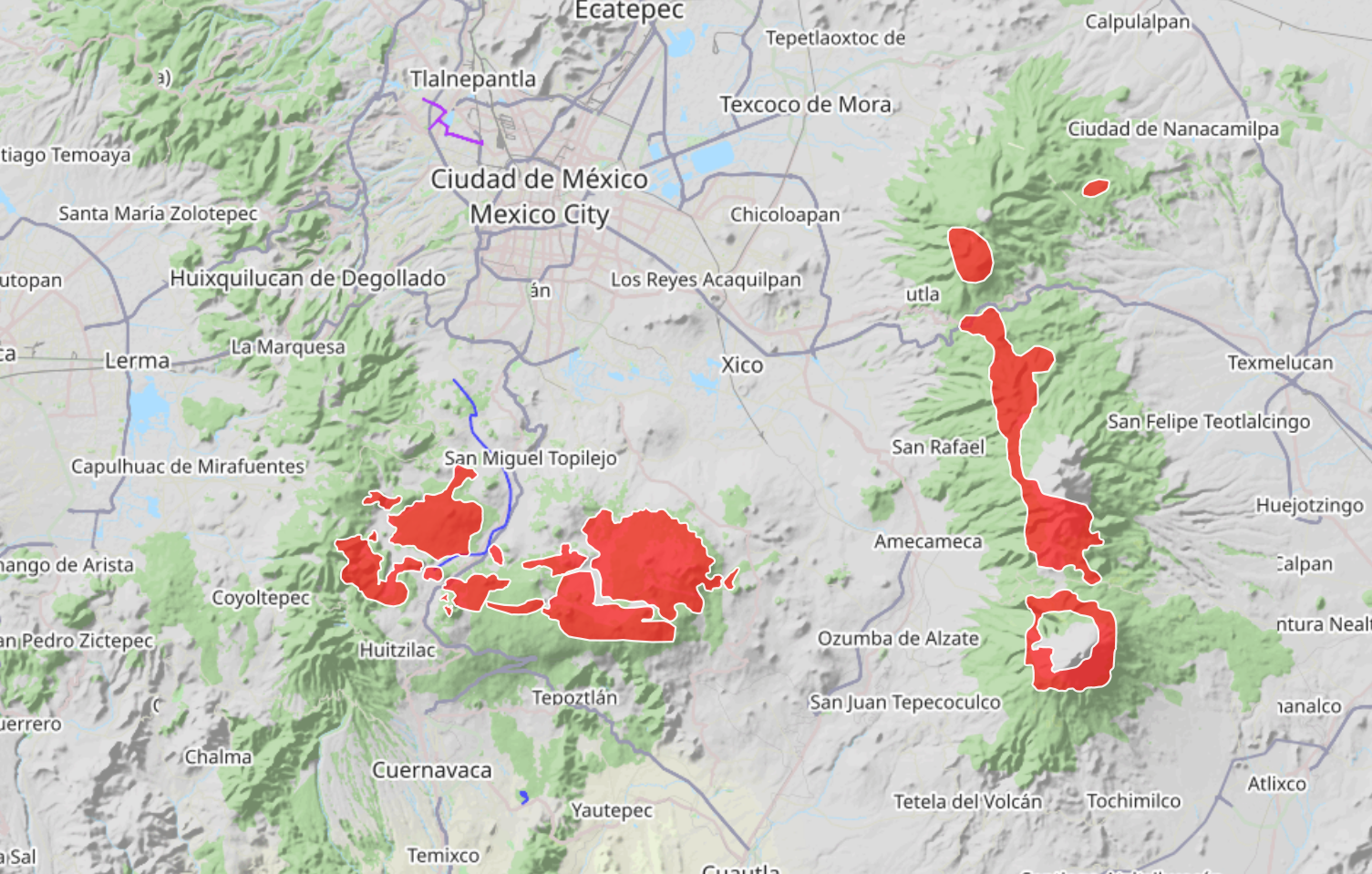
- Large-scale range map showing relief of area surrounding Mexico City

Synonyms
- Lepus diazi (Ferrari-Pérez in A. Díaz, 1893); Romerolagus nelsoni C. H. Merriam, 1896

= Volcano rabbit =

Species of rabbit

The volcano rabbit (Romerolagus diazi) (Spanish: conejo de los volcanes), also known as the teporingo or zacatuche, is a species of small rabbit that lives in pine and alder forests on volcanic slopes in Mexico. It is the only species in the genus Romerolagus and is considered to be the most primitive species among the rabbits and hares. It has small, rounded ears, short legs, a large forehead, and short, thick fur. It is one of the world's smallest rabbits, lives in groups consisting of between two and five members, and makes burrows (underground nests) and runways (worn-down, frequently traveled surface paths) among bunchgrasses. Up to three young are produced per litter, born in nests formed from shallow depressions in the ground lined with fur and plant matter.

Uniquely among the rabbits, the volcano rabbit emits high-pitched sounds to warn other rabbits of danger, a habit common in the related pikas. It is awake and most active in the early morning and evening. Populations have been estimated as approximately 7,000 adult individuals over their entire range. Human developments surrounding the volcano rabbit's habitat—including overgrazing, hunting, and burning of the species' preferred scrublands—have caused significant declines in population, even in protected parks. Both the IUCN and the Mexican government consider the volcano rabbit an endangered species. It is listed on Appendix I of the CITES treaty, which is intended to restrict trade of the animal.

== Taxonomy and etymology ==
Romerolagus diazi was first described by the head of the Mexican Geographical and Exploring Commission, Fernando Ferrari-Pérez, in 1893 as a member of the hares (genus Lepus), using the scientific name Lepus diazi and common name conejo del Volcán (volcano rabbit). The species name diazi honors the Mexican cartographer Agustín Díaz, who published the work where the species was first described. The type specimen was collected on the northeastern slopes of Ixtaccíhuatl, a volcano near San Martín Texmelucan, in the Mexican state of Puebla. It was separately described as the Popocatepetl rabbit, Romerolagus nelsoni, in 1896 by American zoologist Clinton Hart Merriam in an account that did not refer to the earlier work of Ferrari-Pérez. Merriam noted a type specimen that was collected on Popocatépetl at an altitude of 3,350 metres (10,990 feet) by Edward William Nelson, an American naturalist for whom Merriam named the species. Merriam noted several characteristics that differed significantly from any member of the hares, such as its anatomy and means of locomotion (running on all four legs rather than hopping), and gave it the genus name Romerolagus in honor of Matías Romero, Mexican ambassador in the United States and a supporter of the United States Biological Survey in Mexico. American zoologist Gerrit Smith Miller Jr. noted the discrepancy between the two descriptions and, after consulting with Nelson and Ferrari-Pérez in 1911, clarified the nomenclature of the species by using the name Romerolagus diazi, a new combination, and making Romerolagus nelsoni and Lepus diazi synonyms of the new name. From this point up until the 1950s, the authority of the species was attributed to Díaz alone; biologist Paulino Rojas Mendoza argued in 1952 that the correct name under International Code of Zoological Nomenclature rules would credit Ferrari-Pérez as well. Since then, the scientific name and authority of the volcano rabbit has been Romerolagus diazi (Ferrari-Pérez in A. Díaz, 1893).

The volcano rabbit is named for its preferred habitat: the slopes of volcanoes. One Nahuatl name, zacatochtle, refers to the rabbit's relationship with subalpine tussock grass in the genus Festuca (referred to as zacate in Spanish, zacatl in Nahuatl). The name comes from the combination of zacatl and tochtle ('rabbit'), and has been modified to the currently-used epithet zacatuche ('grass rabbit'). Another common name, teporingo, likely derives from Classical Nahuatl, combining tepētl ('mountain'), olīn ('movement') and the suffix -co referring to location. Several accounts of the species find no obvious etymology for this name, and tentatively ascribe it to a corruption of another name in Nahuatl.

=== Phylogeny ===
No subspecies of the volcano rabbit are recognized, and it is the only species within its genus. No fossils of the volcano rabbit are known, but analysis of its morphology and genetic records indicate it is the most morphologically primitive living leporid. The species has high genetic diversity and is separated into five haplogroups (lines of descent based on specific alleles) across its distribution; these groups appear to have some level of gene flow between them due to the short distance between populations. It was in 1929 placed in the subfamily Paleolaginae by Lee R. Dice, alongside Pentalagus, Pronolagus, and the extinct †Alilepus and †Palaeolagus. The following cladogram is based on mitochondrial genome analysis of the volcano rabbit, the European rabbit, the snowshoe hare (Lepus americanus), and the black-tailed jackrabbit (Lepus californicus), as well as a broader phylogenetic tree produced by biologist Leandro Iraçabal Nunes and colleagues:

- - Lagomorpha
    - Leporidae
      - - - - - - Caprolagus (hispid hare)
                - Pentalagus (Amami rabbit)
              - Sylvilagus (cottontail rabbits)
            - Lepus (hares)
          - Oryctolagus (European rabbit)
        - Romerolagus (volcano rabbit)
      - - - Pronolagus (Red rock hares)
          - Poelagus (Bunyoro rabbit)
        - Nesolagus (striped rabbits)
    - Ochotonidae (pikas)

== Characteristics ==
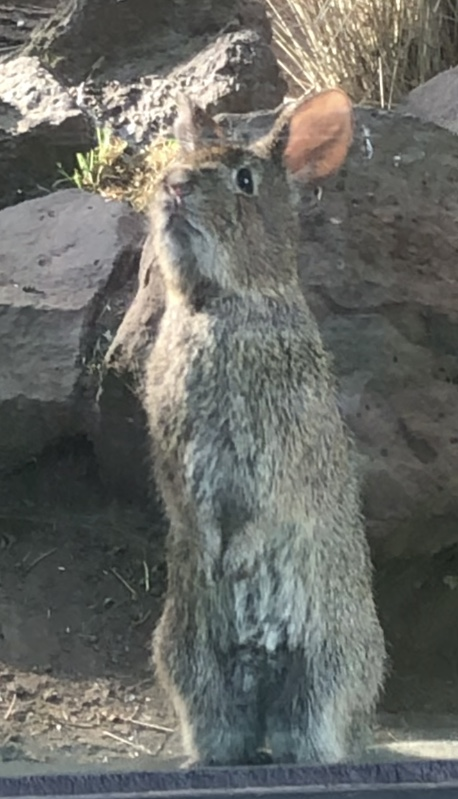
A volcano rabbit standing on its hind legs at the Chapultepec Zoo

The volcano rabbit is one of the smallest rabbits in the world, having an adult weight that ranges from 386 to 602 g (0.851 to 1.327 lb) and a total length of 23.4 to 31.1 centimeters (9.2 to 12.2 in). Its ears are small and rounded, measuring less than 4 centimeters (1.6 in) in length, and the hind feet are short, measuring 4.2 to 5.5 centimeters (1.7 to 2.2 in). It has a vestigial tail which is only visible in young rabbits and becomes hidden under the skin in adulthood. Three pairs of mammary glands are present in female rabbits. The volcano rabbit has dense, short fur. Its fur is yellowish brown across all of its body, and is softer on the rabbit's underside. Each hair is black at the base and tip and antimony yellow in the middle. This fur color changes only near the nose, eyes, and at the base of the ears, where it appears more buff. The dark coloration of the volcano rabbit's fur blends in with the volcanic soils in its habitat. This adaptation may help it evade predators. Its coat does not change color from one season to the next. However, it does undergo molting in four stages over the course of the year. First, hair is lost, then melanin disappears, then melanin is deposited at the site of hair loss, after which hair regrows. The volcano rabbit strongly resembles pikas, closely related mountain-dwelling lagomorphs, though Marcus Ward Lyon Jr., a naturalist credited with the complete classification of the rabbit and hare genera, notes it as being closest in appearance to the Amami rabbit.

The skull of the volcano rabbit has small triangle-shaped projections from the brow ridge towards the back of the head. It has a long palate, and a distinctly separated interparietal bone. Like other leporids, it has a dental formula of 2.0.3.31.0.2.3 × 2 = 28, indicating that it has two pairs of upper and one pair of lower incisors, no canines, three upper and two lower premolars on each side, and three upper and lower molars on either side of the jaw. The cheekbones are wide, larger towards the back of the head, and the auditory bullae (bony structures that enclose the external structure of the ear) are large compared to those of other leporids, larger than the foramen magnum (the hole at the base of the skull that the spinal cord passes through). The clavicle is complete and connects directly to the sternum, which is on average smaller than that of other rabbits and hares. The central part of the sternum is segmented into three parts, which are articulated with six pairs of the ribs. The rabbit's navicular bone is short and does not extend below the metatarsal bones. It has a strong curve to its pelvis. The rabbit's morphological features, specifically the arrangement of its teeth, resembles those of several extinct leporids from the Tertiary period, including †Nekrolagus, which lived during the Pliocene. The hip bones of the volcano rabbit are more similar to another extinct species, †Limnolagus, aside from being thinner and more pronounced towards the front and bottom part of the spine.

== Distribution and habitat ==
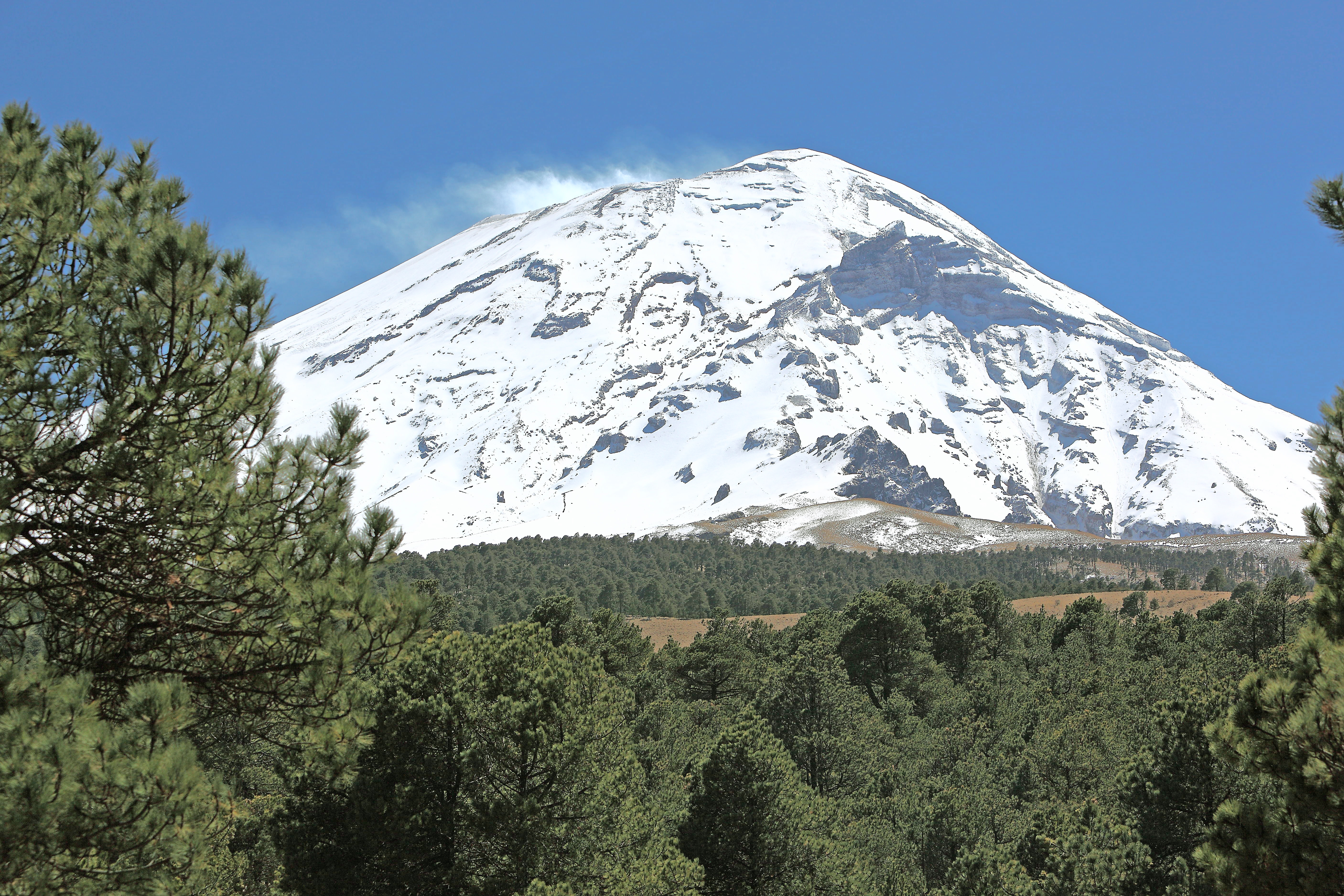
Popocatépetl, one of four volcanoes around which the volcano rabbit lives. Forests of Pinus hartwegii, a species of conifer found in habitats suitable for the rabbit, can be seen around the volcano.

Volcano rabbits are endemic to an area of only 386 square kilometers (149 sq mi) just southeast of Mexico City, in alpine scrublands surrounding four volcanoes (Cerro Tláloc, Popocatépetl, Iztaccíhuatl, and El Pelado). The largest of these volcanic regions is within the Iztaccíhuatl–Popocatépetl National Park, with other areas including the Chichinautzin and Pelado volcanoes. The highly vegetated Altzomoni peak within the park is noted as being able to sustain a notably large volcano rabbit population compared to other regions. Historically, the volcano rabbit likely occupied larger areas within the Trans-Mexican Volcanic Belt and the Sierra Chichinautzin mountain range. The range of the volcano rabbit has since been fragmented into 16 (later 19) individual patches across these volcanoes due to human disturbance. Volcano rabbits are commonly found at altitudes between 3,150 and 3,400 meters (10,330 and 11,150 ft), but can occur anywhere from 2,800 to 4,250 meters (9,190 to 13,940 ft).

The local climate in the volcano rabbit's habitat is temperate and subhumid, with a mean annual temperature of 9.6 °C (49.3 °F). Annual rainfall averages about 1,500 millimeters (59 in). The soil consists mostly of andosols and lithosols, and the vegetation includes varieties from the Nearctic and Neotropical realms, with plants coming from both coniferous forest and tropical communities. This vegetation diversity is attributed to the Trans-Mexican Volcanic Belt acting as a barrier between these realms. The plants Festuca tolucensis and Pinus hartwegii are abundant in volcano rabbit habitats. The species prefers habitats with tall, dense vegetation from a variety of bunch grasses referred to as zacatón, such as Muhlenbergia macroura and Festuca amplissima. Volcano rabbits show strong preferences for thickly vegetated pine, alder, and mixed pine-alder forest habitats. Human activity in the area has had a great impact upon the volcano rabbit's habitat, which highways, farming have fragmented, afforestation, and unsound fire and grazing practices. A study on the effects of climate change upon volcano rabbit populations concluded that fluctuations in climate affected rabbits more on the edge of their habitable range.

The volcano rabbit was once considered to live on the volcano Nevado de Toluca, and a specimen was collected there in 1975 by mammalogist Ticul Álvarez. Research conducted by Jurgen Hoth and colleagues in 1987 found no records of the species there, and noted that it had not been seen in at least 15 years, according to local accounts. There was a sighting of a single rabbit in the region in August 2003, but it was declared extinct within this portion of its range in 2018. Populations exist elsewhere within the Trans-Mexican Volcanic Belt and in captivity. By 2019, the International Union for Conservation of Nature no longer mentioned the Nevado de Toluca as a current or potential site for the distribution of this species.

== Behavior and ecology ==
Volcano rabbit groups consist of between two and five members. The rabbit creates runways similar to those made by microtine rodents to navigate their habitat. Its burrows consist of tunnels with the entrances beneath dense grass clumps or in cracks in the soil, and can have a length of up to 5 meters (16 ft) and depth of up to 40 centimeters (16 in) under the soil's surface. These burrows may have other entrances to allow for escape, and the tunnels often weave around rocks and roots or split into multiple paths. Volcano rabbits may opportunistically use burrows abandoned by other mammals, such as gophers and badgers, as do some other rabbit species. It is particularly reliant on dense grasses for use as cover to make its nests. As it is a slow mover compared to other rabbits, it is more inclined to seek out cover in higher, less open areas, a behavior also seen in the pygmy rabbit (S. idahoensis). The volcano rabbit produces high-pitched vocalizations to warn others in its group of danger, a behavior seen in pikas that is unique among the rabbits. Little is known about its longevity, and it is expected to have an average lifespan of less than a year in the wild, like other rabbits and hares. It has been described as a diurnal animal, and is most active in the evening and early morning. However, large groups of volcano rabbits have been spotted outside their burrows just around noon.

The reproductive behavior of volcano rabbits has been infrequently observed, with most records coming from captive individuals. Males often select a single female from a group to mate with, though when that mate is removed, they choose another. The mating process begins with the male following closely behind its partner until the female turns around, at which point the two start circling each other. After a few turns, the male mounts the female and begins copulation. The species has a very narrow gestational period. In a 1985 study, all females gave birth between 39 and 41 days after coitus; later studies note a gestational period of 39 days. Up to three young are produced per litter, with four to five litters produced per year. The young are weaned when they are roughly 28 days old, and reach sexual maturity after 185 days. The species is sexually active year-round, though the period of greatest activity is during the summer. Their nests, shallow depressions dug in the ground lined with shredded grasses, plant fragments, and fur, are built only from April to September. These nests are 11 centimeters (4 in) in depth and 15 cm (6 in) wide, on average. This nesting behavior is similar to that of female cottontail rabbits. The young are delivered in these nests, similar to burrowing rabbits, which give birth in a nesting chamber. The volcano rabbit has difficulty breeding in captivity when there is little undergrowth, which has been connected to the rabbit's dependence on areas of dense cover.

Female volcano rabbits are more dominant than males, and aggression between females is more violent and more frequent than aggression between males and females. In groups, only female rabbits are dominant, and males are never aggressive towards females. Males may chase each other, but are not known to fight. One observation of captive rabbits noted that the first confrontation between a male and female volcano rabbit resulted in the female attacking the male, with later conflicts being less violent.

=== Diet ===
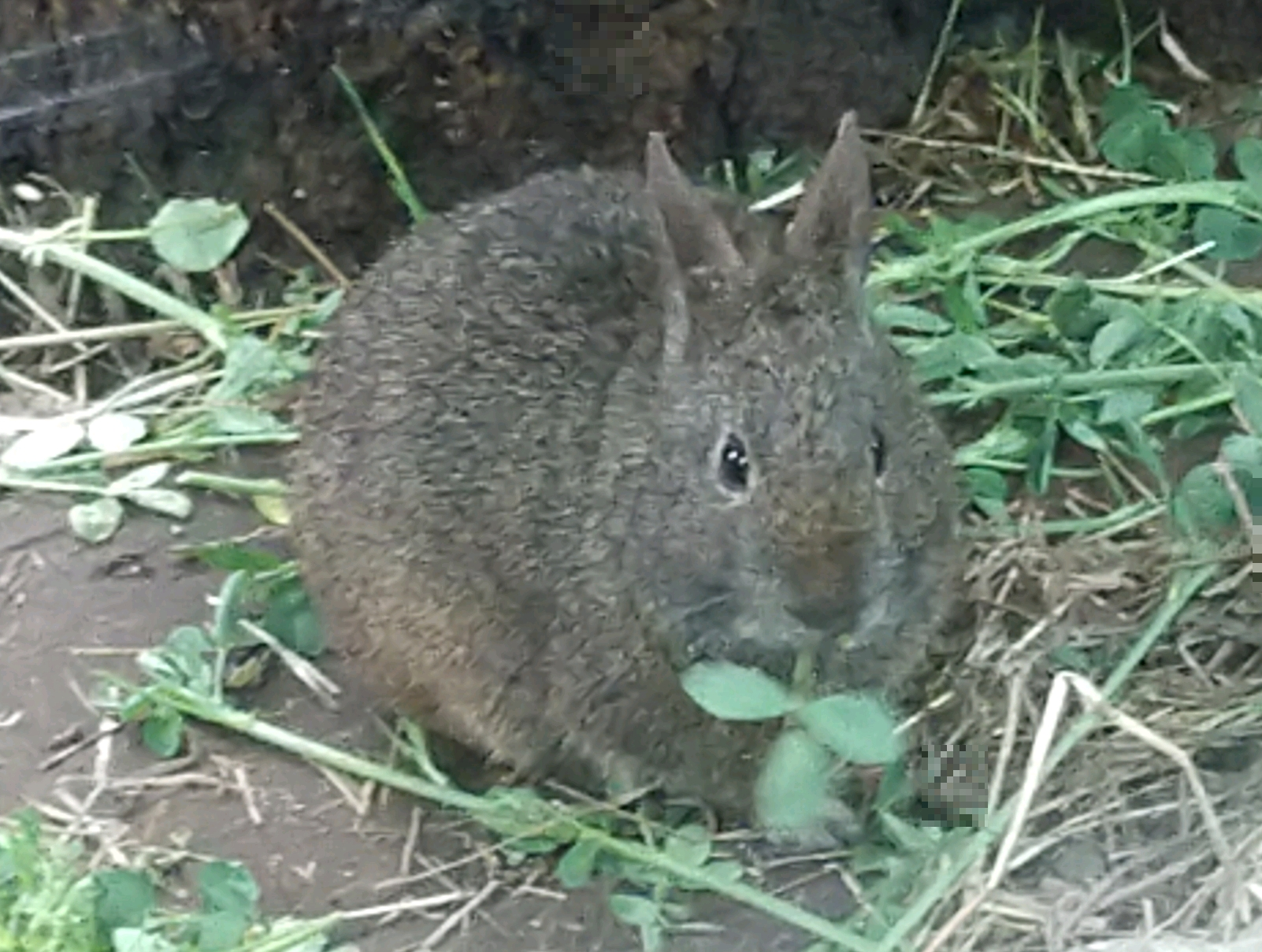
A volcano rabbit feeding

The volcano rabbit feeds primarily on grasses such as Festuca amplissima, Muhlenbergia macroura, Jarava ichu, and Eryngium rosei. The rabbits also use these plants as cover to hide from predators. M. macroura was found in 89% of volcano rabbit pellets in one study, suggesting that this is the base of their diet. By itself, however, this grass does not provide the necessary energy and protein needs of the rabbits; the rest of the rabbit's required nutrition is obtained from other, more easily digestible plant life, including various flowers, seeds, roots, leaves, and bulbs. The volcano rabbit's diet also includes the plants F. tolucensis, Alchemilla sibbaldiifolia, Museniopsis arguta and Cunila tritifolium. Protein acquisition is a limiting factor on population sizes, and regions with more available biomass can support larger populations. In captivity, volcano rabbits have been given pellet food typical for chinchillas, alfalfa hay, and M. macroura grass.

=== Predators and parasites ===
The volcano rabbit is prey for several species; in Iztaccíhuatl–Popocatépetl National Park, it makes up 12.5% of the bobcat's prey and 5.5% of the coyote's. Long-tailed weasels, red-tailed hawks, and rattlesnakes are also significant predators. Feral dogs present around villages may also prey upon the volcano rabbit.

Nematodes, cestodes, fleas, and mites affect the volcano rabbit, several of which are species-specific. It is parasitized by the mites Cheyletiella romerolagi and Cheyletiella parasitovorax, which is notable as there is usually only one species of Cheyletiella mite found on a given host species. Other species-specific parasites are Boreostrongylus romerolagi, Dermatoxys romerolagi, Lamothiella romerolagi, Anoplocephaloides romerolagi, Cediopsylla tepolita, and Hoplopsyllus pectinatus. Ticks (in family Ixodidae), chiggers (in family Trombiculidae), and botfly larvae (in family Cuterebridae) have also been found on wild volcano rabbits.

== Status and conservation ==
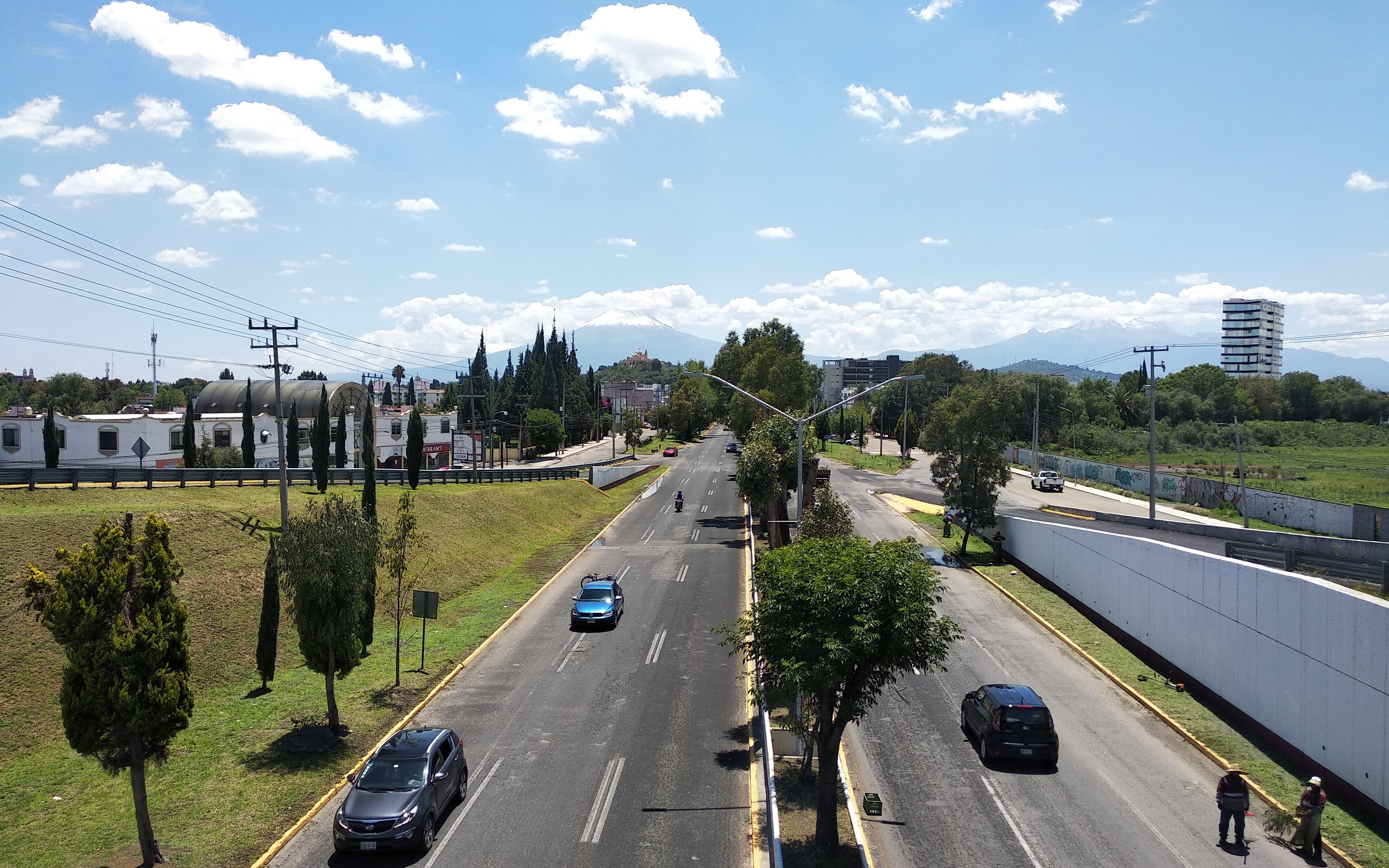
Recta a Cholula, a highway in the Mexican state of Puebla. The construction of similar highways has contributed to declines in volcano rabbit populations due to habitat fragmentation.

The International Union for Conservation of Nature (IUCN) currently lists the volcano rabbit as an endangered species and, in 2019, estimated that roughly 7,000 rabbits remained in the wild, noting that the population was decreasing. Prior studies placed this population number between 11,000 and 25,000 individuals. The Mexican government, through the Secretariat of Environment and Natural Resources, also lists the species as endangered.

=== Threats and decline ===
Studies conducted during the 1980s and 1990s agreed that human and natural causes have contributed to the volcano rabbit's habitat becoming smaller and have made it more fragmented. The rabbit's range has shrunk significantly over the last 18,000 years due to a 5–6 °C (9.0–11 °F) increase in temperature, and may now be only 10% of its former size. Habitat fragmentation is a common cause of population decline in Mexican mammals, and the volcano rabbit is particularly affected due to its specific habitat and diet needs. Patches of vegetation R. diazi uses for survival are becoming more isolated and smaller, rendering the environment more open and therefore less suitable for its survival. Because the volcano rabbit inhabits the area surrounding Mexico City, a highly populated urban zone, its habitat suffers from rapid agricultural and urban expansion. Agricultural developments such as increased logging, grass harvesting and livestock grazing are cited as detrimental to R. diazi populations, as are unsound management policies of its habitat in national parks and outside, mainly by afforestation and the digging of ineffective water infiltration ditches.

Human disturbances enable cottontail rabbits to expand into regions once occupied by the volcano rabbit. However, it is unclear whether the volcano rabbit is being pushed into mountain habitats due to competition with other species. This replacement may be driven more by habitat requirements rather than one rabbit species being driven out by others. Cottontail rabbits are essentially crepuscular, as opposed to the volcano rabbit's diurnal behavior, which lessens the possibility of direct competition between species, and these species have been observed in sympatry with each other in some cases. Climate change has been cited as a potentially damaging factor to the volcano rabbit, as increasing temperature causes the species to move to higher elevations where the habitat is less suitable overall.

Hunting is another threat to the volcano rabbit, even though R. diazi is listed under Appendix 1 of CITES, a treaty that severely restricts the trade of listed species. Under Mexican law, it is illegal to hunt the volcano rabbit, but regions inhabited by the volcano rabbit have been largely abandoned by law enforcement, and the law protecting the rabbit is poorly enforced. The species is hunted even though its small size and rough fur make it an inferior source of meat and skins. Hunting, livestock grazing, and fires can harm R. diazi even within the boundaries of national parks; wildfires around grassland areas in particular can cause extinction of small populations, though the regions burned are often quickly repopulated if undisturbed by human activity and if Muhlenbergia macroura is present.

=== Conservation ===
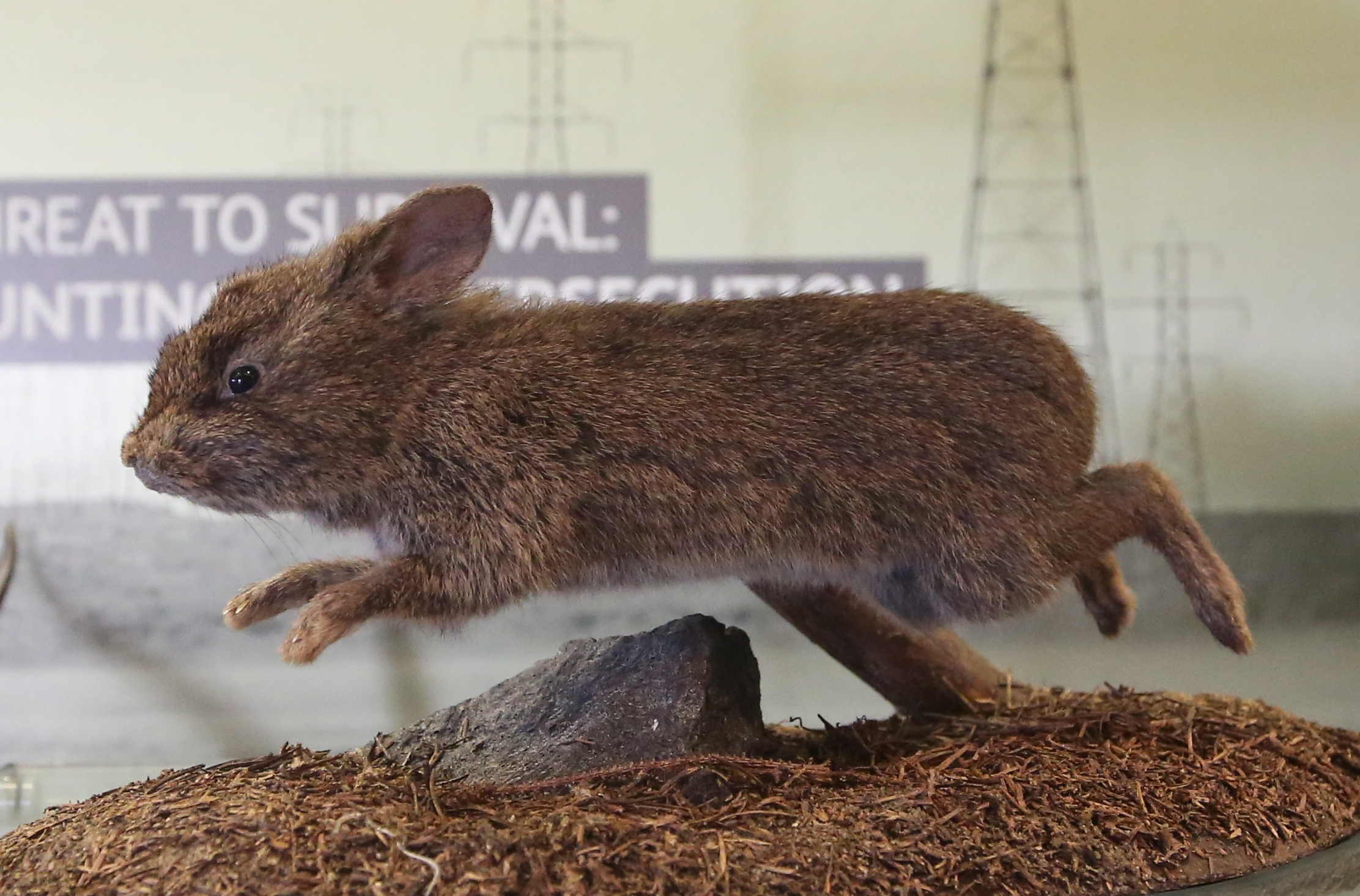
A taxidermied female volcano rabbit born in Jersey Zoo in the mid-1980s

Captive breeding has been attempted to establish colonies of the volcano rabbit. One of the first attempts to do so was by British naturalist Gerald Durrell in 1968. However, the colony failed, as the only male successfully brought to Durrell's zoo on Jersey died of coccidiosis and produced only a litter of four young, all of which were female. Since then, further attempts have been met with varying success, but captive-bred infants have high mortality. The only breeding group in captivity, in Chapultepec Zoo, began with a small number of rabbits, and over the course of 20 generations has lost genetic diversity in comparison with the wild population.

The IUCN created an action plan for the volcano rabbit in 1990 that proposed several measures to conserve the species. The plan emphasized grassland and protected area management, increased public awareness and education, and noted that the species should not be considered for use as a laboratory animal, as this could endanger wild populations as demand increases. A more extensive plan was proposed in the 1994 book El Conejo Zacatuche, tan lejos de Dios y tan cerca de la Ciudad de México ('The Zacatuche Rabbit, so far from God and so close to Mexico City'), which included natural history information on the species and other lagomorphs, the impact humans have on the volcano rabbit, and proposed remedial actions, but by 2018 no part of the plan had been implemented. Some populations have been able to recover due to volcanic activity at Popocatépetl, which has restricted incursions by herders and tourists.
