= Peperomia tancitaroana =

Scientific classification
- Kingdom: Plantae
- Clade: Tracheophytes
- Clade: Angiosperms
- Clade: Magnoliids
- Order: Piperales
- Family: Piperaceae
- Genus: Peperomia
- Species: P. tancitaroana

Binomial name
- Peperomia tancitaroana Trel. ex Viccon & G.Mathieu

Species of flowering plant

Peperomia tancitaroana is a species of flowering plant in the genus Peperomia. It was first described by William Trelease but did not satisfy the rules for valid publication. It was later described by José Viccon‑Esquivel & Guido Mathieu and published in the book "Phytotaxa 458(1): 72-75, f. 1, 3, 4. 2020. (28 Aug 2020)". It primarily grows on seasonally dry tropical biome. The species name came from Tancítaro, where first specimens of this species were collected.

== Distribution ==
It is endemic to Mexico. First specimens where found at an altitude of 2000 meters in Tancítaro.

- Mexico
  - Guerrero
  - Jalisco
  - Michoacán
    - Tancítaro
