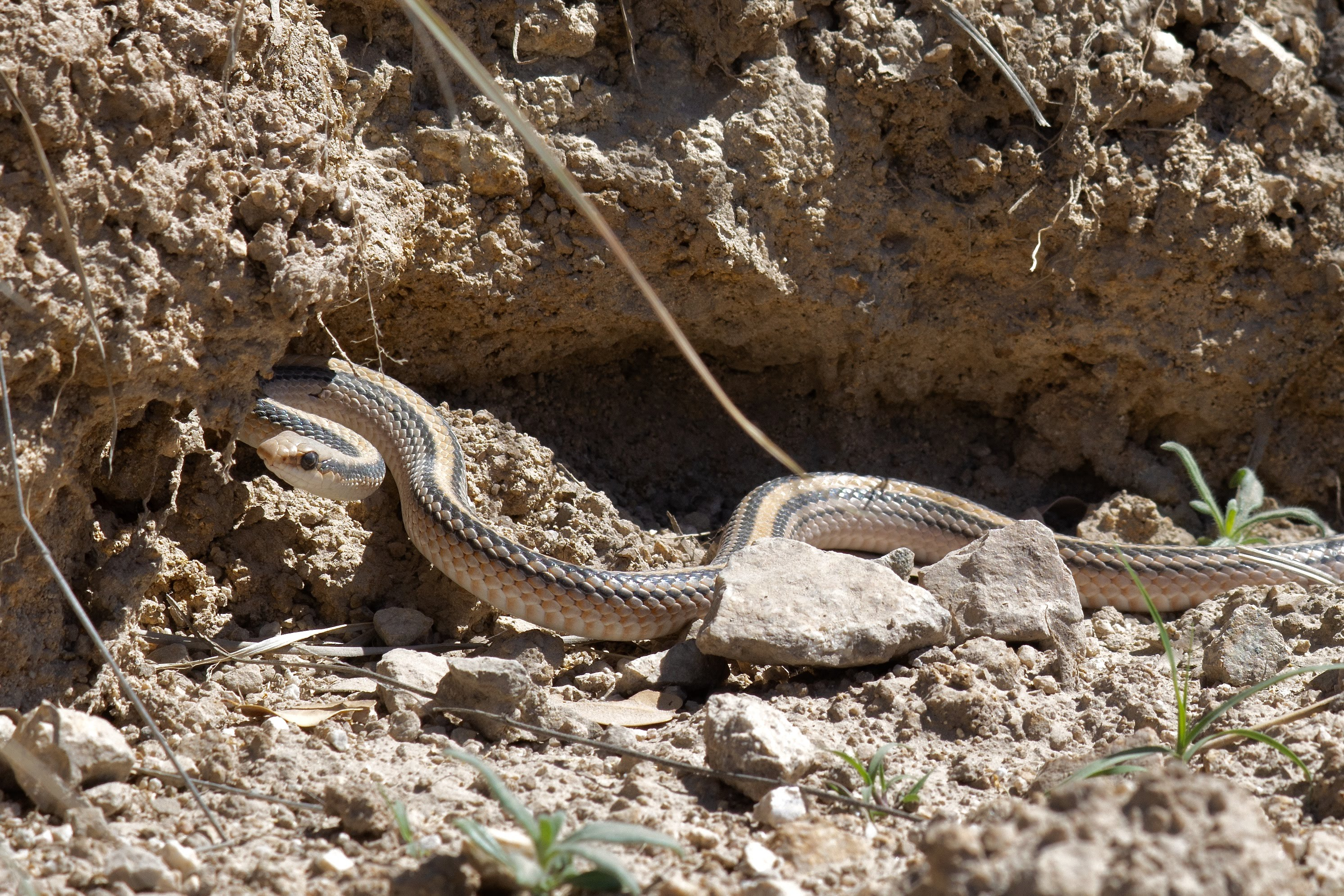

Conservation status
- Least Concern (IUCN 3.1)

Scientific classification
- Kingdom: Animalia
- Phylum: Chordata
- Class: Reptilia
- Order: Squamata
- Suborder: Serpentes
- Family: Colubridae
- Genus: Salvadora
- Species: S. hexalepis

Binomial name
- Salvadora hexalepis (Cope, 1866)
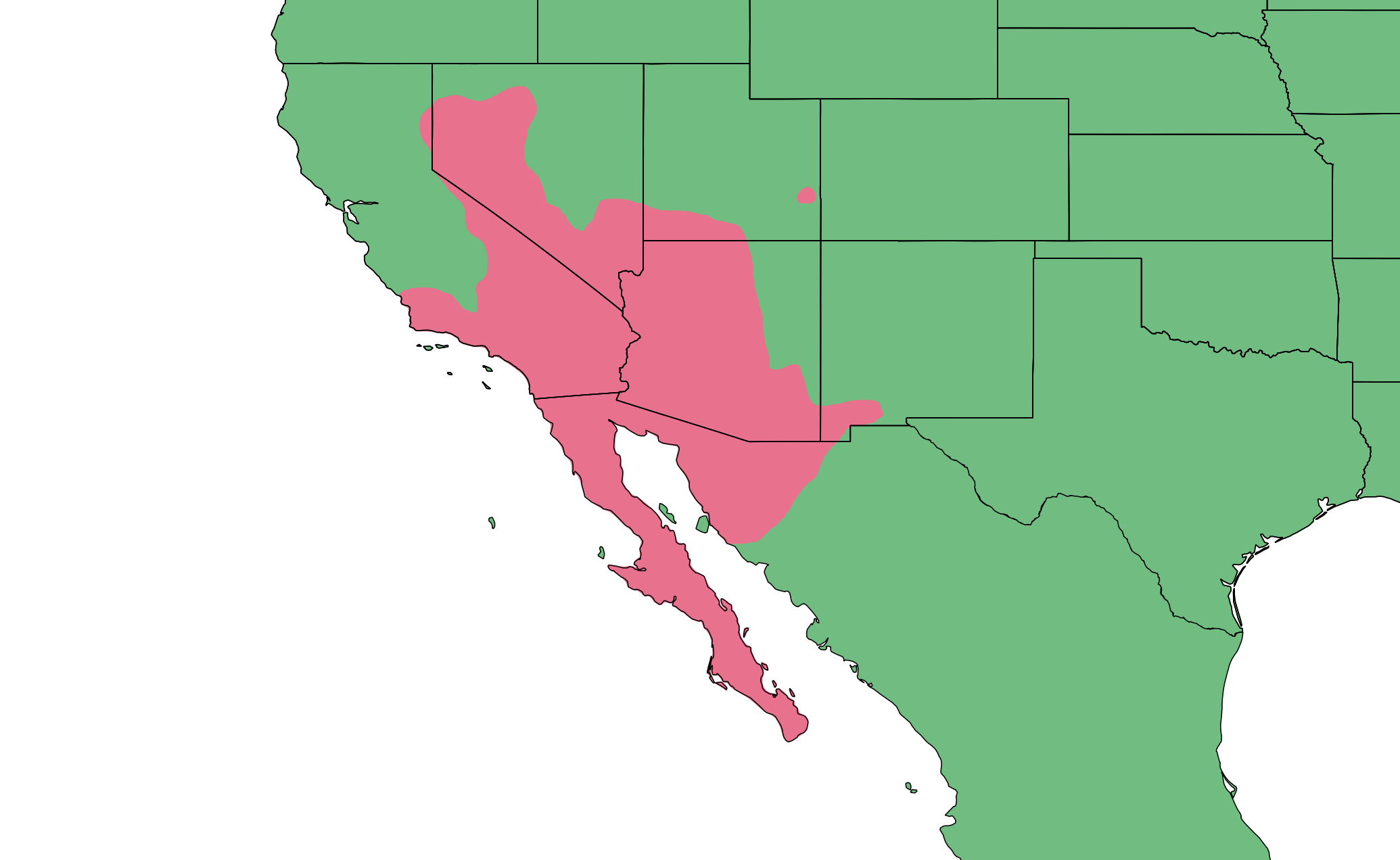

Synonyms
- Phimothyra hexalepis Cope, 1866; Zamenis grahamiæ Var. hexalepis — Boulenger, 1896; Salvadora hexalepis — Stejneger, 1902

= Salvadora hexalepis =

Western patch-nosed snake

Species of snake

Salvadora hexalepis, the western patch-nosed snake, is a species of non-venomous colubrid snake, which is endemic to the southwestern United States and northern Mexico.

== Geographic range ==
It is found in the southwestern United States in the states of Arizona, southern California, Nevada, southern New Mexico, and southwestern Texas. It is also found in northern Mexico in the Mexican states of Baja California, Baja California Sur, Chihuahua, Sinaloa, and Sonora.

== Subspecies ==
The following four subspecies are recognized, along with their geographic ranges:

Common Name	Scientific Name	Geographic Range
Desert Patchnose Snake	Salvadora hexalepis hexalepis (Cope, 1866)	Southwest Arizona, southeast California, northeast Baja California, northwest Chihuahua.
Baja California Patchnose Snake	Salvadora hexalepis klauberi Bogert, 1945	Southern Baja California, and the entirety of Baja California Sur.
Mojave Patchnose Snake	Salvadora hexalepis mojavensis Bogert, 1945	Southeast California, northwest Arizona, western Nevada, and a tiny section of southwest Utah.
Coast Patchnose Snake	Salvadora hexalepis virgultea Bogert, 1935	Southern California and northwest Baja California.

== Description ==
At the end of the video, the snake feels threatened and strikes.

Adults of Salvadora hexalepis are, on average, 20-46 inches (51–117 cm) in total length; the record total length is 58 in (150 cm).

They have a distinctive, thick scale curved back over the top of the snout, and free at the edges.

All subspecies are yellowish with blackish lateral stripes in various arrangements.

The dorsal scales are smooth, and the anal plate is divided.

== Behavior ==
The western patch-nosed snake inhabits arid deserts in its area. It feeds upon lizards, snakes, reptile eggs, and small rodents.

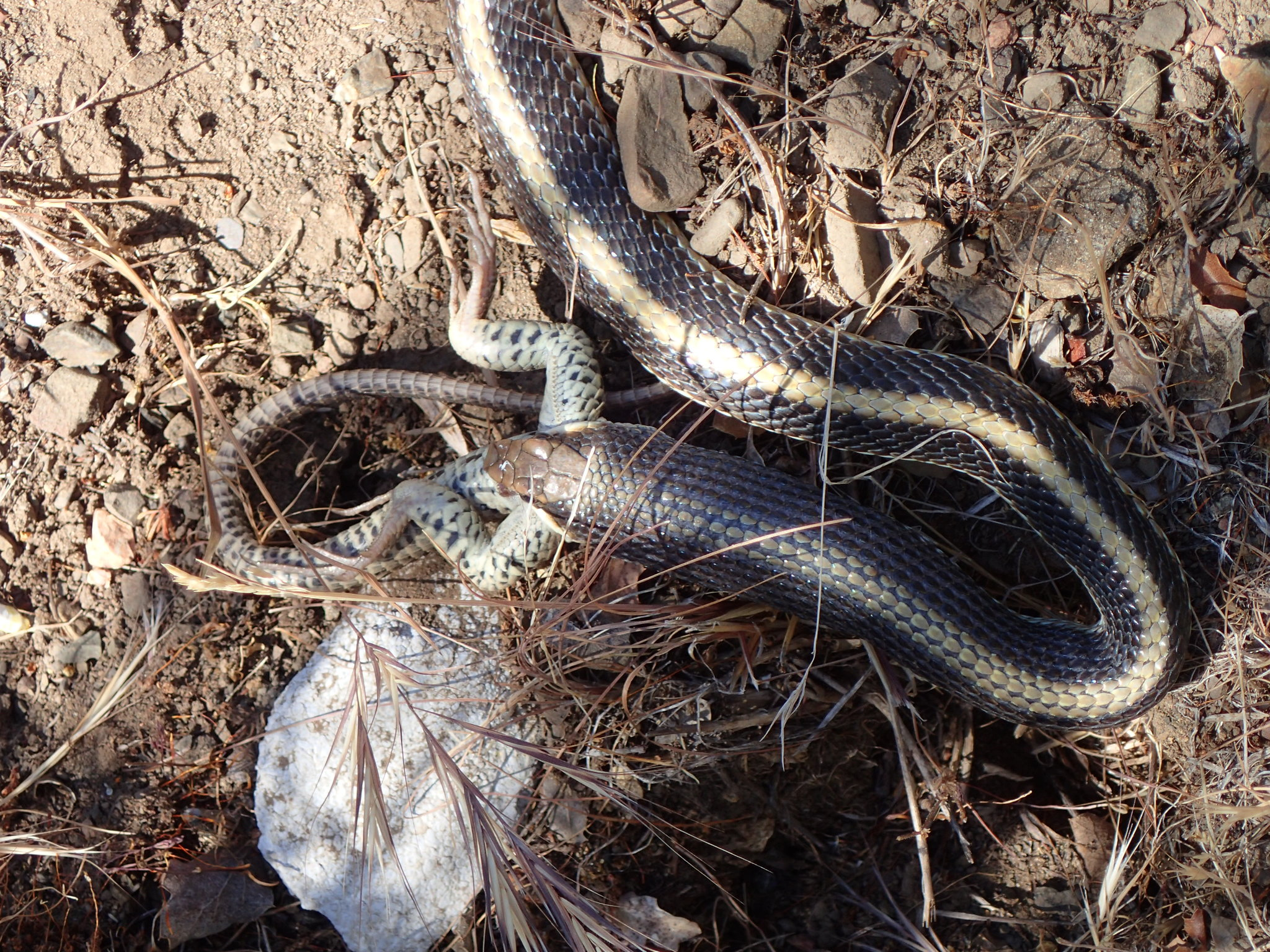
Eating a western whiptail

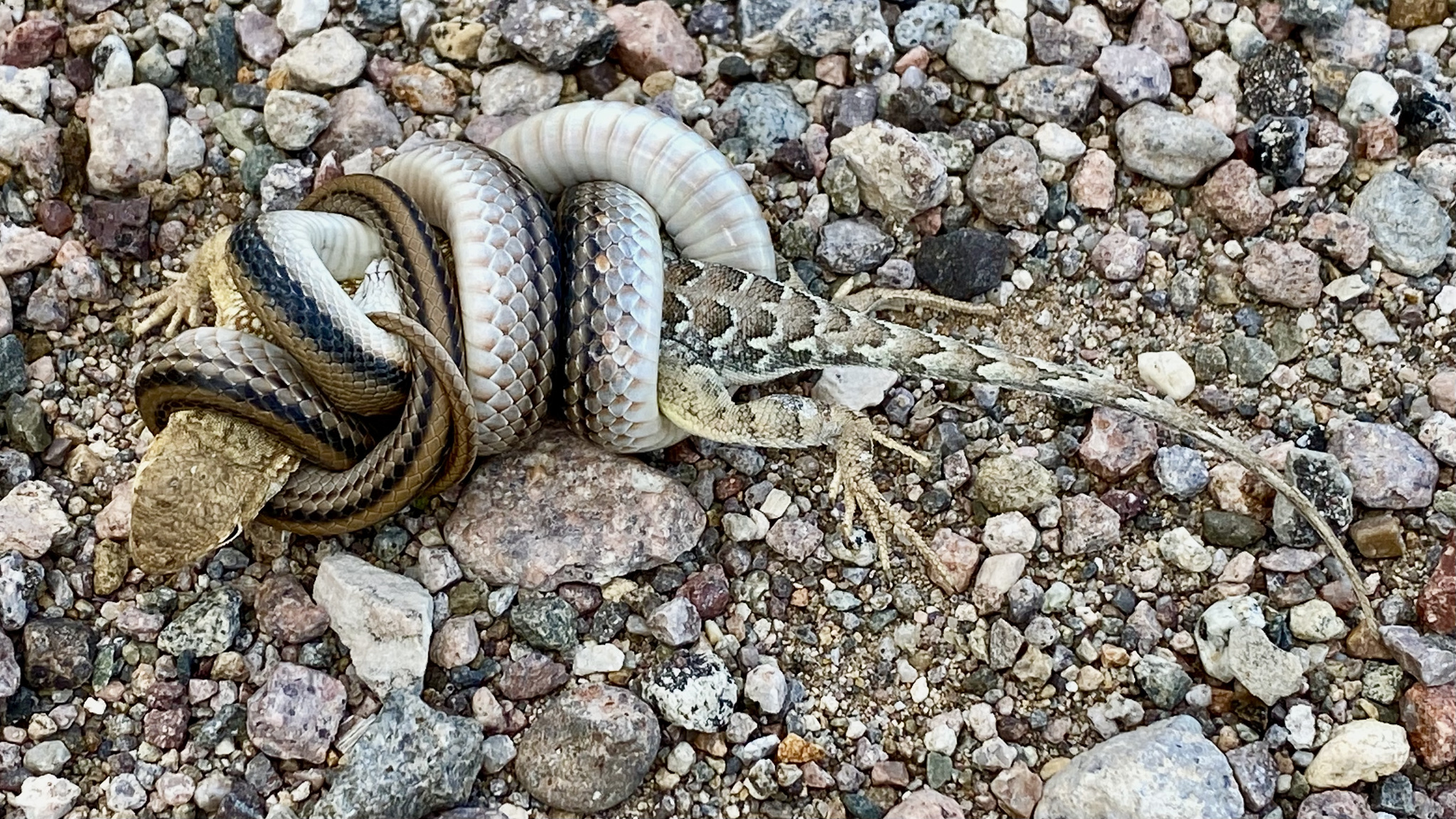
Eating an elegant earless lizard

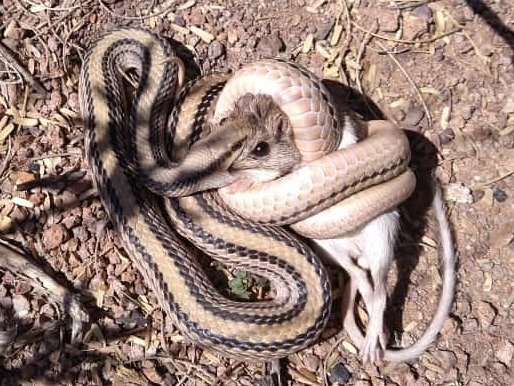
Eating a rodent

== Reproduction ==
4-10 eggs are laid during spring or early summer and hatch in August through September.
