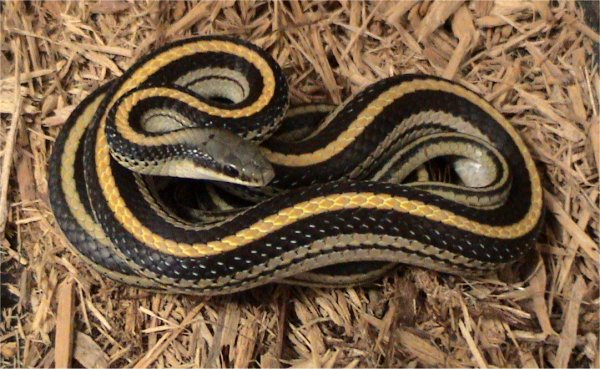
- Texas patchnose snake Salvadora lineata

Scientific classification
- Kingdom: Animalia
- Phylum: Chordata
- Class: Reptilia
- Order: Squamata
- Suborder: Serpentes
- Family: Colubridae
- Subfamily: Colubrinae
- Genus: Salvadora; Baird & Girard, 1853

= Salvadora (snake) =

Genus of snakes

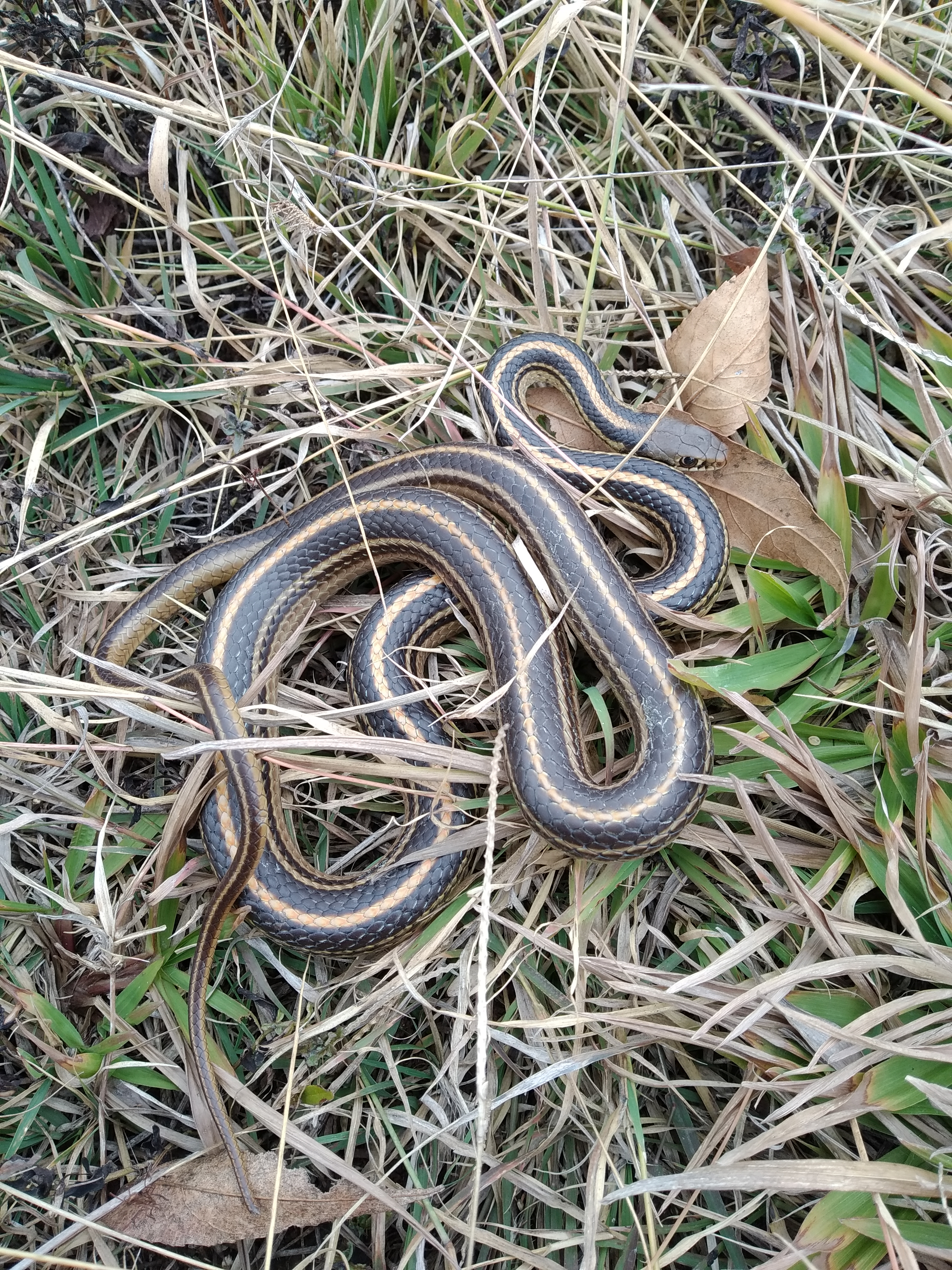
Salvadora bairdi

Salvadora is a genus of colubrid snakes commonly called patchnose snakes or patch-nosed snakes, which are endemic to the western United States and Mexico. They are characterized by having a distinctive scale on the tip of the snout.

== Species and subspecies ==
The following species and subspecies are recognized as being valid.

- Salvadora bairdi Jan, 1860 – Baird's patchnose snake
- Salvadora deserticola Schmidt, 1940 – Big Bend patchnose snake
- Salvadora grahamiae Baird & Girard, 1853 – mountain patchnose snake
- Salvadora gymnorhachis Hernández-Jiménez, Flores-Villela & Campbell, 2019
- Salvadora hexalepis (Cope, 1866) – western patchnose snake
  - Salvadora hexalepis hexalepis (Cope, 1866) – desert patchnose snake
  - Salvadora hexalepis klauberi Bogert, 1945 – Baja California patchnose snake
  - Salvadora hexalepis mojavensis Bogert, 1945 – Mojave patchnose snake
  - Salvadora hexalepis virgultea Bogert, 1935 – coast patchnose snake
- Salvadora intermedia Hartweg, 1940 – Oaxacan patchnose snake
- Salvadora lemniscata (Cope, 1895) – Pacific patchnose snake
- Salvadora lineata Schmidt, 1940 – Texas patchnose snake
- Salvadora mexicana (A.M.C. Duméril, Bibron & A.H.A. Duméril, 1854) – Mexican patchnose snake
