= Salvadora gymnorhachis =

Scientific classification
- Kingdom: Animalia
- Phylum: Chordata
- Class: Reptilia
- Order: Squamata
- Suborder: Serpentes
- Family: Colubridae
- Genus: Salvadora
- Species: S. gymnorhachis

Binomial name
- Salvadora gymnorhachis Hernández-Jiménez, Flores-Villela & Campbell, 2019

Species of snake

Salvadora gymnorhachis is a species of snake in the subfamily Colubrinae of the family Colubridae. The species is endemic to Mexico.

== Geographic range ==
S. gymnorhachis is found in the Mexican state of Oaxaca.

== Description ==
S. gymnorhachis differs from all other species of Salvadora by having the pale vertebral stripe absent, and the dorsolateral stripes confined to the anterior portion of the body.
