= Salvadora intermedia =

Conservation status
- Least Concern (IUCN 3.1)

Scientific classification
- Kingdom: Animalia
- Phylum: Chordata
- Class: Reptilia
- Order: Squamata
- Suborder: Serpentes
- Family: Colubridae
- Genus: Salvadora
- Species: S. intermedia

Binomial name
- Salvadora intermedia Hartweg, 1940

Species of snake

Salvadora intermedia, the Oaxacan patchnose snake, is a species of snake of the family Colubridae.

The snake is found in Mexico.
