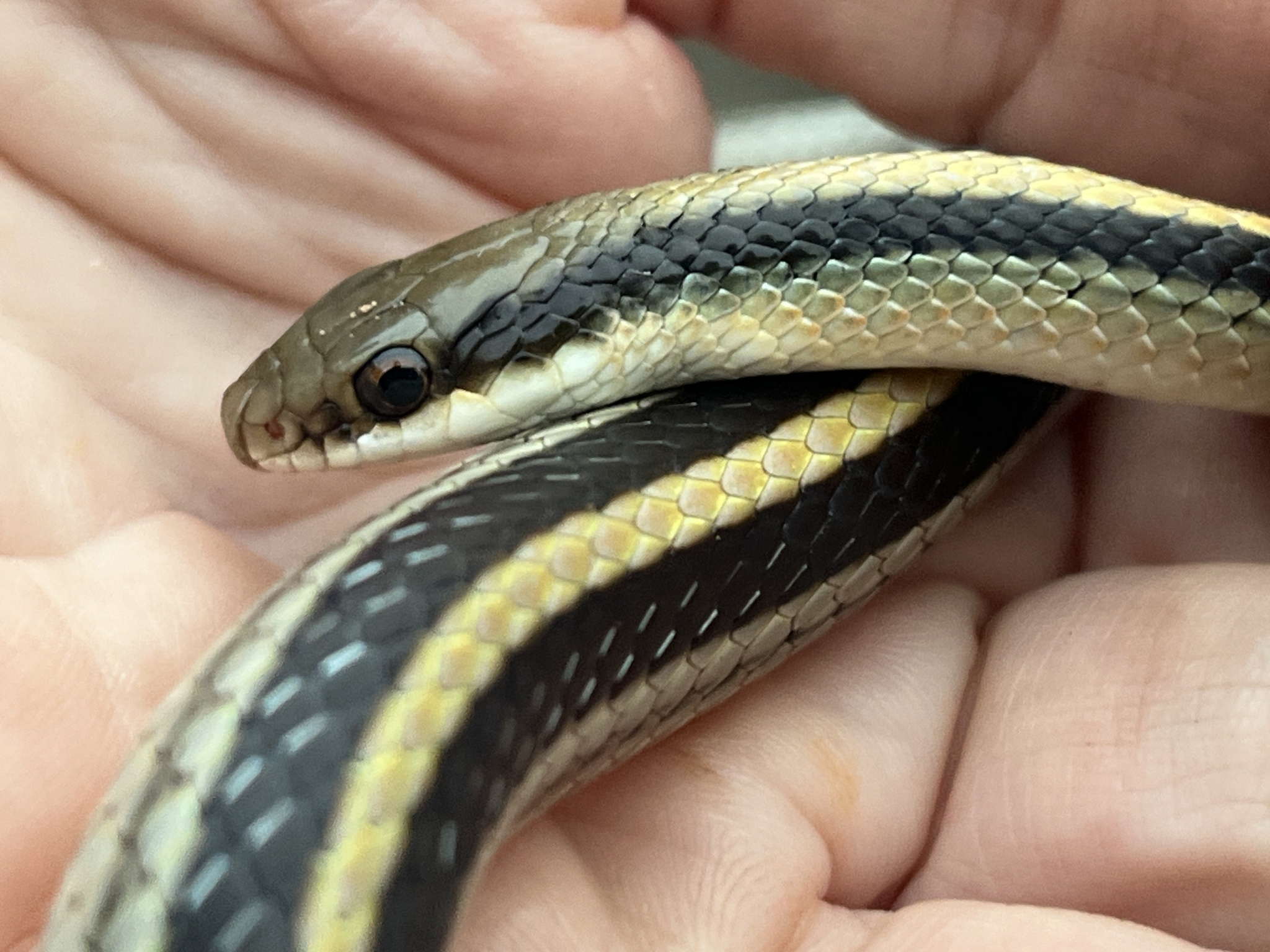

Scientific classification
- Kingdom: Animalia
- Phylum: Chordata
- Class: Reptilia
- Order: Squamata
- Suborder: Serpentes
- Family: Colubridae
- Genus: Salvadora
- Species: S. lineata

Binomial name
- Salvadora lineata Schmidt, 1940

= Salvadora lineata =

Species of snake

Salvadora lineata, the Texas patchnose snake, is a species of snake of the family Colubridae.

The snake is found in the United States and Mexico.

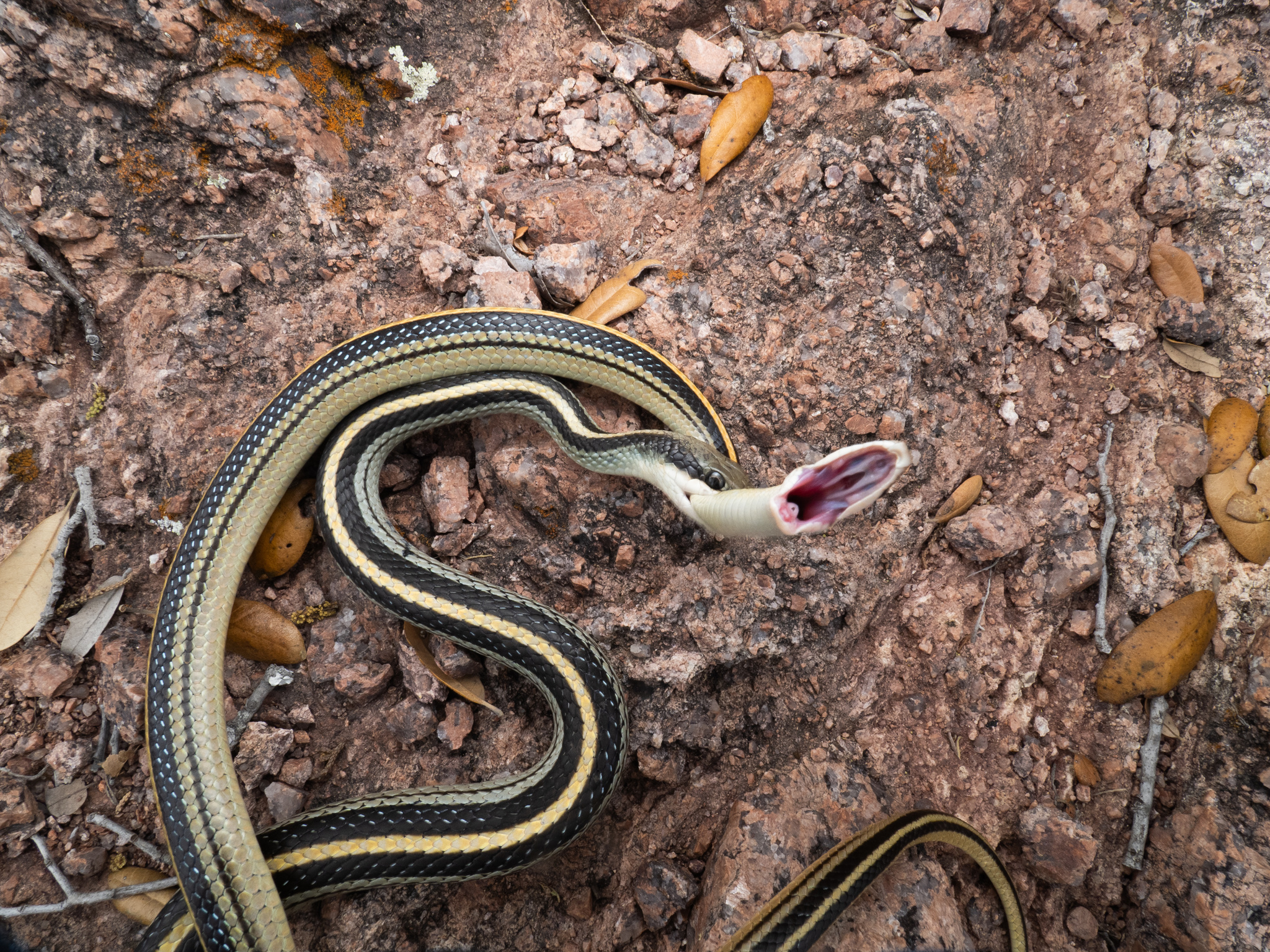
Mating

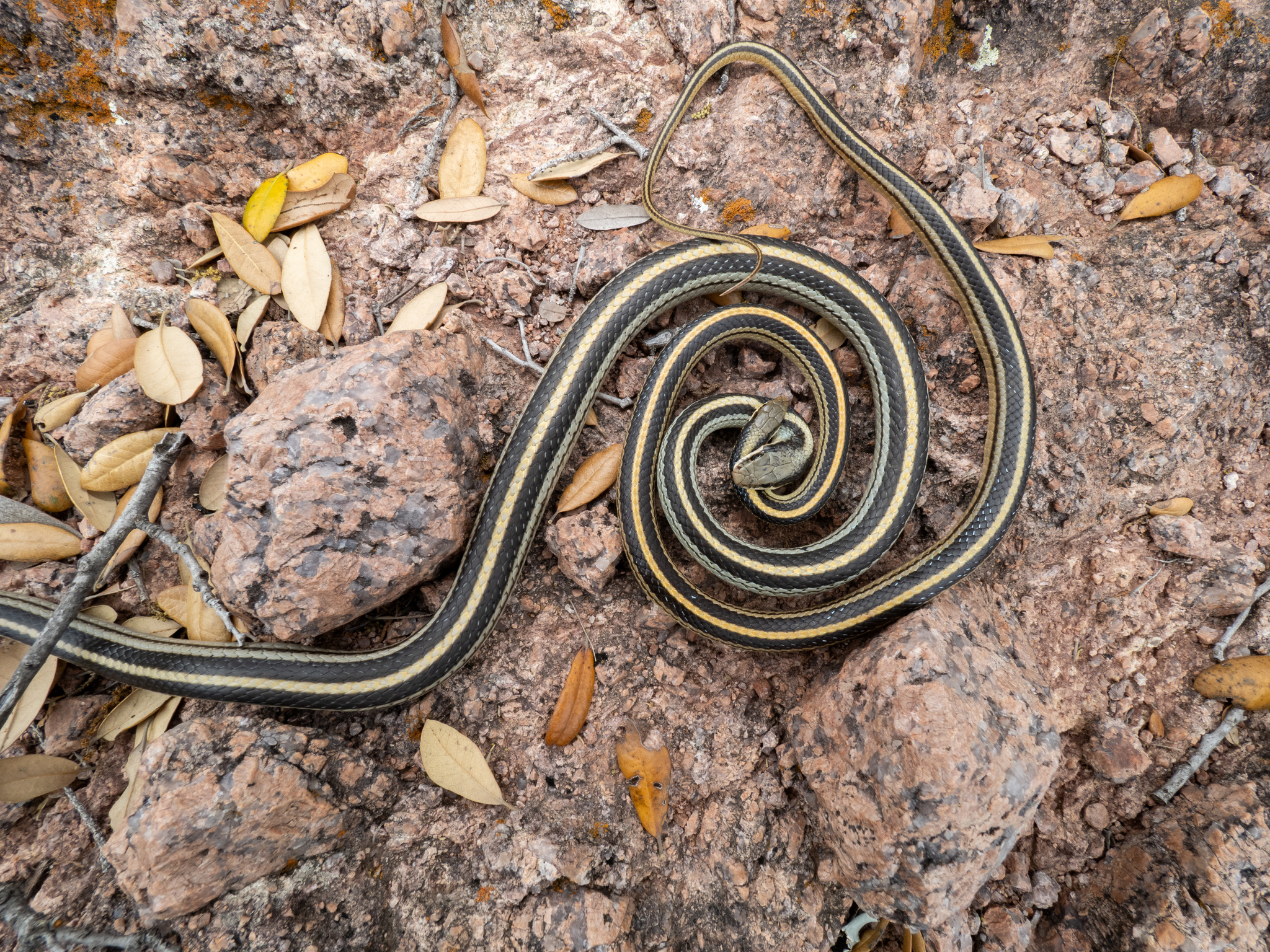
Mating

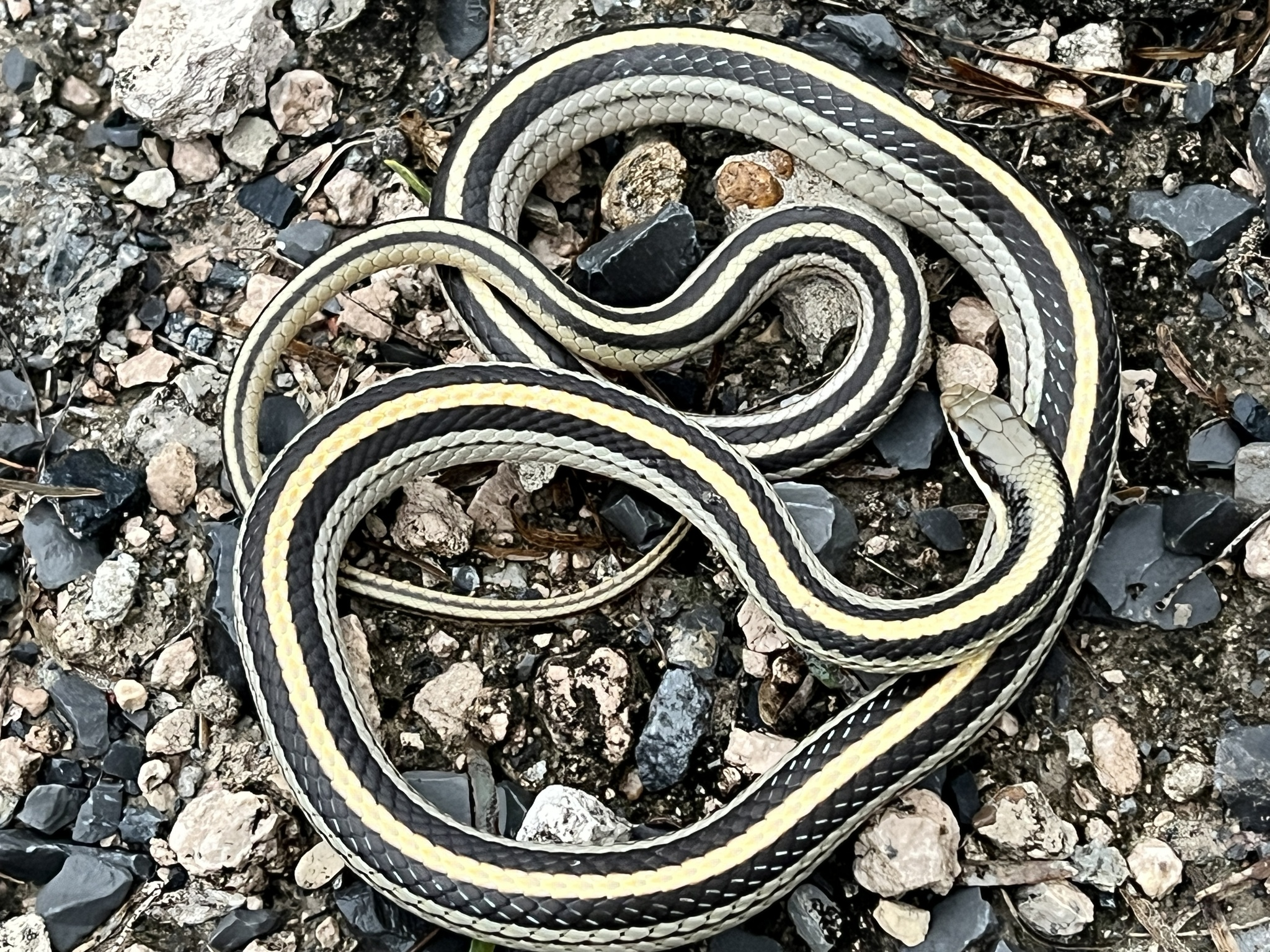

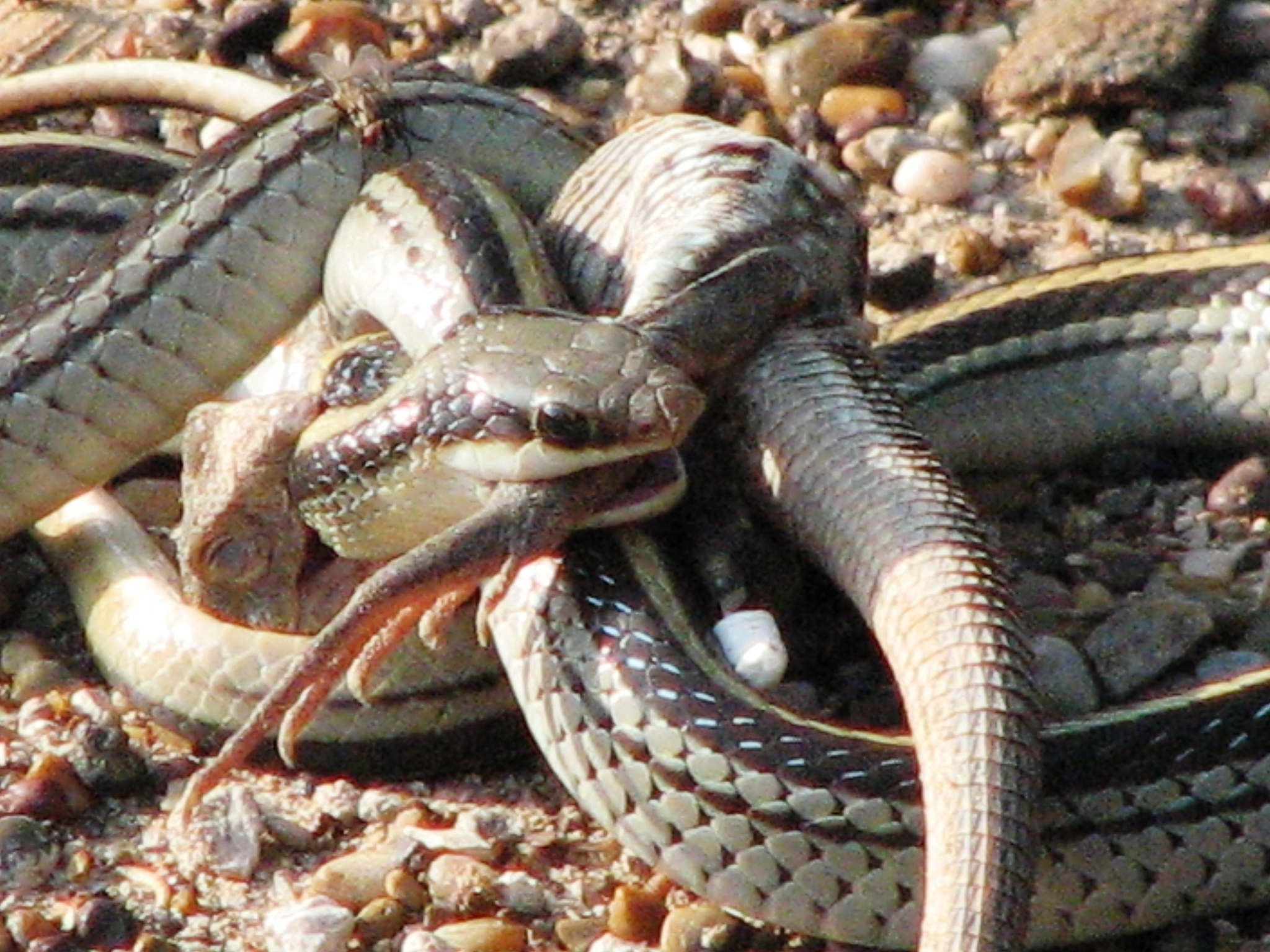
Eating a lizard
