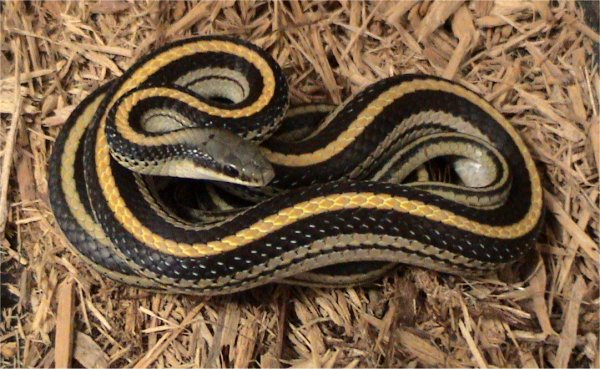

Conservation status
- Least Concern (IUCN 3.1)

Scientific classification
- Kingdom: Animalia
- Phylum: Chordata
- Class: Reptilia
- Order: Squamata
- Suborder: Serpentes
- Family: Colubridae
- Genus: Salvadora
- Species: S. grahamiae

Binomial name
- Salvadora grahamiae Baird & Girard, 1853
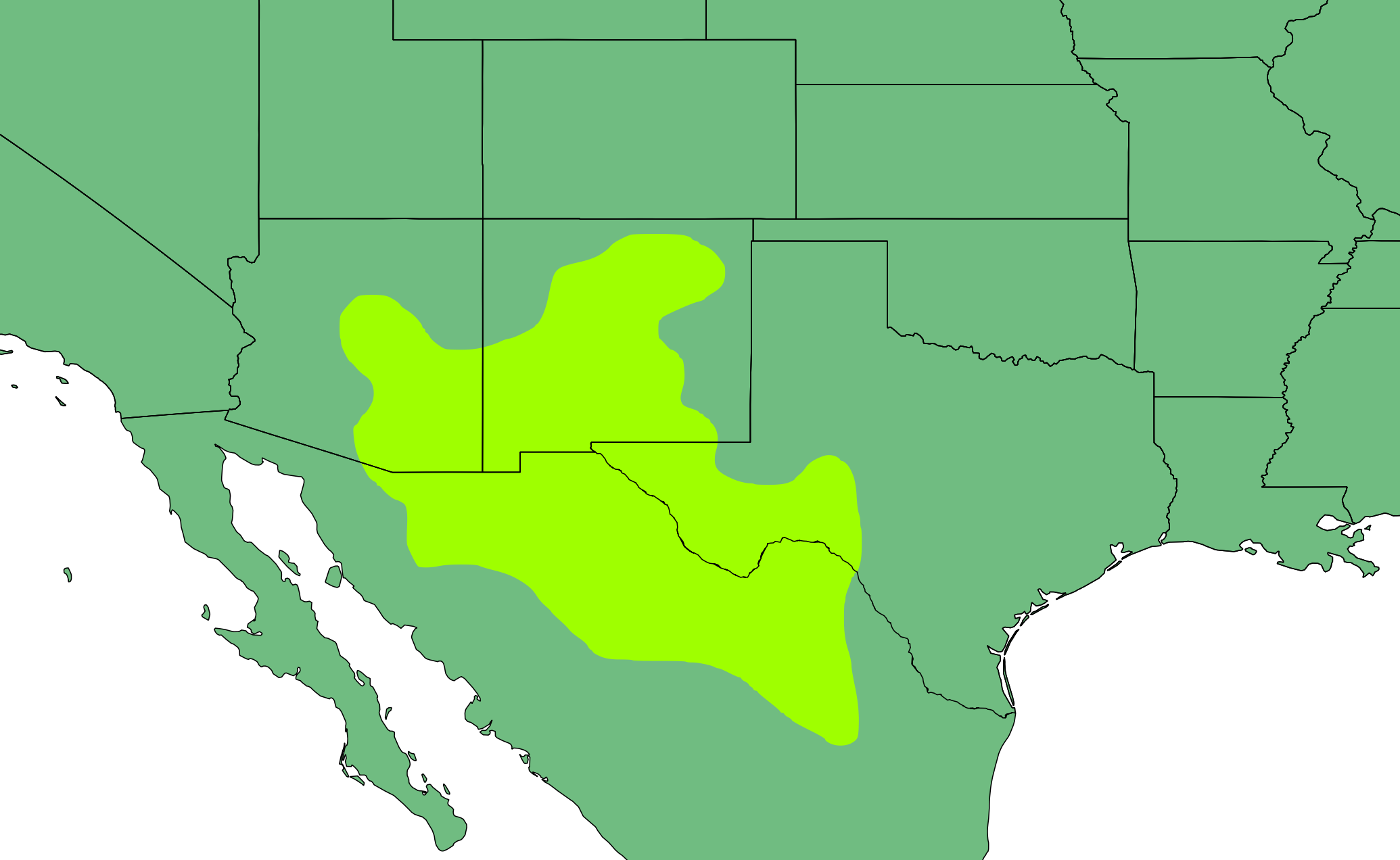

Synonyms
- Salvadora grahamiae Baird & Girard, 1853; Phimothyra grahamiae — Cope, 1879; Salvadora grahamiae — Garman, 1884

= Salvadora grahamiae =

Species of snake

Salvadora grahamiae, also known commonly as the eastern patch-nosed snake and the mountain patchnose snake, is a species of snake in the family Colubridae. The species is native to the southwestern United States and adjacent northeastern Mexico.

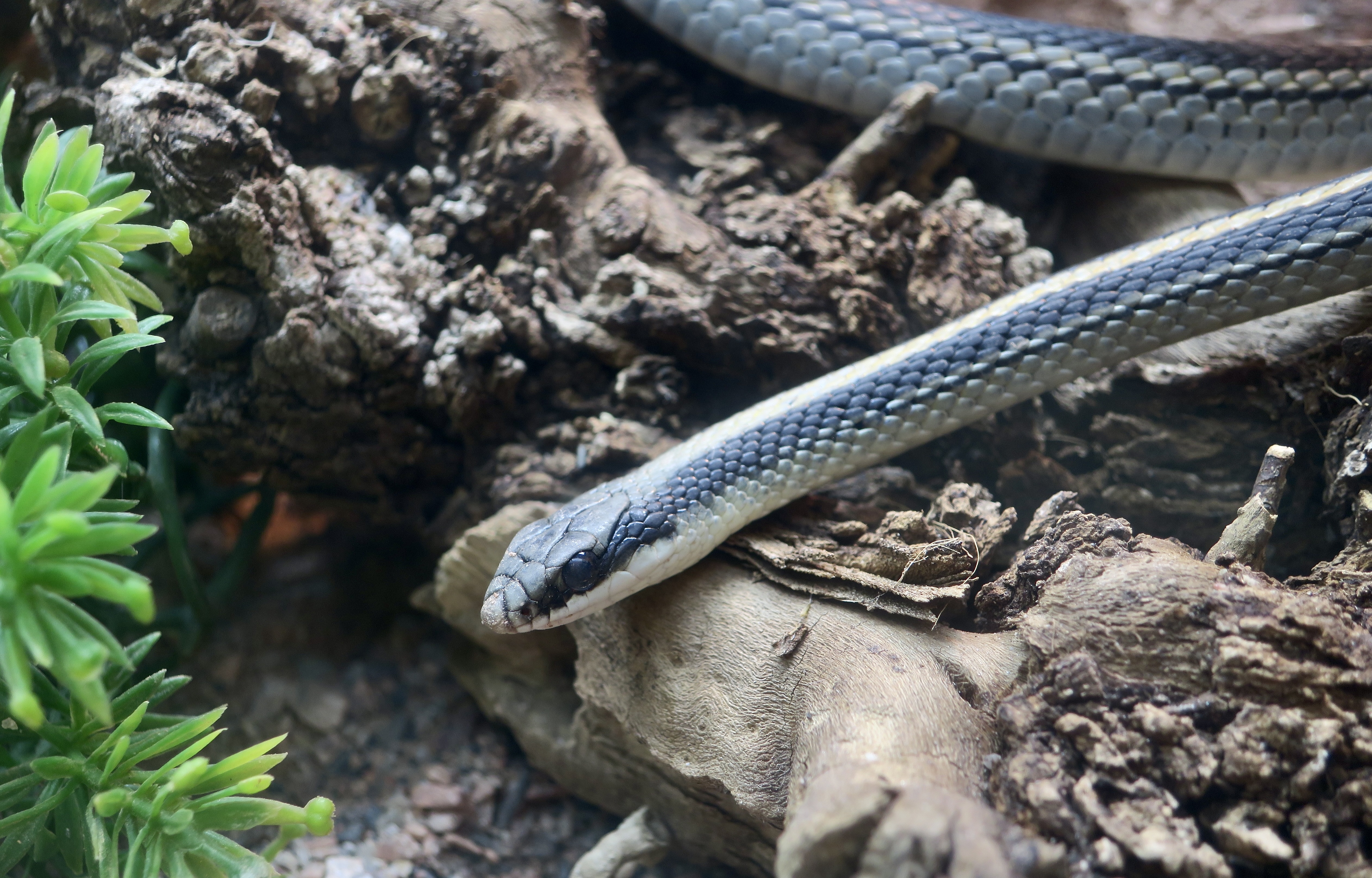
A mountain patchnose snake at Phoenix Zoo.

== Etymology ==
The specific name, grahamiae, is in honor of Colonel James Duncan Graham, United States Army Corps of Topographical Engineers.

== Geographic range ==
S. grahamiae is found in the US states of Arizona, New Mexico, and Texas, and in the Mexican states of Chihuahua, Coahuila, Querétaro, Tamaulipas, and Veracruz.

== Habitat ==
S. grahamiae occurs in a wide variety of habitats including forest, savanna, shrubland, grassland, and desert, at altitudes from sea level to 1,980 m (6,500 ft).

== Description ==
S. grahamiae may attain a total length (including tail) of 47 in (120 cm). It has eight upper labials. The posterior chin shields touch or are separated by only one small scale.

== Diet ==
S. grahamiae preys predominately upon lizards, especially those of the genus Aspidoscelis. It also eats reptile eggs, small snakes, nestling birds, and small mammals.

== Reproduction ==
S. grahamiae is oviparous. Eggs are laid in April–June, and clutch size is 5–10.
