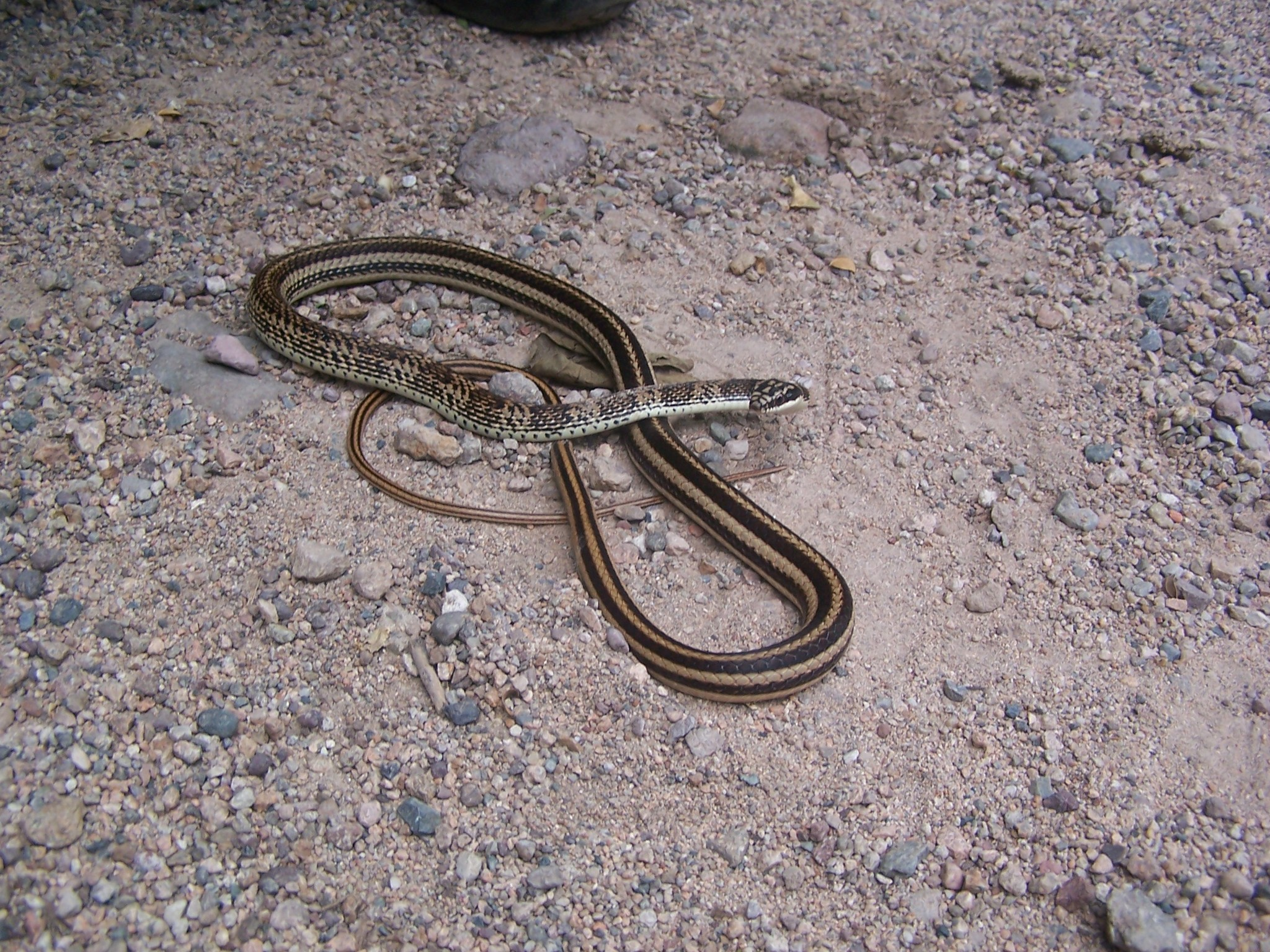

Conservation status
- Least Concern (IUCN 3.1)

Scientific classification
- Kingdom: Animalia
- Phylum: Chordata
- Class: Reptilia
- Order: Squamata
- Suborder: Serpentes
- Family: Colubridae
- Genus: Salvadora
- Species: S. mexicana

Binomial name
- Salvadora mexicana (Duméril, Bibron, & A.H.A. Duméril, 1854)

= Salvadora mexicana =

Species of snake

Salvadora mexicana, the Mexican patchnose snake, is a species of snake of the family Colubridae.

The snake is found in Mexico.
