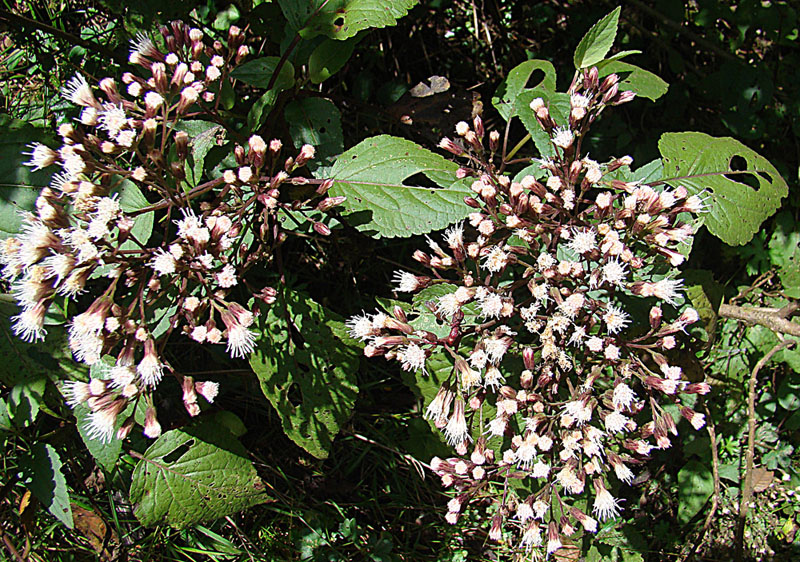
- Archibaccharis schiedeana near Dota, Costa Rica

Scientific classification
- Kingdom: Plantae
- Clade: Tracheophytes
- Clade: Angiosperms
- Clade: Eudicots
- Clade: Asterids
- Order: Asterales
- Family: Asteraceae
- Genus: Archibaccharis
- Species: A. schiedeana

Binomial name
- Archibaccharis schiedeana (Benth.) J.D.Jacks.

Synonyms
- Archibaccharis torquis (S.F. Blake) S.F. Blake; Baccharis elegans Kunth; Baccharis elegans var. seemannii Sch.; Baccharis scandens Less.; Baccharis schiedeana Benth.; Baccharis schiedeana Oerst.; Baccharis thomasii Klatt; Hemibaccharis torquis S.F.Blake; Neomolina elegans (Kunth) F.H. Hellwig

= Archibaccharis schiedeana =

Species of flowering plant

Archibaccharis schiedeana is a species of shrubs in the family Asteraceae. It is native from Mexico to Panama.
