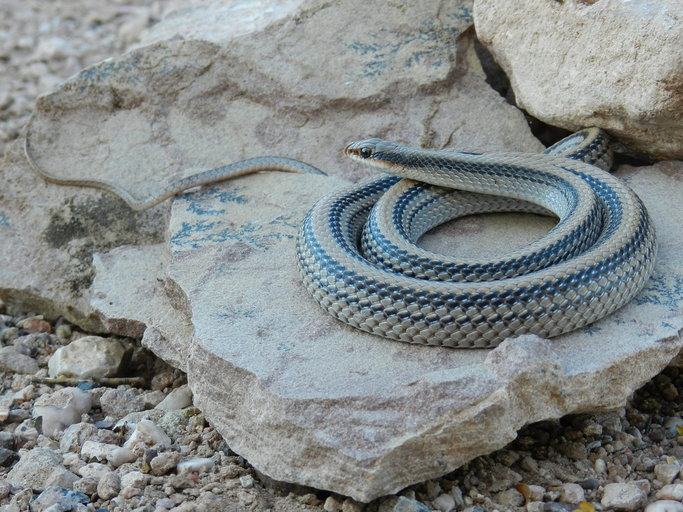

Scientific classification
- Kingdom: Animalia
- Phylum: Chordata
- Class: Reptilia
- Order: Squamata
- Suborder: Serpentes
- Family: Colubridae
- Genus: Salvadora
- Species: S. deserticola

Binomial name
- Salvadora deserticola Schmidt, 1940
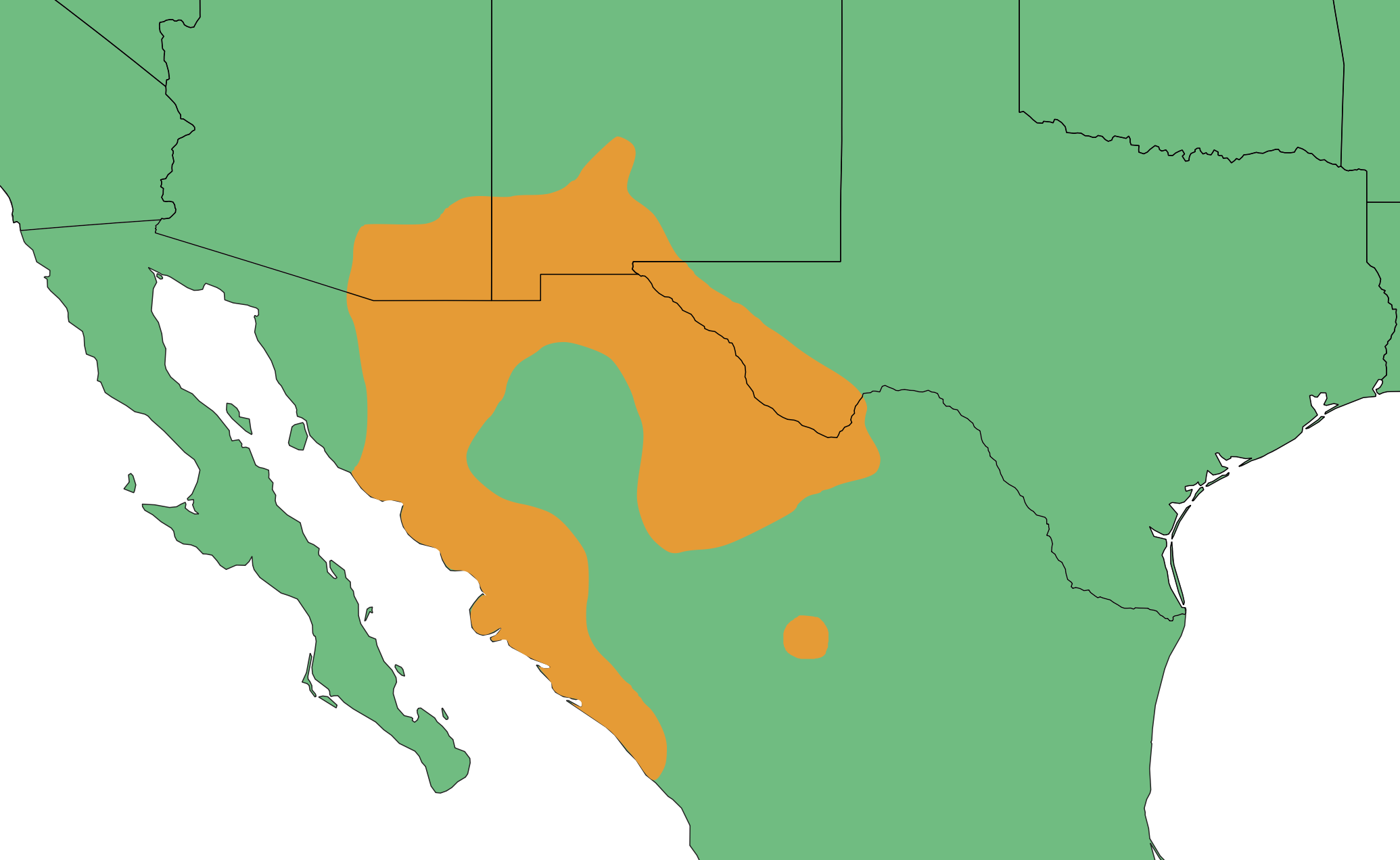

= Salvadora deserticola =

Species of snake

Salvadora deserticola, the Big Bend patchnose snake, is a species of snake of the family Colubridae.

The snake is found in the United States and Mexico.

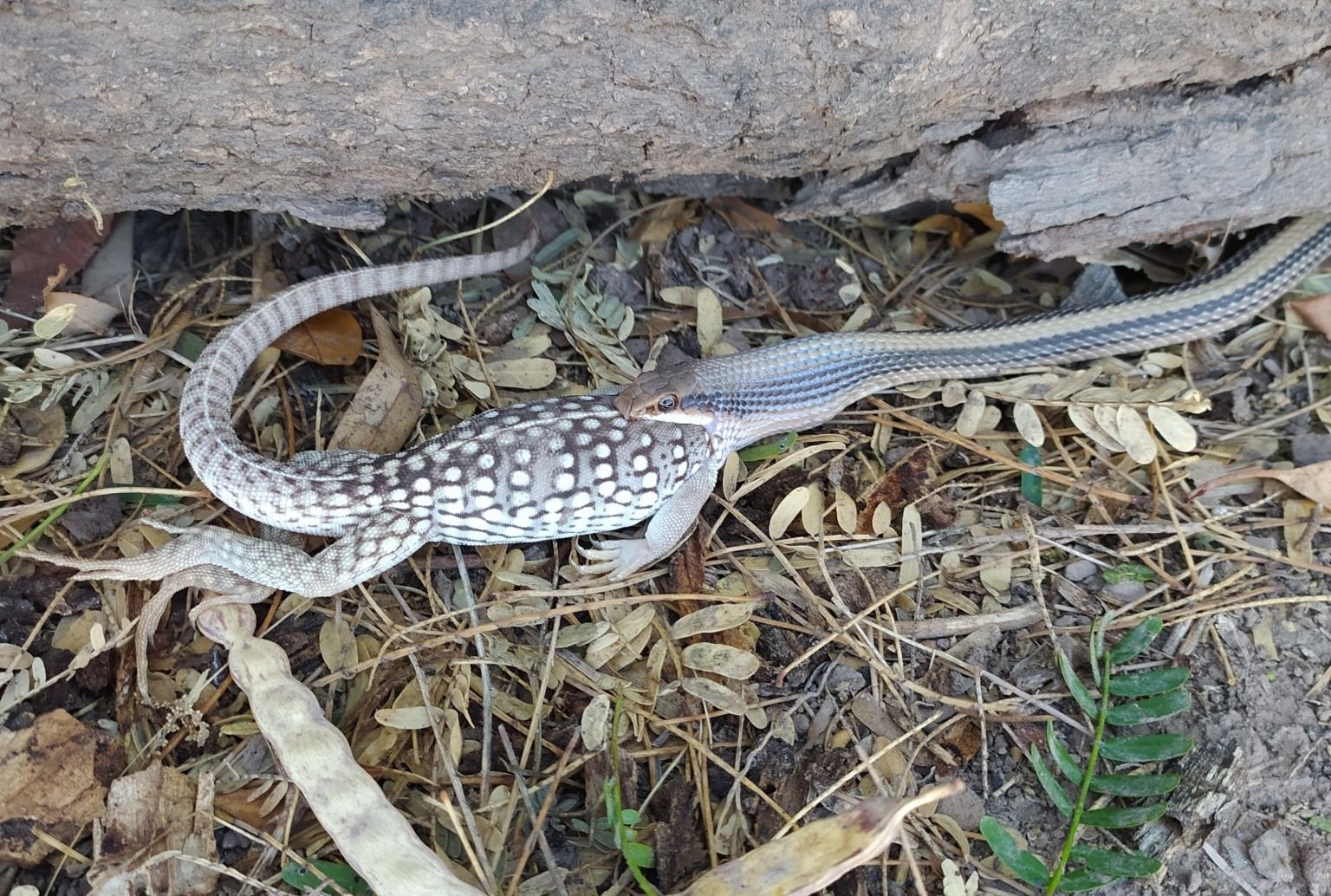
Eating a desert iguana.
