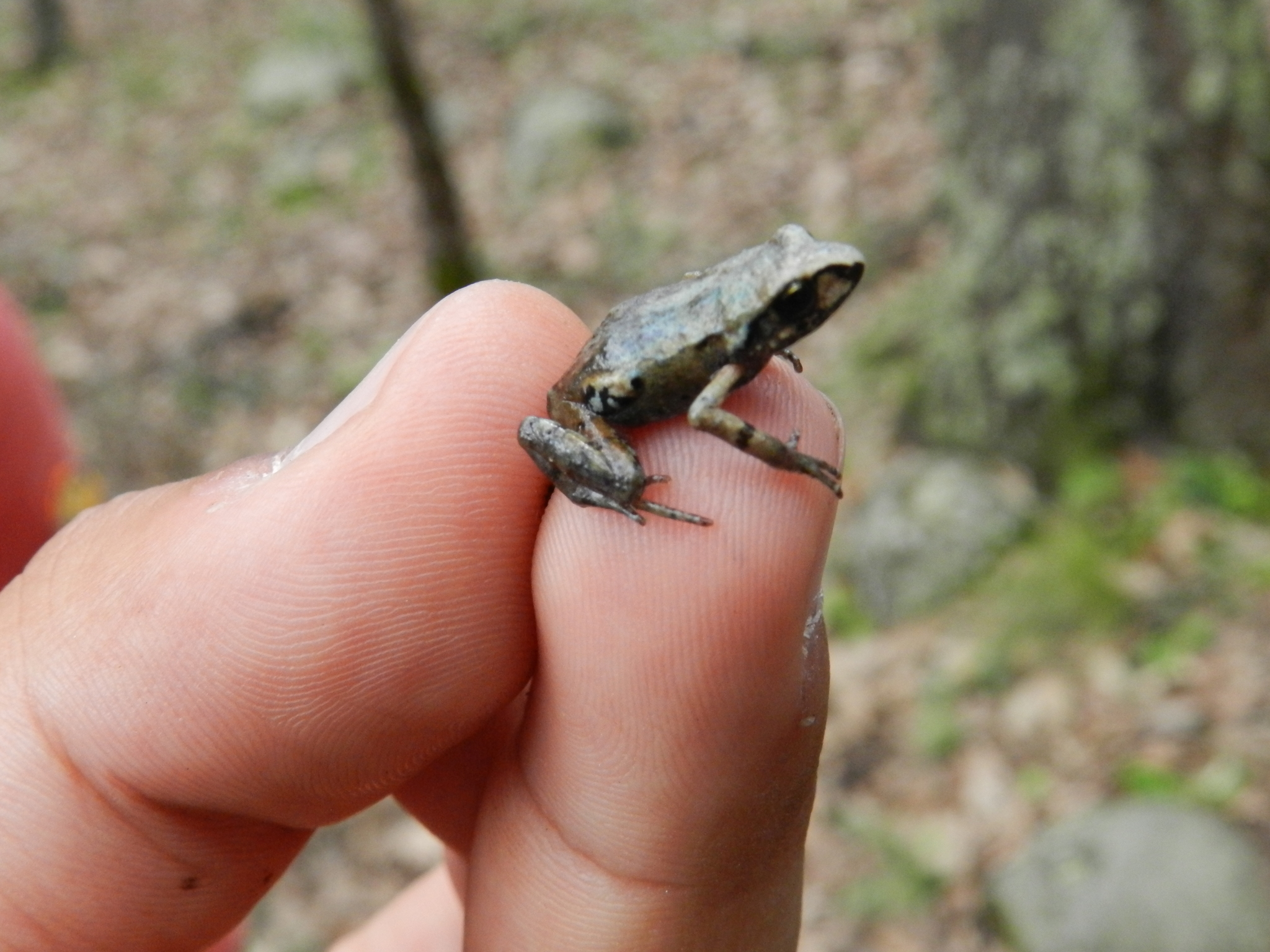

Conservation status
- Least Concern (IUCN 3.1)

Scientific classification
- Kingdom: Animalia
- Phylum: Chordata
- Class: Amphibia
- Order: Anura
- Family: Eleutherodactylidae
- Genus: Eleutherodactylus
- Subgenus: Syrrhophus
- Species: E. angustidigitorum

Binomial name
- Eleutherodactylus angustidigitorum (Taylor, 1940)

Synonyms
- Tomodactylus angustidigitorum Taylor, 1940 "1939"; Syrrhophus angustidigitorum (Taylor, 1940)

= Eleutherodactylus angustidigitorum =

Species of frog

Eleutherodactylus angustidigitorum is a species of frog in the family Eleutherodactylidae. It is endemic to Mexico and is known from Michoacán and southern Jalisco (Tuxpan). Common names Patzcuaro peeping frog and Patzcuaro stream frog have been coined for it.

== Description ==
Eleutherodactylus angustidigitorum are small frogs with a maximum size of about 25 mm (1.0 in) snout–vent length. The head is slightly narrower than the body and the snout is pointed. The canthus rostralis is distinct while the tympanum is small and indistinct. The digits have tapering tips; no webbing is present. Skin is smooth above apart from a few flattened and relatively indistinct pustules; the flanks and the venter are covered by large granules. Dorsal coloration is variable and may be nearly uniformly gray-black, reddish-brown with indistinct darker flecks and spots, deep brown, or brownish-gray with black spots.

== Habitat and conservation ==
Eleutherodactylus angustidigitorum occurs in pine-oak forests at elevations of about 1,500 m (4,900 ft) above sea level; the record from Jalisco is from 2,450 m (8,040 ft). It is a terrestrial frog typically found under stones and on the ground. Development is direct, that is, there is no free-living larval stage.

This species is threatened by habitat loss caused by logging and infrastructure development. It might occur in the Pico de Tancítaro National Park.
