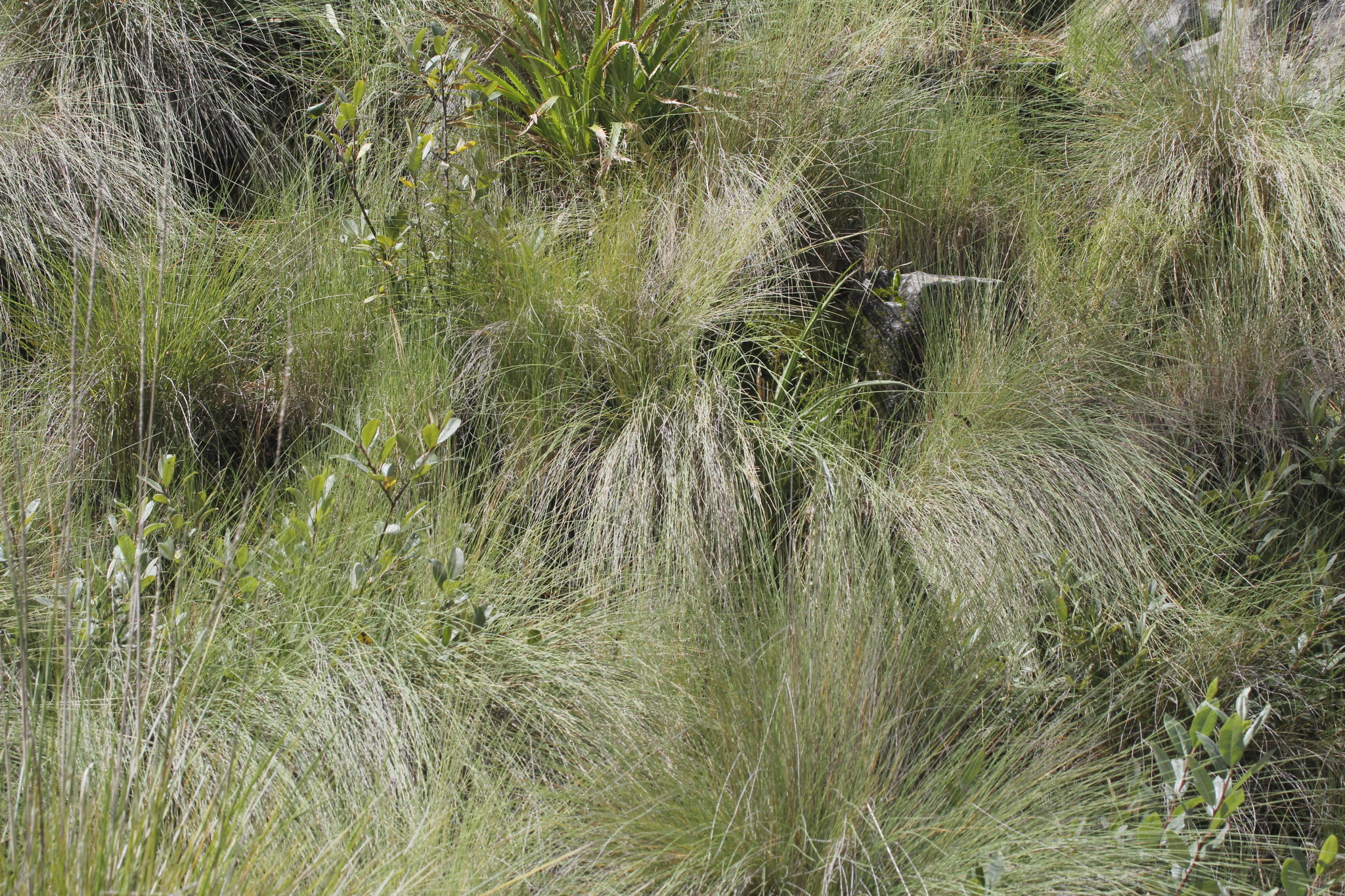
- Milpa Alta, Mexico City, Mexico

Scientific classification
- Kingdom: Plantae
- Clade: Tracheophytes
- Clade: Angiosperms
- Clade: Monocots
- Clade: Commelinids
- Order: Poales
- Family: Poaceae
- Subfamily: Chloridoideae
- Genus: Muhlenbergia
- Species: M. macroura

Binomial name
- Muhlenbergia macroura (Kunth) Hitchc.

Synonyms
- Crypsis macroura; Cinna setifolia; Crypsinna macroura; Crypsinna setifolia; Crypsis setifolia; Epicampes macroura; Phleum macrourum

= Muhlenbergia macroura =

Species of grass

Muhlenbergia macroura is a North American species of grass. It is a perennial grass that is endemic to Mexico and Guatemala. A common name of the grass is Mexican broomroot. The plant is cultivated and harvested for its roots, which may be woven into brooms or brushes. It is a major part of the diet of the volcano rabbit.
