= Tancítaro =

City and municipality in Mexico

Coordinates: 19°20′16″N 102°21′45″W

- Municipality
- Municipality of Tancítaro in Michoacán

- Location in Mexico Tancítaro (Mexico)
- Country: Mexico
- State: Michoacán

Population (2020)
  - Municipality: 33,453
- Demonym: (in Spanish)
- Time zone: UTC−6 (CST)

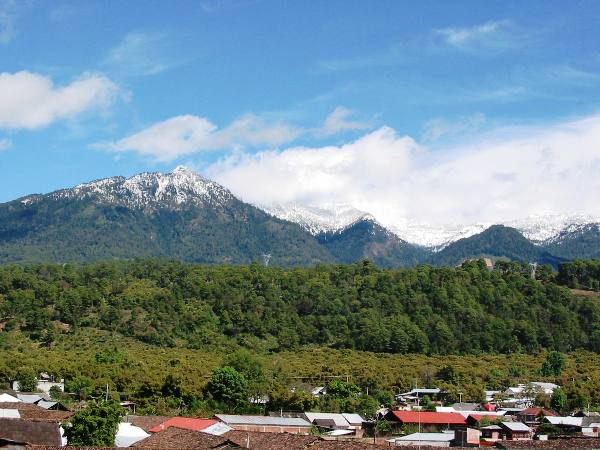
Pico de Tancítaro, the highest point in Michoacán state

Topography of the Municipality of Tancítaro

Tancítaro is a city and municipality in the western part of the Mexican state of Michoacán, in southwestern Mexico. Its municipal seat is the City of Tancítaro.

The area has been called "the avocado capital of the world." An Avocado Festival is held annually.

== Geography ==
The municipality has an area of 717.65 square kilometres (1.21% of the surface of the state).

It is bordered to the north by the municipalities of Peribán and Uruapan, to the east by Nuevo Parangaricutiro, to southeast by Parácuaro, to the south by Apatzingán, and to the southwest by Buenavista.

A volcanic peak, Pico de Tancítaro or Volcán Tancítaro, is located in the municipality. At 3,845 metres (12,615 ft) in elevation, it is the highest point in Michoacán state.

The municipality had a population of 26,089 inhabitants according to the 2005 census.

== Criminal activities ==
Due to an increase in criminal activity in the area, the 60 man Municipal Police Force was disbanded in December 2009. Soon after the people of Michoacán began taking up arms against the drug traffickers and against organized crime. They called themselves "auto defensas".

Mayor Gustavo Santoro and an aide were found dead September 27, 2010. It is believed they had been murdered by stoning.

The avocado growers association funded patrols by the Tancitaro Public Security Force (CUSEPT), and by summer of 2017, violence had subsided.

== World record for guacamole ==
The Junta Local de Sanidad Vegetal de Tancítaro set a world record for the largest serving of guacamole on 6 April 2018. It weighed 3,788 kg (8,351.11 lb).

== See also ==
- Avocado production in Mexico
