= Fernando Ferrari-Pérez =

Mexican academic (1857–1933)

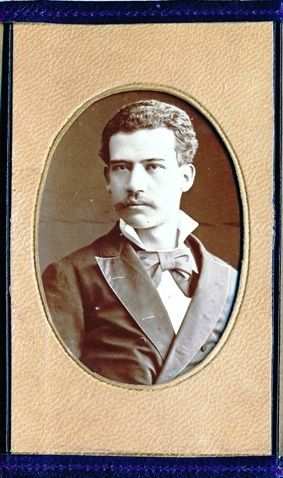
Ferrari-Pérez c. 1887

List of professional responsibilities and positions

Fernando Ferrari-Pérez (1857–1933) was a Mexican academic and biologist. Appointed head of the Mexican Geographical and Exploring Commission in the early 1880s, he was given a commission to catalogue the native mammals, birds, reptiles, fishes, and plants of Mexico. He was the author of the Catalogue of Animals collected by the Geographical and Exploring commission of the Republic of Mexico (1887). In addition to the above quotation's content, oral tradition holds that Ferrari-Pérez was carrying with him a belt with gold dust hidden in the lining; it was supposed to be used for various (state) payments during the exhibition. Ferrari-Pérez managed to save himself swimming up to shore and taking the belt with him and declaring its contents afterwards. The event was transmitted in time as an "act of honesty".

Outside of Mexico, Ferrari's work is known especially in the Natural Sciences milieu, and while it is true that his professional activities focused mainly around the sciences, he also dedicated an important part of his life to other activities.

His professional authoritativeness led the government of the time to ask his participation in international diplomacy, both in the promotion of economic relations in the Americas and in Mexico's particular interest to open economic and political links with Europe; thus he was awarded by the French Republic the medal of "Knight of the Legion of Honour" in 1901.

Besides this activity, his work included basic research in photography (he was also a chemist) as well as in the practice of photography. He earned many international prizes; as a verifiable example, reference is given (United States of America) to the Universal Exposition of Saint Louis - MDCCCCIV (1904) Motivation: Photographs in Glass Date: 1904 Grand Prize A "dossier" containing his research into different types of light (he also mentions the effect of "uranium" on sensible film) and different types of chemical substances. Researches dating to the last decades of the 19th century. A colour photograph is also present. Fernando Ferrari Pérez introduced cinema into Mexico by purchasing the rights for exploitation of the Frères Lumière patent for the country. The original contract document exists. Fernando Ferrari Pérez archives (documents and objects) are deposited in Italy, in the city of Mantova (Mantua, in English), in the city of birth of his father, Luigi Ferrari, who exiled himself in México because of a death sentence pending on him because of his participation in the fight of Italy for unification. The archives are in the custody of the Archivio di Stato della città di Mantova (the state archives of the city of Mantua).

A species of lizard, Sceloporus ferrariperezi, was named in his honor by Edward Drinker Cope in 1885. The species is considered a junior synonym of Sceloporus torquatus, which had been named by Arend Friedrich August Wiegmann in 1828.
