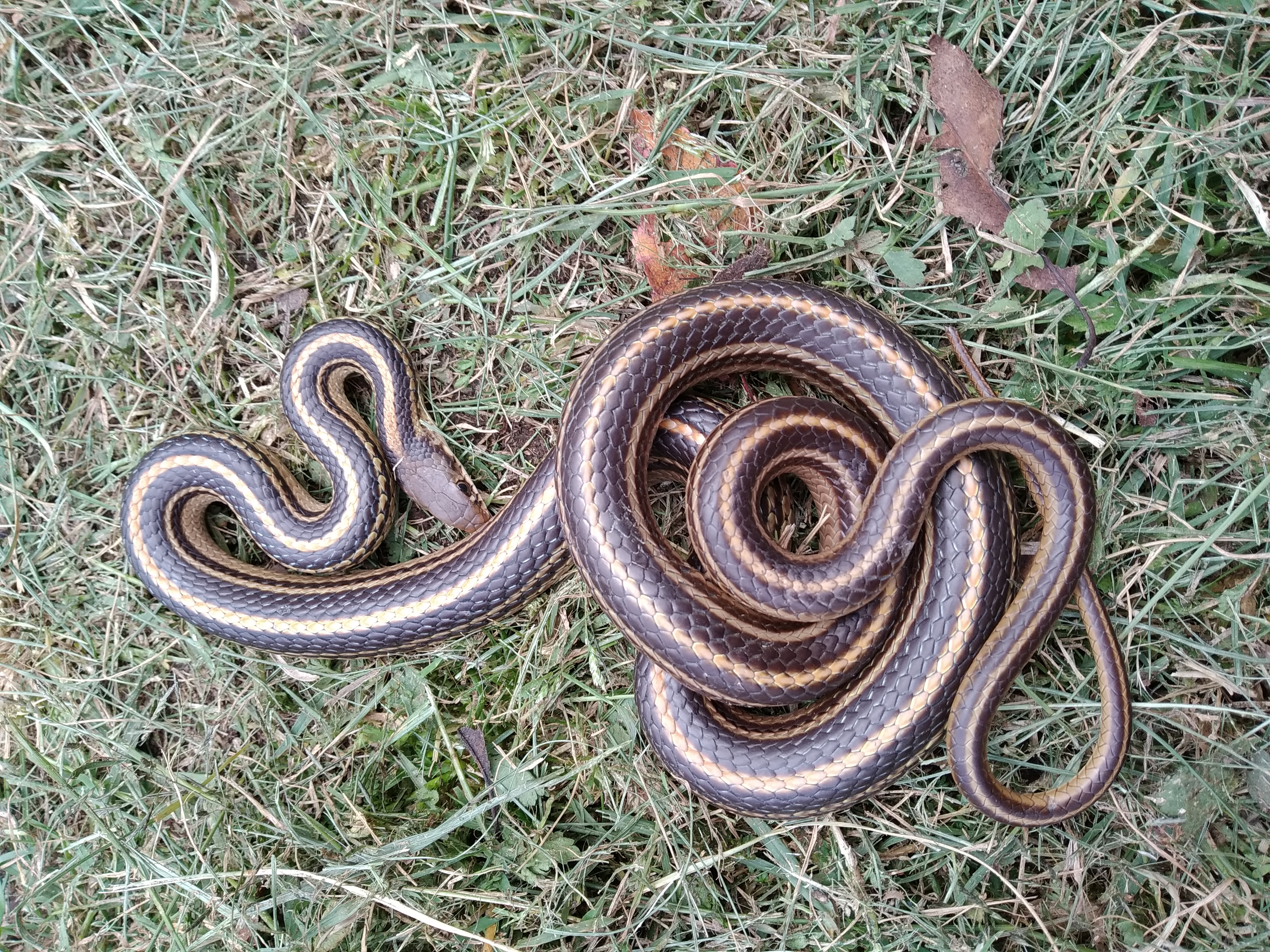

Conservation status
- Least Concern (IUCN 3.1)

Scientific classification
- Kingdom: Animalia
- Phylum: Chordata
- Class: Reptilia
- Order: Squamata
- Suborder: Serpentes
- Family: Colubridae
- Genus: Salvadora
- Species: S. bairdi

Binomial name
- Salvadora bairdi Jan, 1860

Synonyms
- Salvadora bairdi Jan, 1860; Salvadora bogerti H.M. Smith, 1941; Salvadora bairdi — W.B. Davis & H.M. Smith, 1953; Salvadora grahamiae bairdi — W. Tanner, 1985; Salvadora bairdi — Liner, 1994

= Salvadora bairdi =

Species of snake

Salvadora bairdi, also known commonly as Baird's patchnose snake and la culebra chata de Baird in Mexican Spanish, is a species of snake in the subfamily Colubrinae of the family Colubridae. The species is native to central Mexico.

== Etymology ==
The specific name, bairdi, is in honor of American zoologist Spencer Fullerton Baird.

== Geographic range ==
S. bairdi is found in the Mexican states of Aguascalientes, southern Chihuahua, Colima, Durango, Guanajuato, Guerrero, Hidalgo, Jalisco, Michoacán, Morelos, Nayarit, Oaxaca, Puebla, Querétaro, Sinaloa, Sonora, and Veracruz.

== Habitat ==
The preferred natural habitats of S. bairdi are forest and shrubland, at altitudes of 1,200–2,400 m (3,900–7,900 ft), but it has also been found in agricultural areas.

== Description ==
In S. bairdi the rostral does not have free edges. The pale vertebral stripe is three dorsal scales wide on the neck, and tapers to one dorsal scale wide on the posterior third of the body.

== Behavior ==
S. bairdi is terrestrial.

== Diet ==
S. bairdi preys upon amphibians, small lizards, and small mammals.

== Reproduction ==
S. bairdi is oviparous. An adult female may lay one or two clutches per season.
