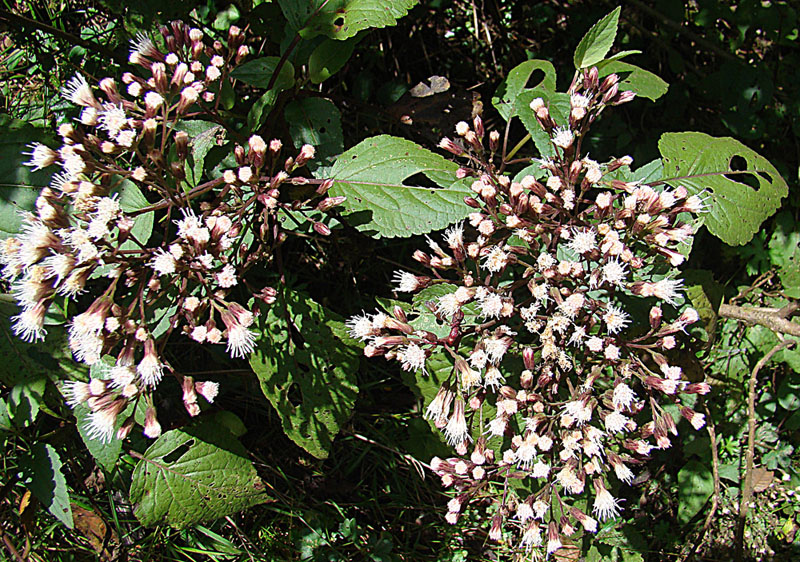
- Archibaccharis schiedeana

Scientific classification
- Kingdom: Plantae
- Clade: Embryophytes
- Clade: Tracheophytes
- Clade: Angiosperms
- Clade: Eudicots
- Clade: Asterids
- Order: Asterales
- Family: Asteraceae
- Subfamily: Asteroideae
- Tribe: Astereae
- Subtribe: Baccharidinae
- Genus: Archibaccharis; Heering

Synonyms
- Hemibaccharis S.F.Blake

= Archibaccharis =

Genus of flowering plants

Archibaccharis is a genus of flowering plants in the family Asteraceae.

Species

Archibaccharis is native to Mexico and Central America.

- Archibaccharis albescens (J.D.Jacks.) G.L.Nesom
- Archibaccharis almedana G.L.Nesom
- Archibaccharis androgyna (Brandegee) S.F.Blake
- Archibaccharis asperifolia (Benth.) S.F.Blake
- Archibaccharis auriculata (Hemsl.) G.L.Nesom
- Archibaccharis blakeana Standl. & Steyerm.
- Archibaccharis breedlovei G.L.Nesom & B.L.Turner
- Archibaccharis caloneura S.F.Blake
- Archibaccharis campii S.F.Blake
- Archibaccharis corymbosa (Donn.Sm.) S.F.Blake
- Archibaccharis flexilis (S.F.Blake) S.F.Blake
- Archibaccharis glakeana Standl. & Steyerm.
- Archibaccharis hieracioides (S.F.Blake) S.F.Blake
- Archibaccharis hirtella (DC.) Heering Accepted
- Archibaccharis intermedia (S.F.Blake) B.L.Turner
- Archibaccharis jacksonii S.D.Sundb.
- Archibaccharis lineariloba J.D.Jacks.
- Archibaccharis lucentifolia L.O.Williams
- Archibaccharis macdonaldii G.L.Nesom
- Archibaccharis nephocephala G.L.Nesom
- Archibaccharis nicaraguensis G.L.Nesom
- Archibaccharis peninsularis S.F.Blake
- Archibaccharis pringlei (Greenm.) S.F.Blake
- Archibaccharis salmeoides (S.F.Blake) S.F.Blake
- Archibaccharis schiedeana (Benth.) J.D.Jacks.
- Archibaccharis serratifolia (Kunth) S.F.Blake
- Archibaccharis simplex (S.F.Blake) S.F.Blake
- Archibaccharis standleyi S.F.Blake
- Archibaccharis subsessilis S.F.Blake
- Archibaccharis taeniotricha (S.F.Blake) G.L.Nesom
- Archibaccharis trichotoma (Klatt) G.L.Nesom
- Archibaccharis tuxtlensis G.L.Nesom
- Archibaccharis venturana G.L.Nesom
- Archibaccharis veracruzana G.L.Nesom
- Archibaccharis vesticaulis G.L.Nesom
