= Festuca amplissima =

Scientific classification
- Kingdom: Plantae
- Clade: Tracheophytes
- Clade: Angiosperms
- Clade: Monocots
- Clade: Commelinids
- Order: Poales
- Family: Poaceae
- Subfamily: Pooideae
- Genus: Festuca
- Species: F. amplissima

Binomial name
- Festuca amplissima Rupr.

Synonyms
- Festuca fratercula

Species of grass

Festuca amplissima is a species of grass that are rhizomatous perennials. This species is endemic to Panama, Venezuela and Ecuador. Festuca amplissima has three subspecies, and one variety. It was first described in 1842.

- Festuca amplissima subsp. amplissima
  - Festuca amplissima var. elliptica
- Festuca amplissima subsp. sierra
- Festuca amplissima subsp. magdalenaensis

== Characteristics ==
Festuca amplissima has loosely tufted flowers. It has brown glabrous leaves that are membranous and has culms that are erect, scabrous and grow from 100 to 120 centimetres tall. The ligules of this species grow from 0.5 - 0.7 millimetres long and the panicles are 20-25 centimetres long, 2-5 centimetres wide.
