= Michoacán–Guanajuato volcanic field =

Volcanic field in the Michoacán and Guanajuato states of central Mexico

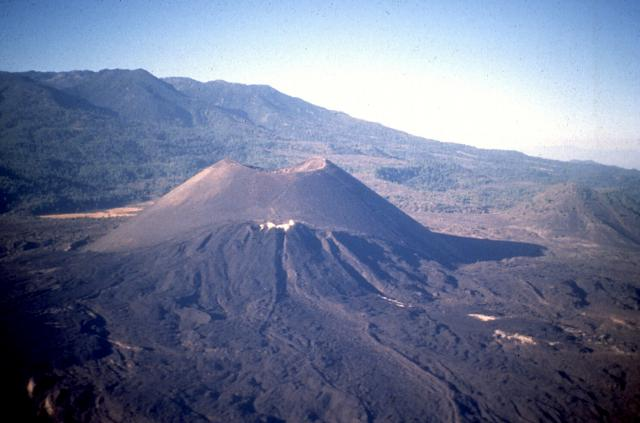
- Parícutin cinder cone and the Cerro de Tancítaro shield volcano

Highest point
- Elevation: 3,860 m (12,660 ft)

Geography
- Location within Mexico
- Location: Michoacán and Guanajuato, Mexico

Geology
- Mountain type: Cinder cones
- Last eruption: 1943 to 1952 (Parícutin)

The Michoacán–Guanajuato volcanic field is located in the Michoacán and Guanajuato states of central Mexico. It is a volcanic field that takes the form of a large cinder cone field, with numerous shield volcanoes and maars. Pico de Tancítaro (3860 m) is the highest peak.

The volcanic field is best known for the 18th-century eruption of Jorullo volcano, and 20th-century eruption of Parícutin volcano.

== Morphology ==
The Michoacán–Guanajuato volcanic field covers an area of 200 by 250 kilometres (120 mi × 160 mi), in the states of Michoacán and Guanajuato. It contains 1400 vents, mostly cinder cones. The shield volcanoes are mostly Pleistocene in age. The field includes Siete Luminarias, a group of seven maars in and around Valle de Santiago in Guanajuato. Other volcanoes in the field include Alberca de los Espinos in Michoacán and Cerro Culiacán in Guanajuato.

The cinder cones are randomly arranged and occur at low altitudes, usually, on alluvial plains or on the flanks of eroded shield volcanoes. There are an average of 2.5 cinder cones every 100 kilometres (62 mi)^{2}.

== Eruptions ==
=== El Jorullo — 1759−1774 ===
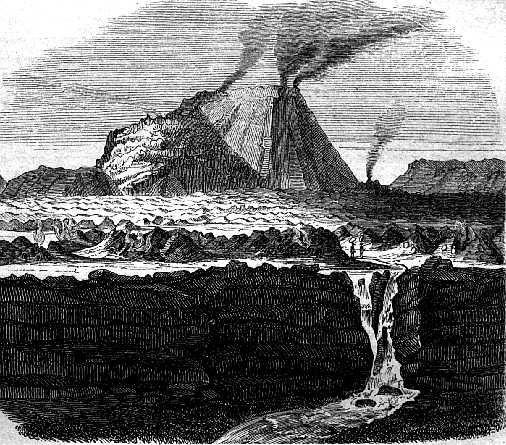
Drawing of El Jorullo

El Jorullo volcano began on September 29, 1759. Earthquakes occurred prior to this first day of the eruption. Once the cinder cone started erupting, it continued for 15 years, eventually stopping in 1774. El Jorullo destroyed what had been a rich agricultural area. It grew approximately 820 feet (250 meters) from the ground in the first six weeks. The eruptions from El Jorullo were primarily phreatic and phreatomagmatic. They covered the area with sticky mudflows, water flows, and ash falls. All but the youngest lava flows were covered by this ashfall.

Later eruptions from El Jorullo were magmatic with neither mud nor water flows. This 15-year eruption was the longest one El Jorullo has had and was the longest cinder cone eruption known. Lava flows can still be seen to the north and west of the cinder cone. The eruption had a VEI of 4.

Its current elevation is 1,320 meters (4,330 feet), and its crater is about 1,300 by 1,640 feet (400 by 500 meters) wide and 490 feet (150 meters) deep.

El Jorullo has four smaller cinder cones which have grown from its flanks. The vents of El Jorullo are aligned in a northeast to southwest direction. Lava from these vents cover nine km^{2} around the volcano. Later eruptions produced lavas that had higher silica contents making them more viscous than the earlier basalts and basaltic andesite lavas.

=== El Parícutin — 1943−1952 ===
The Parícutin volcano began as a fissure in a cornfield owned by a Purépecha farmer, Dionisio Pulido, on February 20, 1943. Pulido, his wife, and their son all witnessed the initial eruption of ash and stones first-hand as they ploughed the field. El Parícutin grew quickly, reaching five stories tall in just a week, and it could be seen from afar in a month. Much of the volcano's growth occurred during its first year, while it was still in the explosive pyroclastic phase. The nearby villages of Paricutín (after which the volcano was named) and San Juan Parangaricutiro were both buried in lava and ash. The residents relocated to nearby lands.

At the end of the first phase, after roughly one year, the cinder cone had grown 336 m (1,102 ft) tall. For the next eight years El Parícutin would continue erupting, although this was dominated by relatively quiet eruptions of lava that would scorch the surrounding 25 km^{2} (9.7 mi^{2}) of land. The cinder cone's activity would slowly decline during this period until the last six months of the eruption, during which violent and explosive activity was frequent.

In 1952 the eruption ended and Parícutin went quiet, attaining a final height of 424 m (1,391 ft) from the cornfield where it began. Like most cinder cones, Parícutin is believed to be a monogenetic volcano, which means that once it has finished erupting, it will never erupt again. Any new eruptions in the Michoacan-Guanajuato volcanic field will erupt in a new location.

Three people died as a result of lightning strikes caused by the eruptions, but no deaths were attributed to the lava or asphyxiation.

== Gallery ==
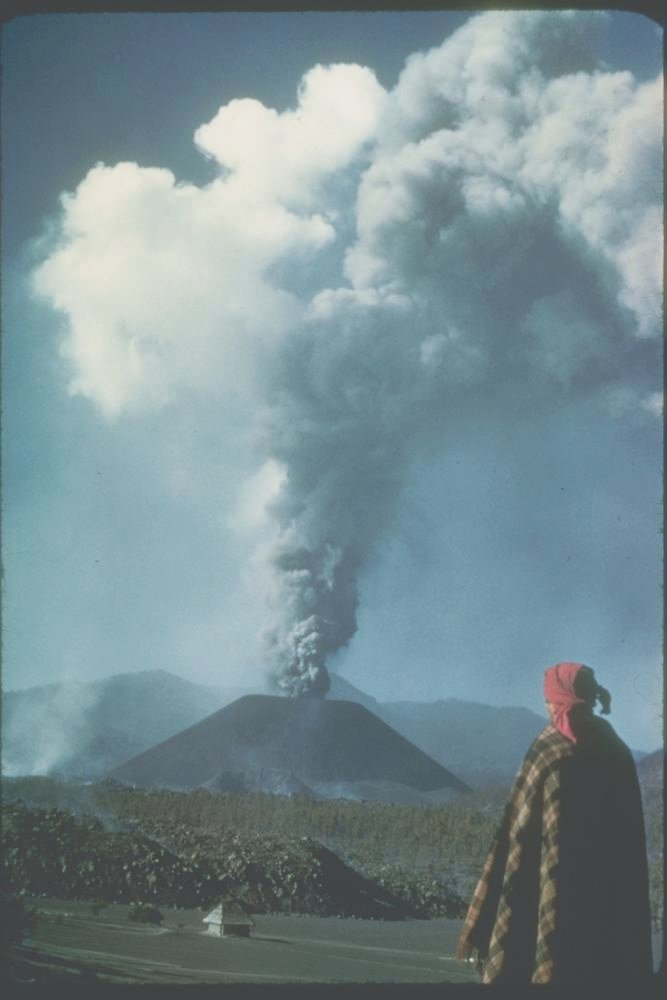
Cinder cone in 1943

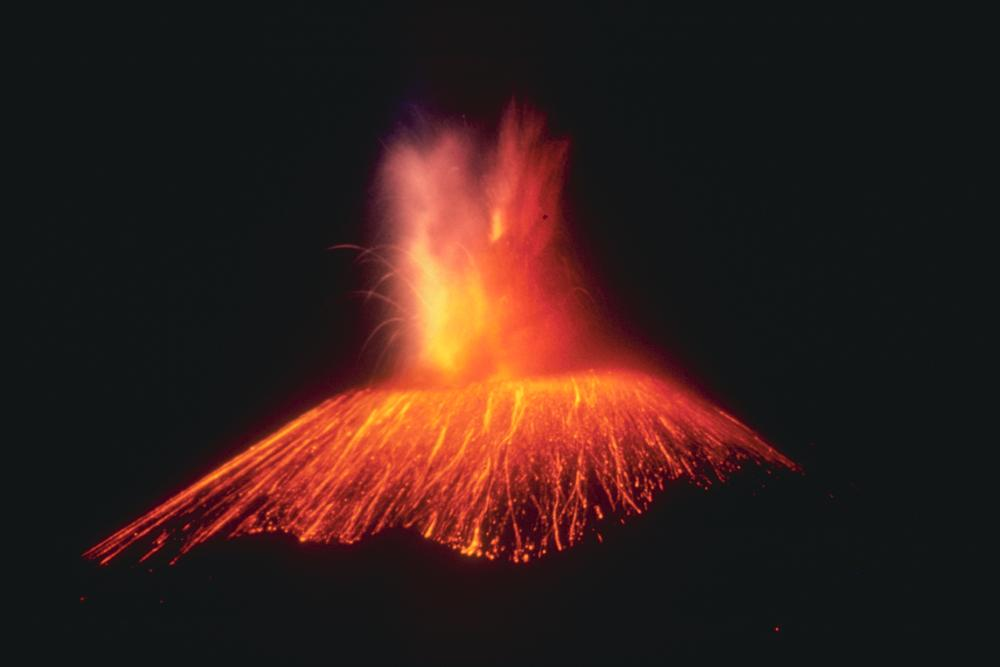
1943 eruption

Parícutin from Las Cabañas

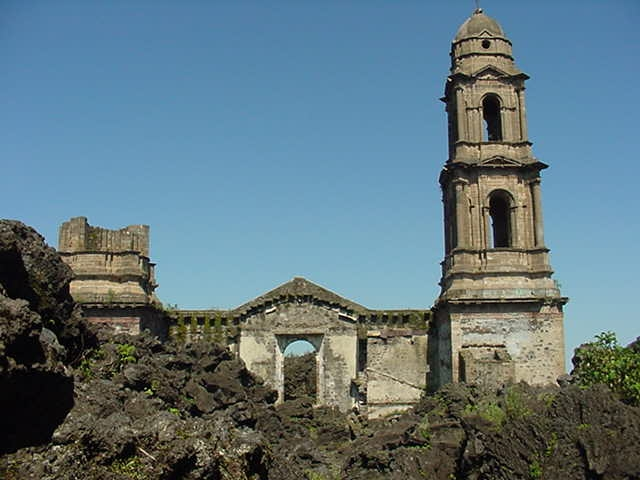
San Juan Parangaricutiro Church

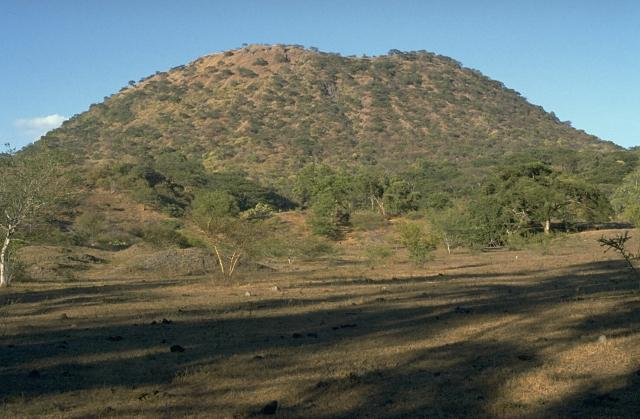
Jorullo Cinder Cone

== See also ==
- List of volcanic fields
