= Ulysses Fossae =

Fossae on Mars

- Southern part of Ulysses Fossae
- Coordinates: 10.06°N 123.07°W

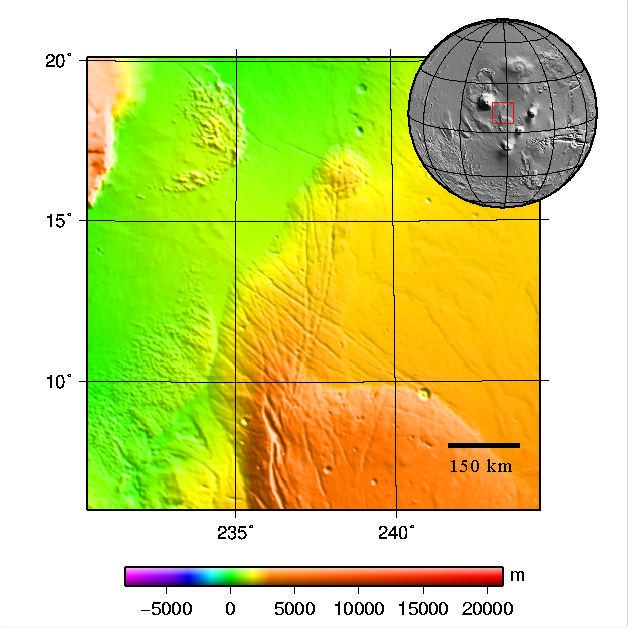
Topographic map of northern part of Ulysses Fossae

The Ulysses Fossae are a group of troughs in the Tharsis quadrangle of Mars at 10.06° north latitude and 123.07° west longitude. They were named after an albedo feature name. The area contains pitted cones called Ulysses Colles which were interpreted to be possible Martian equivalents to terrestrial cinder cones.

Map of Tharsis quadrangle with major features indicated. Tharsis contains many volcanoes, including Olympus Mons, the tallest known volcano in the Solar System. Notice Ceraunius Tholus, although it looks small, it is about as high as Earth's Mount Everest.

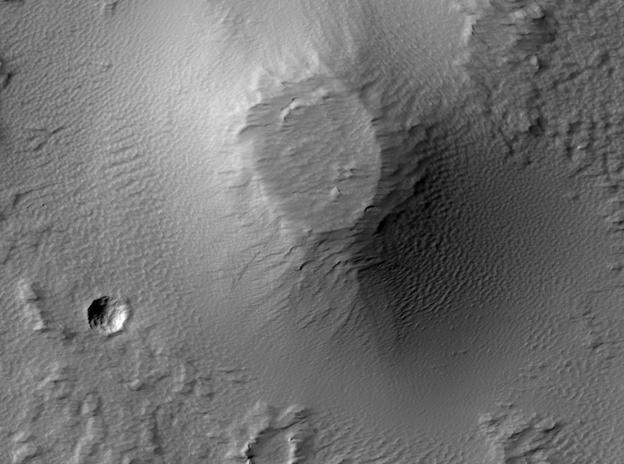
Probable cinder cone in Ulysses Colles, as seen by HiRISE.

== See also ==
- Fossa (geology)
- Geology of Mars
