= Volcanic cone =

Landform of ejecta from a volcanic vent piled up in a conical shape

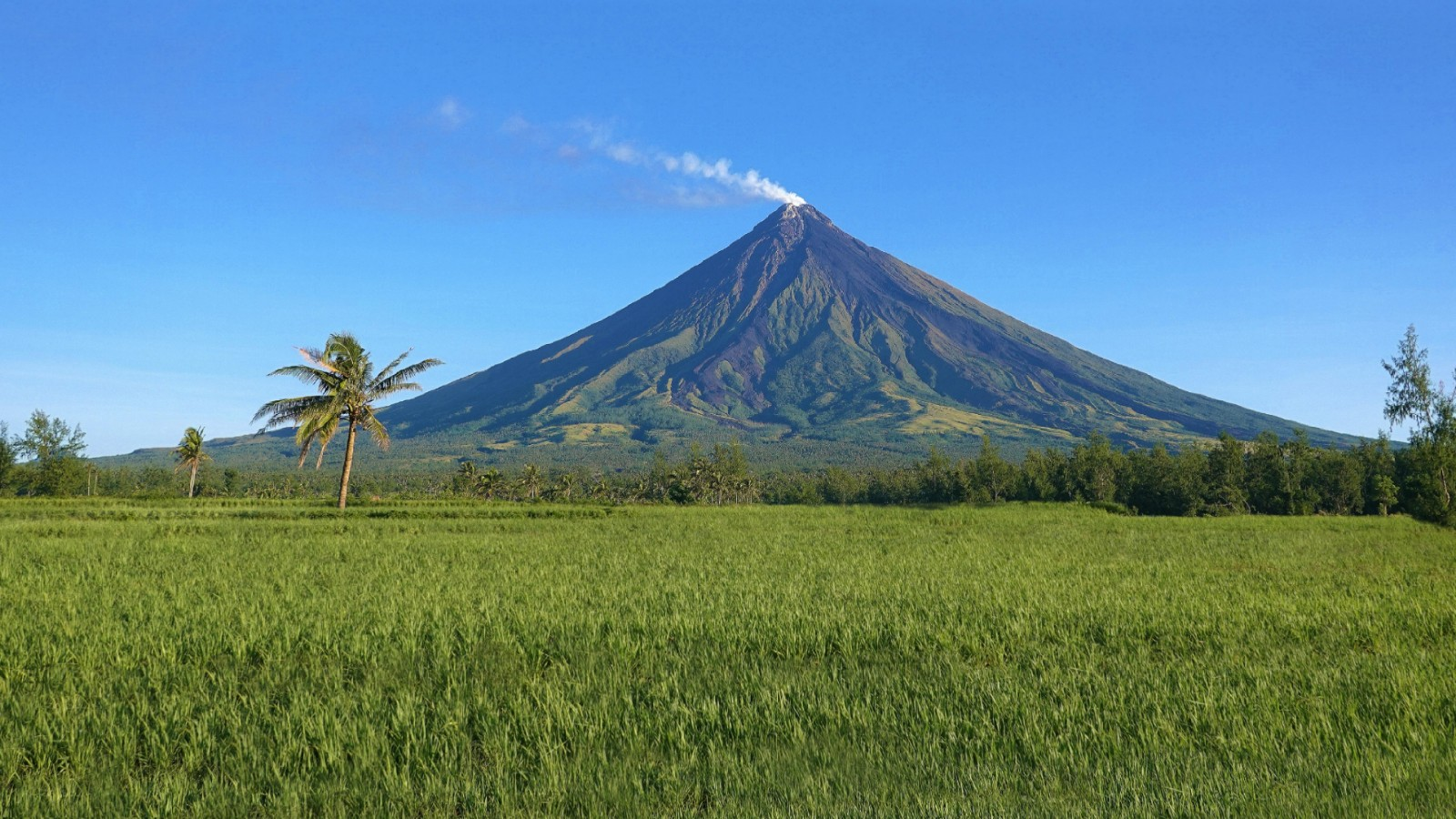
Mayon in the Philippines has a symmetrical volcanic cone.

Volcanic cones are among the simplest volcanic landforms. They are built by ejecta from a volcanic vent, piling up around the vent in the shape of a cone with a central crater. Volcanic cones are of different types, depending upon the nature and size of the fragments ejected during the eruption. Types of volcanic cones include stratocones, spatter cones, tuff cones, and cinder cones.

== Stratocone ==
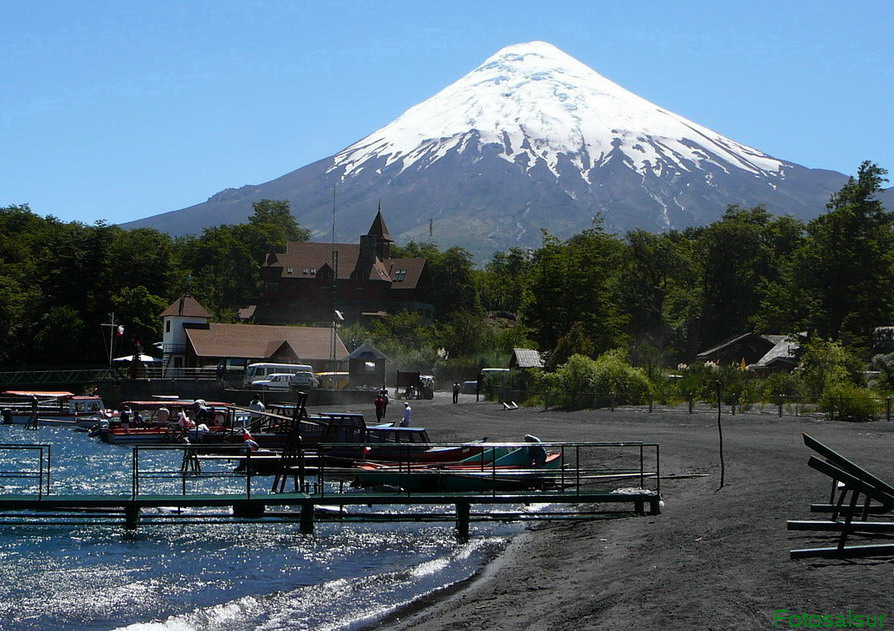
Osorno volcano in Chile is an example of a well-developed stratocone.

Stratocones are large cone-shaped volcanoes made up of lava flows, explosively erupted pyroclastic rocks, and igneous intrusives that are typically centered around a cylindrical vent. Unlike shield volcanoes, they are characterized by a steep profile and periodic, often alternating, explosive eruptions and effusive eruptions. Some have collapsed craters called calderas. The central core of a stratocone is commonly dominated by a central core of intrusive rocks that range from around 500 meters (1,600 ft) to over several kilometers in diameter. This central core is surrounded by multiple generations of lava flows, many of which are brecciated, and a wide range of pyroclastic rocks and reworked volcanic debris. The typical stratocone is an andesitic to dacitic volcano that is associated with subduction zones. They are also known as either stratified volcano, composite cone, bedded volcano, cone of mixed type or Vesuvian-type volcano.

== Spatter cone ==
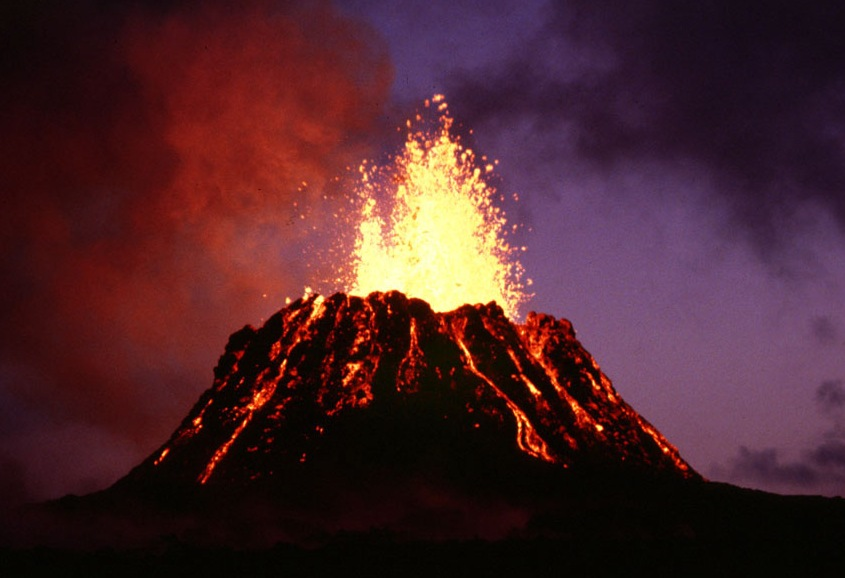
Puʻu ʻŌʻō, a cinder-and-spatter cone on Kīlauea, Hawaiʻi

A spatter cone is a low, steep-sided hill or mound that consists of welded lava fragments, called spatter, which has formed around a lava fountain issuing from a central vent. Typically, spatter cones are about 3–5 meters (9.8–16.4 ft) high. In case of a linear fissure, lava fountaining will create broad embankments of spatter, called spatter ramparts, along both sides of the fissure. Spatter cones are more circular and cone shaped, while spatter ramparts are linear wall-like features.

Spatter cones and spatter ramparts are typically formed by lava fountaining associated with mafic, highly fluid lavas, such as those erupted in the Hawaiian Islands. As blobs of molten lava, spatter, are erupted into the air by a lava fountain, they can lack the time needed to cool completely before hitting the ground. Consequently, the spatter are not fully solid, like taffy, as they land and they bind to the underlying spatter as both often slowly ooze down the side of the cone. As a result, the spatter builds up a cone that is composed of spatter either agglutinated or welded to each other.

== Tuff cones ==
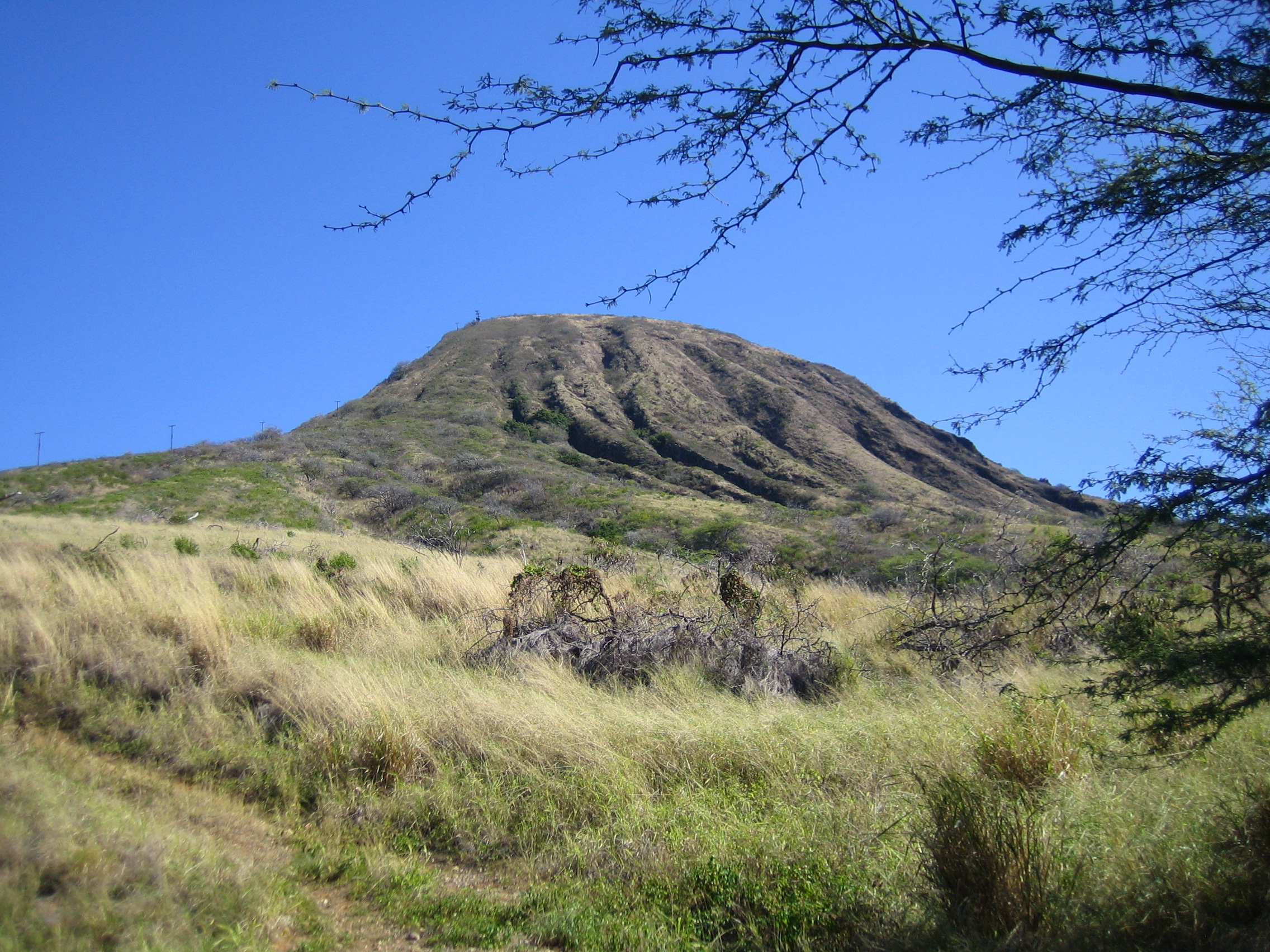
Koko Crater is a tuff cone that is part of the Honolulu Volcanic Series.

A tuff cone, sometimes called an ash cone, is a small monogenetic volcanic cone produced by phreatic (hydrovolcanic) explosions directly associated with magma brought to the surface through a conduit from a deep-seated magma reservoir. They are characterized by high rims that have a maximum relief of 100–800 meters (330–2,620 ft) above the crater floor and steep slopes that are greater than 25 degrees. They typically have a rim to rim diameter of 300–5,000 meters (980–16,400 ft). A tuff cone consists typically of thick-bedded pyroclastic flow and surge deposits created by eruption-fed density currents and bomb-scoria beds derived from fallout from its eruption column. The tuffs composing a tuff cone have commonly been altered, palagonitized, by either its interaction with groundwater or when it was deposited warm and wet. The pyroclastic deposits of tuff cones differ from the pyroclastic deposits of spatter cones by their lack or paucity of lava spatter, smaller grain-size, and excellent bedding. Typically, but not always, tuff cones lack associated lava flows.

A tuff ring is a related type of small monogenetic volcano that is also produced by phreatic (hydrovolcanic) explosions directly associated with magma brought to the surface through a conduit from a deep-seated magma reservoir. They are characterized by rims that have a low, broad topographic profiles and gentle topographic slopes that are 25 degrees or less. The maximum thickness of the pyroclastic debris comprising the rim of a typical tuff ring is generally thin, less than 50 meters (160 ft) to 100 meters (330 ft) thick. The pyroclastic materials that comprise their rim consist primarily of relatively fresh and unaltered, distinctly and thin-bedded volcanic surge and air fall deposits. Their rims also can contain variable amounts of local country rock (bedrock) blasted out of their crater. In contrast to tuff cones, the crater of a tuff ring generally has been excavated below the existing ground surface. As a result, water commonly fills a tuff ring's crater to form a lake once eruptions cease.

Both tuff cones and their associated tuff rings were created by explosive eruptions from a vent where the magma is interacting with either groundwater or a shallow body of water as found within a lake or sea. The interaction between the magma, expanding steam, and volcanic gases resulted in the production and ejection of fine-grained pyroclastic debris called ash with the consistency of flour. The volcanic ash comprising a tuff cone accumulated either as fallout from eruption columns, from low-density volcanic surges and pyroclastic flows, or combination of these. Tuff cones are typically associated with volcanic eruptions within shallow bodies of water and tuff rings are associated with eruptions within either water saturated sediments and bedrock or permafrost.

Next to spatter (scoria) cones, tuff cones and their associated tuff rings are among the most common types of volcanoes on Earth. An example of a tuff cone is Diamond Head at Waikīkī in Hawaiʻi. Clusters of pitted cones observed in the Nephentes/Amenthes region of Mars at the southern margin of the ancient Utopia impact basin are currently interpreted as being tuff cones and rings.

== Cinder cone ==
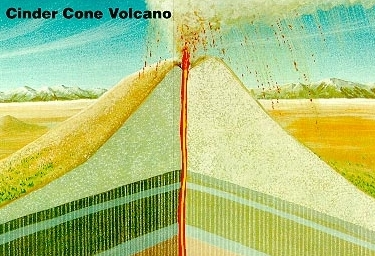
Cinder cone

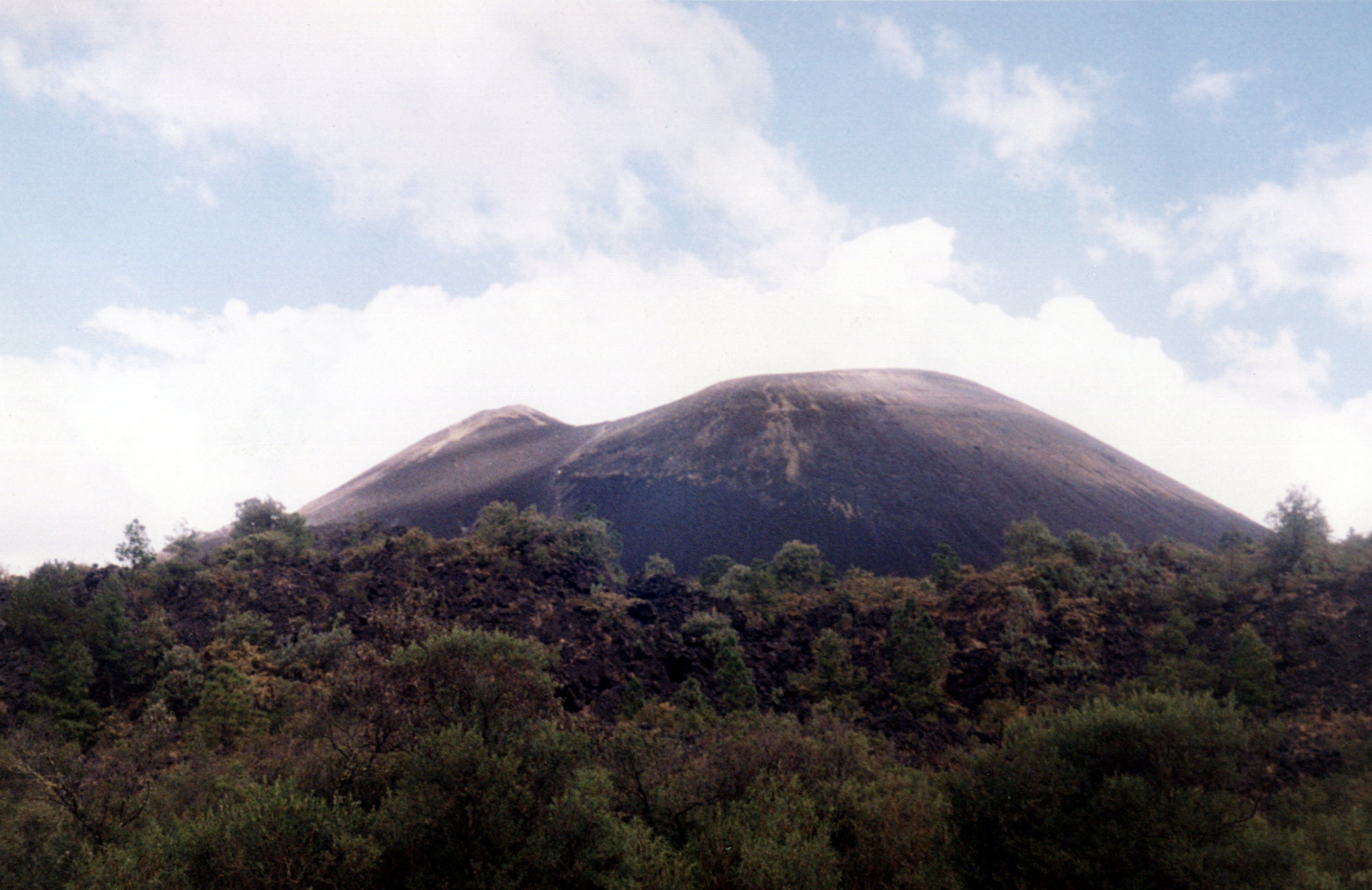
Parícutin is a large cinder cone in Mexico.

Cinder cones, also known as scoria cones and less commonly scoria mounds, are small, steep-sided volcanic cones built of loose pyroclastic fragments, such as either volcanic clinkers, cinders, volcanic ash, or scoria. They consist of loose pyroclastic debris formed by explosive eruptions or lava fountains from a single, typically cylindrical, vent. As the gas-charged lava is blown violently into the air, it breaks into small fragments that solidify and fall as either cinders, clinkers, or scoria around the vent to form a cone that often is noticeably symmetrical; with slopes between 30 and 40°; and a nearly circular ground plan. Most cinder cones have a bowl-shaped crater at the summit. The basal diameters of cinder cones average about 800 meters (2,600 ft) and range from 250 to 2,500 meters (820 to 8,200 ft). The diameter of their craters ranges between 50 and 600 meters (160 and 1,970 ft). Cinder cones rarely rise more than 50–350 meters (160–1,150 ft) or so above their surroundings.

Cinder cones most commonly occur as isolated cones in large basaltic volcanic fields. They also occur in nested clusters in association with complex tuff ring and maar complexes. Finally, they are also common as parasitic and monogenetic cones on complex shield and stratovolcanoes. Globally, cinder cones are the most typical volcanic landform found within continental intraplate volcanic fields and also occur in some subduction zone settings as well. Parícutin, the Mexican cinder cone which was born in a cornfield on February 20, 1943, and Sunset Crater in Northern Arizona in the US Southwest are classic examples of cinder cones, as are ancient volcanic cones found in New Mexico's Petroglyph National Monument. Cone-shaped hills observed in satellite imagery of the calderas and volcanic cones of Ulysses Patera, Ulysses Colles and Hydraotes Chaos are argued to be cinder cones.

Cinder cones typically only erupt once like Parícutin. As a result, they are considered to be monogenetic volcanoes and most of them form monogenetic volcanic fields. Cinder cones are typically active for very brief periods of time before becoming inactive. Their eruptions range in duration from a few days to a few years. Of observed cinder cone eruptions, 50% have lasted for less than 30 days, and 95% stopped within one year. In case of Parícutin, its eruption lasted for nine years from 1943 to 1952. Rarely do they erupt either two, three, or more times. Later eruptions typically produce new cones within a volcanic field at separation distances of a few kilometers and separate by periods of 100 to 1,000 years. Within a volcanic field, eruptions can occur over a period of a million years. Once eruptions cease, being unconsolidated, cinder cones tend to erode rapidly unless further eruptions occur.

== Rootless cones ==
Rootless cones, also called pseudocraters, are volcanic cones that are not directly associated with a conduit that brought magma to the surface from a deep-seated magma reservoir. Generally, three types of rootless cones, littoral cones, explosion craters, and hornitos are recognized. Littoral cones and explosion craters are the result of mild explosions that were generated locally by the interaction of either hot lava or pyroclastic flows with water. Littoral cones typically form on the surface of a basaltic lava flow where it has entered into a body of water, usually a sea or ocean. Explosion craters form where either hot lava or pyroclastic flows have covered either marshy ground or water-saturated ground of some sort. Hornitos are rootless cones that are composed of welded lava fragments and were formed on the surface of basaltic lava flows by the escape of gas and clots of molten lava through cracks or other openings in the crust of a lava flow.
