= El Jorullo =

Mountain in Mexico

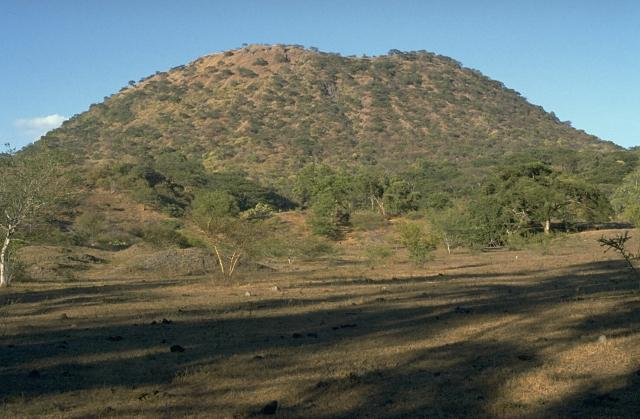
- El Jorullo cinder cone

Highest point
- Elevation: 1,330 m (4,360 ft)
- Coordinates: 18°58′24″N 101°42′57″W

Geography
- Location: La Huacana, Michoacán, Mexico

Geology
- Mountain type: cinder cone
- Last eruption: 1759–1774

Climbing
- Easiest route: Hike

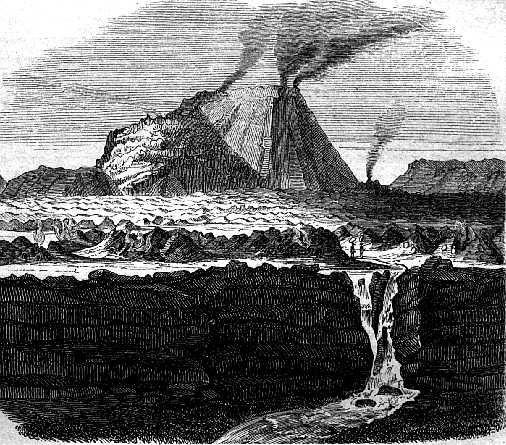
Drawing of El Jorullo

El Jorullo is a cinder cone volcano in Michoacán, central Mexico, on the southwest slope of the central plateau, 33 miles (53 kilometers) southeast of Uruapan in an area known as the Michoacán-Guanajuato volcanic field. It is about 6 miles (9.7 km) east-northeast of La Huacana. Its current elevation is 4,360 ft (1,329 m). El Jorullo has four smaller cinder cones which have grown from its flanks. The vents of El Jorullo are aligned in a northeast to southwest direction. Lava from these vents cover nine square km around the volcano. Later eruptions produced lavas that had higher silica contents making them thicker than the earlier basalts and basaltic andesite lavas. El Jorullo's crater is about 1,300 by 1,640 feet (400 by 500 m) wide and 490 feet (150 m) deep.

El Jorullo is one of two known volcanoes to have developed in Mexico in recent history. The second, born about 183 years later, was named Parícutin after a nearby village that it eventually destroyed. Parícutin is about 50 miles (80 km) northwest of El Jorullo.

El Jorullo was first erupted on 29 September 1759. Earthquakes occurred prior to this first day of eruption. Once the volcano started erupting, it continued for 15 years, eventually ending in 1774.

Alexander von Humboldt climbed El Jorullo during the Mexican portion of his scientific expedition to Spanish America. When he visited on 19 September 1803, its multiple cones were still smoldering and the air was extremely hot and filled with volcanic gases. He wrote a detailed description of the climb, noting that his face and those of his travel companions were burned. The volcano enriched the local soil and there was considerable vegetation. Humboldt sketched the volcano in the distance, showing multiple smoking cones. Humboldt undertook the climb with his scientific travel partner Aimé Bonpland, as well as a local Basque settler Ramón Epelde, and two local indigenous servants, whose names have not been recorded. Humboldt noted their assistance on site. Humboldt also notes that he consulted a 1782 publication Rusticatio Mexicana, by Rafael Landívar, who calculated the height of the volcano and the temperature of the thermal waters.

El Jorullo did not develop on a corn field like Parícutin did, but it did destroy what had been a rich agricultural area. It grew approximately 820 feet (250 meters) from the ground in the first six weeks. The eruptions from El Jorullo were primarily phreatic and phreatomagmatic. They covered the area with sticky mud flows, water flows and ash falls. All but the youngest lava flows were covered by this ash fall. Later eruptions from El Jorullo were magmatic with neither mud nor water flows. This 15 year eruption was the longest one El Jorullo has had, and was the longest cinder cone eruption known. Lava flows can still be seen to the north and west of the volcano. The eruption had a VEI of 4.

Parícutin and El Jorullo both rose in an area known for its volcanoes. Called the Trans-Mexican Volcanic Belt, the region stretches about 700 miles (1,100 km) from east to west across southern Mexico. The eruptive activity deposited a layer of volcanic rock some 6,000 feet thick, creating a high and fertile plateau. During summer months, the heights snag moisture-laden breezes from the Pacific Ocean; rich farmland, in turn, has made this belt the most populous region in Mexico. Though the region already boasted three of the country's four largest cities: Mexico City, Puebla, and Guadalajara (the area around Parícutin, some 200 miles west of the capital), it was still a peaceful backwater inhabited by Purépecha in the early 1940s. The crater and lake can now be reached by car.

== See also ==
- List of volcanoes in Mexico
