= Ulysses Colles =

Colles on Mars

- Image of main part of Ulysses Colles based on mosaic of CTX images
- Feature type: colles
- Coordinates: 6.1°N 236.9°E
- Naming: Classical albedo feature name.

Ulysses Colles is an official name for conical edifices associated with flows in Ulysses Fossae in the Tharsis quadrangle of Mars. These conical edifices form small volcanic field which were interpreted as result of explosive eruptions on Mars where martian equivalents to terrestrial pyroclastic cones, cinder cones respectively, exist. This field is situated north of the shield volcanoes Biblis Patera and Ulysses Patera and it is superposed on an old, elevated window of fractured crust of Ulysses Fossae, probably of early Hesperian age, which survived flooding by younger lava flows associated with plain-style volcanism in Tharsis.

The cones of Ulysses Colles are spread over an area of about 50 to 80 km and their spatial distribution seem to be controlled by N- to NNW-trending normal faults. The distribution is not random, more cones are located in the southern part, where are forming clusters of overlapping cones. Also, the southern cones seem to be more preserved than northern cones.

== Gallery ==
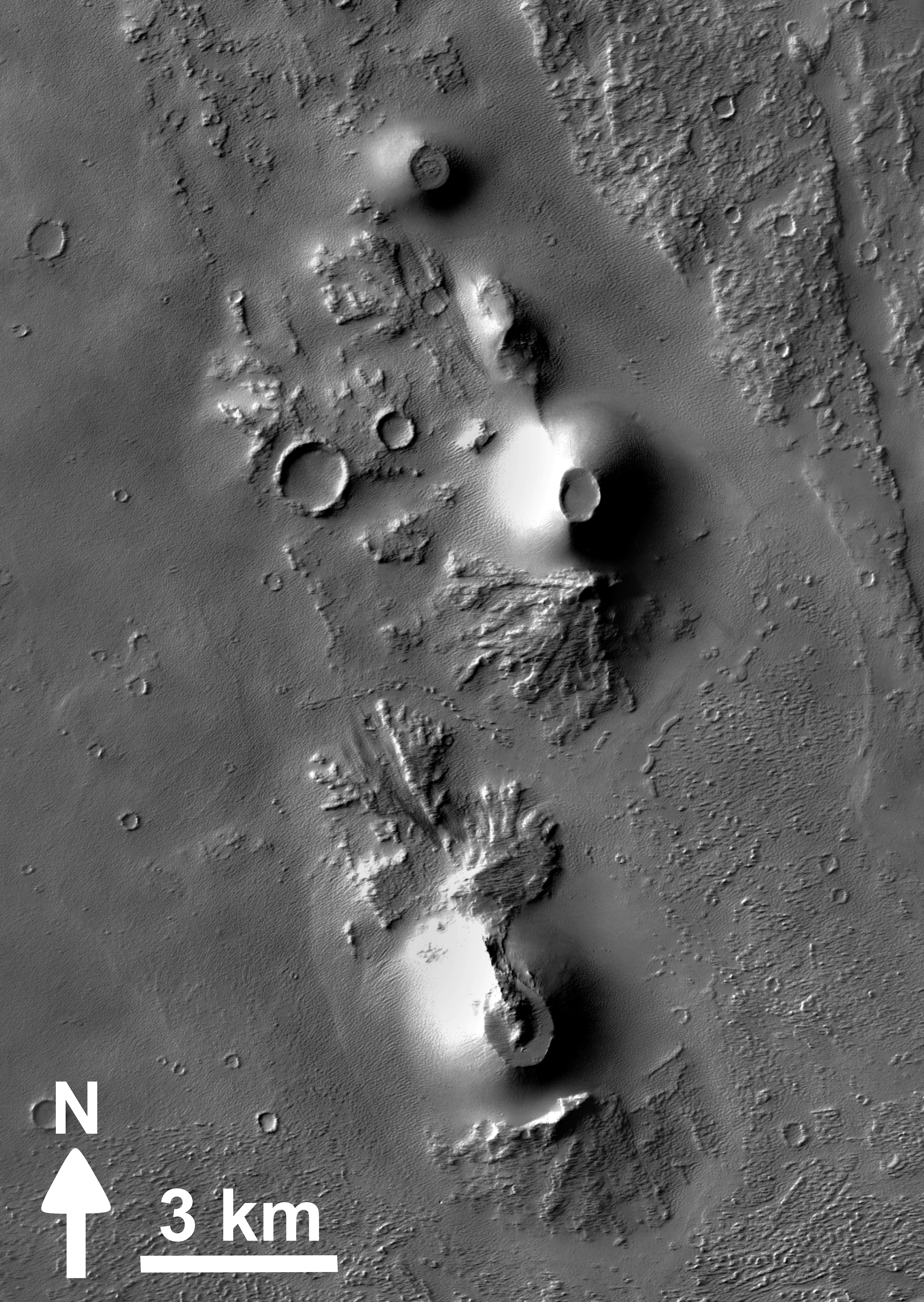
Close up view to small conical structures in Ulysses Colles

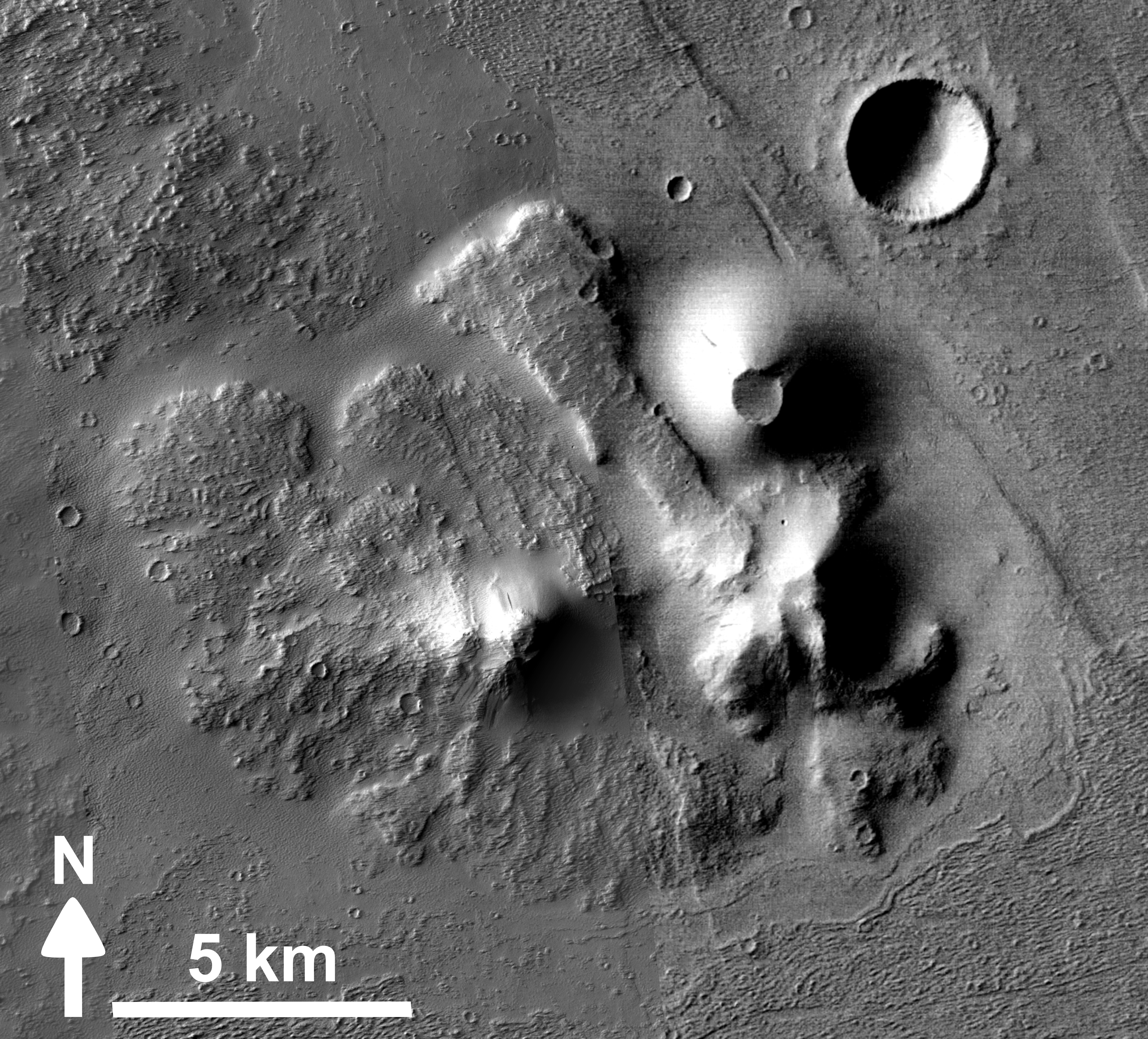
Another view
