= Siete Luminarias =

Group of extinct volcanoes in central Mexico

Siete Luminarias (Seven Luminaries) Natural Monument
- La Region Volcanica Siete Luminarias
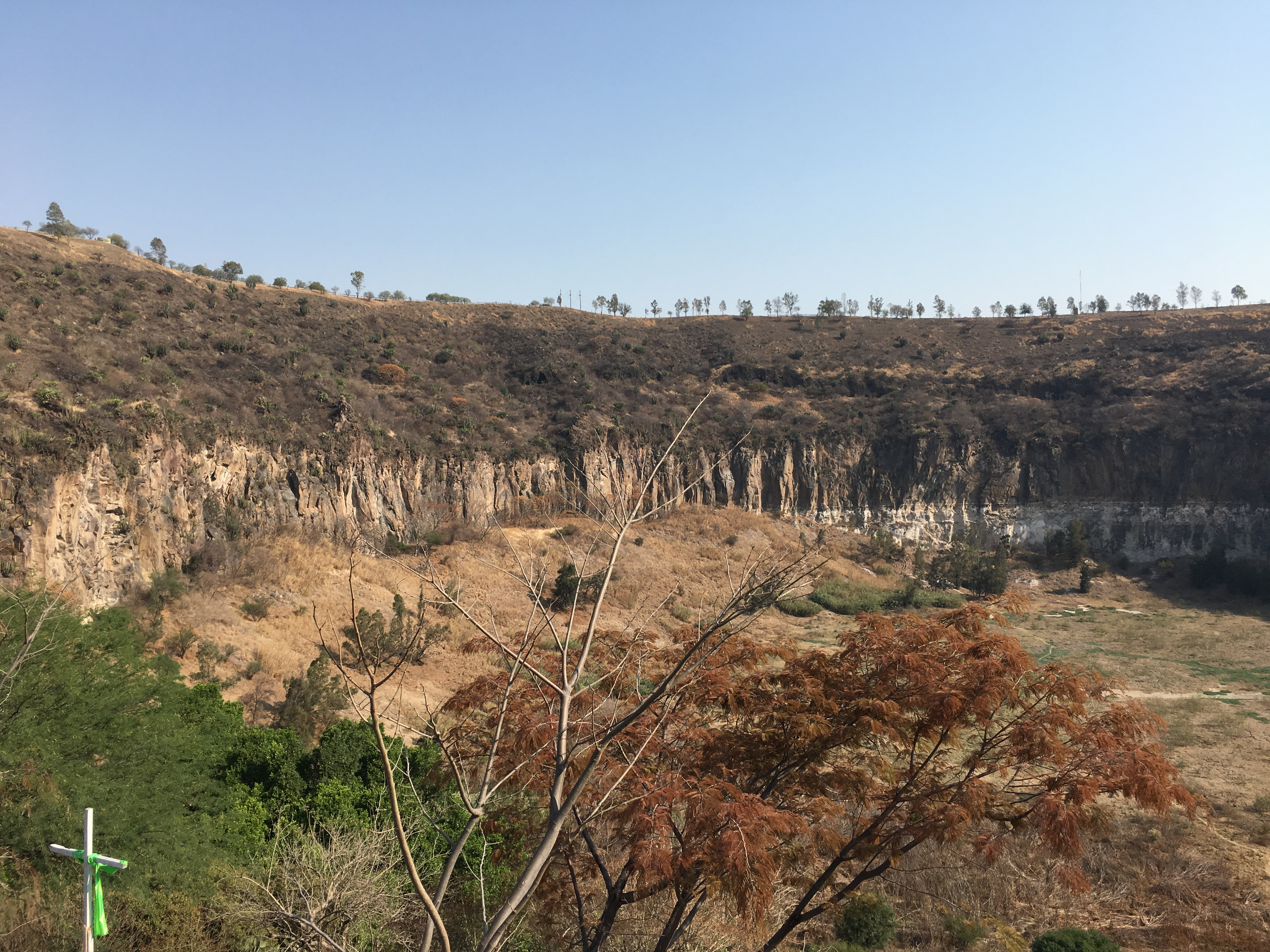
- Hoya la Alberca crater

- Location within Mexico
- Location: Guanajuato, Mexico
- Nearest city: Valle de Santiago
- Coordinates: 20°23′25.8″N 101°12′09.6″W
- Area: 89.28 km^{2} (34.47 sq mi)
- Designation: Natural Monument
- Designated: 1997
- Administrator: National Commission of Natural Protected Areas

Siete Luminarias (the Seven Luminarias) is a group of seven extinct volcanoes in central Mexico, located in and around the town of Valle de Santiago in the state of Guanajuato.

== Geography ==
The Siete Luminarias are low-rimmed volcanoes, or maars, with steep-sided, flat-bottomed central craters up to one kilometer in diameter. The seven craters are Hoya la Alberca (1672 meters elevation), Hoya de Cíntora (1703 m), Hoya de Flores or Hoya de Alvarez (2100 m), Rincón de Parangueo (2050 m), Hoya de San Nicolás de Parangueo (1820 m), Hoya Blanca (1819 m), and Hoya Solís (1787 m). The volcanoes are part of the Michoacán–Guanajuato volcanic field.

The Siete Luminarias are in the Bajío region, a fertile agricultural region in the southwestern portion of the Mexican Plateau. The Bajío is in the basin of the Lerma River, which flows from east to west to the north of the volcanoes.

Four craters – Rincón de Parangueo, San Nicolás de Parangono, La Alberca, and Cíntora – were formerly home to crater lakes, but over-extraction of groundwater has caused all these lakes to dry up.

== Flora and fauna ==
Siete Luminarias is in the Bajío dry forests ecoregion.

== Conservation ==
In 1997 Siete Luminarias was declared a natural monument by the government of Mexico. It covers an area of 89.28 km^{2} to the south, west, and northwest of the city of Valle de Santiago.
