= Natural monuments of Mexico =

Mexico's natural monuments (or Monumentos Naturales in Spanish) are protected natural areas.

Five areas – Bonampak, Cerro de La Silla, Río Bravo del Norte, Yagul, and Yaxchilán – are designated by the Mexican federal government and are administrated by the National Commission of Protected Natural Areas (CONANP). Six others are designated and administered by state governments.

CONANP defines Natural Madministeredonuments as areas that contain one or more natural elements, that have a unique character, aesthetic, historic, or scientific value, and that require absolute protection. Sites do not need to have a variety of ecosystems to be included in this category.

== List of natural monuments ==
As of September 2021, there were eleven sites in Mexico designated as natural monuments.

- Bernal de Horcasitas in Tamaulipas (156.77 km² km^{2}). Designated in 1997.
- Bonampak in Chiapas (43.57 km^{2}). Designated in 1993.
- Cerro del Muerto in Aguascalientes (58.36 km^{2}). Designated in 2008.
- Cerro de la Silla in Nuevo Leon (60.39 km^{2}). Designated in 1991.
- El Sótano de Las Golondrinas in San Luis Potosí (2.82 km^{2}). Designated in 2001.
- Gruta del Cerro Coconá in Tabasco (2.85 km^{2}). Designated in 1988.
- La Hoya de las Huahuas in San Luis Potosí (4.06 km^{2}). Designated in 2001.
- Río Bravo del Norte Natural Monument in Coahuila (21.75 km^{2}). Designated in 2009.
- Siete Luminarias Volcanic Region in Guanajuato (89.28 km^{2}). Designated in 1997.
- Yagul in Oaxaca (10.76 km^{2}). Designated in 1999.
- Yaxchilan in Chiapas (26.21 km^{2}). Designated in 1992.
