= Valle de Santiago =

- Municipio
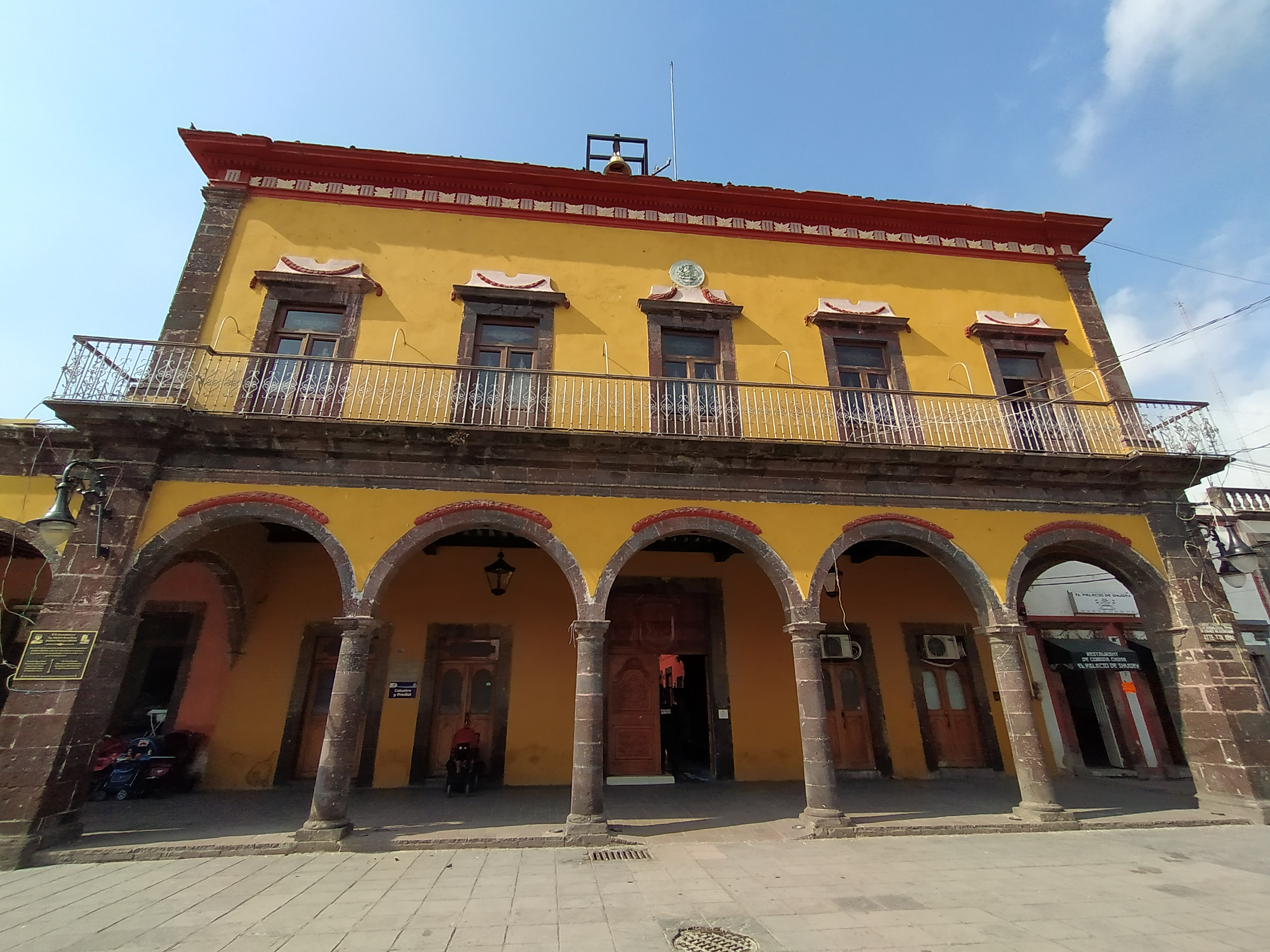
- The city hall of Valle de Santiago

- Coat of arms

- Location in Guanajuato Valle de Santiago (Mexico)
- Coordinates: 20.39198°N 101.18160°W
- Country: Mexico
- State: Guanajuato

Area
  - Municipality: 819.6 km^{2} (316.4 sq mi)
  - Seat: 13.72 km^{2} (5.30 sq mi)

Population (2020 census)
  - Municipality: 150,054
  - Density: 183.1/km^{2} (474.2/sq mi)
  - Seat: 72,663
  - Seat density: 5,296/km^{2} (13,720/sq mi)

Valle de Santiago is a municipio (municipality) in the Mexican state of Guanajuato, and also the name of its largest township and cabecera municipal (municipal seat). The municipality is located in the southern portion of the state in the Bajío region of central Mexico, and has an area of some 819.6 square kilometres (316.4 sq mi). The city of Valle de Santiago lies at an elevation of 1,744 metres (5,722 ft) in the east-central part of the municipality, approximately 90 kilometres (56 mi) south of the state capital, Guanajuato.

== History ==
The settlement was founded in 1607 by Pedro Martínez Rincón, Pedro Rivera, Diego Tamayo, Francisco Gómez, Francisco Santoyo, Silvestre de Aguirre, Luis Fonseca, Antonio Estrada, Andrés Cuéllar and Juan Martínez.

As of the 2010 census, the city had a population of 68,058 (the ninth-largest community in the state), while the municipality had a population of 141,058.

== Volcanic Craters ==
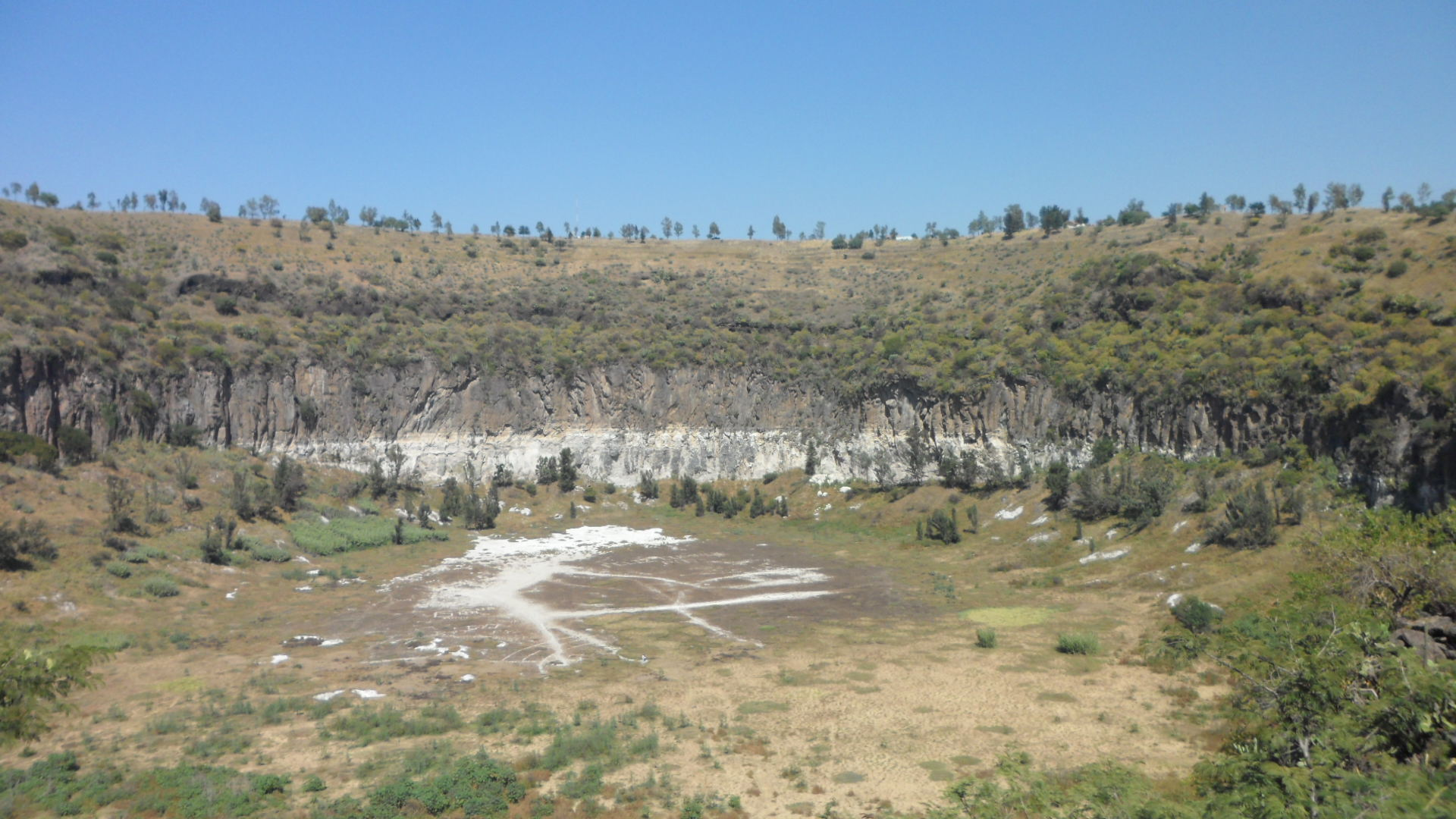
La Alberca currently.

Over 30 inactive volcanic craters are located in Valle de Santiago, but only 7 of those are recognized, and protected as they have been declared a national monument. The seven volcanic craters are known as Siete Luminarias and include Cíntora, Hoyas de Santa Rosa, La Alberca, San Nicolás de Parangueo, Blanca, Estrada, Álvarez and Solís. Many of these craters naturally evolved into crater-lakes, and they would later become recreational spots. La Alberca, which translates to "the pool", was once an abundant lake that just over 40 years ago was filled with fresh water, but due to human activity has now dried up and been populated with cacti and shrubs. One of the biggest factors for the current state of these now dried crater lakes is the over extraction of groundwater for both water supply and irrigation. The government has banned groundwater extraction and they are making various efforts to conserve the condition of these seven craters and prevent further damage. Since the Siete Luminarias are essential for agriculture and wildlife, there is a large amount of effort being pushed towards their preservation.

== Climate ==
Climate data for Valle de Santiago (1991–2020 normals, extremes 1922–present)
Month	Jan	Feb	Mar	Apr	May	Jun	Jul	Aug	Sep	Oct	Nov	Dec	Year
Record high °C (°F)	33 (91)	35 (95)	43.5 (110.3)	43 (109)	45 (113)	40 (104)	40 (104)	40 (104)	41 (106)	34 (93)	39 (102)	34 (93)	45 (113)
Mean daily maximum °C (°F)	23.9 (75.0)	25.8 (78.4)	28.1 (82.6)	30.4 (86.7)	31.6 (88.9)	30.0 (86.0)	27.9 (82.2)	27.7 (81.9)	27.2 (81.0)	27.0 (80.6)	26.0 (78.8)	24.4 (75.9)	27.5 (81.5)
Daily mean °C (°F)	14.7 (58.5)	16.3 (61.3)	18.6 (65.5)	20.8 (69.4)	22.6 (72.7)	22.3 (72.1)	21.1 (70.0)	20.7 (69.3)	20.3 (68.5)	19.0 (66.2)	17.1 (62.8)	15.2 (59.4)	19.1 (66.4)
Mean daily minimum °C (°F)	5.4 (41.7)	6.8 (44.2)	9.1 (48.4)	11.2 (52.2)	13.6 (56.5)	14.7 (58.5)	14.2 (57.6)	13.8 (56.8)	13.5 (56.3)	11.0 (51.8)	8.2 (46.8)	5.9 (42.6)	10.6 (51.1)
Record low °C (°F)	−6 (21)	−5 (23)	−2 (28)	−0.5 (31.1)	5 (41)	3 (37)	8 (46)	7.5 (45.5)	4 (39)	−1.5 (29.3)	−6 (21)	−7 (19)	−7 (19)
Average precipitation mm (inches)	12.9 (0.51)	13.1 (0.52)	10.5 (0.41)	5.2 (0.20)	31.5 (1.24)	113.0 (4.45)	149.4 (5.88)	148.3 (5.84)	124.0 (4.88)	46.1 (1.81)	13.8 (0.54)	4.4 (0.17)	672.2 (26.46)
Average precipitation days (≥ 0.1 mm)	2.4	1.6	1.9	1.9	5.2	11.2	15.3	14.9	12.0	5.2	2.1	1.1	74.8
Source: Servicio Meteorológico Nacional
