= Cinder cone =

Steep hill of pyroclastic fragments around a volcanic vent

Schematic of the internal structure of a typical cinder cone

A cinder cone or scoria cone is a steep, conical landform of loose pyroclastic fragments, such as volcanic ash, clinkers, or scoria, that has been built around a volcanic vent. The pyroclastic fragments are formed by explosive eruptions or tall Hawaiian-style lava fountains from a single, typically cylindrical, vent.

As the gas-charged lava is blown violently into the air, it breaks into small fragments that solidify and fall as either scoria (which is also referred to as cinder) and clinker around the vent to form a cone that is often symmetrical, with slopes between 30° and 40° and a nearly circular base. Most cinder cones have a bowl-shaped crater at the summit.

== Mechanics of eruption ==
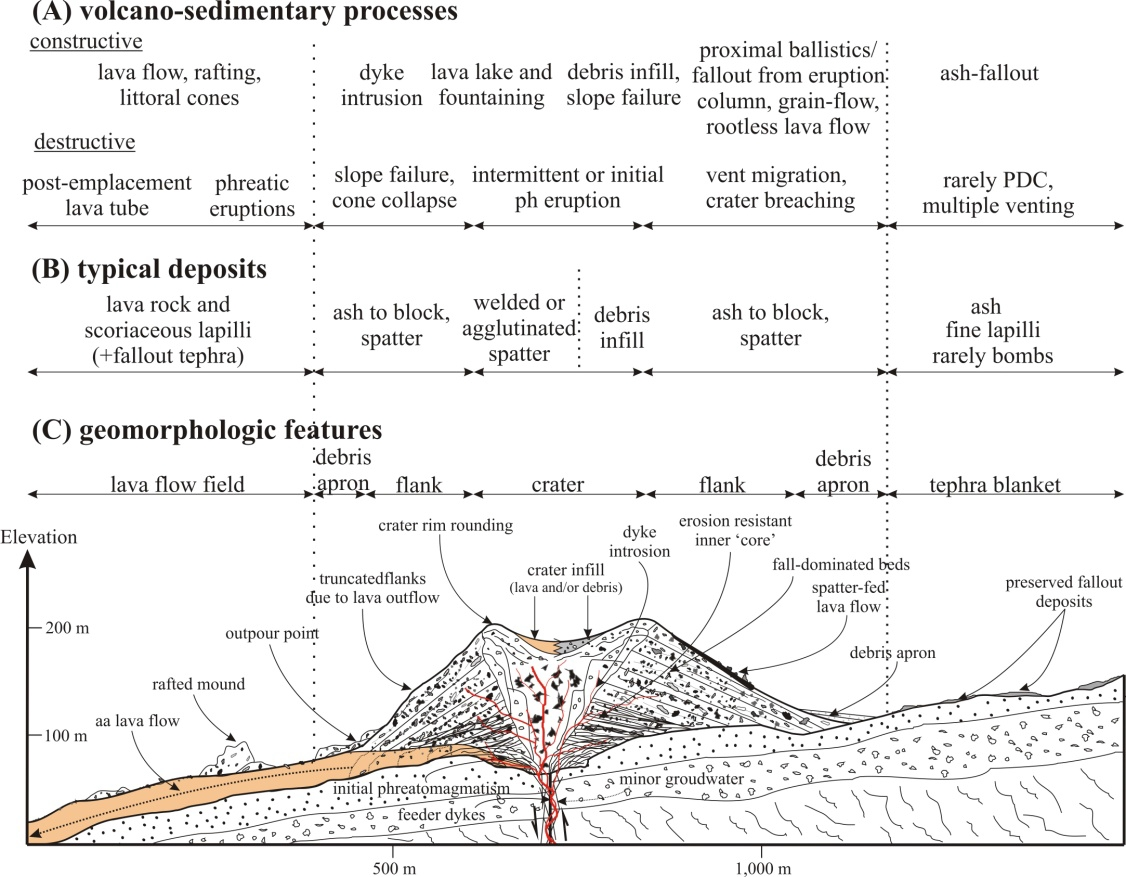
Cross-section diagram of a cinder cone or scoria cone

Cinder cones range in size from tens to hundreds of meters tall. They are composed of loose pyroclastic material (cinder or scoria), which distinguishes them from spatter cones, which are composed of agglomerated volcanic bombs.

The pyroclastic material making up a cinder cone is usually basaltic to andesitic in composition. It is often glassy and contains numerous gas bubbles "frozen" into place as magma exploded into the air and then cooled quickly. Lava fragments larger than 64 mm across, known as volcanic bombs, are also a common product of cinder cone eruptions.

The growth of a cinder cone may be divided into four stages. In the first stage, a low-rimmed scoria ring forms around the erupting event. During the second stage, the rim is built up and a talus slope begins to form outside the rim. The third stage is characterized by slumping and blasts that destroy the original rim, while the fourth stage is characterized by the buildup of talus beyond the zone where cinder falls to the surface (the ballistic zone).

During the waning stage of a cinder cone eruption, the magma has lost most of its gas content. This gas-depleted magma does not fountain but oozes quietly into the crater or beneath the base of the cone as lava. Lava rarely issues from the top (except as a fountain) because the loose, uncemented cinders are too weak to support the pressure exerted by molten rock as it rises toward the surface through the central vent. Because it contains so few gas bubbles, the molten lava is denser than the bubble-rich cinders. Thus, it often burrows out along the bottom of the cinder cone, lifting the less dense cinders like corks on water, and advances outward, creating a lava flow around the cone's base. When the eruption ends, a symmetrical cone of cinders sits at the center of a surrounding pad of lava. If the crater is fully breached, the remaining walls form an amphitheater or horseshoe shape around the vent.

== Occurrence ==
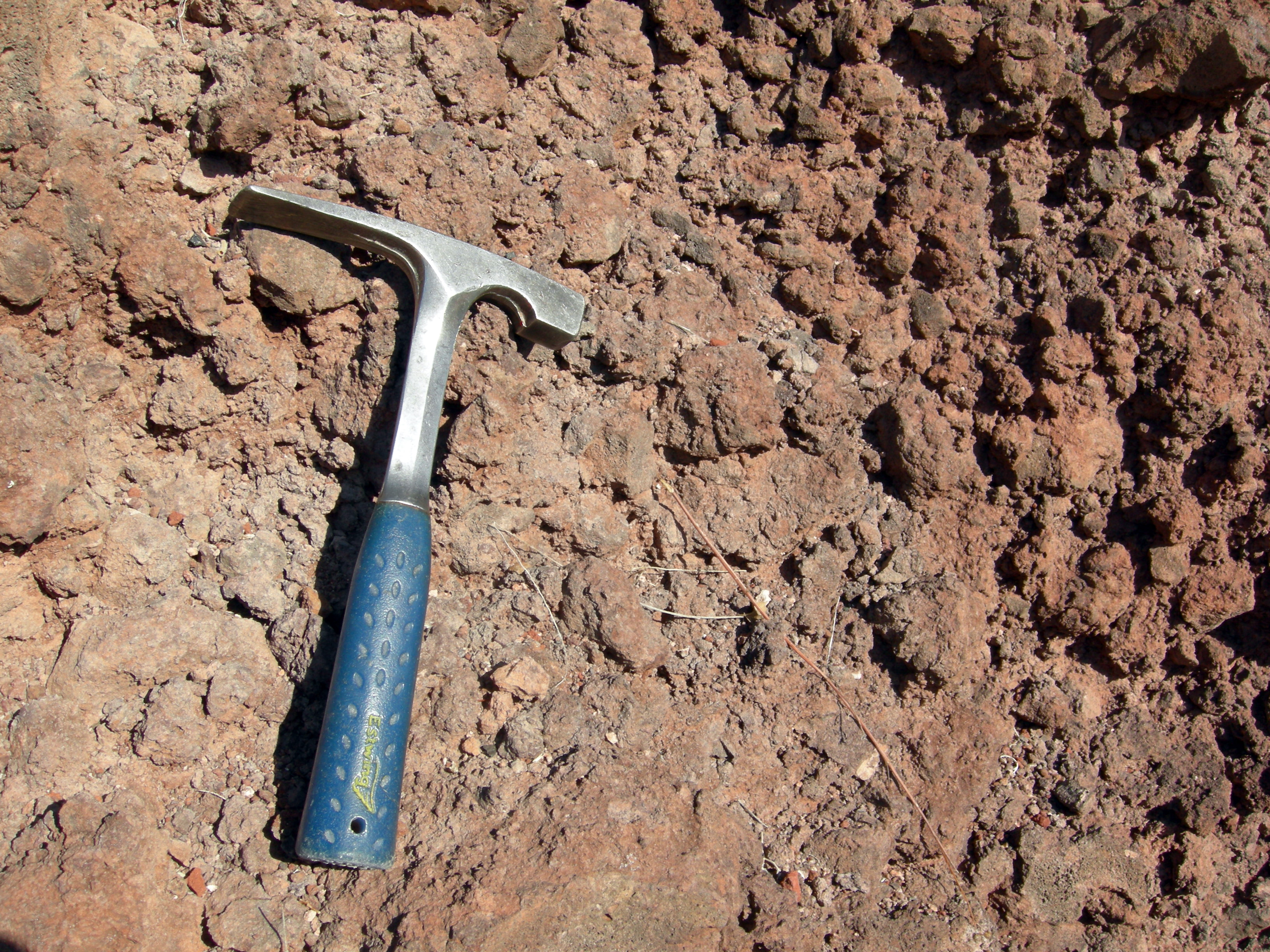
Cinders at a cinder cone in San Bernardino Valley, Arizona

Basaltic cinder cones are the most characteristic type of volcano associated with intraplate volcanism. They are particularly common in association with alkaline magmatism, in which the erupted lava is enriched in sodium and potassium oxides.

Cinder cones are also commonly found on the flanks of shield volcanoes, stratovolcanoes, and calderas. For example, geologists have identified nearly 100 cinder cones on the flanks of Mauna Kea, a shield volcano located on the island of Hawaii. Such cinder cones likely represent the final stages of activity of a mafic volcano. However, most volcanic cones formed in Hawaiian-type eruptions are spatter cones rather than cinder cones, due to the fluid nature of the lava.

The most famous cinder cone, Paricutin, grew out of a corn field in Mexico in 1943 from a new vent. Eruptions continued for nine years, built the cone to a height of 424 meters (1,391 ft), and produced lava flows that covered 25 km^{2} (9.7 mi^{2}).

The Earth's most historically active cinder cone is Cerro Negro in Nicaragua. It is part of a group of four young cinder cones NW of Las Pilas volcano. Since its initial eruption in 1850, it has erupted more than 20 times, most recently in 1995 and 1999.

Satellite images suggest that cinder cones occur on other terrestrial bodies in the Solar System. On Mars, they have been reported on the flanks of Pavonis Mons in Tharsis, in the region of Hydraotes Chaos on the bottom of the Coprates Chasma, or in the volcanic field Ulysses Colles. It is also suggested that domical structures in Marius Hills (on the Moon) might represent lunar cinder cones.

== Effect of environmental conditions ==
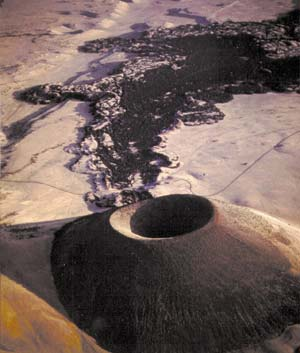
SP Crater, an extinct cinder cone in Arizona

The size and shape of cinder cones depend on environmental properties as different gravity and/or atmospheric pressure might change the dispersion of ejected scoria particles. For example, cinder cones on Mars seem to be more than two times wider than terrestrial analogues as lower atmospheric pressure and gravity enable wider dispersion of ejected particles over a larger area. Therefore, it seems that erupted amount of material is not sufficient on Mars for the flank slopes to attain the angle of repose and Martian cinder cones seem to be ruled mainly by ballistic distribution and not by material redistribution on flanks as typical on Earth.

Cinder cones often are highly symmetric, but strong prevailing winds at the time of eruption can cause a greater accumulation of cinder on the downwind side of the vent.

== Monogenetic cones ==
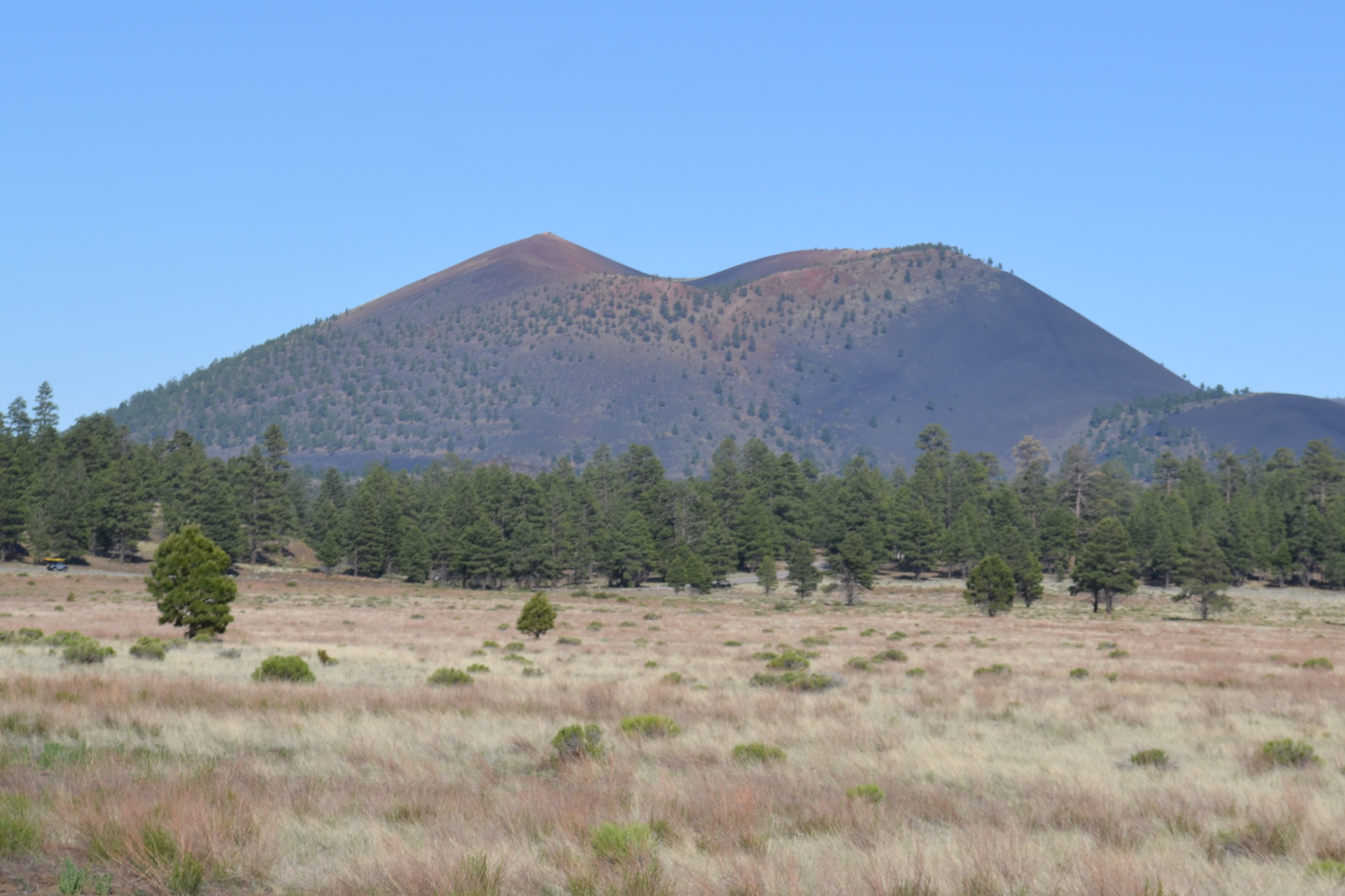
Sunset Crater, a young monogenetic cinder cone in Arizona that began forming around the year 1075 CE

Some cinder cones are monogenetic, forming from a single short eruptive episode that produces a very small volume of lava. The eruption typically last just weeks or months, but can occasionally last fifteen years or longer. Parícutin in Mexico, Diamond Head, Koko Head, Punchbowl Crater, Mt Le Brun from the Coalstoun Lakes volcanic field, and some cinder cones on Mauna Kea are monogenetic cinder cones. However, not all cinder cones are monogenetic, with some ancient cinder cones showing intervals of soil formation between flows that indicate that eruptions were separated by thousands to tens of thousands of years.

Monogenetic cones likely form when the rate of magma supply to a volcanic field is very low and the eruptions are spread out in space and time. This prevents any one eruption from establishing a system of "plumbing" that would provide an easy path to the surface for subsequent eruptions. Thus each eruption must find its independent path to the surface.

== See also ==
- List of cinder cones
- Volcanic cone – Landform of ejecta from a volcanic vent piled up in a conical shape
- Capulin Volcano National Monument – U.S. National Monument in New Mexico
