= Villa Juárez, Aguascalientes =

Villa Juárez
- Municipality
- Municipality location in Aguascalientes

- Location in Mexico
- Coordinates: 22°05′41″N 102°04′10″W
- Country: Mexico
- State: Aguascalientes

Government
  - Federal electoral district: Aguascalientes's 1st

Population (2020)
  - Total: 26,667
- Time zone: UTC-6 (Zona Centro)

Villa Juárez is a town and one of the 12 municipalities of Aguascalientes, in central-eastern Mexico. The municipality has an approximate population of 26,667 according to the 2020 census.

It was elevated to the category of municipality on August 18, 2026, after a vote by the local congress, obtaining 19 out of 22 votes in favor and separating from the municipality of Asientos.

== History ==
Since the late 20th century, there have been proposals to secede Villa Juárez from the municipality of Asientos and form a new municipality.

The initiative to form the new municipality was formally presented on May 14, 2026. The proposal was approved by the LXVI Legislature of the Congress of the State of Aguascalientes on August 28, 2026, with the support of 19 of the 27 deputies of the congress.

== Geography ==
The municipality of Villa Juárez is bordered to the north by the municipalities of Asientos and Tepezalá; to the west by San Francisco de los Romo and Pabellón de Arteaga; to the south by the municipalities of Aguascalientes and El Llano; and to the east by the municipality of Ojuelos de Jalisco, belonging to the state of Jalisco, and by the municipality of Villa García, located in the state of Zacatecas.

== Demography ==
The municipality comprises 112 localities, which in the 2020 census had a population of 26,667.
