= Cosío =

Municipality in the Mexican state of Aguascalientes

- Municipality
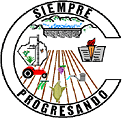
- Coat of arms
- Interactive map

- Location in Mexico Cosío (Mexico)
- Coordinates: 22°22′N 102°18′W
- Country: Mexico
- State: Aguascalientes
- Municipal seat: Cosío

Government
  - Federal electoral district: Aguascalientes's 1st

Area
  - Total: 129.21 km^{2} (49.89 sq mi)

Population (2020)
  - Total: 17,000
  - Density: 130/km^{2} (340/sq mi)

Cosio is a municipality and town in the Mexican state of Aguascalientes. It stands at 22°22′N 102°18′W. The municipal seat is the town of Cosío. As of 2020, the town of Cosío had a population of 17,000.

== Name ==
There are conflicting accounts on the person after whom Cosío was named; though it is primarily said to have been named after either Felipe Cosío, former Governor of Aguascalientes; or Luis de Cosío, who had an instrumental part in helping Cosío become a municipality.

== Coat of Arms ==
A large outline of the letter C framing the other elements holds the town motto, "Siempre Progresando." At the top, a simplified illustration the landscape. On the left, a map of the territory with a maguey plant, a cactus, a church, main roads, and a bee representing its inhabitant's industriousness. On the right, a book with the symbol for writing or a torch. At the bottom, cultivated land with a tractor, watering equipment, and commonly cultivated crops including grapes.

== History ==
=== Founding ===
Cosío was founded December 28, 1857.

Prior to its establishment, the area was part of neighboring municipality Rincon de Romos and belonged to the San Jacinto hacienda, owned by Pío Bermejillo. A tenant of the hacienda, Cornelio Acosta, asked for permission to build in the area and founded Natillas Ranch. Due to its positioning at the northernmost part of Aguascalientes, Natillas was used as a rest stop for those traveling between the state and the bordering state of Zacatecas.

== Demographics ==
Historical population
Year	Pop.	±%
2010	15,042	—
2015	15,577	+3.6%
2020	17,000	+9.1%

=== 2010 ===
In 2010, the municipality had a total population of 15,042.

As of 2010, the town of Cosío had a population of 4,898. Other than the town of Cosío, the municipality had 85 localities, the largest of which (with 2010 populations in parentheses) were: La Punta (2,416), El Refugio de Providencia (Providencia) (1,377), El Salero (1,229), and Santa María de la Paz (1,026), classified as rural.

=== 2020 ===
==== Population ====
By 2020, the population increased to 17,000.

2020 Census Demographics
	Count	Percent
Female	8708	51.2%
Male	8292	48.8%
Disabled	805	0.05%
Indigenous	15	0.0009%
Afro-Mexican	2155	0.13%
Elderly (65+)	1118	0.07%

== Geography ==
=== Climate ===
Steppe climate with warm summers, an average temperature of 63.1°F. The hottest months are May through August; the coldest are December through February. The average rainfall is 16.59". Frosts last from 20 to 40 days a year. The dominant trade winds are from the northeast to the southeast during the summer and part of the fall.

Climate data for Cosío (1991–2020)
Month	Jan	Feb	Mar	Apr	May	Jun	Jul	Aug	Sep	Oct	Nov	Dec	Year
Record high °C (°F)	28.0 (82.4)	32.0 (89.6)	32.0 (89.6)	34.0 (93.2)	36.0 (96.8)	36.0 (96.8)	34.0 (93.2)	32.0 (89.6)	31.5 (88.7)	32.0 (89.6)	31.0 (87.8)	28.0 (82.4)	36.0 (96.8)
Mean daily maximum °C (°F)	20.4 (68.7)	22.6 (72.7)	25.1 (77.2)	27.4 (81.3)	28.9 (84.0)	28.1 (82.6)	26.5 (79.7)	26.2 (79.2)	25.0 (77.0)	24.4 (75.9)	22.5 (72.5)	20.7 (69.3)	24.8 (76.6)
Daily mean °C (°F)	11.9 (53.4)	13.6 (56.5)	16.0 (60.8)	18.4 (65.1)	20.2 (68.4)	20.3 (68.5)	19.3 (66.7)	19.1 (66.4)	18.3 (64.9)	16.9 (62.4)	14.2 (57.6)	12.2 (54.0)	16.7 (62.1)
Mean daily minimum °C (°F)	3.4 (38.1)	4.7 (40.5)	6.8 (44.2)	9.4 (48.9)	11.6 (52.9)	12.5 (54.5)	12.1 (53.8)	12.0 (53.6)	11.7 (53.1)	9.4 (48.9)	5.9 (42.6)	3.7 (38.7)	8.6 (47.5)
Record low °C (°F)	−5.0 (23.0)	−4.0 (24.8)	−0.5 (31.1)	1.0 (33.8)	3.0 (37.4)	7.0 (44.6)	8.5 (47.3)	8.0 (46.4)	3.5 (38.3)	1.0 (33.8)	−2.5 (27.5)	−7.0 (19.4)	−7.0 (19.4)
Average precipitation mm (inches)	22.8 (0.90)	12.3 (0.48)	4.3 (0.17)	5.9 (0.23)	18.1 (0.71)	71.0 (2.80)	103.5 (4.07)	80.2 (3.16)	82.7 (3.26)	31.2 (1.23)	12.2 (0.48)	10.6 (0.42)	454.8 (17.91)
Average precipitation days (≥ 0.1 mm)	2.6	1.4	1.3	1.3	3.7	8.8	10.8	9.4	9.7	4.0	2.3	1.6	56.9
Source: Servicio Meteorologico Nacional

=== Main Highways ===
==== Federal ====
- Carretera Federal 45
- Carretera Federal 45D

==== State ====
- Carretera Estatal 25
- Carretera Estatal 26
- Carretera Estatal 39
- Carretera Estatal 50
- Carretera Estatal 62
- Carretera Estatal 64
- Carretera Estatal 147

=== Neighboring Municipalities ===
- Cuauhtémoc, Zacatecas – north-east
- Rincón de Romos – south
- Luis Moya, Zacatecas – north-west

==== Distances ====
- Aguascalientes: 34 miles.
- Asientos: 27 miles.
- Calvillo 66 miles.
- Jesús María 30 miles.
- Rincón de Romos 9 miles.

== Economy ==
=== Main Sectors, Products, and Services ===
==== Agriculture ====
Most of the municipality's agriculture is irrigated.

===== Perennial =====
- grapes
- alfalfa

===== Spring and Summer =====
- corn
- beans
- chili peppers
- potatoes
- broccoli
- peas
- sorghum

===== Autumn and Winter =====
- garlic
- oats
- canary seed

==== Livestock ====
- Criollo cattle
- Charolais cattle
- Zebu cattle

==== Industry ====
Small industrial plants and workshops, a glove assembly plant, a children's clothing factory, balcony workshops and some extraction of minerals.

==== Commerce ====
Many commercial establishments, grocery stores, butcher shops and bakeries.

==== Services ====
Telephone services and means of transport such as taxis and buses are offered.

==== Fishing ====
Fishing can be practiced in the Natillas dam, a body of water mostly populated with bass, tilapia and mojarra.

=== Socioeconomic Status ===
2020 Population Breakdown by Multidimensional Conditions of Poverty
	Population		Compared to State
Vulnerability	Count	Percent	Compared to State
Social Only	5138	32.2%	+6.6%
Economic Only	1583	9.9%	-1.2%
Moderate Poverty	5366	33.7%	+8.5%
Extreme Poverty	538	3.4%	+1%
Not Vulnerable	3316	20.8	+14.9%

=== Lack of Access to Basic Necessities ===
==== Access to Utilities ====
2020 Breakdown of Lack of Access to Utilities in the Home
	Population Lacking Access			
Necessity	Count (thousands)	%	Households	%
Water	3.1	18.1%	671	17.1%
Plumbing	0.2	1.3%	61	1.6%
Electricity	0.1	0.3%	14	0.4%
Chimneys (when cooking with wood or charcoal indoors)	0.3	1.5%	70	1.8%

==== Housing Issues ====
2020 Breakdown of Quality & Space Issues in Homes
	Population Experiencing Issue			
Issue	Count (thousands)	%	Households	%
Dirt Floors	0.2	1.0%	31	0.8%
Flimsy Roofing	0.1	0.7%	25	0.6%
Flimsy Walls	0.1	0.9%	31	0.8%
Overcrowded Homes	1.3	7.7%	196	5.0%
