= Rincón de Romos =

- City
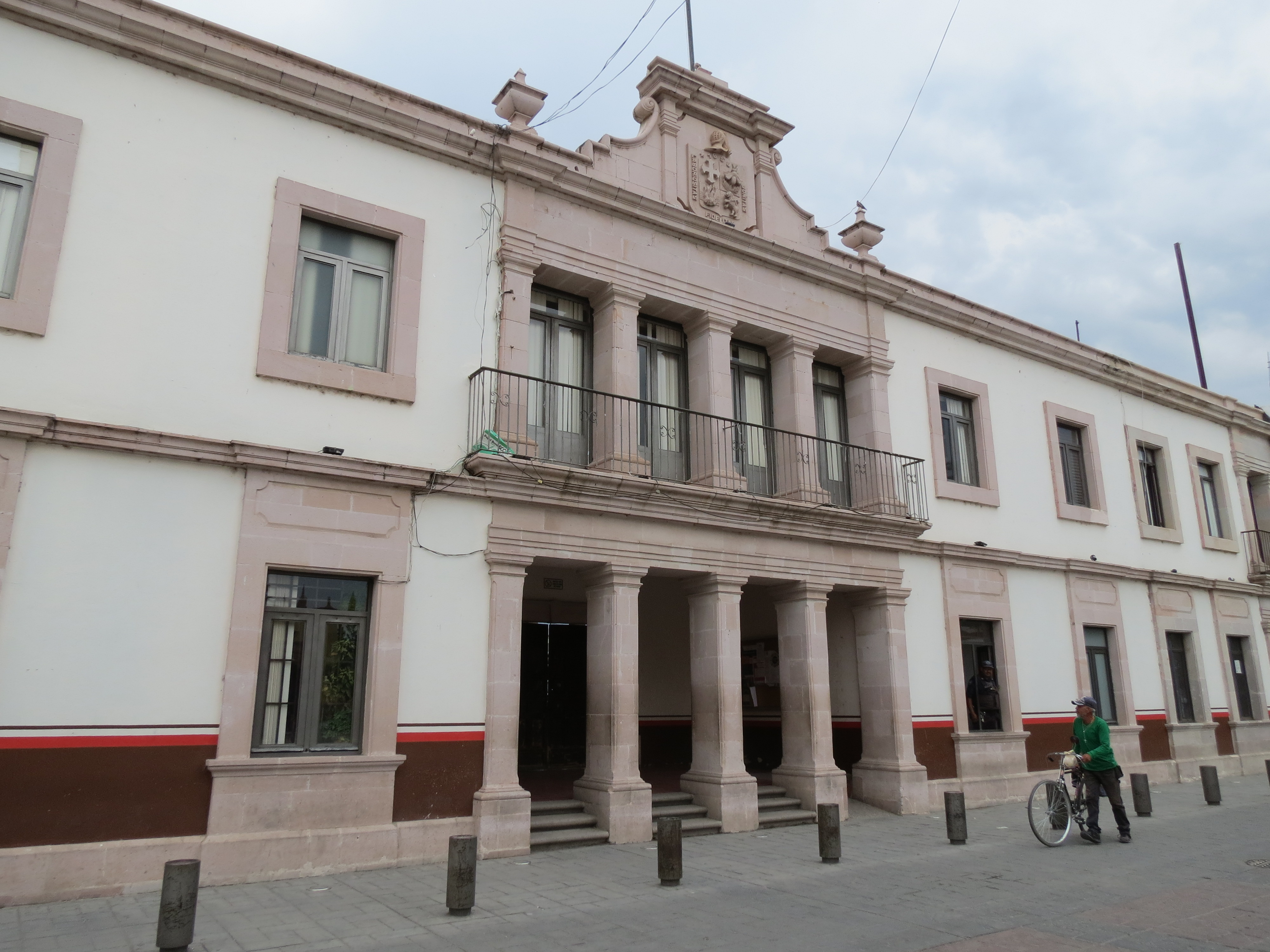
- Municipal Palace

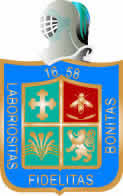
- Coat of arms

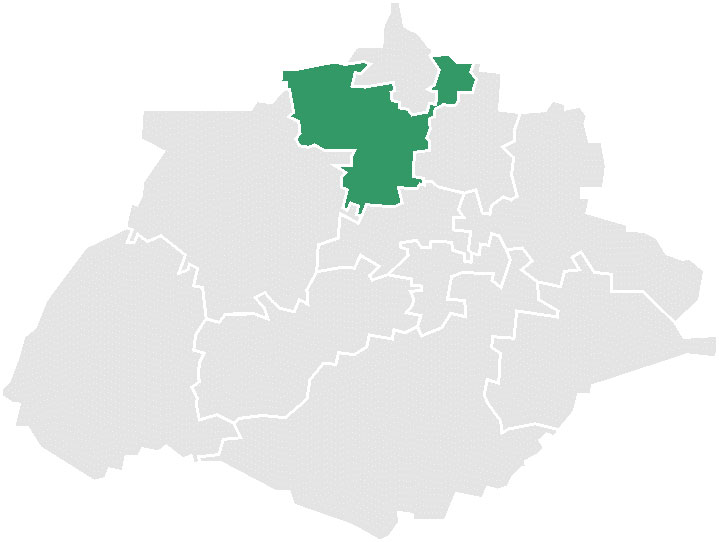
- Municipality location in Aguascalientes

- Location in Mexico
- Coordinates: 22°14′N 102°19′W
- Country: Mexico
- State: Aguascalientes
- Municipality: Rincón de Romos

Government
  - Federal electoral district: Aguascalientes's 1st

Population (2019)
  - Total: 94,978

Rincón de Romos is a municipality and city in the Mexican state of Aguascalientes. Located in the northern part of the state, the city serves as the municipal seat of the surrounding municipality Rincón de Romos.

As of 2010, the city had a total population of 27,988.

Most of the inhabitants of Rincón de Romos are Catholic. Rincón de Romos celebrates a "Fiesta" to the Señor de las Angustias on January with dances and pyrotechnic games. There is a church to him downtown. Most of the locals work as teachers. The city was once home to a priest named Padre Nieves who people believed made miracles. He has a church in the city, and many people go to Rincón de Romos to pray for miracles. Rincón de Romos has the biggest rural hospital ruled by the government of Aguascalientes.

Rincón de Romos is a town located in the central-northern region of Aguascalientes, Mexico. In 1639, the Real Audiencia of Guadalajara authorized the creation of a little town, which became known throughout time as Chora. In 1658, Captain Diego Romo de Vivar y Pérez, a member of a noble family belonging to the House of Vivar, bought the majority of the land of Hacienda de Rincón from Don Pedro Rincon of Arteaga. This deal combined both names and changed the town name of Chora to Rincón de Romos.

Rincón de Romos borders the municipality of Cosío on the north, Pabellón de Arteaga to the south, Tepezalá on the east and San Jose de Gracia on the west. It is divided into 64 towns, of which the most important are the municipal capitals: Rincón de Romos, the town of Pabellón de Hidalgo, Pablo Escaleras, San Jacinto and El Bajio. It makes up a surface area of 372.93 square meters, representing 6.7% of the state's territory. Rincón de Romos is part of the province of the Sierra Madre Occidental. In the province of the Mesa Central are semi-flat zones in the center and northeastern parts of the city, as well as flat areas in the center and northeast between the Fria and Loreto mountains.

== Geography ==
=== Climate ===
Rincón de Romos has a dry climate, with an average temperature of 18 °C in the hottest months of May and August. Its annual precipitation is approximately 400 millimeters. The wind generally moves from north to southeast in the summer and part of fall.

Climate data for Rincón de Romos (1991–2020)
Month	Jan	Feb	Mar	Apr	May	Jun	Jul	Aug	Sep	Oct	Nov	Dec	Year
Record high °C (°F)	28.0 (82.4)	32.0 (89.6)	35.0 (95.0)	37.0 (98.6)	38.0 (100.4)	38.0 (100.4)	36.0 (96.8)	34.0 (93.2)	36.0 (96.8)	32.0 (89.6)	31.0 (87.8)	28.0 (82.4)	38.0 (100.4)
Mean daily maximum °C (°F)	20.9 (69.6)	23.3 (73.9)	26.4 (79.5)	29.6 (85.3)	31.3 (88.3)	30.3 (86.5)	27.5 (81.5)	27.2 (81.0)	25.3 (77.5)	24.9 (76.8)	23.2 (73.8)	21.4 (70.5)	25.9 (78.6)
Daily mean °C (°F)	11.4 (52.5)	13.5 (56.3)	16.1 (61.0)	18.8 (65.8)	20.6 (69.1)	20.6 (69.1)	19.1 (66.4)	18.7 (65.7)	17.4 (63.3)	16.0 (60.8)	13.9 (57.0)	11.9 (53.4)	16.5 (61.7)
Mean daily minimum °C (°F)	2.0 (35.6)	3.7 (38.7)	5.9 (42.6)	8.0 (46.4)	9.9 (49.8)	10.9 (51.6)	10.6 (51.1)	10.3 (50.5)	9.5 (49.1)	7.1 (44.8)	4.6 (40.3)	2.5 (36.5)	7.1 (44.8)
Record low °C (°F)	−8.0 (17.6)	−5.0 (23.0)	−2.0 (28.4)	0.0 (32.0)	3.0 (37.4)	4.0 (39.2)	5.0 (41.0)	5.0 (41.0)	0.0 (32.0)	−4.0 (24.8)	−6.0 (21.2)	−13.0 (8.6)	−13.0 (8.6)
Average precipitation mm (inches)	19.4 (0.76)	10.9 (0.43)	5.9 (0.23)	3.8 (0.15)	17.3 (0.68)	62.2 (2.45)	102.0 (4.02)	88.9 (3.50)	78.1 (3.07)	35.8 (1.41)	10.4 (0.41)	9.6 (0.38)	444.3 (17.49)
Average precipitation days (≥ 0.1 mm)	2.2	1.4	1.0	0.8	3.3	7.3	10.6	9.7	9.0	3.8	1.7	1.4	52.2
Source: Servicio Meteorológico Nacional

== Demographics ==
Historical population
Year	Pop.	±%
2010	49,156	—
2015	53,866	+9.6%
2020	57,369	+6.5%

As of 2010, the municipality had a total population of 49,156.

As of 2010, the city of Rincón de Romos had a population of 27,988. Other than the city of Rincón de Romos, the municipality had 355 localities, the largest of which (with 2010 populations in parentheses) were: Pabellón de Hidalgo (4,316), Escaleras (2,790), classified as urban, and San Jacinto (2,356), and El Bajío (1,278), classified as rural.

== Religion ==
In 2000, according to the census done by Inegi, the population of Catholics 5 years and older rose to 76,789, while the non-Catholics in the same age range totaled 5,079 people.

== Economy ==
The Panamerican Highway plays an important role in trade. There are also mercury mines and copper, which are exploding industries.

=== Agriculture ===
Thanks to irrigation, agriculture is big. Maize, beans, garlic, potatoes, chile, as well as peaches, pears and grapes are grown.

== Services ==
Rincón de Romos has medical services, gas stations, restaurants, tourist centers, a train station, a bus station, a repair shop, taxis, telephone, mail, and auto services, as well as shopping. It also has its own university and high school.
