= Asientos =

Municipality in Aguascalientes, Mexico

- Municipality
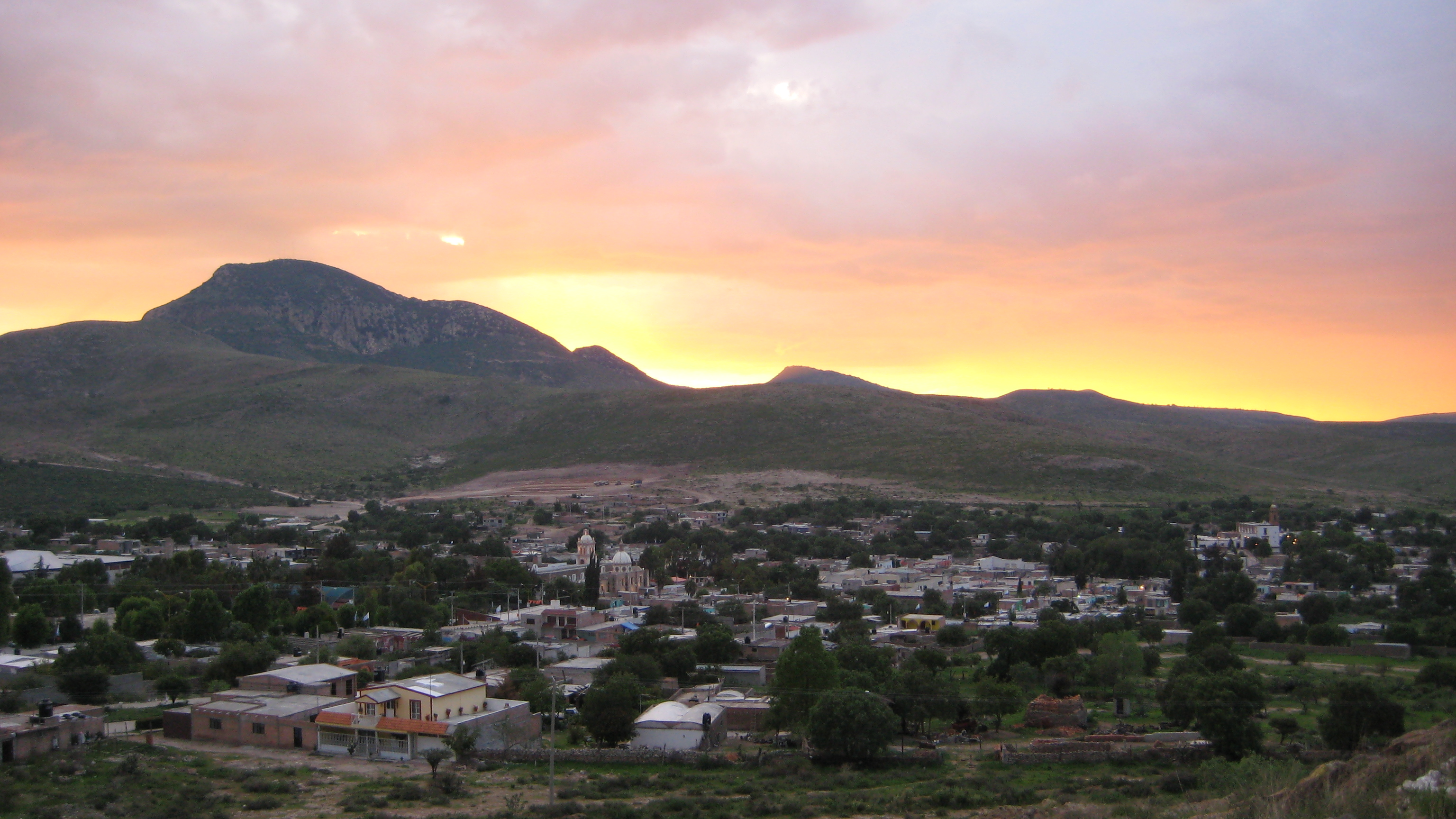

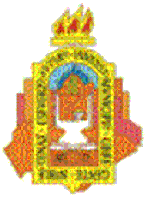
- Coat of arms

- Municipality location in Aguascalientes

- Location in Mexico
- Coordinates: 22°14′N 102°05′W
- Country: Mexico
- State: Aguascalientes

Government
  - Federal electoral district: Aguascalientes's 1st

Area
  - Total: 547.22 km^{2} (211.28 sq mi)

Population (2020)
  - Total: 37,664
  - Density: 68.828/km^{2} (178.26/sq mi)
- Time zone: UTC-06:00 (Central)

Asientos is a municipality in the Mexican state of Aguascalientes. It stands at 22°14′N 102°05′W. The town of Real de Asientos serves as its municipal seat.

Real de Asientos was declared a Pueblo Mágico by the Mexican Secretariat of Tourism (SECTUR) in 2006. As of March 2021 it is one of three Pueblos Mágicos in the state of Aguascalientes.

As of 2010, the municipality (and before the separation of Villa Juárez) had a total population of 45,492.

Other than the town of Real de Asientos, the municipality had 250 localities, the largest of which (with 2010 populations in parentheses) were: Ciénega Grande (3,348), classified as urban, and Guadalupe de Atlas (2,259), Lázaro Cárdenas (1,583), Bimbaletes Aguascalientes (El Álamo) (1,223), Molinos (1,219), Noria del Borrego (Norias) (1,186), and Jarillas (1,041), classified as rural.

== Geography ==
Historical population
Year	Pop.	±%
2010	45,492	—
2015	46,464	+2.1%
2020	51,536	+10.9%

The municipality of Asientos is located in the north-east of the state and has a territorial area of 547.74 kilometres squared which is equivalent to 9.84% of the total area of the state and it has an altitude ranging from 1800 to 2700 metres above sea level.

It borders the municipality of Tepezalá to the west. In the north and east, it borders the state of Zacatecas, specifically the municipalities of Loreto in the northwest and Villa García in the southeast.

=== Climate ===
Climate data for Asientos (1991–2020)
Month	Jan	Feb	Mar	Apr	May	Jun	Jul	Aug	Sep	Oct	Nov	Dec	Year
Record high °C (°F)	30.0 (86.0)	34.0 (93.2)	35.0 (95.0)	39.0 (102.2)	40.0 (104.0)	39.0 (102.2)	37.0 (98.6)	34.0 (93.2)	33.0 (91.4)	34.0 (93.2)	39.0 (102.2)	39.0 (102.2)	40.0 (104.0)
Mean daily maximum °C (°F)	21.8 (71.2)	24.3 (75.7)	26.3 (79.3)	28.0 (82.4)	29.1 (84.4)	28.5 (83.3)	26.9 (80.4)	27.3 (81.1)	26.1 (79.0)	25.5 (77.9)	24.0 (75.2)	22.2 (72.0)	25.8 (78.4)
Daily mean °C (°F)	13.4 (56.1)	15.4 (59.7)	17.4 (63.3)	18.9 (66.0)	20.1 (68.2)	20.3 (68.5)	19.1 (66.4)	19.5 (67.1)	18.5 (65.3)	17.4 (63.3)	15.6 (60.1)	13.7 (56.7)	17.4 (63.3)
Mean daily minimum °C (°F)	4.9 (40.8)	6.6 (43.9)	8.5 (47.3)	9.7 (49.5)	11.2 (52.2)	12.0 (53.6)	11.2 (52.2)	11.7 (53.1)	10.9 (51.6)	9.2 (48.6)	7.3 (45.1)	5.2 (41.4)	9.0 (48.2)
Record low °C (°F)	−7.0 (19.4)	−8.0 (17.6)	−2.0 (28.4)	0.0 (32.0)	3.0 (37.4)	3.0 (37.4)	3.0 (37.4)	3.0 (37.4)	2.0 (35.6)	0.0 (32.0)	−6.0 (21.2)	−8.0 (17.6)	−8.0 (17.6)
Average precipitation mm (inches)	18.8 (0.74)	15.9 (0.63)	5.2 (0.20)	12.1 (0.48)	25.3 (1.00)	77.8 (3.06)	89.3 (3.52)	85.8 (3.38)	56.2 (2.21)	24.4 (0.96)	11.7 (0.46)	7.3 (0.29)	429.8 (16.92)
Average precipitation days (≥ 0.1 mm)	2.3	1.9	0.9	1.8	3.9	8.2	9.4	9.3	7.2	4.1	1.9	1.5	52.4
Source: Servicio Meteorologico Nacional

== Government ==
The government of the municipality consists of the City Council, which is made up of a municipal president, a trustee and a council composed of nine members, five elected by relative majority and four by proportional representation. The city council is elected by universal, direct and secret vote in elections held on the first Sunday of July of the corresponding year.
