= 1st federal electoral district of Aguascalientes =

Federal electoral district of Mexico

Aguascalientes's 1st
- Electoral district of the Chamber of Deputies of Mexico

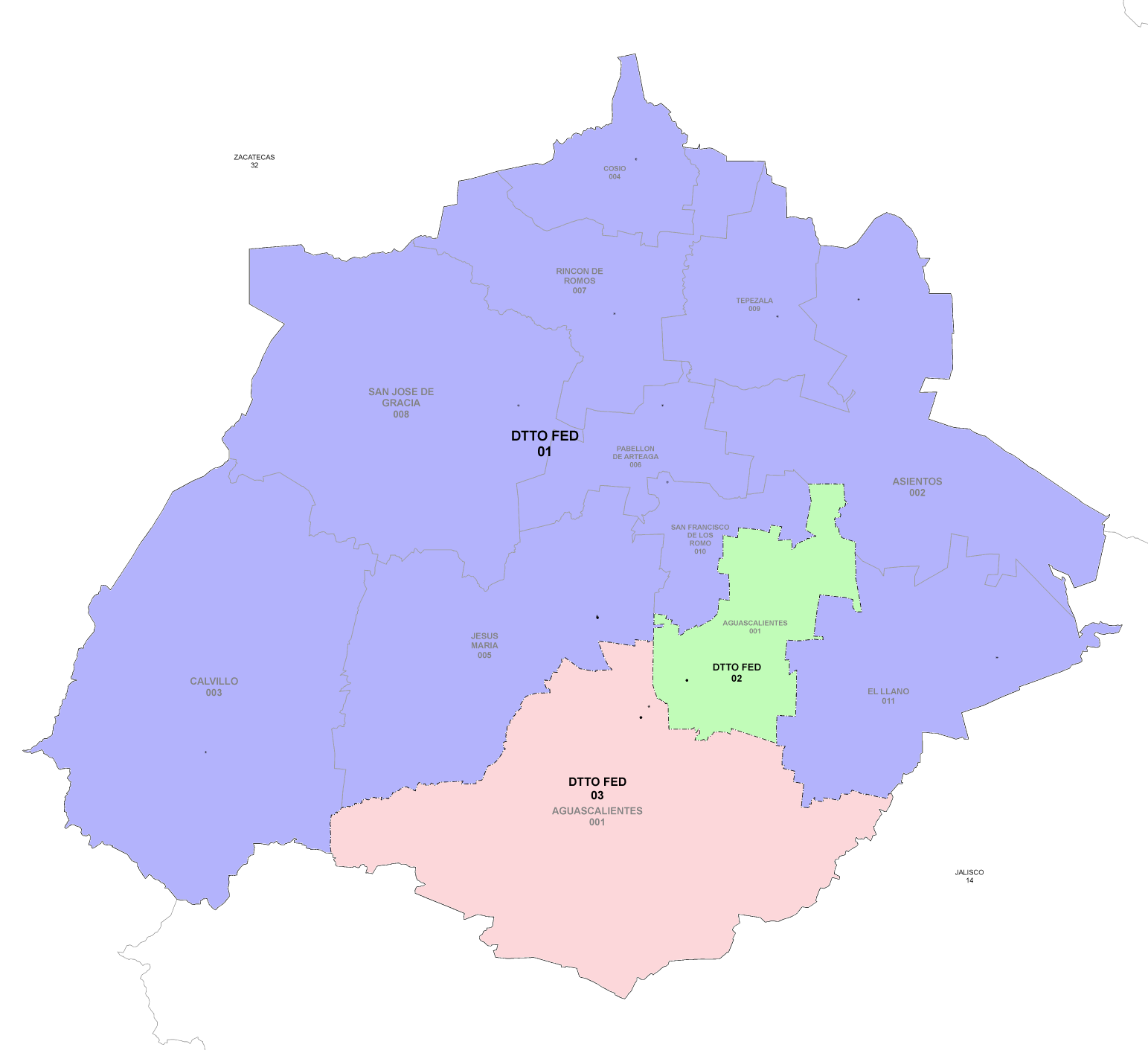
- 1st district

Incumbent
- Member: Humberto Ambriz Delgadillo
- Party: ▌Institutional Revolutionary Party
- Congress: 66th (2024–2027)

District
- State: Aguascalientes
- Head town: Jesús María
- Coordinates: 21°58′N 102°21′W
- Covers: 10 municipalities: Asientos, Calvillo, Cosío, Jesús María, Pabellón de Arteaga, Rincón de Romos, San José de Gracia, Tepezalá, San Francisco de los Romo, El Llano
- PR region: Second
- Precincts: 150
- Population: 482,911 (2020 census)

The 1st federal electoral district of Aguascalientes (Spanish: Distrito electoral federal 01 de Aguascalientes) is one of the 300 electoral districts into which Mexico is divided for elections to the federal Chamber of Deputies and one of three such districts in the state of Aguascalientes.

It elects one deputy to the lower house of Congress for each three-year legislative session by means of the first-past-the-post system. Votes cast in the district also count towards the calculation of proportional representation ("plurinominal") deputies elected from the second region.

The current member for the district, elected in the 2024 general election, is Humberto Ambriz Delgadillo of the Institutional Revolutionary Party (PRI).

== District territory ==
Under the 2023 districting plan adopted by the National Electoral Institute (INE), which is to be used for the 2024, 2027 and 2030 federal elections, the 1st district covers 150 electoral precincts (secciones electorales) across ten of the state's 11 municipalities:

- Asientos, Calvillo, Cosío, Jesús María, Pabellón de Arteaga, Rincón de Romos, San José de Gracia, Tepezalá, San Francisco de los Romo and El Llano. (Note: Excluded from the district is the municipality of Aguascalientes, which is divided between the 2nd and 3rd districts.)

The district's head town (cabecera distrital), where results from individual polling stations are gathered together and tallied, is the city of Jesús María. The district reported a population of 482,911 in the 2020 census.

== Previous districting schemes ==
Evolution of electoral district numbers
	1974	1978	1996	2005	2017	2023
Aguascalientes	2	2	3	3	3	3
Chamber of Deputies	196	300				

2017–2022

In the 2017 scheme, the 1st district covered the same ten municipalities.

2005–2017

Under the 2005 redistricting process, the district was made up of the same ten municipalities.

1996–2005

Aguascalientes gained a congressional seat in 1996. The reconfigured 1st district acquired the composition – the entire state, minus the capital and its municipality – it would have in the later schemes.

1978–1996

The districting scheme in force from 1978 to 1996 was the result of the 1977 electoral reforms, which increased the number of single-member seats in the Chamber of Deputies from 196 to 300. Aguascalientes's seat allocation, however, remained unchanged at two. The 1st district covered the city of Aguascalientes, with its surrounding municipality assigned to the 2nd district.

== Deputies returned to Congress ==
(Mexico) National parties
- Current
- PAN
- PRI
- PT
- PVEM
- MC
- Morena
- PAZ
- Somos
- Defunct or local only
- PLM
- PNR
- PRM
- PNM
- PP
- PPS
- PARM
- PFCRN
- CON
- PANAL
- PSD
- PES
- PES
- PRD

Aguascalientes's 1st district
Election	Deputy	Party	Term	Legislature
1916	Aurelio L. González		1916–1917	Constituent Congress of Querétaro
...
1932	Juan G. Alvarado	National Revolutionary Party (Mexico)	1932–1934	35th Congress
1934	Rafael A. Valdez	National Revolutionary Party (Mexico)	1934–1937	36th Congress
1937	Ramón V. Aldana	National Revolutionary Party (Mexico)	1937–1940	37th Congress
1940	Benjamín Reséndiz	Party of the Mexican Revolution	1940–1943	38th Congress
1943	Macario J. Gómez	Party of the Mexican Revolution	1943–1946	39th Congress
1946	Aquiles Elorduy	National Action Party (Mexico)	1946–1949	40th Congress
1949	Jesús Ávila Vázquez	Institutional Revolutionary Party	1949–1952	41st Congress
1952	Luis T. Díaz Alvarado	Institutional Revolutionary Party	1952–1955	42nd Congress
1955	Edmundo L. Bernal Alonso	Institutional Revolutionary Party	1955–1958	43rd Congress
1958	Heriberto Béjar Jáuregui	Institutional Revolutionary Party	1958–1961	44th Congress
1961	Manuel Trujillo Miranda	Institutional Revolutionary Party	1961–1964	45th Congress
1964	Antonio Femat Esparza	Institutional Revolutionary Party	1964–1967	46th Congress
1967	Francisco Guel Jiménez	Institutional Revolutionary Party	1967–1970	47th Congress
1970	Luciano Arenas Ochoa	Institutional Revolutionary Party	1970–1973	48th Congress
1973	José de Jesús Medellín Muñoz	Institutional Revolutionary Party	1973–1976	49th Congress
1976	Jesús Martínez Gortari	Institutional Revolutionary Party	1976–1979	50th Congress
1979	Roberto Díaz Rodríguez	Institutional Revolutionary Party	1979–1982	51st Congress
1982	Heriberto Vázquez Becerra	Institutional Revolutionary Party	1982–1985	52nd Congress
1985	Alfredo González González	Institutional Revolutionary Party	1985–1988	53rd Congress
1988	Manuel González Díaz de León	Institutional Revolutionary Party	1988–1991	54th Congress
1991	Armando Romero Rosales	Institutional Revolutionary Party	1991–1994	55th Congress
1994	María del Socorro Ramírez Ortega	Institutional Revolutionary Party	1994–1997	56th Congress
1997	Óscar González Rodríguez	Institutional Revolutionary Party	1997–2000	57th Congress
2000	Roque Rodríguez López	National Action Party (Mexico)	2000–2003	58th Congress
2003	Arturo Robles Aguilar	Institutional Revolutionary Party	2003–2006	59th Congress
2006	Pedro Armendáriz García	National Action Party (Mexico)	2006–2009	60th Congress
2009	Antonio Arámbula López	National Action Party (Mexico)	2009–2012	61st Congress
2012	José Pilar Moreno	Institutional Revolutionary Party	2012–2015	62nd Congress
2015	Gerardo Federico Salas Díaz	National Action Party (Mexico)	2015–2018	63rd Congress
2018	Francisco Javier Luevano Nuñez	National Action Party (Mexico)	2018–2021	64th Congress
2021	Noel Mata Atilano	National Action Party (Mexico)	2021–2024	65th Congress
2024	Humberto Ambriz Delgadillo	Institutional Revolutionary Party	2024–2027	66th Congress

== Presidential elections ==
Aguascalientes's 1st district
Election	District won by	Party or coalition	%
2018	Andrés Manuel López Obrador	Juntos Haremos Historia	39.9590
2024 (Note: Despite losing in the 1st and 2nd districts, Aguascalientes was the only state where Xóchitl Gálvez of the Fuerza y Corazón por México coalition won a plurality of the vote.)	Claudia Sheinbaum Pardo	Sigamos Haciendo Historia	46.3591
