= Municipalities of Aguascalientes =

List of municipalities of Mexican state

Map of Mexico with Aguascalientes highlighted

Aguascalientes is a state in North Central Mexico that is divided into twelve municipalities. According to the 2020 INEGI census, Aguascalientes is the sixth least populous state with 1,425,607 inhabitants and the fourth smallest by land area spanning 5,630.27 square kilometres (2,173.86 sq mi).

Municipalities in Aguascalientes are administratively autonomous of the state according to the 115th article of the 1917 Constitution of Mexico. Their legal framework derives from the state Constitution and the 2003 Municipal Law for the State of Aguascalientes. Every three years, citizens elect a municipal president (Spanish: presidente municipal) by a plurality voting system who heads a concurrently elected municipal council (ayuntamiento) responsible for providing all the public services for their constituents. The municipal council consists of a variable number of trustees and councillors (regidores y síndicos). Title 9 of the Municipal Law provides for the establishment of unipersonal auxiliary authorities (autoridades auxiliares) to represent local communities in the municipalities.

Municipalities are responsible for public services (such as water and sewerage), street lighting, public safety, traffic, and the maintenance of public parks, gardens and cemeteries. They may also assist the state and federal governments in education, emergency fire and medical services, environmental protection and maintenance of monuments and historical landmarks. Since 1984, they have had the power to collect property taxes and user fees, although more funds are obtained from the state and federal governments than from their own income.

The largest municipality by population is the state capital Aguascalientes, with 948,990 residents or approximately 66.6% of the state population. The smallest municipality by population is San José de Gracia with 9,552 residents. The largest municipality by land area is also Aguascalientes which spans 1,181.24 km^{2} (456.08 sq mi), and the smallest is Cosío which spans 130.07 km^{2} (50.22 sq mi). The first municipality to incorporate was Asientos on January 1, 1797, and the newest municipality is Villa Juárez, which incorporated August 28, 2026.

== Municipalities ==
Largest municipalities in Aguascalientes by population

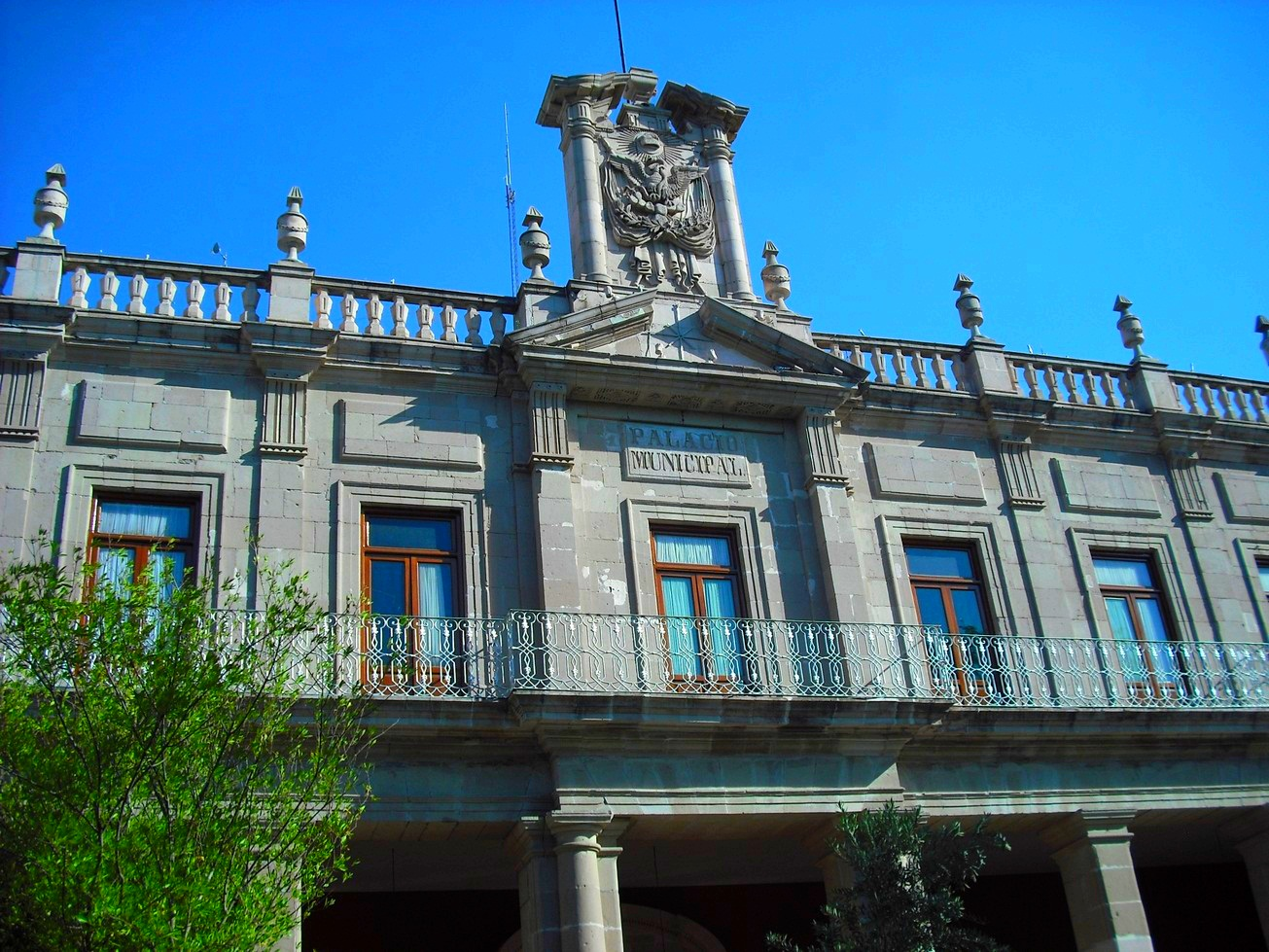
Aguascalientes is the capital of the state and largest municipality by population.

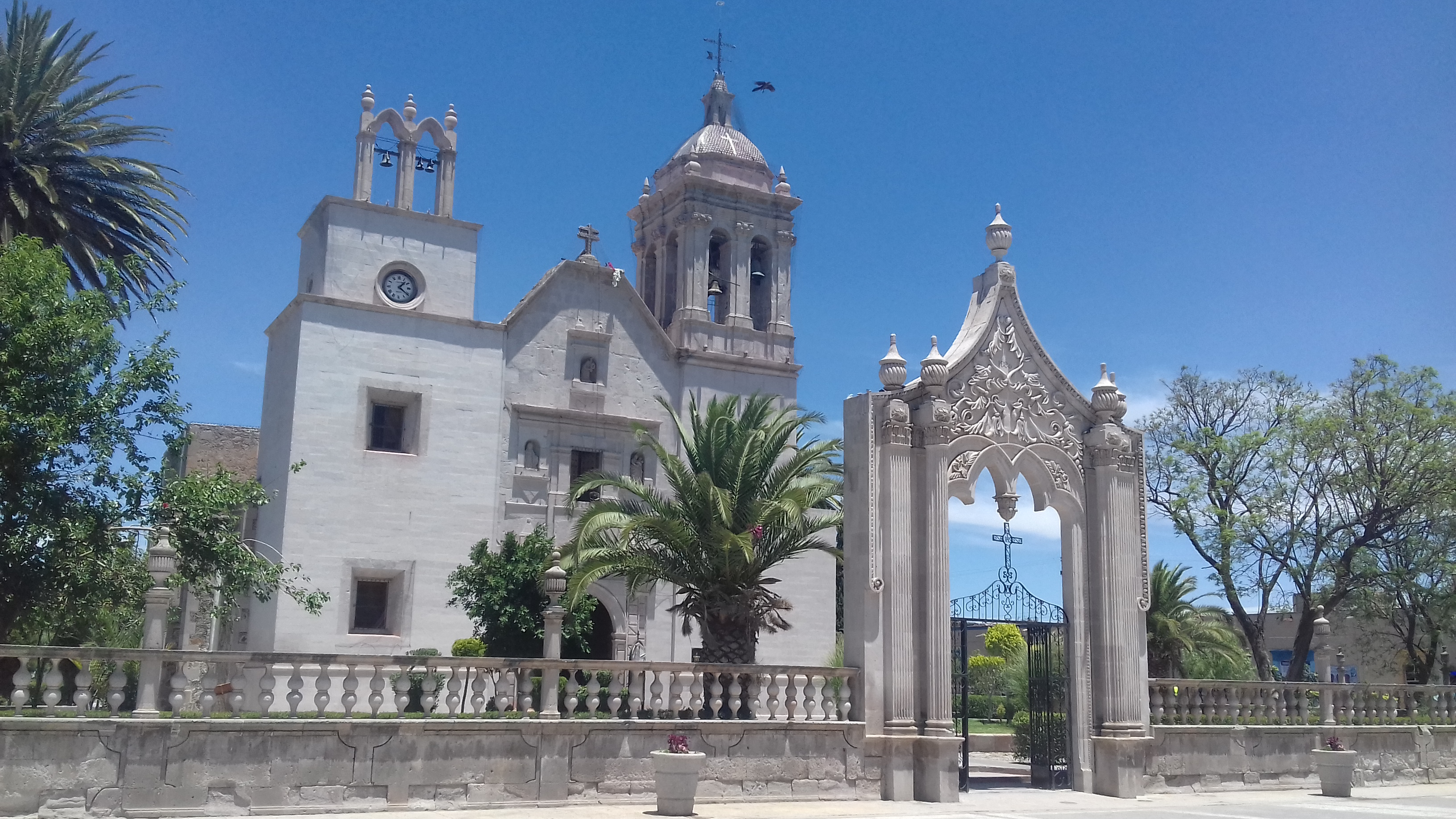
Jesús María is the second largest municipality by population.

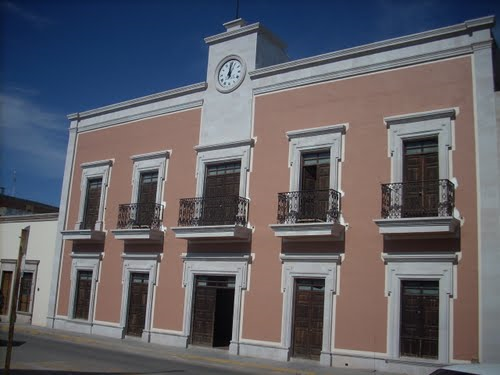
Calvillo is the fourth largest municipality by population.

† State capital

Municipalities of Aguascalientes
Name	Municipal seat	Population (2020)	Population (2010)	Change	Land area		Population density (2020)	Incorporation date
Name	Municipal seat	Population (2020)	Population (2010)	Change	km^{2}	sq mi	Population density (2020)	Incorporation date
Aguascalientes†	Aguascalientes	948,990	797,010	+19.1%	1,181.24	456.08	803.4/km^{2} (2,080.8/sq mi)	January 17, 1825
Asientos	Asientos	51,536	45,492	+13.3%	549.15	212.03	93.8/km^{2} (243.1/sq mi)	January 1, 1797
Calvillo	Calvillo	58,250	54,136	+7.6%	935.18	361.07	62.3/km^{2} (161.3/sq mi)	October 29, 1833
Cosío	Cosío	17,000	15,042	+13.0%	130.07	50.22	130.7/km^{2} (338.5/sq mi)	December 28, 1857
El Llano	Palo Alto	20,853	18,828	+10.8%	511.52	197.50	40.8/km^{2} (105.6/sq mi)	March 1, 1992
Jesús María	Jesús María	129,929	99,590	+30.5%	506.45	195.54	256.5/km^{2} (664.5/sq mi)	October 29, 1833
Pabellón de Arteaga	Pabellón de Arteaga	47,646	41,862	+13.8%	198.44	76.62	240.1/km^{2} (621.9/sq mi)	May 9, 1965
Rincón de Romos	Rincón de Romos	57,369	49,156	+16.7%	377.17	145.63	152.1/km^{2} (393.9/sq mi)	October 29, 1833
San Francisco de los Romo	San Francisco de los Romo	61,997	35,769	+73.3%	139.45	53.84	444.6/km^{2} (1,151.4/sq mi)	March 1, 1992
San José de Gracia	San José de Gracia	9,552	8,443	+13.1%	868.93	335.50	11.0/km^{2} (28.5/sq mi)	October 29, 1833
Tepezalá	Tepezalá	22,485	19,668	+14.3%	232.66	89.83	96.6/km^{2} (250.3/sq mi)	December 28, 1857
Villa Juárez (Note: Villa Juárez was created from the municipality of Asientos on August 18, 2026, and thus is not represented in the 2020 or 2010 censuses.)	Villa Juárez							August 28, 2026
Aguascalientes	—	1,425,607	1,184,996	+20.3%	5,630.27	2,173.86	253.2/km^{2} (655.8/sq mi)	—
Mexico	—	126,014,024	112,336,538	+12.2%	1,972,550	761,606	63.9/km^{2} (165.5/sq mi)	—
