= Aguascalientes =

State of Mexico

- State
- Free and Sovereign State of Aguascalientes; Estado Libre y Soberano de Aguascalientes (Spanish)
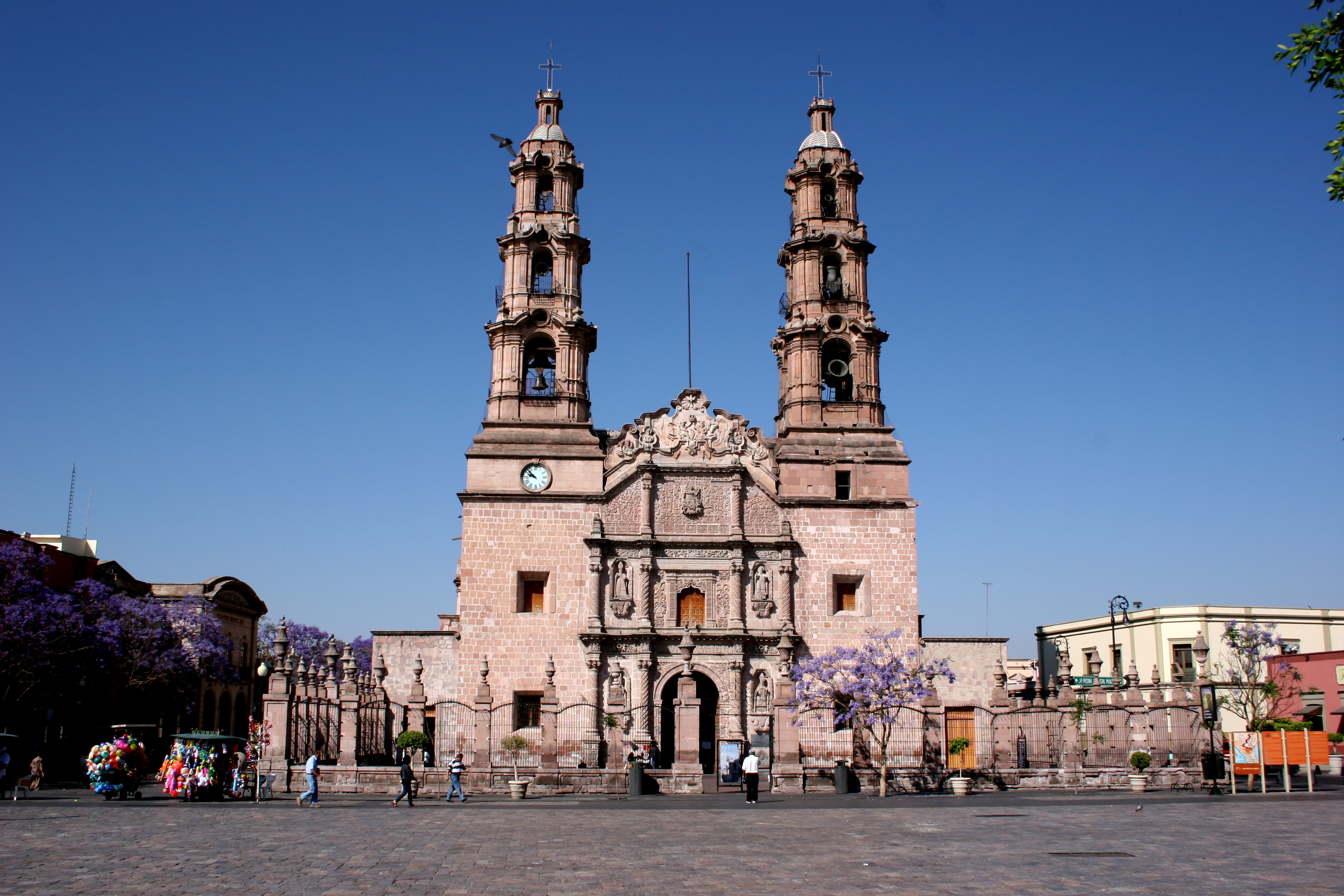
- The Aguascalientes Cathedral

- Coat of arms
- Motto: Bona Terra, Bona Gens, Aqua Clara, Clarum Caelum ("Good Earth, Good People, Clear Water, Clear Sky")
- Anthem: Himno de Aguascalientes "Anthem of Aguascalientes"
- State of Aguascalientes within Mexico
- Coordinates: 22°03′N 102°18′W
- Country: Mexico
- Capital and largest city: Aguascalientes
- Municipalities: 11
- Admission: February 5, 1857
- Order: 24th

Government
  - Governor: María Teresa Jiménez Esquivel (PAN)
  - Senators: Martha Márquez Alvarado (PT); Juan Antonio Martín del Campo (PAN); Daniel Gutiérrez Castorena (Morena)
  - Deputies: Federal deputies: Noel Mata Atilano (PAN) (1st); Mónica Becerra Moreno (PAN) (2nd); Paulo Gonzalo Martínez López (PAN) (3rd)

Area
  - Total: 5,617.80 km^{2} (2,169.04 sq mi)
- Ranked 29th
- Highest elevation: 3,050 m (10,010 ft)

Population (2020)
  - Total: 1,425,607
  - Rank: 27th
  - Density: 253.766/km^{2} (657.251/sq mi)
  - Rank: 4th
- Demonym: Hidrocálido/a

GDP (2022)
  - Total: MXN 356 billion (US$17.7 billion)
  - Per capita: US$12,028
- Time zone: UTC−06:00 (Zona Centro)
- Postal code: 20
- Area code: Area codes: • 449; • 465; • 495
- ISO 3166 code: MX-AGU
- HDI: ▲0.825 very high Ranked 9th of 32
- Website: Official website

Aguascalientes, (Note: Spanish pronunciation: [ˌaɣwaskaˈljentes]; lit. 'Hot Waters') officially the Free and Sovereign State of Aguascalientes, (Note: Spanish: Estado Libre y Soberano de Aguascalientes) is one of the 32 states which comprise the federated entities of Mexico. At 22°N and with an average altitude of 1,950 m (6,400 ft) above sea level it is predominantly of semi-arid climate (Bhs and Bhk). The state is located in the northern part of the Bajío region, which is in the north-central part of the country, bordered by Zacatecas to the north, east and west, and by Jalisco to the south.

As of the 2020 census, Aguascalientes has a population of 1,425,607 inhabitants, most of whom live in its capital city, also named Aguascalientes. Its name means "hot waters" and originated from the abundance of hot springs originally found in the area. The demonym for the state's inhabitants is hidrocálido or aguascalentense.

Aguascalientes is one of the smallest states of Mexico, both by population or land, being the 27th most populated state and the 29th biggest state by area; nonetheless, it is the fourth state by population density, and its economic development in recent years have located it as the seventh state by Human Development Index and the eighth with highest GDP per capita.

Aguascalientes was historically known for its former railroad and textile industry, as well as wine making, an industry that remains today. During the 2010s Aguascalientes became the fastest-growing state in the country for the whole decade. Aguascalientes is also well known for its San Marcos Fair (Feria Nacional de San Marcos), the largest fair in Mexico and one of the largest in Latin America.

== History ==
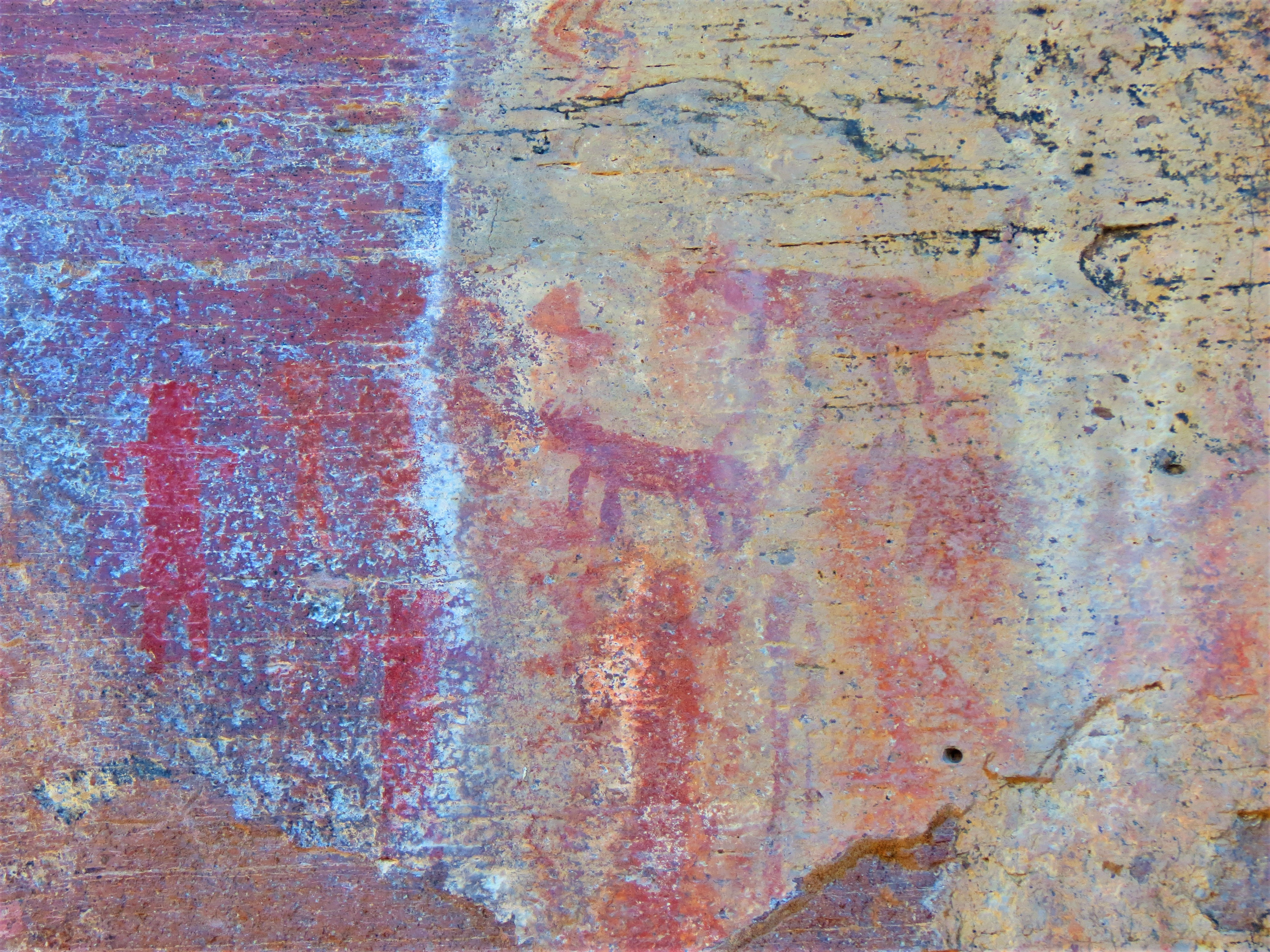
Rock art at the El Ocote archeological site.

Pre-Columbian era arrowheads, potshards, and rock paintings in the caverns of the Sierra del Laurel and near the present village of Las Negritas testify to the presence of humans in this territory for more than 20,000 years. Later in the colonial times, Pedro Almíndez Chirino was the first Spaniard who entered the territory, perhaps by the end of 1530 or the beginning of 1531, following the instructions given by Nuño de Guzmán.

Before the arrival of the Spaniards, the territory of what is now the State of Aguascalientes was inhabited by Chichimecas, specifically the Guachichil, who made the territory difficult to access. In fact, the total occupation of the lands of El Bajío was a task that would take about two centuries. With respect to this, Viceroy Luís de Velasco offered municipal benefits to those who established settlements to confront the Chichimeca. And for his part, Viceroy Gastón de Peralta decided to confront them directly, which did not end with good results.

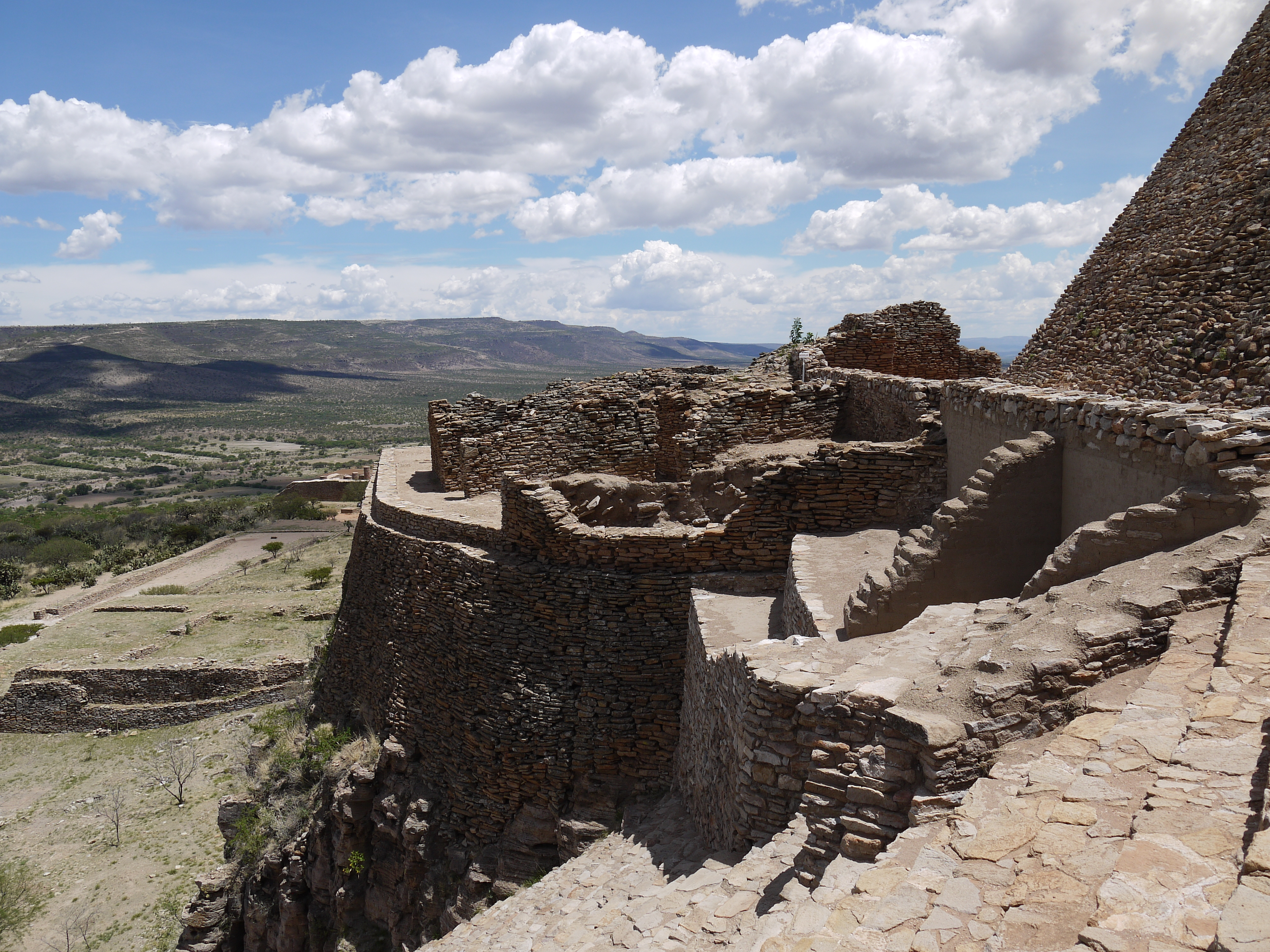
Prehispanic city of La Quemada, Zacatecas, near Aguascalientes.

In order to establish their presence in the vicinity, the conquistadors built several forts or presidios. This was a system devised by Martín Enríquez de Almanza following the strategy that had been developing in Spain throughout the Reconquista period. Therefore, in order to protect the Camino de la Plata, which stretched between Zacatecas and Mexico City, three presidios [garrisoned fortifications] founded by the Indian fighter Juan Domínguez, were to be created, which were: the presidio at Las Bocas, later called Las Bocas de Gallardo, situated on the border of Aguascalientes, in what was the jurisdiction of the mayor of Teocaltiche, presently the border of Aguascalientes and Zacatecas; the presidio at Palmillas, which was located near what is now Tepezalá; and the Ciénega Grande presidio, established around 1570. The latter was located on what are now Moctezuma and Victoria Streets, although some historians place it on the Calle 5 de Mayo (once the Camino Real) at Moctezuma, just in front of the Plaza de Armas. This was a fortress whose purpose was the protection of the Valle de los Romero and the road to Zacatecas, entering this way to secure the passage of convoys loaded with silver and other metals.

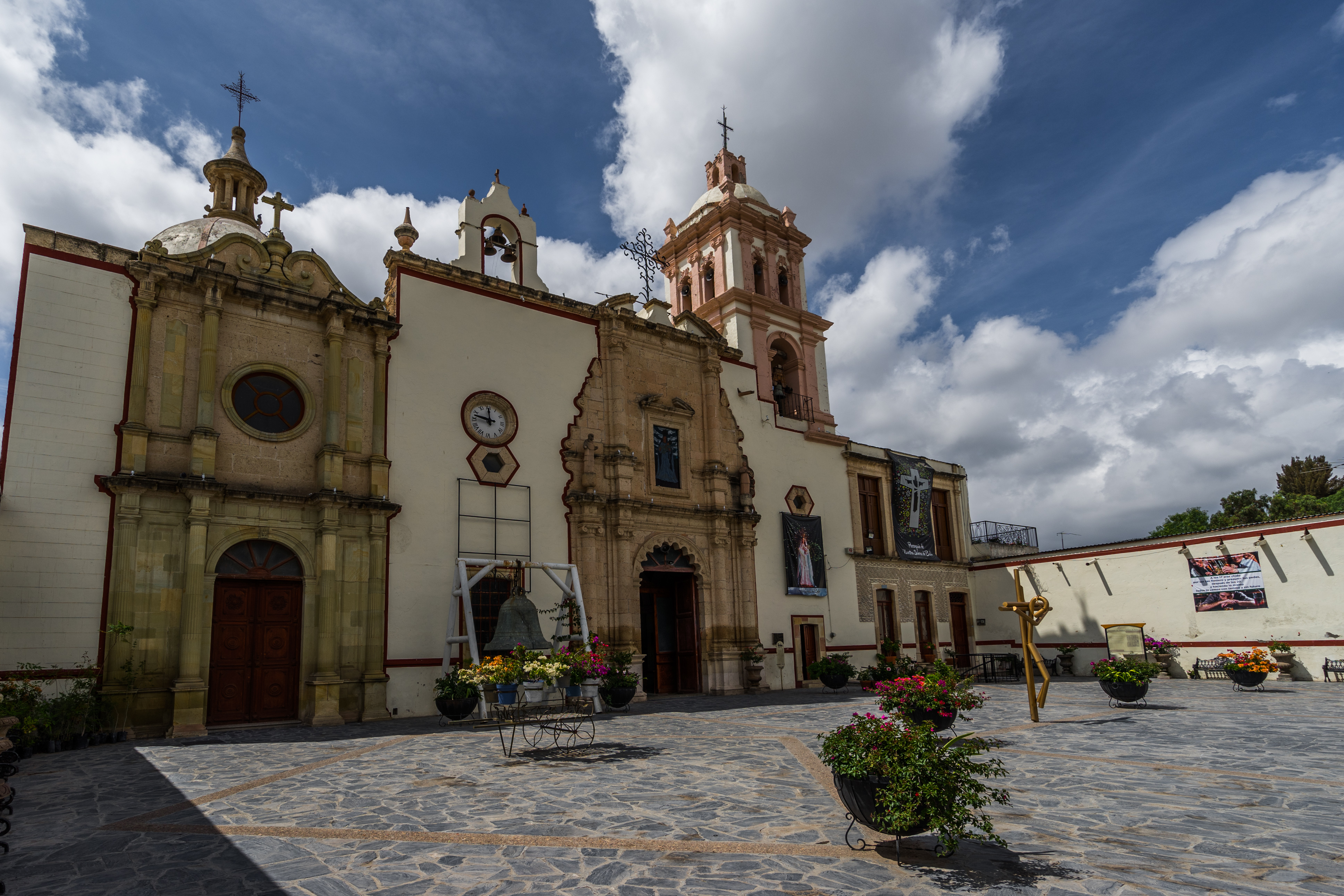
Pueblo mágico of Real de Asientos, founded as a mining town in northern Aguascalientes by conquistador Diego de Ibarra in 1548.

The founding of Aguascalientes as a town came from the order that King Felipe II gave the judge of the court of Nueva Galicia, Don Gerónimo de Orozco, in which he stated that he should look for a rich man to settle in the territory with the purpose of expelling the Chichimecas and of assuring safe passage. Gerónimo de Orozco, following that order, looked for someone who would accept the king's order and found a man named Juan de Montoro in the city of Santa María de los Lagos. He accepted the assignment and, accompanied by eleven other people, headed to the territory and thus founded the town of Aguas Calientes on October 22, 1575. It has been noted that it was called San Marcos originally, changing its name on August 18, 1611, to the Villa of Our Lady of the Assumption of Aguas Calientes. And finally, from June 2, 1875, it was called the Villa of Our Lady of the Assumption of Aguas Calientes; later changing to the city of Aguascalientes, which remains its name today.

In the act of its establishment, the Villa de San Marcos (Aguascalientes) was awarded the highest mayoral jurisdiction under the Kingdom of New Galicia. As of December 4, 1786, on the occasion of the issuance of the "Ordinance of Mayors", it became a quartermaster sub-delegation.

On April 24, 1789, by order of the Superior Board of Royal Property, the sub-delegation of Aguascalientes became a dependency of Zacatecas.

In the Mexican War of Independence, men such as Valentin Gómez Farías, Rafael Iriarte, Rafael Vázquez, and Pedro Parga led some of the first revolutionary activities in the territory which is today the state of Aguascalientes.

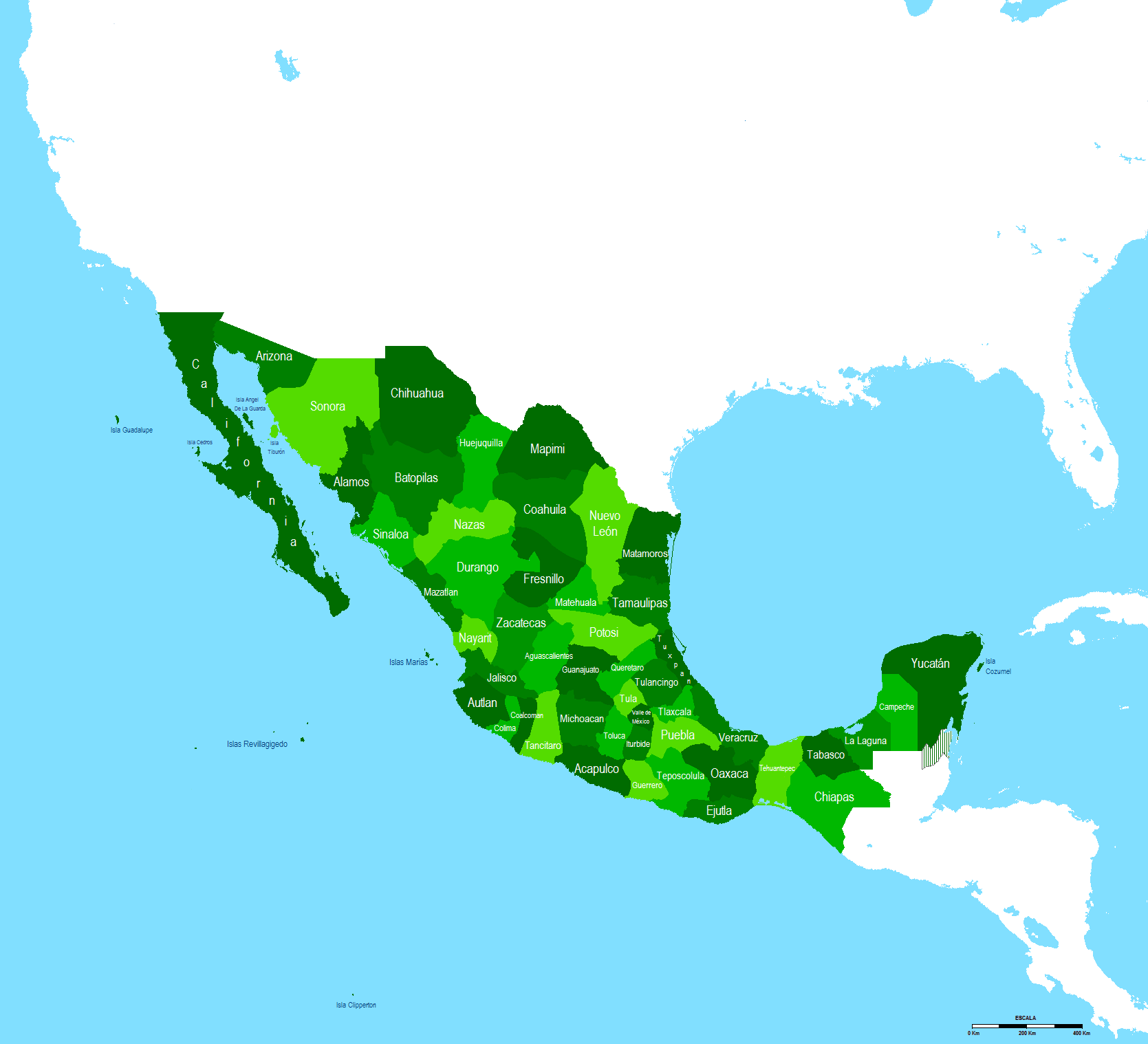
Aguascalientes at its maximum territorial extent in 1865, under the government of Maximilian I of Habsburg. The territory included what is known as Los Altos de Jalisco.

Confusion has arisen regarding the exact date when Aguascalientes formally separated from the territory of Zacatecas. By virtue of having, de facto, defeated the liberal government of Zacatecas by rising against the central government, president Antonio López de Santa Anna passed through Aguascalientes, where he was well received by the people who had wanted to separate from Zacatecas for some time. Taking advantage of the independent souls of the Aguascalentenses, and by way of punishing Zacatecas for supporting the Revolution against them, by Federal Decree of General López de Santa Anna dated May 23, 1835, in the third article; ordered that Aguascalientes to be separated from Zacatecas territory, without granting the territory any specific category, reinstating the appointment of the political boss, Pedro Garcia Rojas. With respect to this, it must be mentioned that said order was not made official as it did not meet the legal requirements to take effect, since it was necessary that two thirds of each house, both Senators and Representatives, approved the order; furthermore it would be required that two thirds of the legislatures of the states also approved it. The second requirement not being completed, the constitutional congress convened again to develop the centralized constitution that would be known later as the Seven Laws. The constitution did not acknowledge Aguascalientes in the rank of department, but it saw fit to eliminate the states, together with the federal regime, replacing the states with departments, and because of this it continued to belong to Zacatecas. What can be said, since in the local constitution of Zacatecas of 1825, Aguascalientes was contemplated as a member of said state.

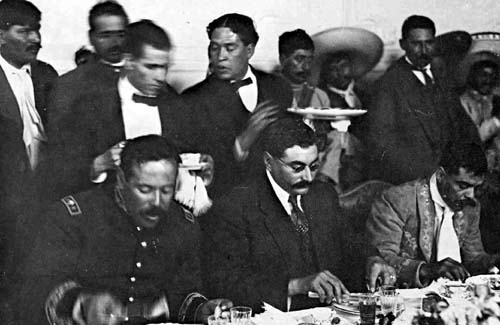
Pancho Villa, Eulalio Gutiérrez y Emiliano Zapata after the Revolutionary Convention of Aguascalientes, 1914.

It was general José Mariano Salas who, on August 5, 1846, announced the reestablishment of federalism, convening a constitutional congress that declared current the constitution of 1824, but still didn't consider Aguascalientes as a state. Subsequently, on May 18, 1847, amendments were approved to the Constitution of 1824, but neither granted to Aguascalientes the status of a state. That brought about a war between Aguascalientes and Zacatecas, and as a consequence Zacatecas would strengthen the partitions, now municipalities, of Cavillo and Rincón de Romos. In July 1848, Aguascalientes accepted the peaceful annexation to Zacatecas; but continued making efforts to separate through Miguel García Rojas. It was not until December 10, 1853, that López de Santa Anna, using his extraordinary powers, issued a decree declaring Aguascalientes a department, based on the decrees of December 30, 1836, and June 30, 1838, without ever referring to the one from March 23, 1835. Finally, in the project that would be the Constitution of 1857, that was presented on June 16, 1856, Aguascalientes was included as a state in Article 43; it was passed unanimously by the 79 deputies present, ensuring the establishment of the state of Aguascalientes on December 10, 1856. On September 16, 1857, on the strength of said constitution, Lic. Jesús Terán Peredo reclaimed his post as constitutional governor of the state.

In the independent state, men such as Jesús R. Macías, Manuel Rangel, Augustín Orona, José María Arellano and many others distinguished themselves in the War of Reform.

Silvestre Dorador, Román Morales, Pedro Vital, Alfonso Guerrero Aguilera and Alberto Fuentes Dávila were forerunners of the Revolution. The explosion of the Maderist movement embraced the cause in the company of some other compatriots, and the rebel action of the town and the region stayed formalized.

== Geography ==
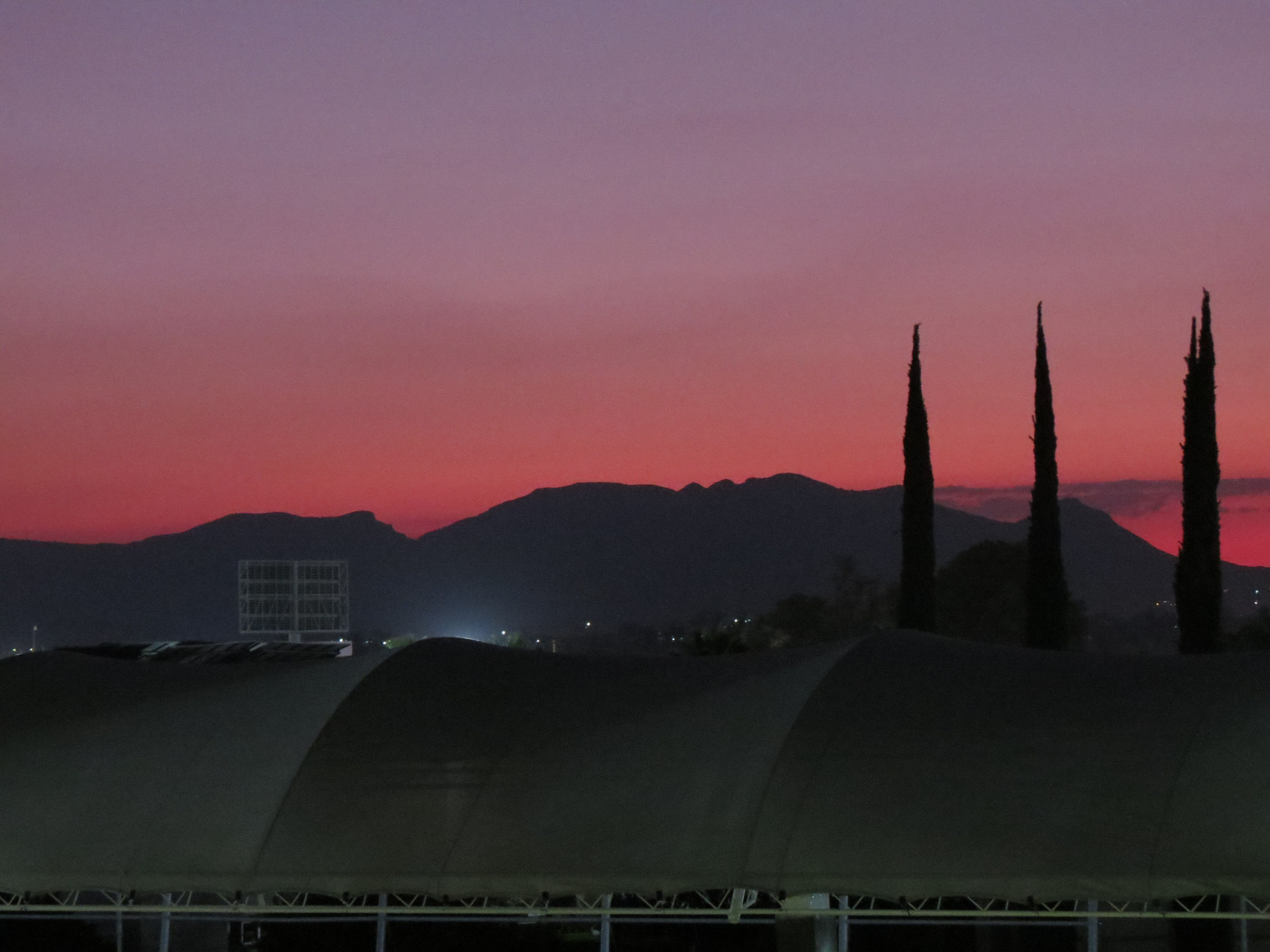
Local mountain range as seen from Aguascalientes.

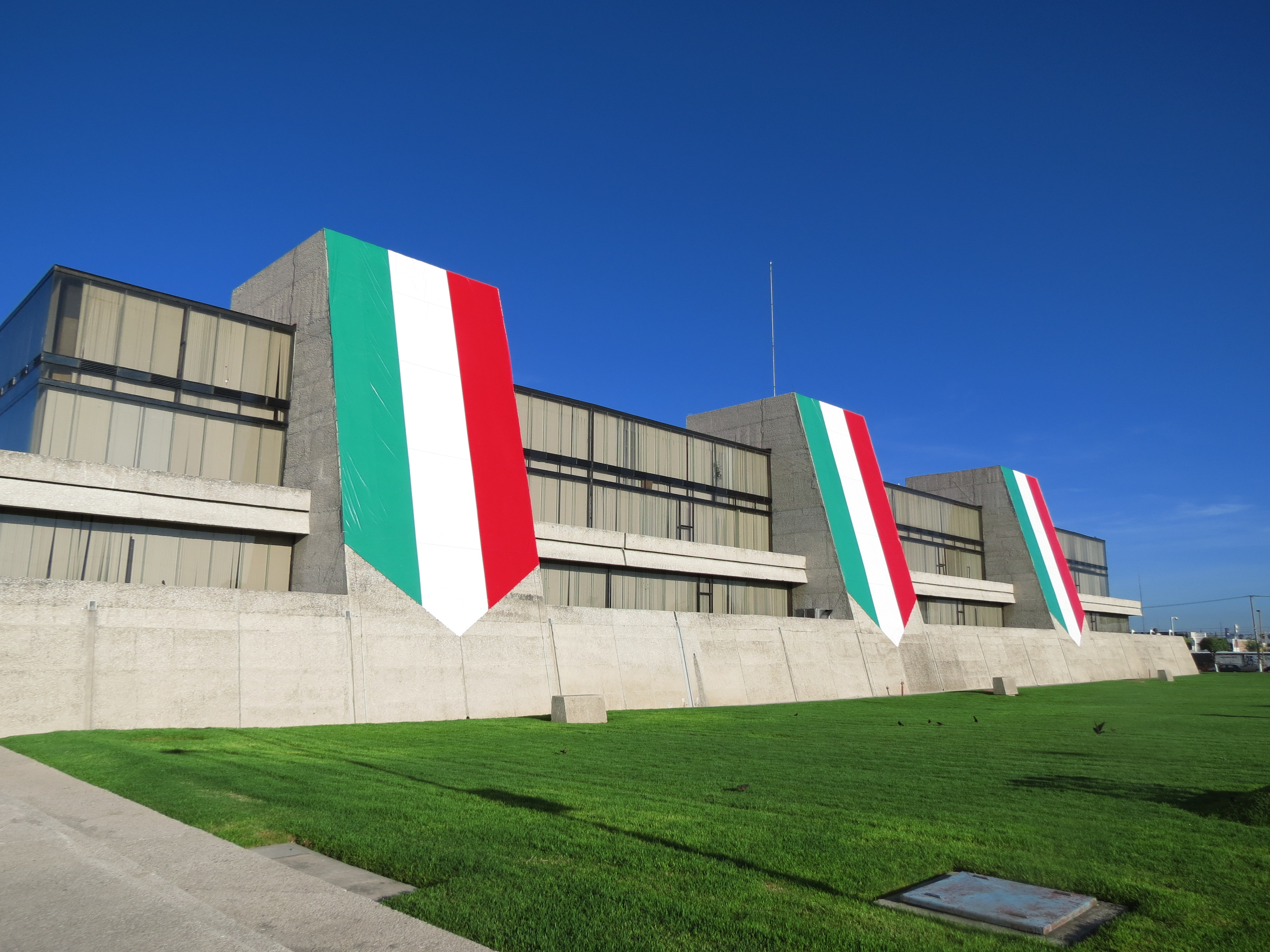
Headquarters of INEGI, the National Institute for Statistics and Geography.

The state is located about 480 km (300 mi) from Mexico City in the macroregion of El Bajío, specifically the Bajío Occidental (western Bajío).

It covers 5,471 km^{2} (2,112 sq mi), or 0.3% of the area of the country, and has a little more than one million inhabitants. Most of its inhabitants live in the densely populated metropolitan area of its capital city.

The state as it is now was created on October 27, 1857, when it was separated from Zacatecas after the tale says that the wife of the governor of the state promised to give a kiss to the President of the time, in exchange for the separation of Aguascalientes from Zacatecas, which explains the shape of a kiss the state has. It bears the name Aguascalientes taken from its largest city and capital also called Aguascalientes.

=== Climate ===
The state mostly has a semi-arid climate, with an exception in the northwestern part of the state with the Sierra Fría mountain range having a temperate highland climate. It also brings large amounts of rain that eventually flows into one of the states reservoir. Mean annual temperature of the state is around 17 to 18 °C (62.6 to 64.4 °F) in which May and June are the hottest months with mean temperatures between 22 and 23 °C (71.6 and 73.4 °F). In these months, temperatures can exceed 30 °C (86.0 °F). January is the coldest month, averaging 13 to 14 °C (55.4 to 57.2 °F) with temperatures dropping down to 4 °C (39.2 °F). Frosts frequently occur from November to February. Mean rainfall is low, averaging 526 mm (20.7 in) and is mostly concentrated in summer with winters being dry.

== Demographics ==
Largest cities or towns in Aguascalientes Source:
Rank		Municipality	Pop.
1	Aguascalientes	Aguascalientes	934,424
2	Jesús María	Jesús María	129,929
3	Pabellón de Arteaga	Pabellón de Arteaga	32,035
4	Rincón de Romos	Rincón de Romos	31,963
5	Calvillo	Calvillo	21,049
6	San Francisco de los Romo	San Francisco de los Romo	18,709
7	Jesús Gómez Portugal	Jesús María	12,646
8	Fraccionamiento La Ribera	San Francisco de los Romo	12,162
9	Pocitos	Aguascalientes	8,494
10	Ojocalientes	Calvillo	7,318

Historical population
Year	Pop.	±%
1895	104,693	—
1900	102,416	−2.2%
1910	120,511	+17.7%
1921	107,581	−10.7%
1930	132,900	+23.5%
1940	161,693	+21.7%
1950	226,965	+40.4%
1960	243,363	+7.2%
1970	338,142	+38.9%
1980	519,439	+53.6%
1990	719,659	+38.5%
1995	862,720	+19.9%
2000	944,285	+9.5%
2005	1,065,416	+12.8%
2010	1,184,996	+11.2%
2015	1,312,544	+10.8%

Religion in Aguascalientes (2010 census)
Roman Catholicism	93.0%
Other Christian	4.4%
Other Religion	0.0%
No religion	1.8%
Unspecified	0.8%

== Government and politics ==
=== Government ===
Aguascalientes is subdivided into 11 municipios ("municipalities").

INEGI code	Municipality	Municipal Seat	Area (km^{2})	Population (2020)
001	Aguascalientes	Aguascalientes	1178.85	948,990
002	Asientos	Asientos	547.22	51,536
003	Calvillo	Calvillo	932.62	58,250
004	Cosío	Cosío	129.21	17,000
005	Jesús María	Jesús María	506.32	129,929
006	Pabellón de Arteaga	Pabellón de Arteaga	199.72	47,646
007	Rincón de Romos	Rincón de Romos	376.77	57,369
008	San José de Gracia	San José de Gracia	866.08	9,552
009	Tepezalá	Tepezalá	231.70	22,485
010	El Llano	Palo Alto	509.77	20,853
011	San Francisco de los Romo	San Francisco de los Romo	139.54	61,997

== Economy and industry ==
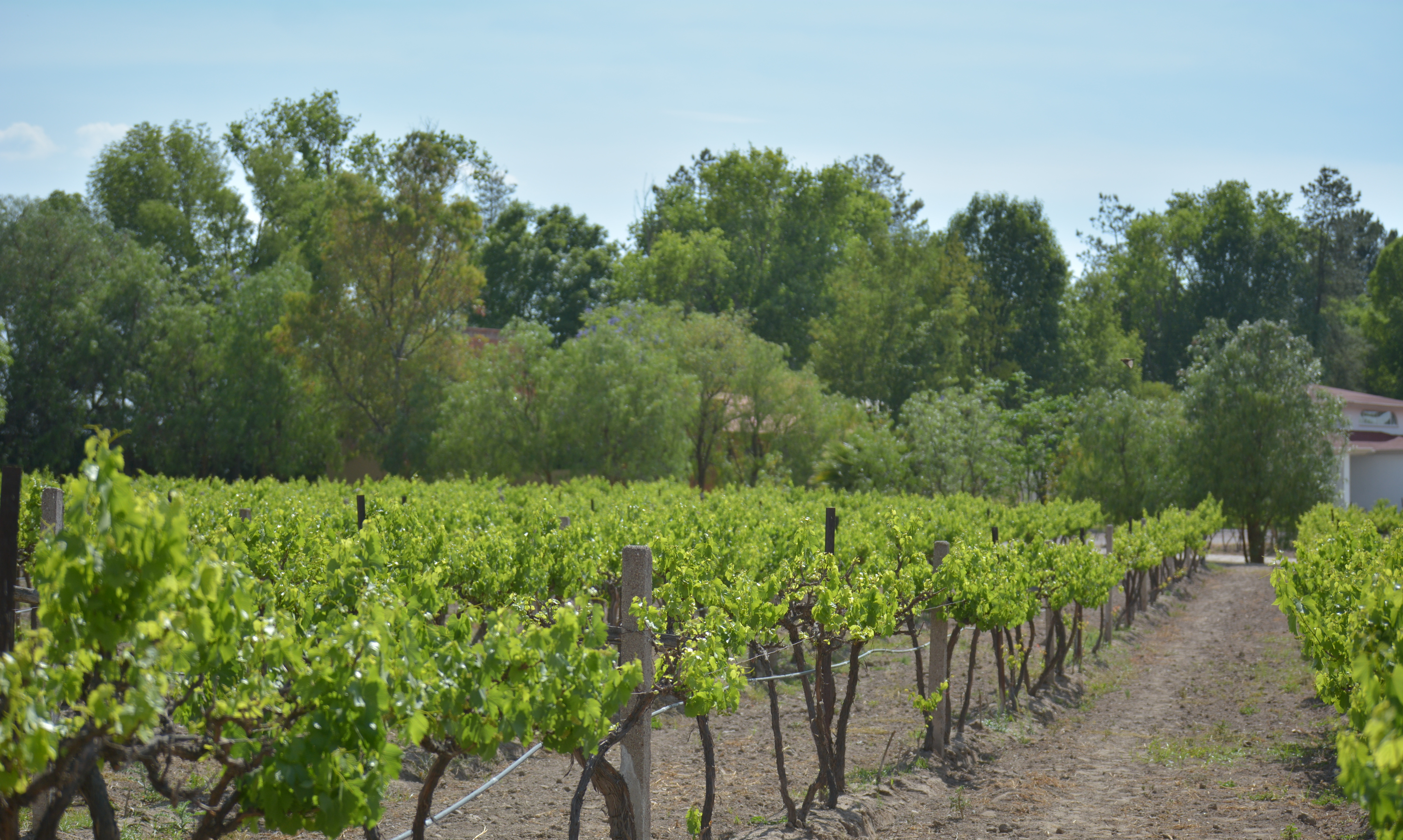
Vineyards in Aguascalientes.

This state originated around the times of colonial Spanish influence. It is located in the middle of the country and is now beginning to make a name for itself as an industrial power within Mexico. The state was once a major silver miner and a major source of railroad transportation, the latter due to its strategic location, midway between the three most populous areas, namely Mexico City, Guadalajara, and Monterrey.

Today, Mexico's fast growing car industry is especially important in this state. There are two Nissan factories in Aguascalientes which together produce more than half a million cars per year. Infiniti may build a plant to make vehicles like the QX30.

In the rural area, Aguascalientes was once the largest national producer of grapes and wines. This tradition ceased gradually due to the Spanish Royalty's wishes that grape and wine production be limited to the mother country. Thanks to the influx of immigrants into Mexico, the wineries and vineyards remain and flourish. Guavas are also produced in the state, specifically in the municipality of Calvillo. This county is one of the richest counties in Aguascalientes.

There are several projects for economic development such as: the Financial District Río San Pedro, a monorail, a suburban train, the construction of the newest and most modern WTC in Mexico, over four shopping malls, two theme parks, two Executive Hotels and one whose qualification is five stars, eight bridges for the next five years, a Financial District around the Airport, A Texas Instruments Assembly-Test Plant, A Nissan Assembly plant, a Toyota assembly plant and several others projects place Aguascalientes as the third most competitive state in Mexico with more than US$12,000,000 in foreign direct investment per year (around 8 percent of Mexico's FDI) even though its population is just about 1.03 percent of the country.

However, recently it has also benefited from heavier tourism, since the capital city has gained prestige and status as a national destination for its colonial beauty and cleanliness. In addition, the haciendas and baths around the state have historic and recreational importance.

== Tourism ==
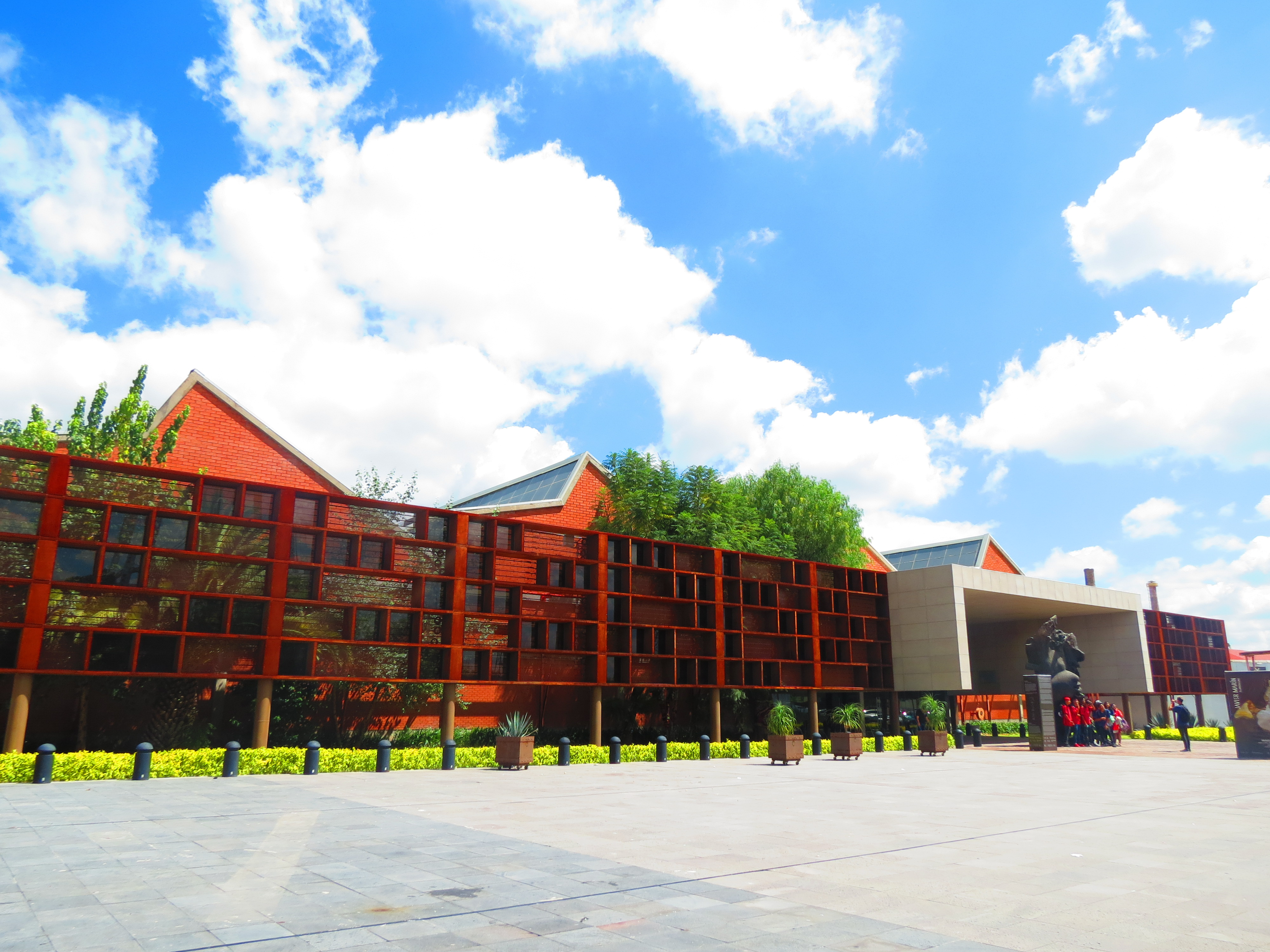
The Museo Espacio of the MECA (Macroespacio para la Cultura y las Artes), housed in a former railway workshop. The 86 hectare MECA complex is composed of museums, a library, auditorium, former industrial buildings and sports facilities.

Although this state is not often billed as a tourist center, international visitors, as well as citizens from all over Mexico, are attracted to San Marcos Fair, which is considered the national fair of Mexico and contributes much to Mexico's economy.

Recently, its capital city has gained the reputation as a great destination for its colonial architecture visible in the colonial center, as well as the modernity and dynamism in the outskirts.

The city is home to Lic. Jesús Terán Peredo International Airport, where 9 flights per day depart to Mexico City, Tijuana, Dallas/Fort Worth and Houston.

The city also hosts many conventions every year. It benefits from its excellent central location. The city is also famed for its environment of relaxation, and for its safety and cleanliness, as it is often described by people when traveling to this part of the country for conventions or tourism.

Most tourists go to the capital. A few tourists explore the former mining towns in the north of the state (in the municipalities of Asientos and Tepezalá), which are now almost ghost cities. The haciendas, hot springs, and baths scattered around the state are also of historical and recreational relevance.

The municipality of Calvillo has a humid subtropical climate, The largest producer of guavas in Mexico, it attracts some fans of watersports to its reservoirs.

Dance performance (Ferial) at the National Fair of San Marcos.

The state has a Natural Protected Reserve in the higher mountains called Sierra Fría. Located at a height of 2,500 to 3,000 m (8,202 to 9,843 ft) above sea level, it comprises oak and pine forests. Its attractions include observing exuberant landscape and wide ravines, in which, there are pumas, lynxes, boar, white-tailed deer, wild turkey, raccoons and many other animals. There are steep-sided cycle paths, camping and picnic areas as well as several hunting clubs. It is the mountain climate and fauna that attracts locals for camping activities. In winter, the temperature sometimes falls to −4.44 °C (24.01 °F) when the weather is poor. Usually, Sierra Fría is the only part of the state that gets snow during winter.

The city of Aguascalientes is called "el corazón" which means "the heart" of Mexico because it lies in the middle of the country. This city is often considered, by its locals, to be one of the safest and cleanest in Mexico. Also, the city of Aguascalientes is known as "the land of the good people".

== Sports ==
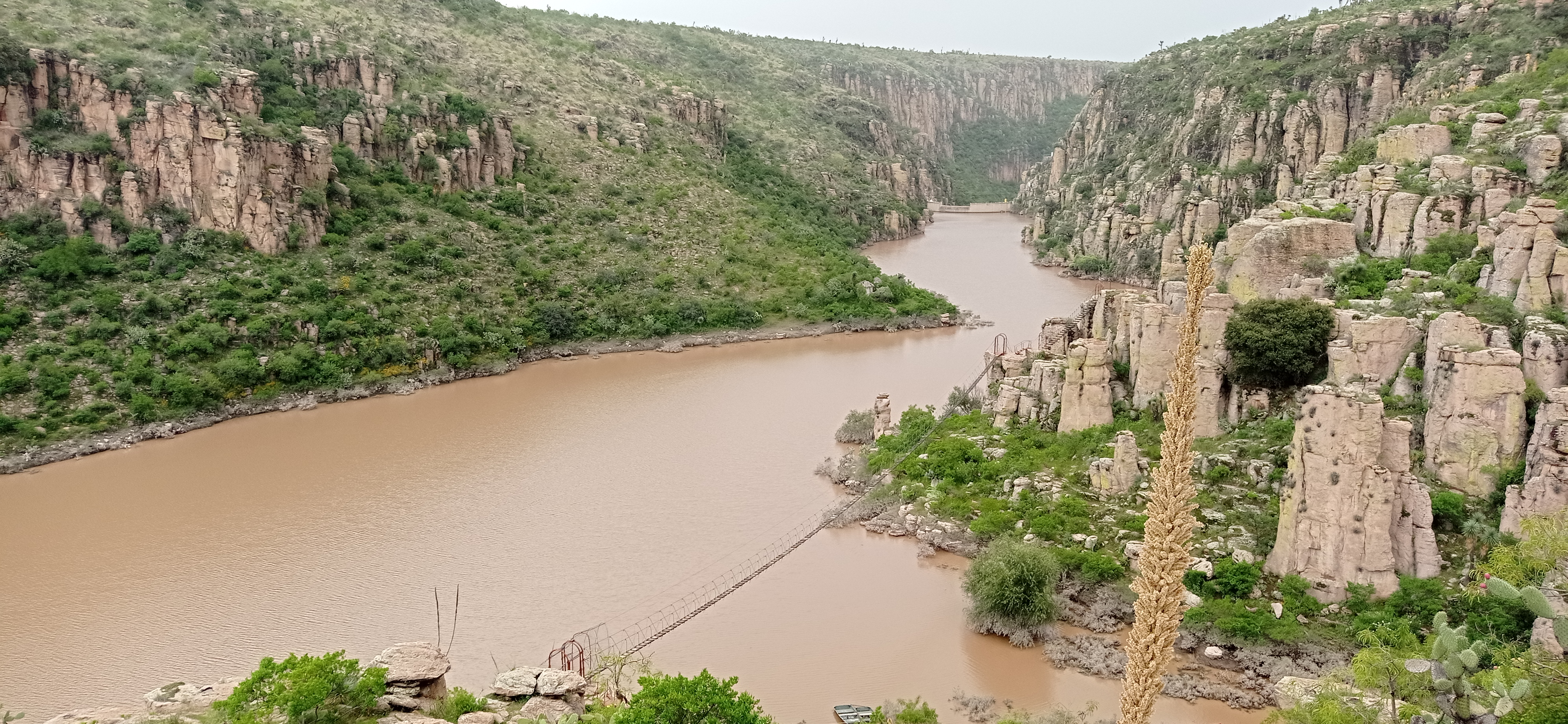
Boca de Túnel, climbing park at the San José de Gracia municipality.

The state has one football team in the Mexican Premiere League, Club Necaxa; one professional baseball team in the Mexican League, Rieleros de Aguascalientes; and one professional basketball team, the Panteras de Aguascalientes. Aguascalientes also has important racetracks for car and motorbike races at a national and international level.

== Media ==
Newspapers of Aguascalientes include: Ahí, El Heraldo de Aguascalientes, El Sol del Centro de Aguascalientes, Hidrocálido, LJA, and Picacho Panorama de Aguascalientes.

== Major communities ==
- Aguascalientes
- Asientos
- Calvillo
- Cosio
- Jesús María
- Pabellón de Arteaga
- Rincón de Romos
- San Francisco de los Romo
- San Jose de Gracia
- Tepezala

== Notable people ==
See also articles in the category People from Aguascalientes

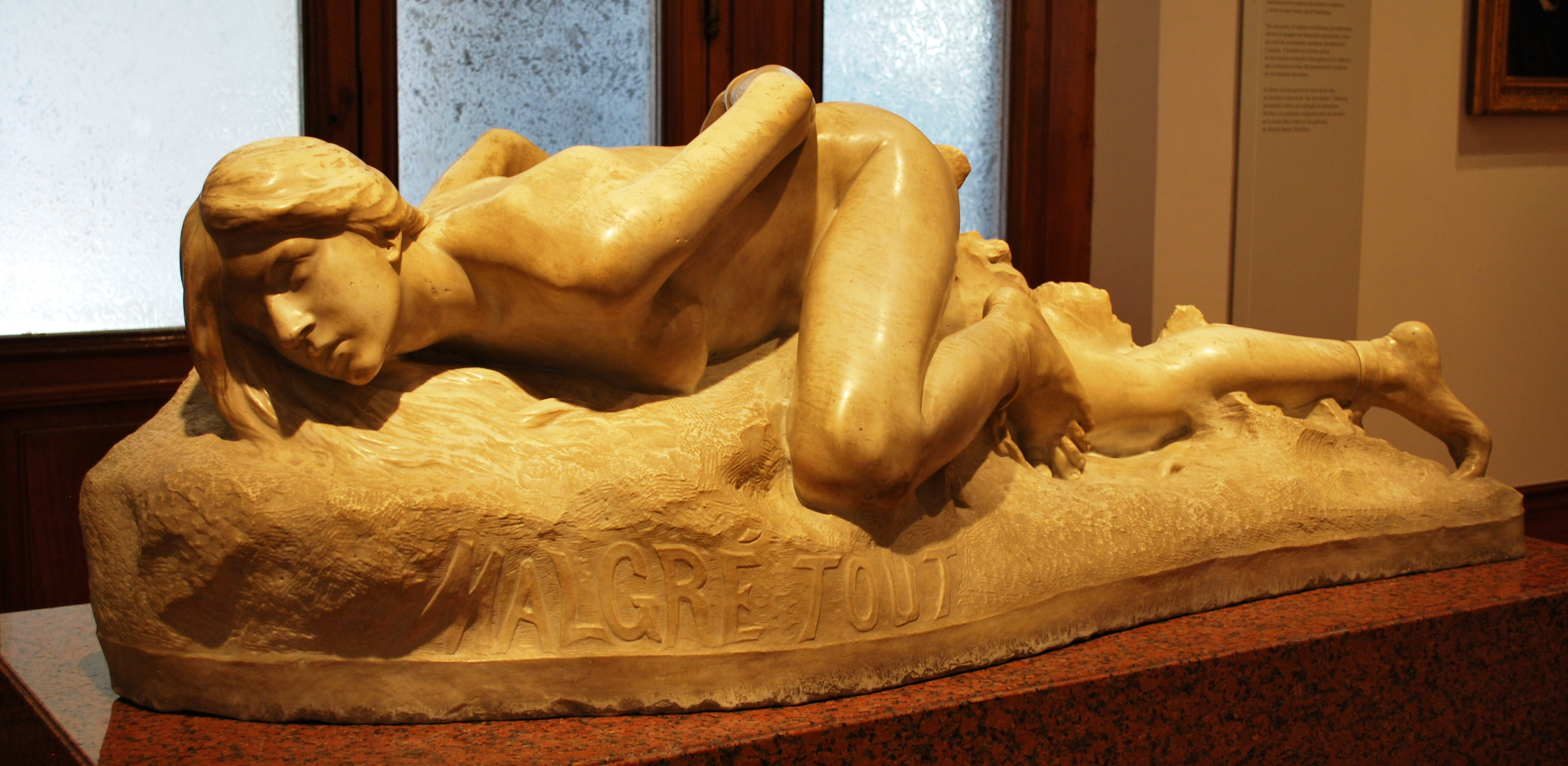
Malgré tout, by Jesús F. Contreras.

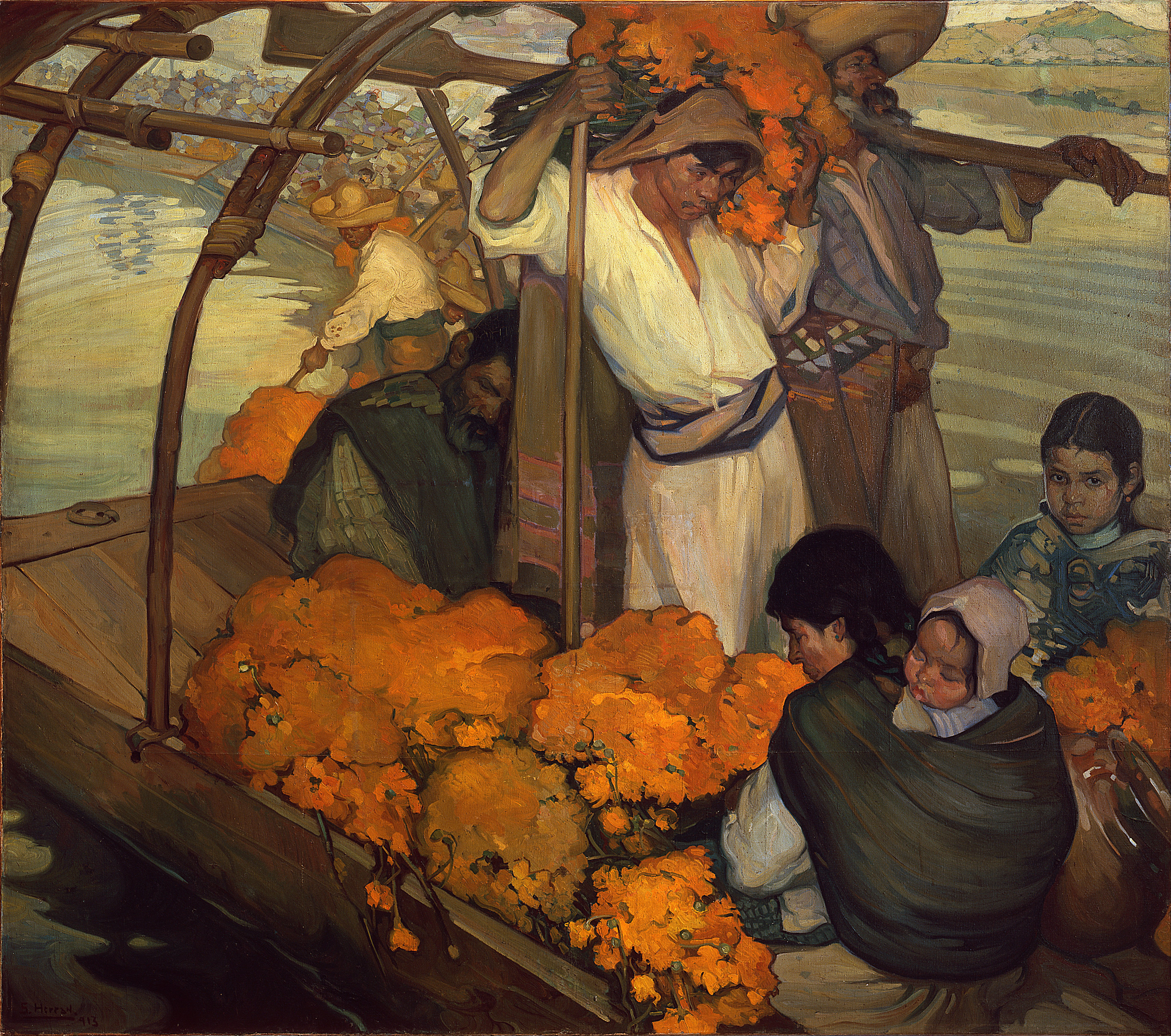
La Ofrenda, by Saturnino Herrán.

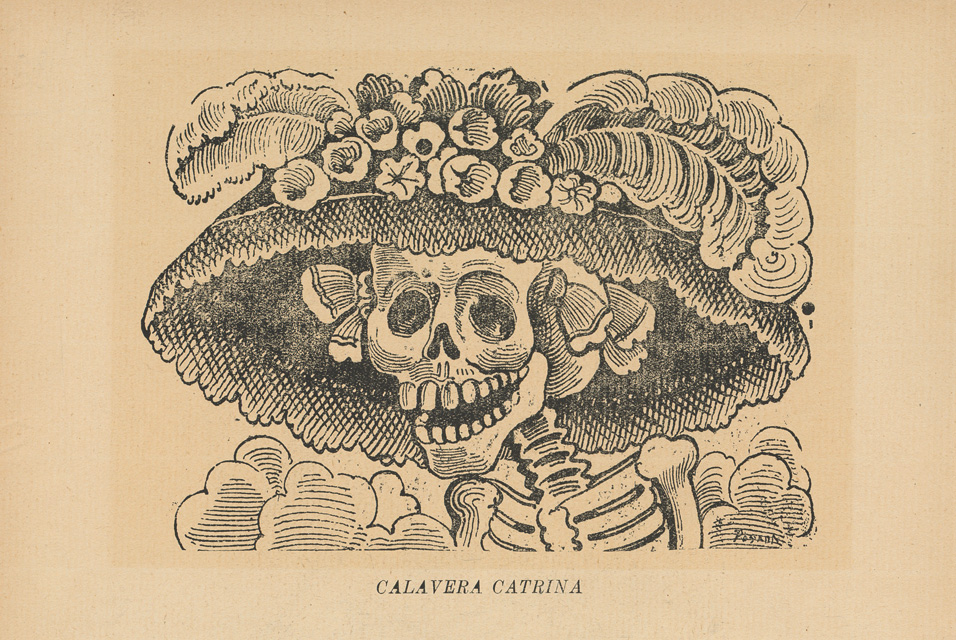
La Catrina, by José Guadalupe Posada.
- José María Bocanegra, third President of Mexico
- Yadhira Carrillo, Actress
- Jesús Fructuoso Contreras, Artist
- Sebastián Córdova, Mexican soccer player who plays for Liga MX club Club América
- Wendolly Esparza, American-born Mexican television personality best known for winning Miss Mexico 2014.
- Anabel Ferreira, Actress/Comedian
- Karina González, Model and Nuestra Belleza México 2011
- Saturnino Herrán, Artist
- Luis Gerardo Méndez, Mexican Actor
- Jose Maria Napoleón, Singer and composer
- Gabriela Palacio, model and Nuestra Belleza Mundo México 2010.
- Manuel M. Ponce, Musician
- José Guadalupe Posada, Artist
- Violeta Retamoza, Professional golfer
- David Reynoso, Actor
- Armida Vendrell, Actress, dancer, and vaudevillian
- William Yarbrough, Mexican-born American soccer player
- Anita Brenner, Jewish-Mexican writer, artist and anthropologist

== See also ==
- Automotive industry in Mexico
