= Tepezalá =

- Municipality
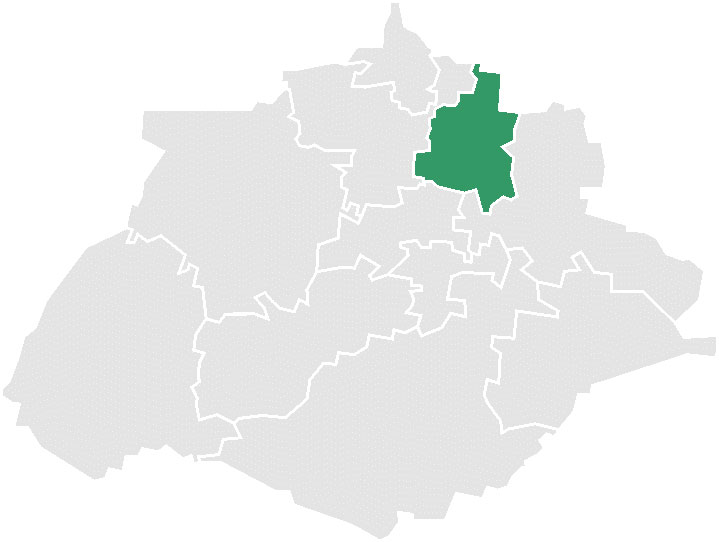
- Municipality location in Aguascalientes

- Location in Mexico
- Coordinates: 22°13′N 102°10′W
- Country: Mexico
- State: Aguascalientes
- Municipality: Tepezalá

Government
  - Federal electoral district: Aguascalientes's 1st

Area
  - Land: 232.664 km^{2} (89.832 sq mi)

Population (2015)
  - Total: 20,926
  - Density: 89.9/km^{2} (233/sq mi)

Tepezalá is a municipality and town in the Mexican state of Aguascalientes. The town of Tepezalá serves as the municipal seat for the surrounding municipality of Tepezalá.

Tepezala is located on the foothills of the eastern mountains of the state, a land rich in minerals and arid in vegetation that was on the old Silver Route during the 16th century, which brought so much wealth to the region and help conquer the inhospitable north of Mexico. The town's mines made it famous and brought wealth to the state.

== Demographics ==
Historical population
Year	Pop.	±%
2010	19,668	—
2015	20,926	+6.4%
2020	22,485	+7.5%

As of the 2015 Mexican Intercensal Survey, Tepezalá municipality has a population of 20,926. As of 2010, the town of Tepezalá had a total population of 4,511. Other than the town of Tepezalá, the municipality had 132 localities, the largest of which (with 2010 populations in parentheses) were: San Antonio (3,345), classified as urban, and El Chayote (1,817), and Carboneras (1,261), classified as rural.

== Geography ==
=== Climate ===
Climate data for Tepezala (1991–2020)
Month	Jan	Feb	Mar	Apr	May	Jun	Jul	Aug	Sep	Oct	Nov	Dec	Year
Record high °C (°F)	31.0 (87.8)	31.5 (88.7)	33.0 (91.4)	37.0 (98.6)	37.0 (98.6)	37.0 (98.6)	35.5 (95.9)	34.0 (93.2)	36.0 (96.8)	32.5 (90.5)	31.0 (87.8)	35.0 (95.0)	37.0 (98.6)
Mean daily maximum °C (°F)	21.3 (70.3)	23.9 (75.0)	26.6 (79.9)	29.3 (84.7)	30.6 (87.1)	29.9 (85.8)	27.0 (80.6)	27.1 (80.8)	25.6 (78.1)	25.5 (77.9)	23.7 (74.7)	22.0 (71.6)	26.0 (78.8)
Daily mean °C (°F)	12.9 (55.2)	15.2 (59.4)	17.3 (63.1)	20.0 (68.0)	21.5 (70.7)	21.6 (70.9)	19.8 (67.6)	19.8 (67.6)	18.8 (65.8)	18.3 (64.9)	15.6 (60.1)	13.6 (56.5)	17.9 (64.2)
Mean daily minimum °C (°F)	4.5 (40.1)	6.4 (43.5)	8.1 (46.6)	10.7 (51.3)	12.4 (54.3)	13.4 (56.1)	12.6 (54.7)	12.5 (54.5)	12.0 (53.6)	11.1 (52.0)	7.4 (45.3)	5.2 (41.4)	9.7 (49.5)
Record low °C (°F)	−11.0 (12.2)	−2.0 (28.4)	−2.0 (28.4)	0.0 (32.0)	1.0 (33.8)	4.5 (40.1)	5.0 (41.0)	4.0 (39.2)	2.0 (35.6)	1.0 (33.8)	−2.0 (28.4)	−5.5 (22.1)	−11.0 (12.2)
Average precipitation mm (inches)	19.0 (0.75)	12.6 (0.50)	6.2 (0.24)	4.1 (0.16)	14.2 (0.56)	77.3 (3.04)	107.1 (4.22)	85.9 (3.38)	79.9 (3.15)	26.1 (1.03)	9.4 (0.37)	7.9 (0.31)	449.7 (17.70)
Average precipitation days (≥ 0.1 mm)	2.1	1.7	1.0	1.1	2.7	8.4	11.4	9.6	8.2	3.4	1.6	1.1	52.3
Source: Servicio Meteorologico Nacional

== Gallery ==
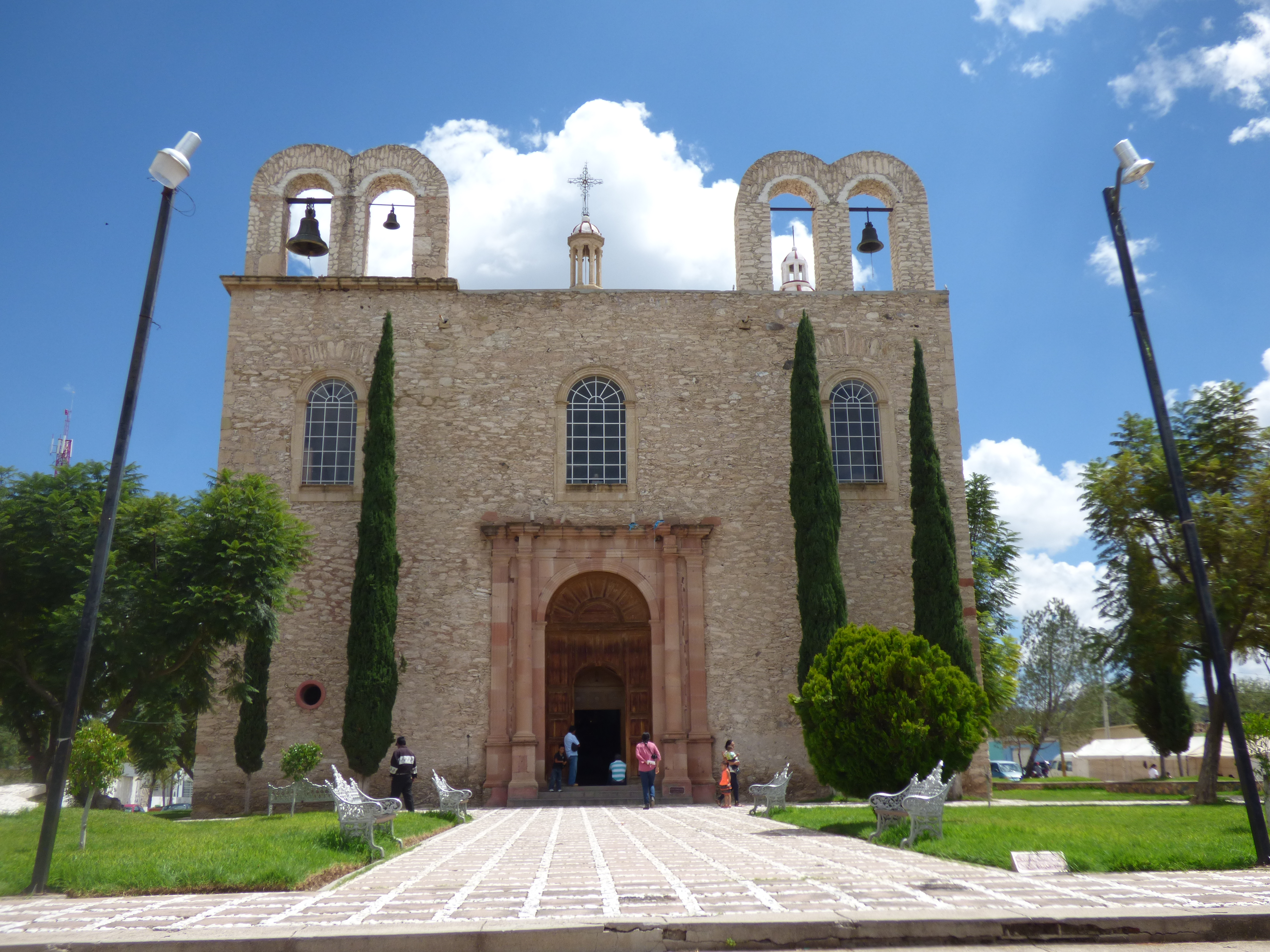
Templo del Nuestra Señora del Refugio, fachada.

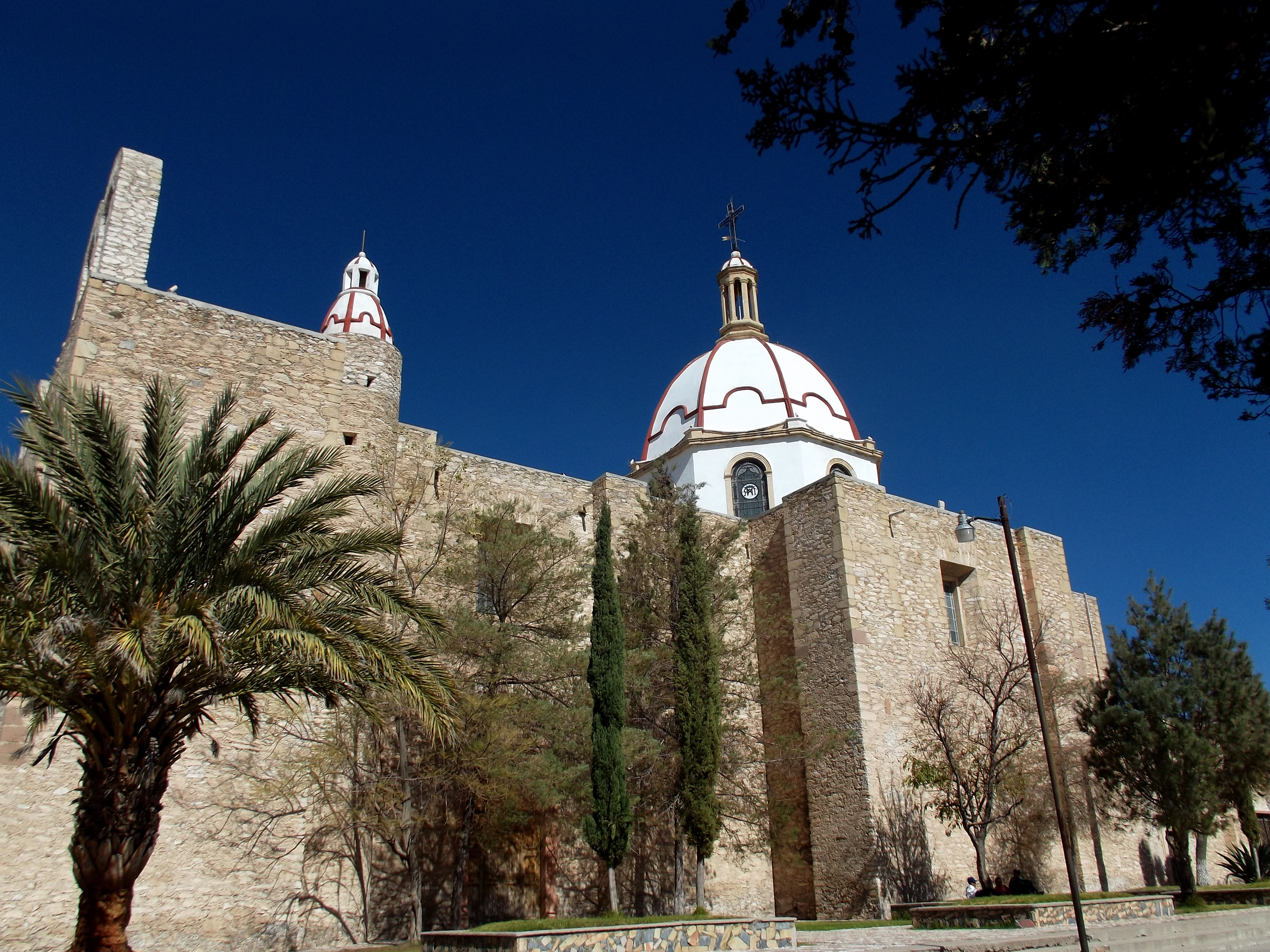
Templo de Nuestra Señora del Refugio, vista lateral.

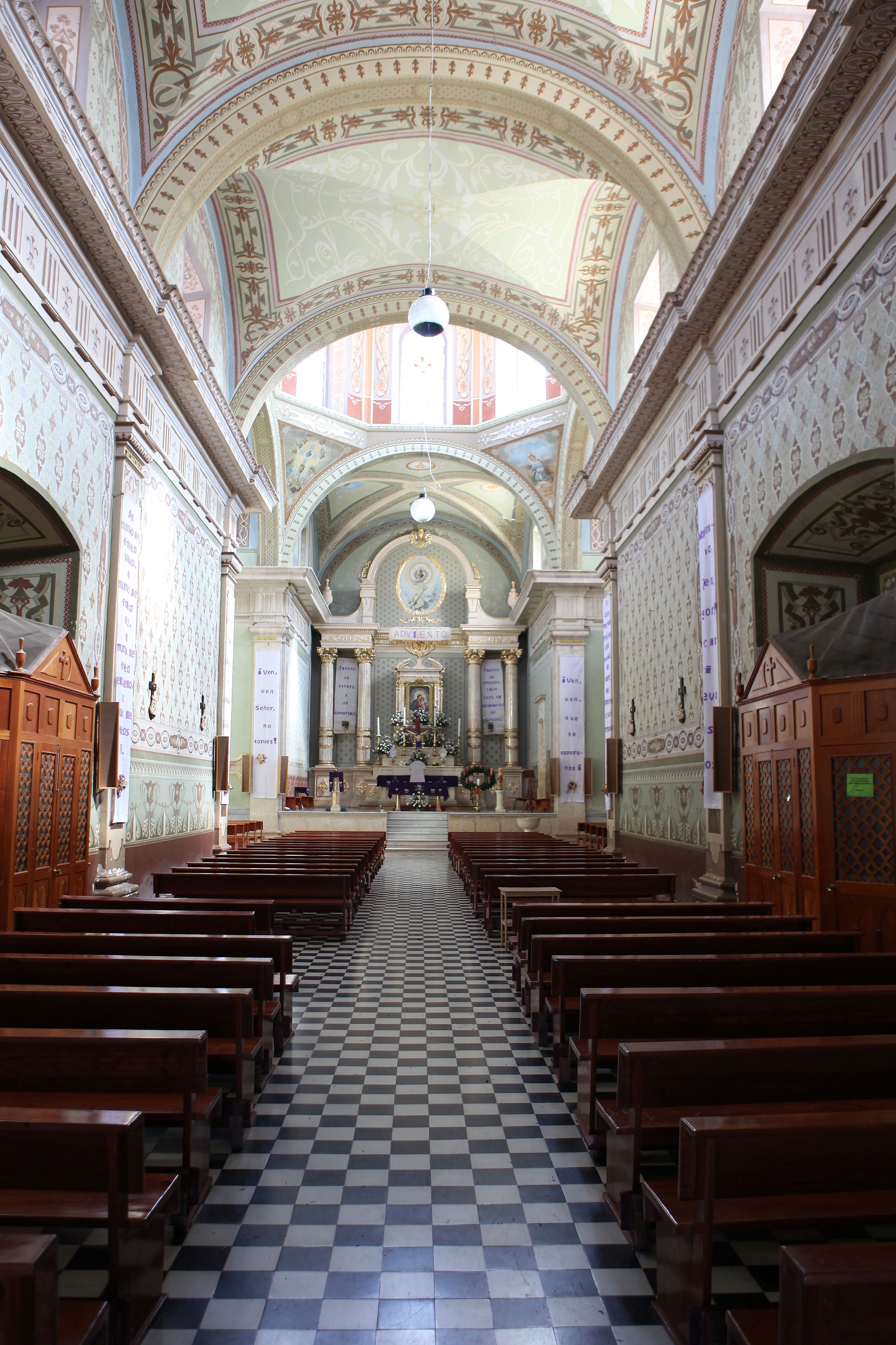
Templo de Nuestra Señora del Refugio, interior.

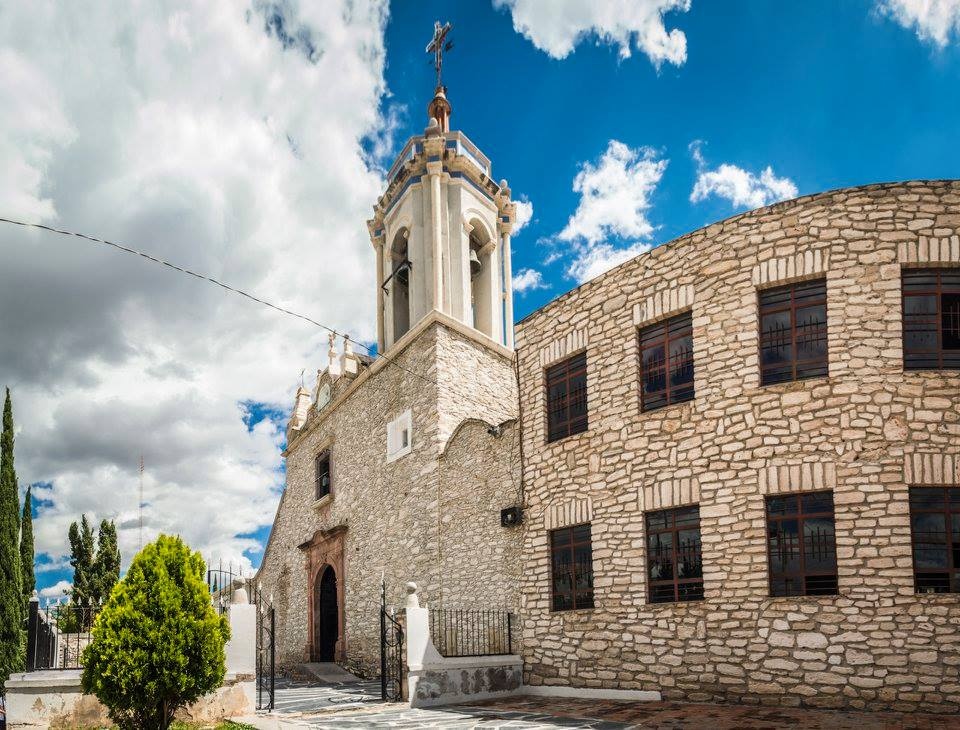
Santuario del Señor de Tepezalá.
