= List of highways in Durango =

The following is a list of highways in the state of Durango (DGO) in Mexico.

== Federal Highways ==
- Fed. 23: Guanaceví, DGO – San Francisco del Mezquital, DGO
- Fed. 24: Parral, CHIH - Guadalupe y Calvo, CHIH
- Fed. 30: El Palmito, DGO – Gómez Palacio, DGO
- Fed. 34: San Antonio, DGO - Cuatillos, DGO
- Fed. 36: Canelas, DGO - Mexican Federal Highway 23, DGO
- Fed. 40: Mazatlán, SIN - Gómez Palacio, DGO
- Fed. 40D: Mazatlán, SIN - Gómez Palacio, DGO
- Fed. 45: Parral, CHIH - Sombrerete, ZAC
- Fed. 49: Jiménez, CHIH – Juan Aldama, ZAC
- Fed. 49D: Jiménez, CHIH – Juan Aldama, ZAC

== State Highways ==
- Durango State Highway 1: Peñón Blanco, DGO – Juan Moya, DGO
- Durango State Highway 5: Gómez Palacio, DGO – Tlahualilo de Zaragoza, DGO
- Durango State Highway 22: Mexican Federal Highway 40, DGO – La Union, DGO
- Durango State Highway 38: Dinamita, DGO - Gomez Palacio, DGO
- Durango State Highway 39: Poanas, DGO - Gomez Palacio, DGO
- Durango State Highway 40: Lerdo, DGO - Diego, DGO
- Durango State Highway 41: Poanas, DGO - Mexican Federal Highway 49, DGO
- Durango State Highway 42: Mexican Federal Highway 49, DGO - Tlahualilo de Zaragoza, DGO
- Durango State Highway 43: Carolina, DGO - Tlahualilo de Zaragoza, DGO
- Durango State Highway 44: Ciénaga de Escobar, DGO – Mexican Federal Highway 49D, DGO
- Durango State Highway 50: Dinamita, DGO - Fed 49, DGO
- Durango State Highway 64: El Jaralito, DGO - Fed 49, DGO
- Durango State Highway 65: Santa Maria de la Paz, DGO - Fed 49, DGO
- Durango State Highway 66: Durango State Highway 45, DGO - Fed 49, DGO
- Durango State Highway 77: Mexican Federal Highway 49, DGO - La Flor, DGO
- Durango State Highway 78: Mexican Federal Highway 49, DGO - Jesus Maria, CHIH
- Durango State Highway 79: Emiliano Zapata, DGO - DGO 44, DGO
- Durango State Highway 80: El Diamante, DGO - Durango State Highway 44, DGO
- Durango State Highway 81: Nazas, DGO - Mexican Federal Highway 30, DGO
- Durango State Highway 82: Durango State Highway 81, DGO - Colon, DGO
- Durango State Highway 93: Lerdo, DGO - Sapioris, DGO
- Durango State Highway 99: Mexican Federal Highway 49, COA - Mexican Federal Highway 49, DGO - Laguna Bypass
- Durango State Highway 100: San Miguel de Cruces, DGO - Mexican Federal Highway 40, DGO
- Durango State Highway 102: El Salto, DGO - Pueblo Nuevo, DGO
- Durango State Highway 103: Pueblo Nuevo, DGO - La Escondida, DGO
- Durango State Highway 104: Pueblo Nuevo, DGO - Jacuxtle, DGO
- Durango State Highway 115: Durango, DGO – La Flor, DGO
- Durango State Highway 116: Fed 23, DGO - San Miguel de Temoaya, DGO
- Durango State Highway 117: Fed 40, DGO - Santa Barbara, DGO
- Durango State Highway 118: Otinapa, DGO - Durango, DGO
- Durango State Highway 119: Otinapa, DGO - Fed 40, DGO
- Durango State Highway 120: Lerdo de Tejada, DGO - Mexican Federal Highway 45, DGO
- Durango State Highway 121: Santiago Bayacora, DGO - Mexican Federal Highway 45, DGO
- Durango State Highway 122: Nicolas Romero, DGO - Mexican Federal Highway 23, DGO
- Durango State Highway 123: Mexican Federal Highway 23, DGO - Mexican Federal Highway 23, DGO – Durango Ring Road
- Durango State Highway 137: Francisco I. Madero, DGO – San Juan del Rion, DGO
- Durango State Highway 140: Cinco de Febrero, DGO - Mexican Federal Highway 45, DGO
- Durango State Highway 150: El Arenal, DGO - Mexican Federal Highway 45, DGO
- Durango State Highway 162: La Torreña, DGO - Gomez Palacios, DGO
- Durango State Highway 200: Mexican Federal Highway 45, DGO - Mexican Federal Highway 45, DGO – Nombre de Dios Bypass
- Durango State Highway 205: San Bernardino de Milpillas, DGO - Calabazas, DGO
- Durango State Highway 213: Vicente Guerrero, DGO – Súchil, DGO
- Durango State Highway 216: Mexican Federal Highway 45, DGO - Tuitan, DGO
- Durango State Highway 217: Tuitan, DGO - Nombre de Dios, DGO
- Durango State Highway 218: Tuitan, DGO - Amado Nervo, DGO
- Durango State Highway 219: Mexican Federal Highway 45, DGO - El Venado, DGO
- Durango State Highway 220: Mexican Federal Highway 45, DGO - San Jose de la Parrilla, DGO
- Durango State Highway 221: San Francisco del Mezquital, DGO - Temoaya, DGO
- Durango State Highway 222: San Miguel de la Michilia, DGO - Suchil, DGO
- Durango State Highway 223: Villa Union, DGO - Amado Nervo, DGO
- Durango State Highway 241: Durango State Highway 500, DGO - Vicente Guerrero, DGO
- Durango State Highway 254: Suchil, DGO - Gualterio ZAC
- Durango State Highway 260: Guatimape, DGO - San Juan del Rion, DGO
- Durango State Highway 300: Mexican Federal Highway 49D, DGO, Mexican Federal Highway 49D, DGO – Cuencame Bypass
- Durango State Highway 316: Penon Blanco, DGO, Mexican Federal Highway 49D, DGO
- Durango State Highway 325: Mexican Federal Highway 49, DGO - El Vergel, DGO
- Durango State Highway 333: San Juan de Guadalupe, DGO - El Oregano, DGO
- Durango State Highway 334: Cuencamé, DGO - Lagunilla, DGO
- Durango State Highway 335: Cuencame, DGO - Durango State Highway 431, DGO
- Durango State Highway 362: Esmeralda, DGO - Jabonoso, DGO
- Durango State Highway 386: Ignacio Allende, DGO – Miguel Auza, ZAC
- Durango State Highway 431: Mexican Federal Highway 49, DGO - El Aguaje, DGO
- Durango State Highway 432: El Aguaje, DGO - San Juan de Guadalupe, DGO
- Durango State Highway 436: Huariche, DGO - Durango State Highway 431, DGO
- Durango State Highway 437: Santa Rosa, DGO - Durango State Highway 431, DGO
- Durango State Highway 500: Guadalupe Victoria, DGO - Ramon Corona, DGO
- Durango State Highway 524: La Roca, DGO - Cuahutemoc, DGO
- Durango State Highway 525: La Roca, DGO - Mexican Federal Highway 49, DGO
- Durango State Highway 526: San Francisco de la Palmita, DGO - Calixto Contreras, DGO
- Durango State Highway 527: Mexican Federal Highway 40, DGO - Cerro Santiago, DGO
- Durango State Highway 528: Jose Agustin Castro, DGO - Mexican Federal Highway 49, DGO
- Durango State Highway 529: Yerbanis, DGO - Atotonilco, DGO
- Durango State Highway 530: Mexican Federal Highway 49, DGO - Isabel Robles, DGO
- Durango State Highway 542: Mexican Federal Highway 45, DGO - La Ochoa, DGO

== See also ==
- List of Mexican Federal Highways
- List of Mexican autopistas
