= Mexican Federal Highway 45 =

Highway in Mexico

Federal Highway 45
- Carretera federal 45

Route information
- Maintained by Secretariat of Infrastructure, Communications and Transportation
- Length: 1,491.73 km (926.92 mi)

Major junctions
- South end: Panales, Hidalgo
- Fed. 85 in Portezuelo Fed. 57 in Puerta de Palmillas; Fed. 120 in San Juan del Río; Fed. 71 in San Francisco de los Romo; Fed. 49 in Troncoso, Las Palmas y Jiménez; Fed. 54 in Zacatecas; Fed. 40 in Durango; Fed. 23 in Durango; Fed. 34 in Conejo; Fed. 24 in Hidalgo del Parral; Fed. 16 in Chihuahua City; Fed. 10 in El Sueco Fed. 2 in Ciudad Juárez
- North end: I-110 at the U.S. border in El Paso, TX

Location
- Country: Mexico

Highway system
- Mexican Federal Highways; List; Autopistas
← Fed. 44	→ Fed. 49

Federal Highway 45 (La Carretera Federal 45) (Fed. 45) is the toll-free (libre) part of the federal highways corridors (los corredores carreteros federales), and connects Ciudad Juárez, Chihuahua through the Chihuahuan Desert to Panales, Hidalgo.

It is operated under the management of the Secretariat of Communications and Transportation. Custody is the responsibility of the National Guard (GN). Fed. 45 is part of the Pan-American Highway. Federal Highway 45D is the tolled part of the route; in some areas the two run in parallel with the tolled section being faster.

== Route ==
The cities that are connected from north to south are Ciudad Juárez; Chihuahua City; Durango City; Zacatecas City; San Francisco de los Romo; Aguascalientes City; León, Guanajuato; Irapuato; Celaya, Guanajuato; Salamanca, Guanajuato; Querétaro City; Portezuelo; and Panales.

== Major intersections ==
State	Municipality	Location	km	mi	Destinations	Notes
Hidalgo	Tasquillo	Portezuelo			Fed. 85 – Zimapán, Nuevo Laredo, Pachuca, Mexico	Interchange
Hidalgo	Alfajayucan				San Francisco, Alfajayucan	Interchange
Hidalgo	Huichapan				Huichapan, El Cajon	Dual interchange
Hidalgo	Huichapan	Huichapan			Huichapan, Tecozautla (HGO 30)	Traffic circle
Hidalgo	Huichapan–Nopala de Villagrán boundary				SH 21 – Nopala	
Querétaro	San Juan del Río				Fed. 57 – Mexico, Queretaro, San Juan del Río	interchange
Querétaro	Gap in route					
Querétaro	Querétaro	Querétaro			Fed. 57 / Fed. 45D – San Luis Potosí, Juriquilla, Queretaro Centro, Mexico, San Juan del Rio, Centro SCT QRO	interchange
Querétaro	Querétaro	Querétaro			Club Campestre, Jardines de la Hacienda	interchange
Querétaro	Querétaro–Corregidora boundary	Querétaro			Candiles, Prolongacion Zaragoza	interchange
Querétaro	Corregidora				Tejeda, El Pueblito	interchange
Querétaro	Corregidora				El Pueblito, Los Olvera, Schoenstatt	interchange
Querétaro	Corregidora	El Pueblito			Santa Barbara, Coroneo (SH 413)	interchange
Querétaro	Corregidora				To Libramiento Sur-Poniente / Fed. 57 – San Luis Potosí	interchange
Guanajuato	Apaseo el Alto	No major junctions				
Guanajuato	Apaseo el Grande	No major junctions				
Guanajuato	Apaseo el Alto	San Isidro del Llanito			San Juan del Llanito	Interchange
Guanajuato	Apaseo el Grande	No major junctions				
Guanajuato	Apaseo el Alto	No major junctions				
Guanajuato	Apaseo el Grande	No major junctions				
Guanajuato	Apaseo el Alto				Fed. 47D – Palmillas	Interchange
Guanajuato	Apaseo el Alto				SH 47 – Jerecuaro	Interchange
Guanajuato	Apaseo el Alto	Apaseo el Alto			SH 37	Interchange; northbound exit and entrance
Guanajuato	Apaseo el Alto	Apaseo el Alto			Apaseo el Alto	Interchange; no southbound entrance
Guanajuato	Apaseo el Grande	San José Agua Azul			S. J. Agua Azul	Interchange
Guanajuato	Apaseo el Grande	Apaseo el Grande			To Fed. 45D – Apaseo el Grande	Interchange
Guanajuato	Apaseo el Grande–Celaya boundary				San Miguel de Allende, Irapuato, Salvatierra (SH 45D)	Interchange
Guanajuato	Celaya	Celaya			Traffic circle	Interchange
Guanajuato	Celaya	Celaya			Avenida 2 de Abril – Jardines neighborhood	Interchange; direct southbound exit and northbound entrance
Guanajuato	Celaya	Celaya			Fed. 51 – Salvatierra, Morelia	Dual interchange with another road
Guanajuato	Celaya	Celaya			(unsigned)	Interchange
Guanajuato	Celaya	Celaya			(unsigned) – Pancho Villa monument	Interchange
Guanajuato	Celaya				San Miguel de Allende	Interchange
Guanajuato	Celaya				Salvatierra (SH 45D)	Interchange
Guanajuato	Celaya	San Isidro de Crespo			To Captain Rogelio Castillo National Airport	Interchange
Guanajuato	Cortazar	La Fortaleza			Cortazar	Interchange
Guanajuato	Villagrán	Villagrán			Villagrán	Interchange
Guanajuato	Villagrán	Sarabia			Sarabia	Interchange
Guanajuato	Villagrán	Mexicanos			Mexicanos	Interchange
Guanajuato	Salamanca	Valtierrilla			Valtierrilla	Interchange
Guanajuato	Salamanca				Fed. 43D – León, Ixtapa	Interchange
Guanajuato	Salamanca	Salamanca			Salamanca downtown	Interchange
Guanajuato	Salamanca	Salamanca			Fed. 43 – Salamanca	Interchange
Guanajuato	Salamanca	Salamanca			(unsigned)	Interchange
Guanajuato	Salamanca	Salamanca			Salamanca	Interchange
Guanajuato	Salamanca	Salamanca			Salamanca downtown	Interchange
Guanajuato	Salamanca				To Mazda North American plant	Interchange
Guanajuato	Salamanca–Irapuato boundary				San Vicente, Loma de San Antonio	Interchange
Guanajuato	Irapuato				Irapuato industrial area	Interchange
Guanajuato	Irapuato	Irapuato			Fed. 45D – Guadalajara, La Piedad	Interchange; south end of Fed. 45D concurrency
Guanajuato	Irapuato	Irapuato			Fed. 45D – La Piedad	Interchange; north end of Fed. 45D concurrency
Guanajuato	Irapuato	Irapuato			Col Olivos Malvas	Interchange
Guanajuato	Irapuato	Irapuato			Irapuato downtown	Interchange; no northbound exit
Guanajuato	Irapuato				Fed. 43D to Fed. I20D – Morelia, Guadalajara, La Piedad	Interchange
Guanajuato	Irapuato	Taretan			Turnaround	Right-in/right-out interchange
Guanajuato	Irapuato				Castro del Rio industrial area	Interchange; no left-turn exits
Guanajuato	Irapuato	Aldama			Aldama	Interchange
Guanajuato	Guanajuato	Los Nicolases			Los Nicolases	Interchange
Guanajuato	Silao de la Victoria				Fed. 110 – Dolores Hidalgo	Interchange
Guanajuato	Silao de la Victoria				Fipasi industrial area	Interchange; no signage northbound
Guanajuato	Silao de la Victoria	Silao			Fed. 110D	Interchange
Guanajuato	Silao de la Victoria	Silao			SH 77 – Central Camionera, San Felipe	Interchange
Guanajuato	Silao de la Victoria	Silao			(unsigned)	Interchange
Guanajuato	Silao de la Victoria	Colonias Nuevo Mexico			To Guanajuato International Airport	Interchange
Guanajuato	Silao de la Victoria				Puerto Interior industrial area	Interchange
Guanajuato	León	Los Sauces			León-Comanjilla	Interchange
Guanajuato	León	León			Santa Ana del Conde	Interchange
Guanajuato	León	León			Fed. 45D – Guadalajara, Aguascalientes, Lagos de Moreno	Interchange
Guanajuato	León	León			(unsigned)	Interchange
Guanajuato	León	León			Museo de la Ciudad	Interchange
Guanajuato	León	León			Lagos de Moreno, San Felipe, Aguascalientes	Interchange
Guanajuato	León	León			Boulevard la Luz	Interchange
Guanajuato	León	León			Boulevard Vicente Valtierra / Boulevard Vertiz Campero	Interchange
Guanajuato	León	León			Boulevard Juan Alonso de Torres	Interchange
Guanajuato	León	León			Boulevard Téllez Cruces	Interchange
Guanajuato	León	León			Boulevard Hilario Medina	Interchange
Guanajuato	León	León			Boulevard Antonio Madrazo	Interchange
Guanajuato	León	León			Boulevard Ibarrilla	Interchange
Guanajuato	León	León			Boulevard Hidalgo (SH 87)	Interchange
Guanajuato	León	León			Avenida Transportistas	Interchange
Guanajuato	León	León			Central León	Dual interchange
Guanajuato	León	León			Cataluña, Cartagena, Cordillera	Traffic circle
Guanajuato	León	León			Boulevard San Juan Bosco	Interchange
Guanajuato	León				(unsigned)	Interchange
Jalisco	Lagos de Moreno				(SH 537)	
Jalisco	Lagos de Moreno	Lagos de Moreno			Fed. 80 / Fed. 80D – Guadalajara, Aguascalientes, San Luis Potosí	Interchange; south end of Fed. 80 concurrency
Jalisco	Lagos de Moreno	Lagos de Moreno			SH 302	
Jalisco	Lagos de Moreno	Lagos de Moreno			Fed. 80 – Guadalajara	Interchange; north end of Fed. 80 concurrency
Jalisco	Encarnación de Díaz				SH 214 – Bajío de San José	
Jalisco	Encarnación de Díaz	Encarnación de Díaz			(SH 307)	
Jalisco	Encarnación de Díaz	Encarnación de Díaz			(SH 212)	
Jalisco	Encarnación de Díaz				Fed. 45D – Encarnación de Díaz	Interchange; southbound exit and northbound entrance
Jalisco	Encarnación de Díaz				SH 214 – Nochistlan, Teocaltiche, Mexticacan	
Aguascalientes	Aguascalientes	Peñuelas			SH 2 – Aguascalientes International Airport	Interchange
Aguascalientes	Aguascalientes				SH 69 – San Bartolo, León	Interchange
Aguascalientes	Aguascalientes				Fed. 45D – Zacatecas, Calvillo	Interchange
Aguascalientes	Aguascalientes	Aguascalientes			SH 110 – Ojuelos, Los Arellano, Planta Jatco	Interchange
Aguascalientes	Aguascalientes	Aguascalientes			León	Interchange
Aguascalientes	Aguascalientes	Aguascalientes			Avenida Aguascalientes	Interchange
Aguascalientes	Aguascalientes	Aguascalientes			Fed. 70	Interchange; south end of Fed. 70 concurrency
Aguascalientes	Aguascalientes	Aguascalientes			Fed. 70 – San Luis Potosí, Alberca Olimpica	Interchange; north end of Fed. 70 concurrency
Aguascalientes	Aguascalientes	Aguascalientes			(unsigned)	Interchange
Aguascalientes	Aguascalientes	Aguascalientes			Avenida Nazario Ortiz Garza / Avenida Gabriela Mistral (SH 60)	Dual interchange
Aguascalientes	Aguascalientes	Aguascalientes			(unsigned)	Interchange
Aguascalientes	Aguascalientes	Aguascalientes			Avenida Aguascalientes	Interchange
Aguascalientes	Aguascalientes	Aguascalientes			Altaria commercial area / Boulevard Luis Donaldo Colosio	Interchange
Aguascalientes	Aguascalientes–Jesús María boundary	Aguascalientes			Avenida Siglo XXI	Partial diverging stack interchange
Aguascalientes	Aguascalientes–Jesús María–San Francisco de los Romo boundary				Fed. 25 – Asientos, Pueblo Magico	Interchange
Aguascalientes	Jesús María–San Francisco de los Romo boundary				SH 65 – La Guayana, Zacatecas	Interchange
Aguascalientes	Jesús María	Jesús Gómez Portugal			(SH 28)	No access northbound
Aguascalientes	Jesús María				(SH 131)	No access northbound
Aguascalientes	Jesús María				(SH 45)	No access northbound
Aguascalientes	Jesús María				Fed. 45D – León, Guadalajara	Interchange
Aguascalientes	Jesús María–San Francisco de los Romo boundary				(SH 32)	No access southbound
Aguascalientes	Jesús María–San Francisco de los Romo boundary				(SH 97)	No access northbound
Aguascalientes	San Francisco de los Romo				San Francisco de los Romo	Interchange
Aguascalientes	San Francisco de los Romo	San Francisco de los Romo			(SH 73)	Northbound exit and entrance
Aguascalientes	San Francisco de los Romo–Pabellón de Arteaga boundary				San Francisco de los Romo	Interchange
Aguascalientes	Pabellón de Arteaga				(SH 18)	No access northbound
Aguascalientes	Pabellón de Arteaga				(SH 27)	Northbound exit and entrance
Aguascalientes	Pabellón de Arteaga				(SH 46)	No access northbound
Aguascalientes	Pabellón de Arteaga–Rincón de Romos boundary	Pabellón de Arteaga			SH 20 – Pabellón de Arteaga Hospital	Interchange
Aguascalientes	Pabellón de Arteaga–Rincón de Romos boundary				Pabellón de Hidalgo (SH 19)	Southbound exit and entrance
Aguascalientes	Rincón de Romos	El Salitrillo			Fed. 45D – Zacatecas	Interchange
Aguascalientes	Rincón de Romos	Rincón de Romos			Fed. 22 – Tepezala, Pueblo Magico	
Aguascalientes	Rincón de Romos	Rincón de Romos			(SH 54)	
Aguascalientes	Rincón de Romos	El Bajío			SH 70 – La Boquilla	
Aguascalientes	Rincón de Romos				Fed. 45D – Aguascalientes	Interchange
Aguascalientes	Cosío	La Puenta			SH 26 – Valle de las Delicias	Interchange
Aguascalientes	Cosío	Cosío			SH 25 – La Providencia	Northbound exit and entrance
Aguascalientes	Cosío	Cosío			SH 64 – Cosío	Interchange
Aguascalientes	Cosío				National Guard checkpoint	
Aguascalientes	Cosío				Fed. 45D – Zacatecas	Interchange
Aguascalientes	Cosío	Soledad de Abajo			SH 39 – Zacatequillas	Interchange; northbound exit and southbound entrance
Aguascalientes	Cosío	Soledad de Abajo			SH 62 – Soledad de Abajo	Interchange; southbound exit and northbound entrance
Zacatecas	Luis Moya	Luis Moya			Fed. 71 – Loreto	
Zacatecas	Luis Moya	Esteban san Castorena			SH 210 – Cuauhtémoc	
Zacatecas	Ojocaliente				SH 144 – Pinos, General Pánfilo Natera	
Zacatecas	Trancoso				Fed. 49 – San Luis Potosí	Interchange; no southbound entrance
Zacatecas	Trancoso				Trancoso	Interchange; no northbound exit
Zacatecas	Guadalupe				SH 175 – Saltillo, Pozo de Gamboa, Tacoaleche	Interchange
Zacatecas	Guadalupe				Fed. 45D – Zacatecas	Interchange
Zacatecas	Guadalupe	Martínez Domínguez			Villas de Guadalupe	Interchange
Zacatecas	Guadalupe	Guadalupe			To Fed. 54 – Guadalupe, Durango, Guadalajara	Dual interchange
Zacatecas	Guadalupe	Guadalupe			La Condesa	Interchange
Zacatecas	Guadalupe	Guadalupe			Guadalupe	Interchange
Zacatecas	Guadalupe	Guadalupe			Central Guadalupe	Interchange
Zacatecas	Guadalupe	Guadalupe			(unsigned)	Interchange
Zacatecas	Zacatecas	Zacatecas			Avenida Garcia Salinas	Interchange
Zacatecas	Zacatecas	Zacatecas			Avenida Garcia Salinas	Interchange; no northbound exit
Zacatecas	Zacatecas	Zacatecas			A la Feria	Interchange
Zacatecas	Zacatecas	Zacatecas			La Encantada	Interchange; no northbound entrance
Zacatecas	Zacatecas	Zacatecas			A la Bufa	Interchange
Zacatecas	Zacatecas	Zacatecas			Zacatecas city administration	Interchange
Zacatecas	Zacatecas	Zacatecas			Zacatecas government offices	Interchange
Zacatecas	Zacatecas	Zacatecas			Fed. 54 – San Luis Potosí, Aguascalientes	Dual interchange; south end of Fed. 54 concurrency
Zacatecas	Morelos	Morelos			Fed. 45D / Fed. 54 / SH 205 – Noria de Gringos, Peñoles, Saltillo, San Luis Potosí, Aguascalientes	Dual interchange; north end of Fed. 54 concurrency
Zacatecas	Morelos–Calera boundary				Zacatecas International Airport	Interchange
Zacatecas	Calera	Víctor Rosales			Fed. 45D – Fresnillo	
Zacatecas	Calera	Víctor Rosales			SH 149 – Santaguillo	
Zacatecas	Calera	Víctor Rosales			SH 199	
Zacatecas	Calera	Víctor Rosales			Fed. 45D – Zacatecas, Durango	Interchange
Zacatecas	General Enrique Estrada	General Enrique Estrada			SH 175	
Zacatecas	General Enrique Estrada	General Enrique Estrada			Fed. 45D – San Luis Potosí, Aguascalientes, Zacatecas	
Zacatecas	General Enrique Estrada				SH 72	No access southbound
Zacatecas	General Enrique Estrada–Fresnillo boundary				SH 176 – Miguel Hidalgo	No access southbound
Zacatecas	Fresnillo				Fed. 45D – Durango, Torreón, Fresnillo	Interchange
Zacatecas	Fresnillo	Fresnillo			SH 60 – Calzada Proaño, Estación San José	Interchange
Zacatecas	Fresnillo	Fresnillo			Avenida a Plateros	Interchange
Zacatecas	Fresnillo	Fresnillo			Fed. 23 – Guadalajara, Tlaltenango	
Zacatecas	Fresnillo				Fed. 45D – San Luis Potosí, Aguascalientes	No access southbound from northbound Fed. 45D
Zacatecas	Fresnillo				Fed. 49 – Torreón, Río Grande	Interchange; no southbound exit
Zacatecas	Saín Alto				SH 90 – Río de Medina	
Zacatecas	Saín Alto				SH 91 – José María Morelos	
Zacatecas	Saín Alto	Atotonilco			SH 144	
Zacatecas	Saín Alto	La Y Griega			SH 143	
Zacatecas	Saín Alto				SH 88 – Cantuna	
Zacatecas	Sombrerete				SH 142 – Luis Moya	
Zacatecas	Sombrerete				SH 125 – González Ortega	
Zacatecas	Sombrerete				Fed. 45D – Durango	Interchange
Zacatecas	Sombrerete	Sombrerete			SH 240	
Zacatecas	Sombrerete	Sombrerete			SH 11	
Zacatecas	Sombrerete				Fed. 45D – Durango	Interchange
Zacatecas	Sombrerete				SH 103 – Colonia Hidalgo	
Zacatecas	Sombrerete				SH 109 – San Francisco de Órganos	
Zacatecas	Sombrerete	Villa Insurgentes			SH 113	
Durango	Vicente Guerrero				SH 110 – Salas Pérez	
Durango	Vicente Guerrero	Vicente Guerrero			SH 241 – La Joya	Interchange
1.000 mi = 1.609 km; 1.000 km = 0.621 mi: Concurrency terminus; Incomplete access; Tolled
