= Mexican Federal Highway 25 =

Highway in Mexico

Federal Highway 25
- Carretera federal 25
- Carretera Viñedos Ribier-San Marcos

Route information
- Maintained by Secretariat of Infrastructure, Communications and Transportation
- Length: 56 km (35 mi)

Major junctions
- South end: Fed. 45 in Viñedos Rivier
- Fed. 22 in Ciénega Grande
- North end: SH 186 in San Marcos

Location
- Country: Mexico
- States: Aguascalientes, Zacatecas

Highway system
- Mexican Federal Highways; List; Autopistas
| ← Fed. 24 | → Fed. 29 |

Federal Highway 25 (Spanish: Carretera Federal 25, Fed. 25) is a toll-free part of the federal highways corridors (Spanish: los corredores carreteros federales). It starts at Fed. 45 in Viñedos Rivier, Aguascalientes, runs east, then runs northeast to San Marcos, Zacatecas, just past Loreto, Zacatecas.

The section of Fed. 25 from Crisóstomos to San Marcos within Zacatecas carries the legal only designation of Federal Highway 66 (Spanish: Carretera Federal 66, Fed. 66).

== Route description ==
=== Aguascalientes ===
Fed. 25 begins at an interchange with Fed. 45 in Viñedos Rivier, just north of the city of Aguascalientes. The highway runs in an east-west direction for approximately its first kilometer then turns northeast near Ex-Viñedos Guadalupe then enters Puertecito de la Virgen, intersecting SH 152 before leaving the town. Fed. 25 then enters the town of Macario J. Gómez, intersecting SH 65 and SH 85 in the town. As the highway leaves Macario J. Gómez, the route transitions from a four lane divided highway to a two lane rural road. Fed. 25 turns back into a more east-west direction in General José María Morelos y Pavón before turning northeast again near Jaltomate. Between Villa Juárez and Ciénega Grande, the highway briefly enters the state of Zacatecas before re-entering Aguascalientes at Lázaro Cárdenas. In Ciénega Grande, Fed. 25 intersects Fed. 22, serving as that highway's eastern terminus. Northeast of Ciénega Grande, the highway enters Crisóstomos then leaves the state of Aguascalientes into Zacatecas.

=== Zacatecas ===
Fed. 25 enters Zacatecas at Crisóstomos, traveling in a more direct north-south direction to the town of Loreto. In Loreto, the highway briefly turns east and runs along a pair of one-way streets from SH 234 and Álvaro Obregón Sur. Leaving Loreto, Fed. 25 turns northeast, traveling to San Marcos, where the highway ends at an intersection with SH 186.

== Junction list ==
| State | Municipality | Location | km | mi | Destinations | Notes |
|---|---|---|---|---|---|---|
| Aguascalientes | San Francisco de los Romo | Viñedos Rivier | 0.0 | 0.0 | Fed. 45 – Aguascalientes, Zacatecas | Interchange; southern terminus |
| Aguascalientes | San Francisco de los Romo | Puertecito de la Virgen | 1.7 | 1.1 | SH 152 – Puertecito de la Virgen | |
| Aguascalientes | San Francisco de los Romo | Macario J. Gómez | 4.3 | 2.7 | SH 65 – La Guayana | Southbound access only |
| Aguascalientes | San Francisco de los Romo | Macario J. Gómez | 4.9 | 3.0 | SH 85 – Loretito, El Chicalote | |
| Aguascalientes | Aguascalientes | General José María Morelos y Pavón | 10.3 | 6.4 | SH 60 – Cumbres | |
| Aguascalientes | Aguascalientes | General José María Morelos y Pavón | 10.8 | 6.7 | SH 40 | |
| Aguascalientes | Aguascalientes | Jaltomate | 17.5 | 10.9 | SH 15 – San José de la Ordeña | |
| Aguascalientes | Aguascalientes | Jaltomate | 17.7 | 11.0 | SH 44 – Amapolas del Río | |
| Aguascalientes | Asientos | | 23.4 | 14.5 | SH 126 – Jilotepec | |
| Aguascalientes | Asientos | Villa Juárez | 27.2 | 16.9 | SH 112 | |
| Aguascalientes | Asientos | Villa Juárez | 30.0 | 18.6 | SH 5 | |
| Aguascalientes | Asientos | | 30.5 | 19.0 | SH 4 | |
| Aguascalientes | Asientos | | 34.9 | 21.7 | SH 43 | |
| Aguascalientes | Asientos | | 36.5 | 22.7 | SH 130 | |
| Aguascalientes | Asientos | Ciénega Grande | 42.1 | 26.2 | Fed. 22 – Rincón de Romos | |
| | | | 45.8– 0.0 | 28.5– 0.0 | Aguascalientes–Zacatecas state line | |
| Zacatecas | Loreto | El Socorro | 2.2 | 1.4 | SH 538 – El Socorro | |
| Zacatecas | Loreto | Loreto | 5.2 | 3.2 | SH 234 – Centro Loreto | |
| Zacatecas | Loreto | Loreto | 6.7 | 4.2 | SH 144 | |
| Zacatecas | Loreto | San Marcos | 9.2 | 5.7 | SH 186 – La Alqueria, Pedregoso | |
1.000 mi = 1.609 km; 1.000 km = 0.621 mi: Incomplete access
