= Mexican Federal Highway 49 =

Highway in Mexico

Federal Highway 49
- Carretera federal 49

Route information
- Maintained by Secretariat of Infrastructure, Communications and Transportation
- Length: 689.68 km (428.55 mi)

North segment
- Length: 526.7 km (327.3 mi)
- North end: Fed. 45 / Fed. 45D in Ciudad Jiménez
- Major intersections: Fed. 49D in San Rafael, Chihuahua Fed. 49D in Bermejillo, Chihuahua; Fed. 40D east of La Torreña; Fed. 40 in Gómez Palacio; Fed. 34 near Pedriceña Fed. 40 in Cuencamé
- South end: Fed. 45 in Las Palmas, Zacatecas

South segment
- Length: 162.98 km (101.27 mi)
- North end: Fed. 45 in Las Arcinas
- Major intersections: Fed. 63 in Mexquitic
- South end: San Luis Potosí, San Luis Potosí

Location
- Country: Mexico

Highway system
- Mexican Federal Highways; List; Autopistas
| ← Fed. 45 | → Fed. 51 |

Federal Highway 49 ( La Carretera Federal 49 ) (Fed. 49) is a toll-free (libre) part of the federal highways corridors of Mexico. The highway runs northwest-southeast in the western regions of the Mexican Plateau.

Fed. 49 has two separate improved segments: The first segment runs from Ciudad Jiménez, Chihuahua to just northwest of Fresnillo, Zacatecas. The highway is co-signed with Fed. 40 for 104.6 km (65 mi) from Gómez Palacio to Cuencamé.

The second segment runs from Las Arcinas, Zacatecas to San Luis Potosí, San Luis Potosí.
