= Mexican Federal Highway 45D =

Toll highway in Mexico

Federal Highway 45D
- Carretera federal 45D

Route information
- Maintained by Secretariat of Communications and Transportation

Location
- Country: Mexico

Highway system
- Mexican Federal Highways; List; Autopistas

Federal Highway 45D (Spanish: Carretera Federal 45D, Fed. 45D) is a toll road alternative to the paralleling Fed. 45. Eleven separate tolled segments exist of Fed. 45D between Querétaro City and Villa Ahumada in Chihuahua, between Chihuahua City and Ciudad Juárez.

== Querétaro-Irapuato ==
Autopista Querétaro-Irapuato
- Location: Fed. 45 / Fed. 57 in Querétaro City to Fed. 90 in Irapuato, Guanajuato
- Length: 104.7 km (65.1 mi)

The toll road between Querétaro and Irapuato is the oldest to bear the Fed. 45D designation, opening on February 12, 1962. It is operated by Caminos y Puentes Federales, which charges cars 136 pesos to travel the full length of Fed. 45D. East of Salamanca, it meets an interchange that marks the northern terminus of Fed. 43D (Morelia-Salamanca) and the southern terminus of the Salamanca-León highway, also designated Fed. 45D.

== Salamanca-León ==
Autopista Salamanca–León
- Location: Fed. 45D / Fed. 43D in Cerro Gordo, Guanajuato to León, Guanajuato
- Length: 79 km (49 mi)

The Salamanca-León highway picks up where Fed. 43D leaves off at the interchange with the Querétaro-Irapuato highway east of Salamanca; a toll plaza, called Cerro Gordo, sits in the northeast corner of the interchange. It proceeds northwest past a toll plaza at Mendoza and toward another interchange with Fed. 45 north of the city of Irapuato, quickly followed by another with the city's Northwest Bypass, Fed. 20D. A portion of the routing of Fed. 43D here coincides with that originally built for Fed. I-20D. After this, the road veers back northwest, with one partially built spur immediately preceding the Puerta Interior toll plaza, before ending at Fed. 45D on the southeast edge of the León metro. A connection into the León metropolitan street system at Bulevar Delta was under construction and was opened in early 2017.

The 79-kilometre (49 mi) Salamanca-León segment formally opened on September 21, 2015 with a dedication ceremony by President Enrique Peña Nieto. It cost 3.45 billion pesos and is estimated to carry 9,450 cars a day. It is maintained by Grupo México subsidiary Concesionaria Infraestructura del Bajío, S.A. de C.V. and costs cars 43 pesos to drive.

Segments of the Salamanca-León highway to be built include urban access to León and a spur to Puerta Interior.

== León-Aguascalientes ==
Autopista León–Aguascalientes
- Location: Fed. 45 in León, Guanajuato to Fed. 45 in Encarnación de Díaz, Jalisco
- Length: 129.38 km (80.39 mi)

The Autopista León-Aguascalientes, which opened on September 30, 1992, is operated by Red de Carreteras de Occidente (RCO) along with other highways in the Bajío region. RCO charges a toll of 267 peso for cars to use the entirety of the road.

== Cuauhtémoc-Osiris ==
Autopista Cuauhtémoc-Osiris
- Location: Fed. 45 in Cosío, Aguascalientes to Fed. 45 / SH 45D (Libramiento Noreste de Zacatecas) in Guadalupe, Zacatecas
- Length: 58.11 km (36.11 mi)

The only segment in Zacatecas not operated by the state government, CAPUFE charges 38 pesos to use the highway from Cuauhtémoc to Osiris, which provides much of the route between Aguascalientes and Zacatecas City.

== Libramiento de Víctor Rosales ==
Libramiento de Víctor Rosales
- Location: Fed. 45 in Víctor Rosales to Fed. 45 in Enrique Estrada
- Length: 12.2 km (7.6 mi)

The Libramiento de Víctor Rosales, which opened on October 8, 1991, bypasses the towns of Víctor Rosales and Enrique Estrada. Its concession is held by Infraestructura Concesionada de Irapuato, S.A. de C.V., but operations are managed by the state government, which charges a toll of 20 pesos.

== Libramiento de Fresnillo ==
Libramiento de Fresnillo
- Location: Fed. 45 south of Fresnillo to Fed. 45 north of Fresnillo
- Length: 20.05 km (12.46 mi)

The bypass of Fresnillo is owned and operated by the government of Zacatecas, with a toll of 35 pesos for cars; it opened on March 8, 1993.

== Autopista Jiménez-Camargo ==
Autopista Jiménez-Camargo
- Location: Fed. 45 / Fed. 49 in Jiménez to Fed. 45 / SH 30 / SH 69 in Camargo
- Length: 68.98 km (42.86 mi)

The state government of Chihuahua operates the Autopista Jiménez-Camargo, with its free alternative being Highway 69, and opened on May 15, 1990. A toll of 85 pesos is charged for cars to use the road.

== Autopista Camargo-Delicias ==
Autopista Camargo-Delicias
- Location: Fed. 45 north of Camargo to Fed. 45 in Delicias
- Length: 69.02 km (42.89 mi)

The Autopista Camargo-Delicias is also owned and operated by the Chihuahua state government, which charges cars a toll of 124 pesos over two toll booths, at Altavista and Saucillo.

== Libramiento Oriente de Chihuahua ==
Libramiento Oriente de Chihuahua
- Location: Fed. 45 southeast of Chihuahua City to Fed. 45D near Sacramento
- Length: 42.2 km (26.2 mi)

The Chihuahua Eastern Bypass, providing an alternative to Fed. 45 through Chihuahua City, opened at 12:01 am on April 16, 2015. It ends at Fed. 45D (Chihuahua-Sacramento).

From 2015 to 2017, it was operated by the state government, but it lost the concession with Banobras and, in the midst of a gubernatorial transition, could not hold on. On February 16, 2017, operations were taken over by Banobras, making it Chihuahua's only toll road not administered by the state government. Banobras currently charges 58 pesos to use the road over two toll booths, one at either terminus.

== Chihuahua-Sacramento ==
Autopista Chihuahua-Sacramento
- Location: Fed. 45 near Chihuahua City to Fed. 45 in Sacramento
- Length: 13.18 km (8.19 mi)

The highway from Chihuahua to Sacramento is operated by the state government, with a toll of 62 pesos for cars.

== El Sueco-Villa Ahumada ==
Autopista El Sueco-Villa Ahumada
- Location: Fed. 45 in El Sueco to Fed. 45 in Villa Ahumada
- Length: 83.63 km (51.97 mi)

The Chihuahua state government operates the toll road between El Sueco and Villa Ahumada, the last on northbound Fed. 45 to Ciudad Juárez, and charges a toll of 164 pesos for its use.
