= Luis Moya, Zacatecas =

Luis Moya
- Municipality
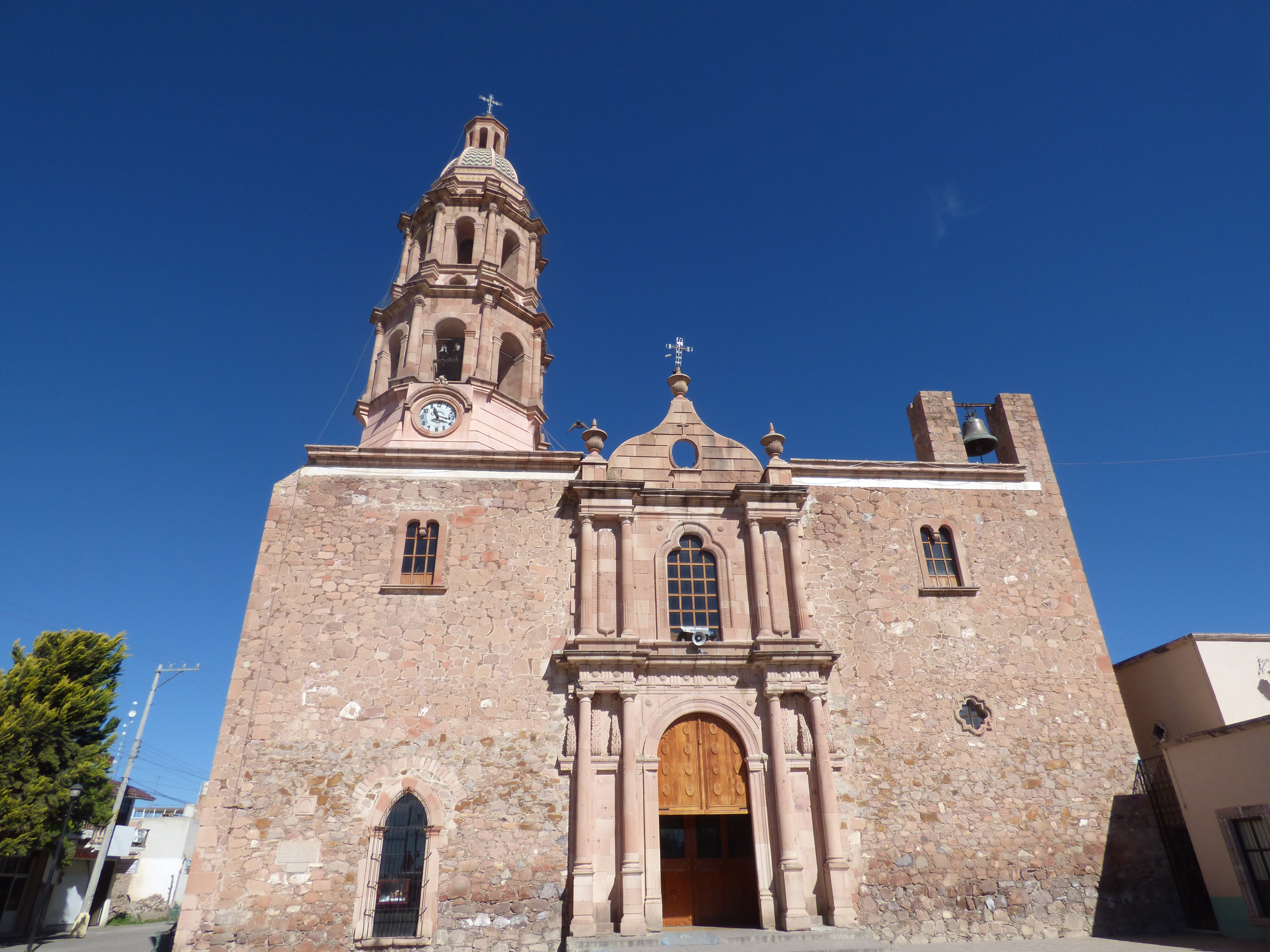
- The Temple of the Sacred Heart of Jesus in the municipal seat of Luis Moya

- Location of Luis Moya Luis Moya (Mexico)
- Coordinates: 22°25′57″N 102°14′55″W
- Country: Mexico
- State: Zacatecas
- Established: 5 February 1857
- Seat: Luis Moya

Government
  - Municipal president: Guadalupe Silva Medina

Area
  - Total: 176.9 km^{2} (68.3 sq mi)
- Elevation (of seat): 1,991 m (6,532 ft)

Population (2020 Census)
  - Total: 13,184
  - Density: 74.53/km^{2} (193.0/sq mi)
  - Seat: 6,983
- Time zone: UTC-6 (Central)
- Postal codes: 98770–98795
- Area code: 458
- Website: Official website

Luis Moya is a municipality in the Mexican state of Zacatecas, located approximately 50 kilometres (31 mi) southeast of the state capital at Zacatecas. It is named after Luis Moya (1855–1911), a colonel in the Mexican Revolution who was posthumously given the rank of brigadier general in 1939.

== Geography ==
The municipality of Luis Moya is located at an elevation between 1,900 and 2,400 metres (6,200–7,900 ft) on the Mexican Plateau in southeastern Zacatecas. It borders the Zacatecan municipalities of Cuauhtémoc to the northwest, Ojocaliente to the northeast, Noria de Ángeles to the east, and Loreto to the southeast. It also borders the municipalities of Cosío, Rincón de Romos, and Tepezalá in the state of Aguascalientes to the south. The municipality covers an area of 176.9 square kilometres (68.3 sq mi) and comprises 0.2% of the state's area.

As of 2009, 73% of the land in Luis Moya is used for agriculture. Matorral (24.7%) and urban areas (1.1%) cover much of the rest of the municipality. Luis Moya is drained by the San Pedro or Aguascalientes River, a tributary of the Río Verde in the Lerma–Santiago river basin. The San Pedro River forms part of the border between Luis Moya and the municipality of Cosío in Aguascalientes.

=== Climate ===
Luis Moya has a temperate semi-arid climate with dry winters. Average temperatures in the municipality range between 16 and 18 °C (61–64 °F), and average annual precipitation ranges between 400 and 500 millimetres (16–20 in).

Climate data for Luis Moya weather station at 22°26′20″N 102°15′06″W, 2017 m above sea level (1981–2010 averages, 1951–2010 extremes)
Month	Jan	Feb	Mar	Apr	May	Jun	Jul	Aug	Sep	Oct	Nov	Dec	Year
Record high °C (°F)	31.0 (87.8)	31.0 (87.8)	33.0 (91.4)	38.0 (100.4)	37.5 (99.5)	38.0 (100.4)	35.0 (95.0)	42.0 (107.6)	35.0 (95.0)	36.0 (96.8)	31.0 (87.8)	32.0 (89.6)	42.0 (107.6)
Mean daily maximum °C (°F)	22.3 (72.1)	23.7 (74.7)	25.8 (78.4)	28.7 (83.7)	30.5 (86.9)	29.3 (84.7)	27.1 (80.8)	27.2 (81.0)	25.9 (78.6)	25.4 (77.7)	23.9 (75.0)	22.9 (73.2)	26.1 (79.0)
Daily mean °C (°F)	11.9 (53.4)	13.1 (55.6)	15.0 (59.0)	17.8 (64.0)	20.3 (68.5)	20.6 (69.1)	19.4 (66.9)	19.3 (66.7)	18.2 (64.8)	16.3 (61.3)	13.5 (56.3)	12.4 (54.3)	16.5 (61.7)
Mean daily minimum °C (°F)	1.5 (34.7)	2.5 (36.5)	4.1 (39.4)	7.0 (44.6)	10.2 (50.4)	11.9 (53.4)	11.8 (53.2)	11.4 (52.5)	10.5 (50.9)	7.1 (44.8)	3.2 (37.8)	2.0 (35.6)	6.9 (44.4)
Record low °C (°F)	−11.0 (12.2)	−7.5 (18.5)	−6.0 (21.2)	−4.0 (24.8)	2.0 (35.6)	2.0 (35.6)	4.0 (39.2)	2.0 (35.6)	0.0 (32.0)	−4.0 (24.8)	−6.0 (21.2)	−7.0 (19.4)	−11.0 (12.2)
Average precipitation mm (inches)	21.8 (0.86)	10.4 (0.41)	1.2 (0.05)	11.2 (0.44)	24.1 (0.95)	84.4 (3.32)	108.3 (4.26)	113.4 (4.46)	68.7 (2.70)	30.5 (1.20)	8.8 (0.35)	5.7 (0.22)	488.5 (19.23)
Average rainy days (≥ 1 mm)	2.0	1.1	0.2	1.6	3.4	7.7	9.6	8.6	5.9	3.0	1.4	1.2	45.7
Source: Servicio Meteorológico Nacional

== History ==
Luis Moya was originally founded as a settlement in 1692 with the name of San Francisco de los Adames.

After Mexican independence, San Francisco de los Adames was part of the partido of Pinos in the state of San Luis Potosí. The Constitution of 1857 formalized the transfer of the municipality of San Francisco de los Adames to Zacatecas. It became a free municipality under the name of San Francisco de los Adame on 19 August 1916. On 9 January 1935, the municipality changed its name in honour of Luis Moya.

== Administration ==
The municipal government of Luis Moya comprises a president, a councillor (Spanish: síndico), and ten trustees (regidores), six elected by relative majority and four by proportional representation. The current president of the municipality is Guadalupe Silva Medina.

== Demographics ==
In the 2020 Census, Luis Moya recorded a population of 13,184 inhabitants living in 3267 households. The 2010 Census recorded a population of 12,234 inhabitants in Luis Moya.

There are 47 inhabited localities in the municipality, of which only the municipal seat, also called Luis Moya, is classified as urban. It recorded a population of 6983 inhabitants in the 2020 Census.

== Economy and infrastructure ==
The economy of Luis Moya is diversified between the primary, secondary and tertiary sectors. Agricultural activities include the farming of dairy cattle, whose production supplies companies such as Lala and Nestlé; and crops such as alfalfa, fodder corn and oats, grapes, and tomatoes. Manufacturing activities include food processing, metalworking and textile production.

Federal Highway 45 runs through the northern part of the municipality, connecting it to the cities of Zacatecas to the northwest and Aguascalientes to the south. A segment of Federal Highway 71 branches off from Highway 45 at the municipal seat of Luis Moya and runs south to San Francisco de los Romo in Aguascalientes. The Ferromex-owned railroad which runs between the cities of Aguascalientes and Zacatecas forms part of the municipality's western border.
