= Mexican Federal Highway 71 =

Highway in Mexico

Federal Highway 71
- Carretera federal 71

Route information
- Maintained by Secretariat of Infrastructure, Communications and Transportation
- Length: 81.50 km (50.64 mi)

North segment
- North end: Fed. 45 in Luis Moya, Zacatecas
- Major intersections: Fed. 22 in San Antonio, Aguascalientes
- South end: Fed. 45 in Providencia, Aguascalientes

South segment
- North end: Fed. 70 in San Felipe, Aguascalientes
- South end: Villa Hidalgo, Jalisco

Location
- Country: Mexico

Highway system
- Mexican Federal Highways; List; Autopistas
← Fed. 70	→ Fed. 72

Federal Highway 71 ( La Carretera Federal 71 ) (Fed. 71) is a free (libre) part of the federal highways corridors () of Mexico. Fed. 71 exists in two separate segments; the first runs from Fed. 45 at Luis Moya, Zacatecas in the north to Providencia, Aguascalientes in the south. The second segment runs from San Felipe, Aguascalientes in the north to Villa Hidalgo, Jalisco in the south. The highway continues on from Villa Hidalgo to Teocaltiche as Jal 211.
