= Mexican Federal Highway 43 =

Highway in Mexico

Federal Highway 43
- Carretera federal 43

Route information
- Maintained by Secretariat of Infrastructure, Communications and Transportation
- Length: 107.95 km (67.08 mi)

Major junctions
- North end: Fed. 45 in Salamanca
- Fed. 43D west of Yuriria Fed. 43D southwest of Yuriria; Fed. 43D south of Cuitzeo; Fed. 43D in San Juan Benito Juárez; Fed. 15D near San Juan Benito Juárez Fed. 120 in San José, Michoacán
- South end: Morelia, Michoacán

Location
- Country: Mexico

Highway system
- Mexican Federal Highways; List; Autopistas
← Fed. 41	→ Fed. 44

Federal Highway 43 (Carretera Federal 43) (Fed. 43) is a toll-free (libre) part of the federal highways corridors (los corredores carreteros federales) of Mexico.

Fed. 43 connects the city of Salamanca, Guanajuato in the north to the capital of Michoacán, Morelia in the south. Near Morelia it begins as a highway to cross the bridge over Lake Cuitzeo, just north of the intersection of Fed. 15. From there it is a narrow road and is 2 lanes wide in places. The highway connects the cities of Cuitzeo, Moroleón, Uriangato, and Valle de Santiago. A motorway fee is now charged.
