= Mexican Federal Highway 43D =

Toll highway in Mexico

Federal Highway 43D
- Carretera federal 43D
- Autopista Morelia-Salamanca

Route information
- Maintained by Autopista Morelia-Salamanca, S.A. de C.V.
- Length: 107.95 km (67.08 mi)

Major junctions
- South end: Fed. 15D / Fed. 43 in Cuitzeo, Michoacán
- North end: Fed. 45 east of Salamanca, Guanajuato, Fed. 45D at Cerro Gordo, Guanajuato

Location
- Country: Mexico

Highway system
- Mexican Federal Highways; List; Autopistas

Federal Highway 43D is a toll highway connecting the cities of Morelia, Michoacán and Salamanca, Guanajuato. It is operated by Autopista Morelia-Salamanca, S.A. de C.V. (CAMSSA), and the toll is 93 pesos to travel its 107.95-kilometre (67.08 mi) length.

== Route description ==
=== Morelia-Salamanca ===
Highway 43D begins at a junction with Mexican Federal Highway 15D and Highway 43 at Cuitzeo, north of Morelia. It immediately crosses Lake Cuitzeo, and on the north side is the first toll plaza and an exit to Cuitzeo. Before entering the road crosses over Highway 43, partially crossing over the lake again, before continuing past a second toll plaza, known as La Cinta, and toward its next interchange and toll plaza, offering access to Uriangato via Highway 43. Highway 43D turns northwest after this interchange, skirting Lake Yuriria, before adjusting north. The next interchange and toll plaza are at Valle de Santiago.

The next and last interchange and toll plaza are at Valtierrilla, serving access to the town and Mexican Federal Highway 45 west to Salamanca. The Morelia-Salamanca stretch, with a length of 107.95 kilometres (67.08 mi), then ends at Mexican Federal Highway 45D west of Cerro Gordo; both the intersecting highway and the highway continuing forward (Salamanca-León) are signed Highway 45D.
