= Valtierrilla =

- Valtierrilla
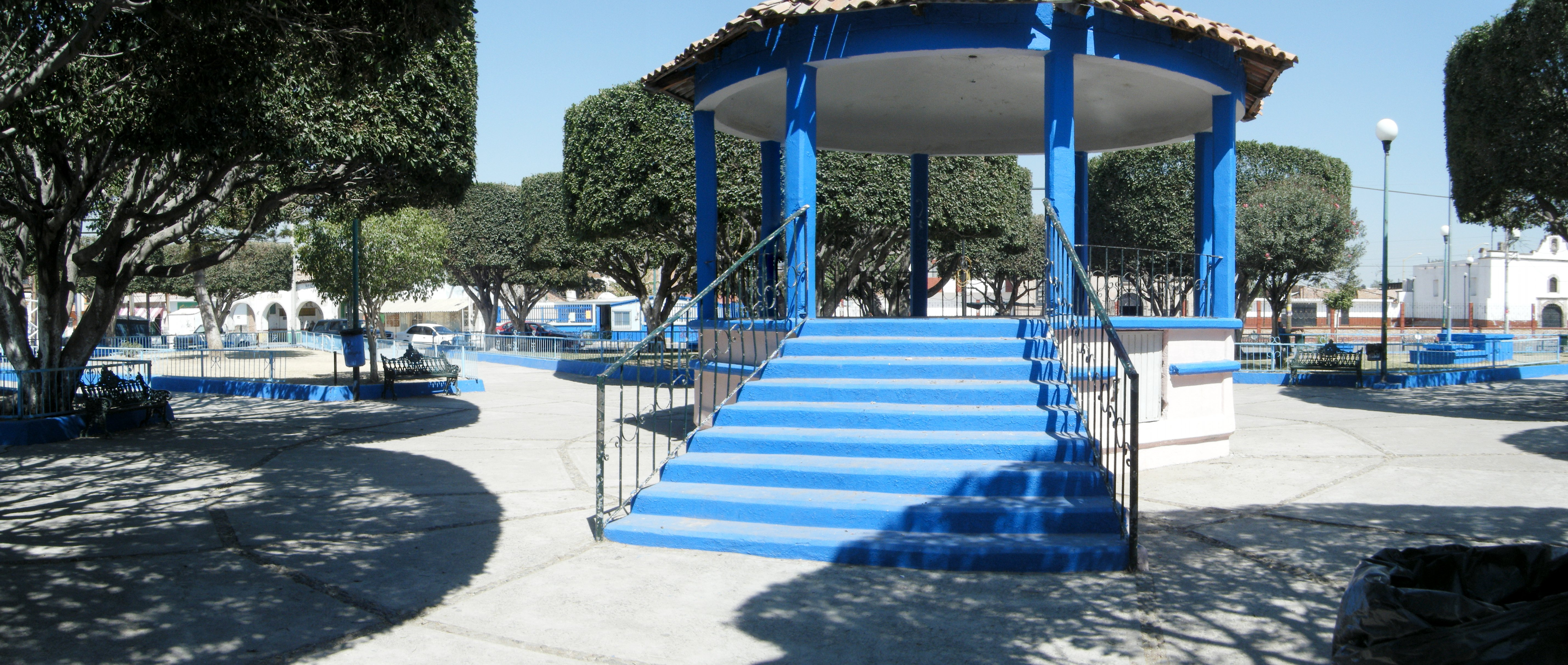
- Kiosk Valtierrilla

- Coordinates: 20°31′52.23″N 101°7′40.28″W
- Founder: 1593 (Don Gaspar de Valdes)
- Ranked 32nd
- Elevation: 1,710 m (5,610 ft)

Population
  - Total: 12,713
- Time zone: CST, (UTC-6)
  - Summer (DST): UTC-6 (CDT)
- Postal code: 36881

Valtierrilla is a village in the Mexican state of Guanajuato, near the city of Salamanca, with a population of 13,200 in 2007. It is considered the world capital of the fruit-bearing cactus known as nopal (Opuntia ficus-indica).

Valtierrilla is a developing industrial area, with a population projected to increase to 20,000 by 2015 and is the largest populated place in the Salamanca town after Salamanca itself.

== Toponymy ==
After the conquest, the settlement was known as Valtierra. Its name derives from the Latin balde (a lot) and terra (earth), meaning "place of much land." In the seventeenth century the estate of Valtierra la Grande (Great Valtierra) was created to the south of Salamanca, so people began to distinguish the settlement by calling it Valtierra la Chica (Small Valtierra). In the early eighteenth century, the inhabitants named the place Santa Cruz Baltierrilla, reflecting the area's evangelization.

In 1918, the name was changed to Andres Delgado, but people associated it with a bandit of the independence period, and it caused problems of location and recognition. The restoration of the previous name was promoted by the parish priest, Father Bernabe Mendez Jesus Montoya. On 9 February 1928, by Decree No.13 of the Congress of Guanajuato, the name became Valtierrilla again.

== Geography ==
Valtierrilla is 8 kilometres (5.0 mi) from the municipal headquarters in Salamanca. It is in the area known as El Bajío (the shoal) near the confluence of the rivers Lerma and Laja. The land area of the town of Valtierrilla is approximately 150 square kilometres (58 mi^{2}). Valtierrilla is located at 20°31′52″N 101°7′40″W, measured from the tower of the parish of Our Lady of Guadalupe. It is 1,710 metres (5,610 ft) above sea level. Within the village there is a rocky outcrop known as Cerro de Comaleros about 1.5 kilometres (0.93 mi) from the community and 1,890 metres (6,200 ft). South of town is the Laja River, which crosses the town from east to west and joins the Lerma River in a place known as Las Adjuntas, 4 kilometres (2.5 mi) from the village.

The climate in the town is warm and semi-arid, with rainfall mainly in the summer and first part of the fall.

== Famous people ==
- Prof. Aurelio Méndez Sánchez, professor, leader in the development of the community in the second half of the twentieth century.
- St. Barnabas Jesus Mendez Montoya, who died in the Cristero War in Mexico. Shot on 5 February 1928 and canonized on 22 May 2000 by Pope John Paul II.
- Father Alberto Campos, priest. Participated in the development of the community in the middle of the twentieth century.
- Sebastian de la Cruz, Valtierrilla's first mayor in 1733. He participated in the construction of the Chapel of the Holy Cross in 1724, asked the Viceroy elect Valtierrilla authorities. He participated in the land dispute over dispossessions carried out by Santamaria Nativitas, and achieved restitution of the land.

== Population ==
In 1754, the population of Valtierrilla was 406 while Salamanca had 1508 inhabitants. By 1900, the Valtierrilla's population grew to 2016 people while Salamanca had risen to 13,583. According to the 2005 census, the county seat of Salamanca accounted for 61.57% of the total municipal population (143,838 inhabitants) and Valtierrilla accounted for 5.19% (12,118 inhabitants). In 2007 a further census reported a population of 13,200.

== History ==
=== Pre-Hispanic times ===
The earliest known human settlements in Valtierrilla are from the Chupicuaro culture and date from the Preclassic or Formative periods between 400 and 200 BCE. Semi-nomadic groups settled on the banks of the Lerma and Laja rivers in scattered villages with an egalitarian social structure. No remains of monuments or stone sculpture have been found, only surface alignments of rocks on top of the Cerro Prieto hill. At the end of 1985, a bridge over the River Laja was built so it could be crossed when the water is high and reach surrounding towns. The cluster of stones was collected for use in the masonry of the bridge, revealing the remains of a stone ceremonial pyramid or stepped structure, with a base about 20 metres (66 ft) in diameter and a projected height of less than 10 metres (33 ft). It was built as a dry stone construction (i.e. using no mortar). Unfortunately, the rocks comprising the structure were removed, rather than preserved. The Chupicuaro abandoned the region for unknown reasons, though semi-nomadic groups in the region probably remained.

The Aztecs probably passed through the area during their migration to the Valley of Mexico around the twelfth or thirteenth century but did not settle in the area.

Before the Spanish arrived there were large groups of Indians, principally Chichimecas, Pames, and Guamares, on the banks of the Lerma and Laja.

=== Colonial Era ===
After the conquest, the Spanish began to make expeditions into the Chichimec region. On 4 May 1593, all titles and relegated residences were set to go to the sons of the conquistadors. Don Gaspar de Váldez took advantage of this situation to register the ranches of Mancera and Valtierra that currently occupy the region in Salamanca, in accordance with the acts of the cabildo. Spanish group requested permission to settle near the river, next to the Estancia de Barahona, away from the existing cities of Celaya and León in 1602. Viceroy Gaspar de Zúñiga, 5th Count of Monterrey authorized their founding the town of Salamanca on 6 August 1602, stipulating that applicants must meet to form a council made up of four council members and two mayors. On New Year's Day of 1603, the town of Salamanca was established.

In the eighteenth century, the intervention of the Royal Audience of New Spain was requested to restore the natives' land in the town of Santa Cruz Valtierrilla. On 12 October 1716, in Mexico City, the town of Santa Maria Nativitas was punished. On 27 October 1716, it was requested that the land be restored and that the lease was paid. This led to discontent among the population so later in 1716, the natives of the town of Santa Cruz Baltierrilla in the jurisdiction of Salamanca, and the governor and other officers of the district Nativitas republic, to separate of the jurisdiction of Salamanca. The life of the people went calmly. In 1724, the first chapel named "Santa Cruz" was built by natives of Valtierrilla so they could celebrate the sacrament of Holy Mass, with the approval and confirmation of Viceroy Juan de Acuña, 2nd Marquis of Casa Fuerte.

Due to land disputes and problems with the leadership of Santa Maria Nativitas, the interest of the population to elect its authorities rose, so that in the year of 1732 a formal petition was made before the royal audience of New Spain, in the council of Indians, so that the natives of Santa Cruz Valtierrilla could govern independently. The response of the viceroy Juan de Acuña was positive, stating in a document dated in 1733 that "The viceroy in accordance with the Law grants to the natives of Valtierrilla, jurisdiction of Salamanca, license to elect mayor and regidor without impediment of the justice of the party. Santa Cruz Valtierrilla, Salamanca". So in 1734 the first election of mayor of Valtierrilla was held, resulting in Sebastián de la Cruz. The problem of lands continued through the years between the natives of Valtierrilla who demanded their rights and the greed of some inhabitants of the town of Nativitas and Salamanca, and always having as official request the Royal Audience of New Spain in their council of lands, again in 1797 a land dispute occurred, due to a dispossession suffered by the natives of a part of the ranch of Santa Catarina put in the possession of captain José del Rivero, this problem was extended and the following year, the lands were restored to the natives of Valtierrilla.

In the year of 1807 Don Nicolás Ángel López and Don Pedro Nolazco, mayor and regidor of the town of Santa Cruz Baltierrilla, filed a complaint that demanded with excess the tax of those registered in the town. So they attached a list of tributary Indians and list of all the misunderstandings that there are in the testimony of the registration. This non-compliance of the Indians lead to support of the independence movement because of the exaggerated taxes. But there is a significant fact: between 1808 and 1814, the available documentation records the constant donations and loans of a large number of indigenous communities of practically the entire vice-royalty to support the war of Spain with France. The registries show names and names of communities that offer their contributions, among them "Baltierrilla".

=== Independence ===
The inhabitants of the town of Valtierrilla supported the independence movement initiated by Miguel Hidalgo. Andres Delgado El giro and a group of more than two hundred men on horseback carried out attacks in the region, establishing a barracks in the community of Valtierrilla, where in June 1818 they captured Joaquin Cortes, captain of the infantry regiment, being kept for around fifteen days before he slipped from the rebels. In that same year, Andrés Delgado was apprehended and shot.

An epidemic of typhus caused many deaths in Valtierrilla was in 1838, so disastrous that many people were buried in the chapel courtyard.

In 1858, following the coup of Ignacio Comonfort in late 1857, the president of the Supreme Court, Benito Juárez, assumed executive authority to provide security to the state. The governor of Guanajuato supported him like the Liberal army, called the Coalition, commanded by General Anastasio Parrodi. The Conservative army, commanded by General Luis G. Osollo, General Miguel Miramon, and Tomas Mejia, attacked. The forces met in Valtierrilla on a very broad front. The most bitter fighting took place on the road where the bridge crossed the Ugly brook. Colonel José María Calderón was killed there, a brilliant soldier, who at that time fighting against his former classmates from the military college, Miramon and Osollo. It was the first of the three great battles of the War of Reform, on 10 March 1858.

In 1871, the telegraph was installed from Salamanca to Valle de Santiago and thence to the south of the state.

=== Recent times ===
In the early twentieth century, the state promoted primary education, designating "model schools" inaugurated in 1903 in Valtierrilla. Originally they stood at the corner of Benito Juarez Street and Basque Quiroga and later moved to the street Manuel Doblado. There were separate schools for boys and girls.

In 1918 the name was changed from Santa Cruz Valtierrilla to Andres Delgado, after the guerrilla Valtierrilla native and celebrated 100 years after his death. In 1928, however, it was restored to Valtierrilla.

Mid-year in 1918 an epidemic of cholera morbus which had hit much of the country, arrived in Valtierrilla.

In 1922 the Valtierrilla delegate, supported by Jesús Méndez Montoya, asked the state to secede from the township of Salamanca. The mayor argued that the request was not feasible, as it was a village of Indians, ignorant and unrelated to any office. The request failed.

1926: Pénjamo, Leon and other populations of the entity the Cristero movement reached their peak. On 19 February 1928 federal forces entered Valtierrilla from the south. About seven that morning, they shot Jesus Mendez Montoya. He was later sainted.

By presidential order dated 19 September 1951, published in the Official Journal of the Federation on 18 April 1952 and executed on 15 June 1952, an ejido granted lands to be "Valtierrilla", an area of 250.40 ha, including the school parcel. In fact the recipients were 47 farmers.

On 27 April 1977, requested the expropriation of an area of 7.1530 ha intended to expand the refinery Antonio M. Love, the ejido Valtierrilla.

== Health and infrastructure ==
For decades, Valtierrilla has had a health center located in Revolution Square. The center reports directly to the Ministry of Health, and is now known as Medical Unit Primary Health Care (UMAPS). It currently has four doctors, one medical social service intern and 10 nurses. The service is open daily from 8am to 8pm, and attends to everyone, whether or not in receipt of social security (e.g., Seguro Popular, IMSS, etc.). This hospital was built with the support of the city of Salamanca to cover services in the health sector in all the villages located outside the urban area not only Valtierrilla.

== Educational infrastructure ==
In the Community of Valtierrilla there are the following educational institutions:

- Three preschool campuses: Tomasa Esteves, Jaime Torres Bodet, Octavio Gómez Leal and a new creation.
- Five schools of primary education; Mariano Matamoros, Guadalupe Victoria, 20 November, Joan of Asbaje, Agustín Melgar.
- Two basic high schools: Secondary School No. 23 Tele and High School "Aurelio Sanchez Mendez."
- A senior high school education: bachelor's and Video Training Center UNICATT State Government.

== Exponopal ==
Since 2005 an exhibition, "Exponopal", featuring the nopal cactus, has been held each year at the beginning of February, with support from the town of Salamanca. The Expo brings together producers of nopal products. These come from different parts of the state and other parts of Mexico. Exhibitors display nopal products such as stew, cactus tortillas, shampoo, jelly, jam, skin creams, juices, candy, and cactus fruit covered with almonds and chocolate.

== Sports ==
Football has been played in Valtierrilla for 70 years.

Weightlifting is a discipline practiced today within the community at state level. Edith Montserrat Silva Vazquez has been Pan-American champion and has won gold medals in three successive national competitions. Also Jorge "Conejo" Godoy, gold medalist in the national Olympics in his class.

== Landmarks ==
- The Main Square of the Revolution.
- Chapel of Santa Cruz, built by the townspeople to celebrate Mass, approved by the Viceroy in 1724.
- Church of the Sacred Heart of Jesus.
- Church of Our Lady of Guadalupe.

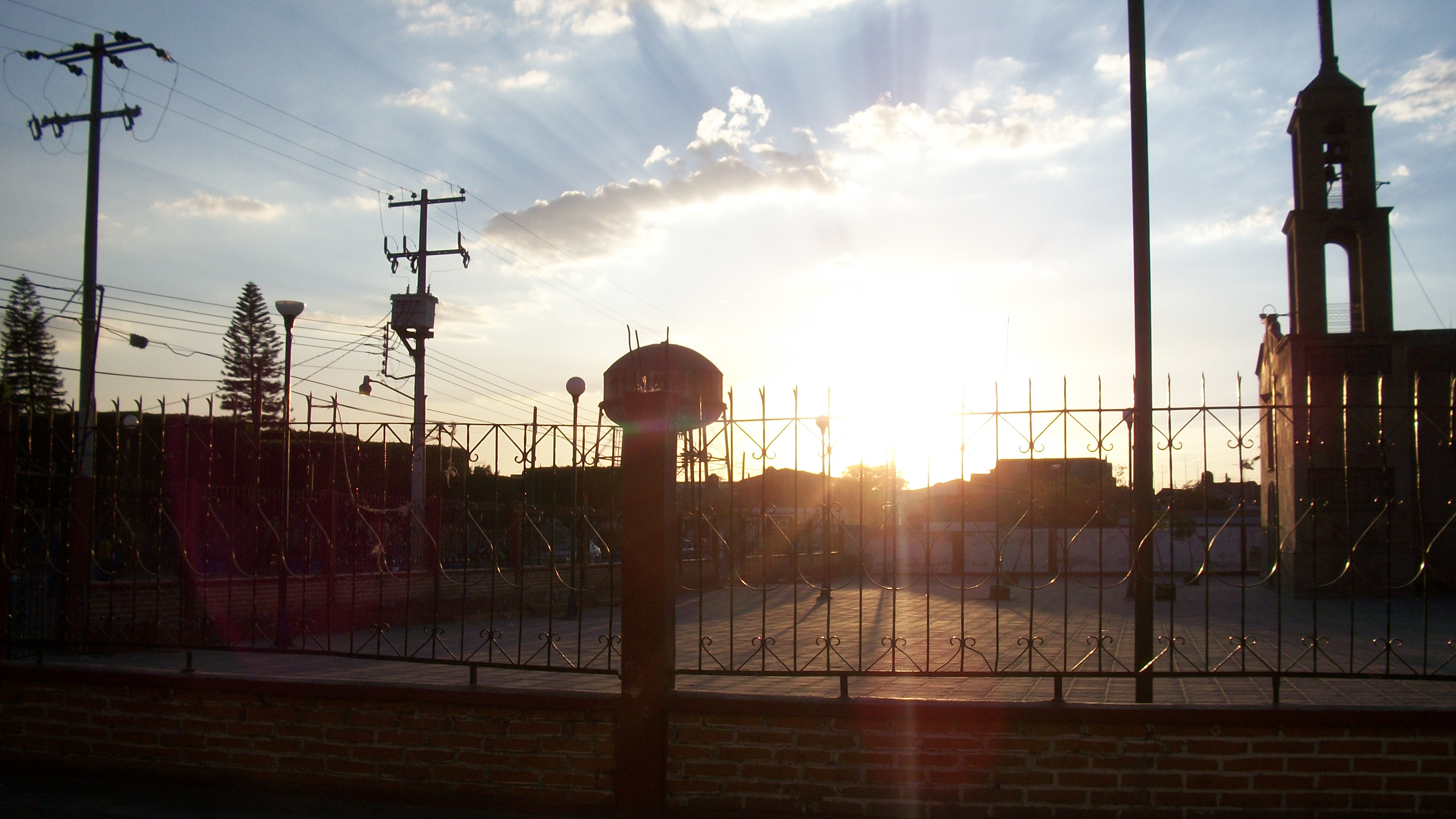
Church of Our Lady of Guadalupe, Valtierrilla

- Pyramid of stone or ceremonial center on Comaleros hill.

== Politics and government ==
The community belongs to the thirteenth local electoral district, and the eighth federal electoral district. In the 2006 federal election, there were 8,078 registered voters.

Salamanca City Council is composed of a mayor, two aldermen and 12 councillors. In 1992, Juan Lopez Guerra became the first councillor representing Valtierrilla within the city of Salamanca, in more than four centuries of jurisdiction from Salamanca.

Valtierrilla community is represented today by a municipal delegate. There are four committees of citizen participation for the north, south, eastern and western sectors. On 26 July 2007, the official newspaper of the state government of Guanajuato published an agreement creating the potable water and wastewater system of Valtierrilla ("SAPASVA"), with Guillermo Pérez Hernández as chairman. This was the first such body in the state of Guanajuato.
