= Mexican Federal Highway I-20D =

Toll highway in Mexico

Federal Highway I-20D
- Carretera federal I-20D
- Libramiento de Irapuato; Libramiento Norponiente de Irapuato

Route information
- Maintained by HOATSA
- Length: 29 km (18 mi)
- Existed: March 15, 2011–present

Major junctions
- North end: Fed. 43D to Fed. 45 northwest of Irapuato, Guanajuato
- South end: Fed. 90 south of Irapuato, Guanajuato

Location
- Country: Mexico
- State: Guanajuato

Highway system
- Mexican Federal Highways; List; Autopistas

Federal Highway I-20D (Carretera Federal), known as the Libramiento de Irapuato, is a toll highway that serves as a bypass of the city of Irapuato, Guanajuato. The road is operated by HOATSA, which charges 68 pesos per vehicle to travel the full course of the highway. The road opened on March 15, 2011, at a construction cost of 900 million pesos.

A portion of the course of Federal Highway 43D, the road to León, is shared with Mexico Federal Highway I-20D.
