= Mexican Federal Highway 49D =

Toll highway in Mexico

Federal Highway 49D
- Carretera federal 49D
- Autopista Gómez Palacio-Corralitos; Autopista Jiménez-Torreón

Route information
- Maintained by Secretariat of Communications and Transportation
- Length: 194 km (121 mi)

Major junctions
- North end: Fed. 49 at Ciudad Jiménez, Chihuahua
- South end: Fed. 49 to Fed. 40D at Bermejillo, Durango

Location
- Country: Mexico

Highway system
- Mexican Federal Highways; List; Autopistas

Federal Highway 49D (Carretera Federal 49D) is the designation for toll highways paralleling the free Federal Highway 49. Only one highway is designated 49D, though the 49 number extends beyond the official designation.

The road is operated by Caminos y Puentes Federales, and the total tolls for the entire route is 230 pesos per car charged at its two toll plazas.

== Route description ==
Highway 49D begins at a split with Highway 49 southeast of Ciudad Jiménez, Chihuahua and proceeds southeast to Bermejillo, Durango, with just one interchange, at Bermejillo.

South of town, it is joined by Highway 49 heading into Gómez Palacio. While the primary designation toward Cuéncame, and on the Gómez Palacio beltway, is Mexican Federal Highway 40D, it is co-signed with unique 40/49D signage, as Highways 40 and 49 also share routing for more than 100 kilometers. The 40/49D designation runs past León Guzmán and ends at the Cuéncame toll plaza (as Highways 40 and 49 split as well in that area), with Highway 40D continuing to Durango.
