= Jesús María, Aguascalientes =

City in the Mexican state of Aguascalientes

Jesús María
- City
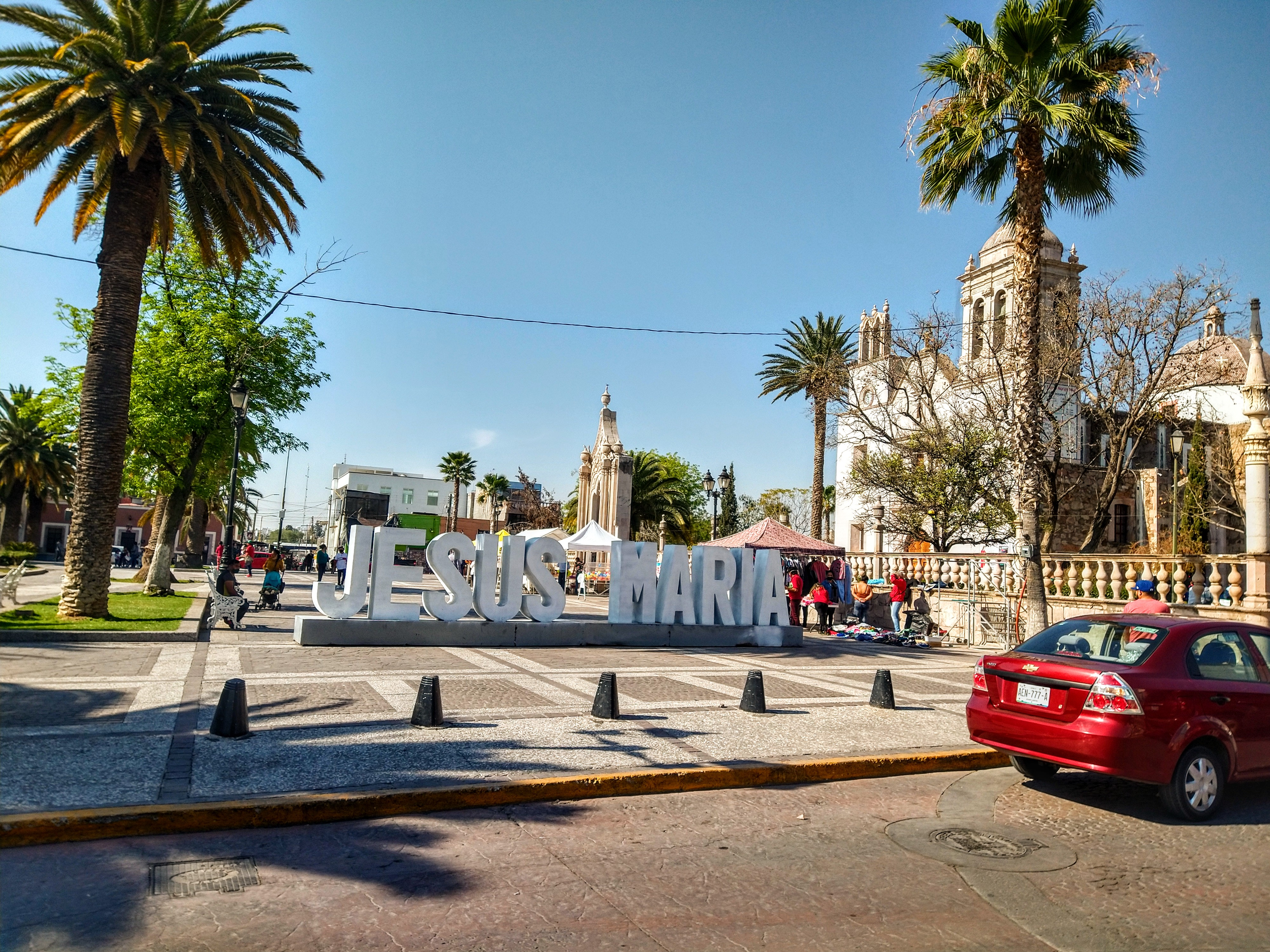

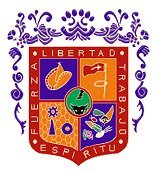
- Coat of arms

- Location in Mexico Jesús María (Mexico)
- Coordinates: 21°58′N 102°21′W
- Country: Mexico
- State: Aguascalientes
- Municipality: Jesús María

Government
  - Federal electoral district: Aguascalientes's 1st

Area
  - Total: 499 km^{2} (193 sq mi)

Population (2010)
  - Total: 43,012

Jesús María is a city in the Mexican state of Aguascalientes. It stands at 21°58′N 102°21′W and serves as the municipal seat of the surrounding municipality of Jesús María.

As of 2010, the city of Jesús María had a population of 43,012, making it the second largest city in the state. It is located so close to the state capital city of Aguascalientes, Aguascalientes, that it has been swallowed by it, rendering it part of the Aguascalientes metropolitan area (pop. 805,666 in 2005), with the function of a suburban area.

It is also the sister city of Queen Creek, Arizona, United States

== Geography ==
=== Climate ===
Climate data for Jesús María (DGE) (1991–2020)
Month	Jan	Feb	Mar	Apr	May	Jun	Jul	Aug	Sep	Oct	Nov	Dec	Year
Record high °C (°F)	29.0 (84.2)	31.0 (87.8)	34.0 (93.2)	39.0 (102.2)	39.5 (103.1)	39.0 (102.2)	35.0 (95.0)	35.0 (95.0)	40.0 (104.0)	36.0 (96.8)	35.5 (95.9)	28.0 (82.4)	40.0 (104.0)
Mean daily maximum °C (°F)	22.5 (72.5)	24.7 (76.5)	27.0 (80.6)	29.6 (85.3)	30.8 (87.4)	29.9 (85.8)	27.5 (81.5)	27.5 (81.5)	26.4 (79.5)	26.1 (79.0)	24.4 (75.9)	22.9 (73.2)	26.6 (79.9)
Daily mean °C (°F)	12.5 (54.5)	14.4 (57.9)	16.5 (61.7)	19.1 (66.4)	21.1 (70.0)	21.8 (71.2)	20.3 (68.5)	20.3 (68.5)	19.4 (66.9)	17.7 (63.9)	15.0 (59.0)	12.7 (54.9)	17.6 (63.7)
Mean daily minimum °C (°F)	2.5 (36.5)	4.0 (39.2)	5.9 (42.6)	8.6 (47.5)	11.3 (52.3)	13.7 (56.7)	13.2 (55.8)	13.1 (55.6)	12.4 (54.3)	9.4 (48.9)	5.5 (41.9)	2.4 (36.3)	8.5 (47.3)
Record low °C (°F)	−8.0 (17.6)	−5.0 (23.0)	−5.0 (23.0)	1.0 (33.8)	0.0 (32.0)	8.0 (46.4)	8.0 (46.4)	5.0 (41.0)	4.0 (39.2)	2.0 (35.6)	−8.0 (17.6)	−8.0 (17.6)	−7.0 (19.4)
Average precipitation mm (inches)	16.2 (0.64)	13.0 (0.51)	6.1 (0.24)	5.0 (0.20)	17.9 (0.70)	94.4 (3.72)	143.3 (5.64)	105.0 (4.13)	92.2 (3.63)	33.2 (1.31)	10.2 (0.40)	12.0 (0.47)	548.5 (21.59)
Average precipitation days (≥ 0.1 mm)	2.2	1.7	0.9	0.9	2.9	8.5	12.5	10.8	9.6	3.7	1.6	1.4	56.7
Source: Servicio Meteorológico Nacional

Climate data for Jesús María (SMN) (1951–2010)
Month	Jan	Feb	Mar	Apr	May	Jun	Jul	Aug	Sep	Oct	Nov	Dec	Year
Record high °C (°F)	33.0 (91.4)	35.0 (95.0)	38.0 (100.4)	37.0 (98.6)	39.5 (103.1)	37.0 (98.6)	34.0 (93.2)	35.0 (95.0)	40.0 (104.0)	37.0 (98.6)	35.5 (95.9)	32.0 (89.6)	40.0 (104.0)
Mean daily maximum °C (°F)	22.8 (73.0)	24.5 (76.1)	27.4 (81.3)	29.6 (85.3)	31.0 (87.8)	29.5 (85.1)	27.1 (80.8)	27.3 (81.1)	26.9 (80.4)	26.0 (78.8)	25.3 (77.5)	22.8 (73.0)	26.7 (80.1)
Daily mean °C (°F)	12.9 (55.2)	14.1 (57.4)	17.0 (62.6)	19.4 (66.9)	21.5 (70.7)	21.8 (71.2)	20.4 (68.7)	20.3 (68.5)	19.8 (67.6)	17.8 (64.0)	15.5 (59.9)	13.5 (56.3)	17.8 (64.0)
Mean daily minimum °C (°F)	2.9 (37.2)	3.7 (38.7)	6.5 (43.7)	9.2 (48.6)	11.9 (53.4)	14.2 (57.6)	13.7 (56.7)	13.3 (55.9)	12.6 (54.7)	9.5 (49.1)	5.6 (42.1)	4.1 (39.4)	8.9 (48.0)
Record low °C (°F)	−7.0 (19.4)	−5.0 (23.0)	−3.0 (26.6)	−0.1 (31.8)	4.5 (40.1)	6.9 (44.4)	7.8 (46.0)	5.0 (41.0)	2.9 (37.2)	1.5 (34.7)	−4.0 (24.8)	−6.0 (21.2)	−7.0 (19.4)
Average precipitation mm (inches)	13.1 (0.52)	6.1 (0.24)	5.6 (0.22)	7.6 (0.30)	17.4 (0.69)	72.6 (2.86)	103.7 (4.08)	105.2 (4.14)	67.3 (2.65)	30.0 (1.18)	13.7 (0.54)	15.2 (0.60)	457.5 (18.01)
Average precipitation days (≥ 0.1 mm)	2.0	1.2	0.5	1.2	2.5	7.8	10.3	10.1	7.5	3.7	1.3	2.2	50.3
Source: Servicio Meteorologico Nacional
