= Emiliano Zapata, Aguascalientes =

Human settlement in Pabellón de Arteaga Municipality, Aguascalientes

Emiliano Zapata
- Town
- Nickname: Emiliano
- Location in Mexico Emiliano Zapata (Mexico)
- Coordinates: 22.10541°N 102.30008°W
- Country: Mexico
- State: Aguascalientes
- Municipality: Pabellón de Arteaga
- Elevation: 1,896 m (6,220 ft)

Population (2020)
  - Total: 3,316
- Postal code: 20665

Colonia Emiliano Zapata or simply Emiliano Zapata, is a community in the municipality of Pabellón de Arteaga, it is located in the coordinates 22.10541°N 102.30008°W, in the western part of the municipality, it has a population of 3,316 inhabitants during the 2020 Mexico Census.
