= Jesús María Municipality =

Municipality in the Mexican state of Aguascalientes

Jesús María
- Municipality
- Coat of arms

- Municipality location in Aguascalientes
- Coordinates: 21°58′N 102°21′W
- Country: Mexico
- State: Aguascalientes
- Founded: 29 October 1833
- Seat: Jesús María
- Largest city: Jesús María

Government
  - Federal electoral district: Aguascalientes's 1st

Area
  - Total: 505 km^{2} (195 sq mi)

Population (2020)
  - Total: 129,929
  - Density: 257/km^{2} (666/sq mi)

Jesús María is a municipality in the Mexican state of Aguascalientes. It stands at 21°58′N 102°21′W. As of 2020, the municipality had a total population of 129,929.

== Geography ==
The municipality has an area of 499.18 km^{2} (192.73 sq mi).

=== Major highways ===
- Mexican Federal Highway 70

=== Adjacent municipalities ===
- San José de Garcia Municipality (north)
- Pabellón de Arteaga Municipality (north)
- San Francisco de los Romo Municipality (east)
- Aguascalientes Municipality (southeast)
- Calvillo Municipality (west)

== Demographics ==
Historical population
Year	Pop.	±%
2010	99,590	—
2015	120,405	+20.9%
2020	129,929	+7.9%

As of 2010, the city of Jesús María, the municipal seat, had a population of 43,012. Other than the city of Jesús María, the municipality had 346 localities, the largest of which (with 2010 populations in parentheses) were: Jesús Gómez Portugal (Margaritas) (11,589), Paseos de Aguascalientes (4,432), Arboledas Paso Blanco (3,313), Corral de Barrancos (3,158), El Llano (2,571), classified as urban, and Maravillas (2,208), Paso Blanco (1,709), Tepetates (1,683), General Ignacio Zaragoza (Venadero) (1,630), Paseos de las Haciendas (1,596), Valladolid (1,411), San Antonio de los Horcones (1,254), Los Arquitos (1,120), Miravalle (1,071), and Ejido la Guayana (Rancho Seco) (1,028), classified as rural.
