= General José María Morelos y Pavón, Aguascalientes =

General José María Morelos y Pavón
- Locality in Mexico
- Location in Mexico
- Coordinates: 21°59′56″N 102°12′7″W
- Country: Mexico
- State: Aguascalientes
- Municipality: Aguascalientes

Population (2010)
  - Total: 2,500
- Time zone: UTC−6 (CST)
  - Summer (DST): UTC−5 (CDT)

General José María Morelos y Pavón is an inhabited rural locality in the state of Aguascalientes. It is located 10 miles northeast of the city of Aguascalientes and has a population of 2,500.
