= Mexican Federal Highway 22 =

Highway in Mexico

Federal Highway 22
- Carretera federal 22

Route information
- Maintained by Secretariat of Infrastructure, Communications and Transportation

Baja California Sur
- East end: Fed. 1 in Ciudad Constitución
- West end: Puerto San Carlos, Baja California Sur

Aguascalientes
- East end: Fed. 25 in Ciénega Grande
- West end: Fed. 45 in Rincón de Romos

Location
- Country: Mexico
- State: Baja California Sur

Highway system
- Mexican Federal Highways; List; Autopistas
← Fed. 20	→ Fed. 23
← Fed. 37	Fed. 39	→ Fed. 40

Federal Highway 22 (Spanish: Carretera Federal 22, Fed. 22) is a toll-free part of the federal highways corridors (Spanish: los corredores carreteros federales) in two improved segments.

Fed. 22 in Baja California Sur runs from Fed. 1 in Ciudad Constitución to Puerto San Carlos. The total length of this segment of the highway is 57 km (35.4 mi).

Fed. 22 in Aguascalientes runs from Fed. 45 in Rincón de Romos to Fed. 25 in Ciénega Grande. The total length of this segment of the highway is 36 km (22.37 mi).
