= Mexican Federal Highway 34 =

Highway in Mexico

Federal Highway 34
- Carretera federal 34

Route information
- Maintained by Secretariat of Communications and Transportation
- Length: 98 km (61 mi)

Major junctions
- East end: Fed. 40 in Pedriceña
- West end: Fed. 45 in Rodeo, Durango

Location
- Country: Mexico
- State: Durango

Highway system
- Mexican Federal Highways; List; Autopistas; State Highways in Durango
← Fed. 33	→ Fed. 35

Federal Highway 34 (Spanish: Carretera Federal 34, Fed. 34), called locally Carretera Rodeo-Nazas and Carretera Nazas-Cuatillos), is a free part of the federal highways corridors (Spanish: los corredores carreteros federales) of Mexico. The highway starts in the west about 5 km (3.1 mi) south of Rodeo, Durango along Fed. 45 and travels east then northeast towards the city of Nazas. From Nazas, the highway travels east until just before it reaches the western portion of Presa Francisco Zarco lake; from there, the highway travels southeast, traversing Fed. 40 and ending in Pedriceña. The total distance of Fed. 34 is 98 km (61 mi).
