= Mexican Federal Highway 23 =

Highway in Mexico

Federal Highway 23
- Carretera federal 23

Route information
- Maintained by Secretariat of Infrastructure, Communications and Transportation

Guanacevi-Jocotepec
- Length: 1,290 km (800 mi)
- North end: Guanacevi, Durango
- Major intersections: Fed. 45in Canatlan Fed. 44in San Juan de Peyotan; Fed. 45in Fresnillo Fed. 15 / Fed. 15D / Fed. 54 / Fed. 54D in Guadalajara

Section 2
- South end: Fed. 15 in Jocotepec

Location
- Country: Mexico

Highway system
- Mexican Federal Highways; List; Autopistas
| ← Fed. 22 | → Fed. 24 |

Federal Highway 23 (Spanish: Carretera Federal 23, Fed. 23) is a toll-free part of the federal highway corridors (Spanish: los corredores carreteros federales).

== Route ==
The highway starts in the north in Guanacevi, Durango, and ends to the south in Jocotepec, Jalisco.

Fed. 23 intersects multiple federal highways along its route, such as: Fed. 45 north of Victoria de Durango, Fed. 44 near San Juan de Peyotan, NAY, Fed. 15, Fed. 54 and Fed. 70 in Guadalajara.
