= Mexican Federal Highway 51 =

Highway in Mexico

Federal Highway 51
- Carretera federal 51

Route information
- Maintained by Secretariat of Infrastructure, Communications and Transportation
- Length: 708.46 km (440.22 mi)

North segment
- Length: 309.41 km (192.26 mi)
- North end: Ojuelos de Jalisco
- South end: Maravatío

South segment
- Length: 399.05 km (247.96 mi)
- North end: Zitácuaro
- South end: Iguala

Location
- Country: Mexico

Highway system
- Mexican Federal Highways; List; Autopistas
← Fed. 49	→ Fed. 52

Federal Highway 51 (Carretera Federal 51) (Fed. 51) is a toll-free (libre) part of the federal highways corridors (los corredores carreteros federales) of Mexico. Fed. 51 has two segments: the first segment run from Ojuelos de Jalisco to Maravatío, Michoacán. The length of the first segment is 309.41 km (192.26 mi). The second segment runs from Zitácuaro, Michoacán to Iguala, Guerrero. The length of the second segment is 399.05 km (247.96 mi).
