= General Enrique Estrada =

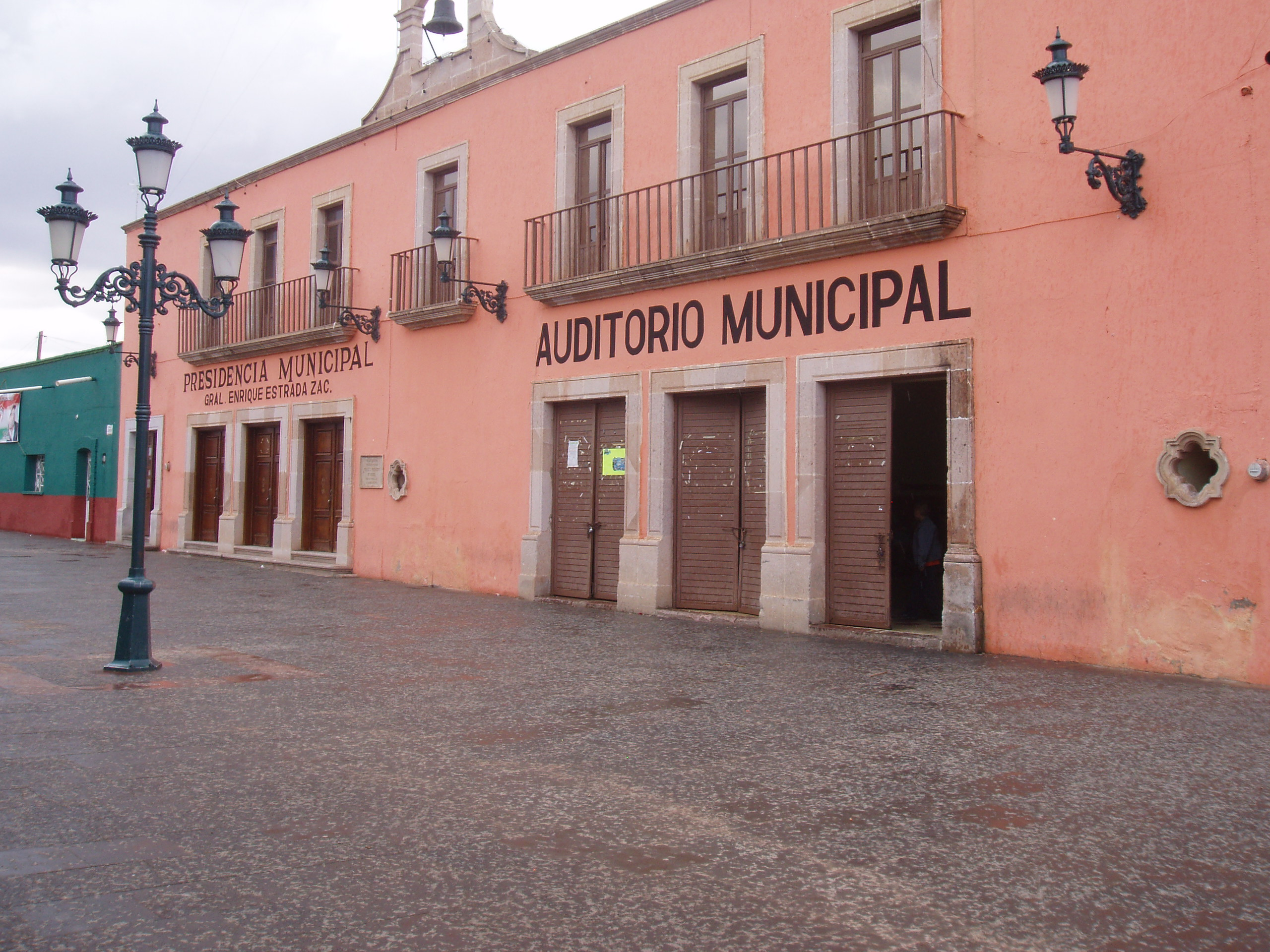

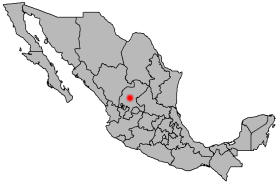

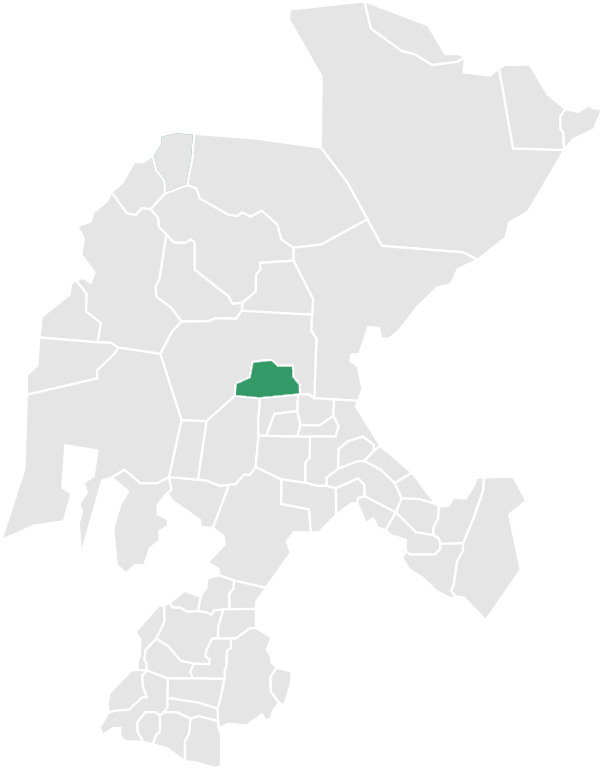
- Location of municipality in Zacatecas
- Coordinates: 23°00′N 102°44′W
- Country: Mexico
- State: Zacatecas
- Municipality: General Enrique Estrada
- Founded: September 25, 1725

Government
  - Mayor: Sabino Dorado Rodríguez
- Elevation: 2,150 m (7,050 ft)

Population (2005)
  - Total: 3,436
  - Municipality: 6,644
- Time zone: UTC-6 (Central (US Central))
- Postal code: 98560
- Area code: 478
- Website: www.enriqueestrada.gob.mx

General Enrique Estrada is a city and municipality in the Mexican state of Zacatecas. It was named for General Enrique Estrada.
