= Santa Bárbara, Durango =

Location in Durango, Mexico

Coordinates: 26°48′N 105°49′W

Santa Bárbara occupies 424,200 square kilometers or 0.17% of the state of Durango, in Mexico. It was initially a base for Spanish exploration during the 16th Century. It is also the location of the coldest recorded temperature in Mexico at -32 degrees Celsius (−25.6 °F) in 1999. Santa Bárbara has a population of 30.
