= Salamanca, Guanajuato =

Salamanca Xidoo "Place of Tepetate"
- City and municipality
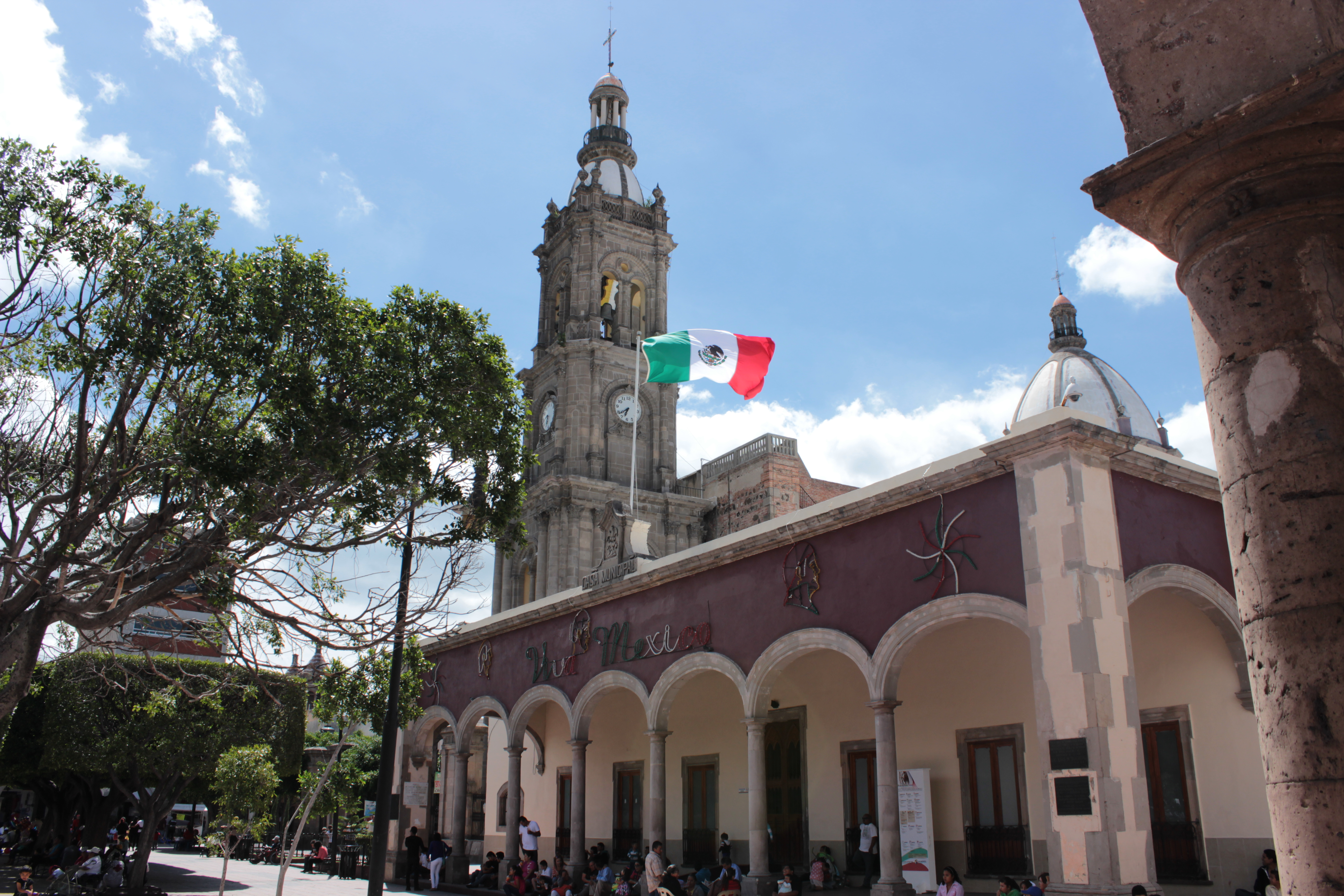
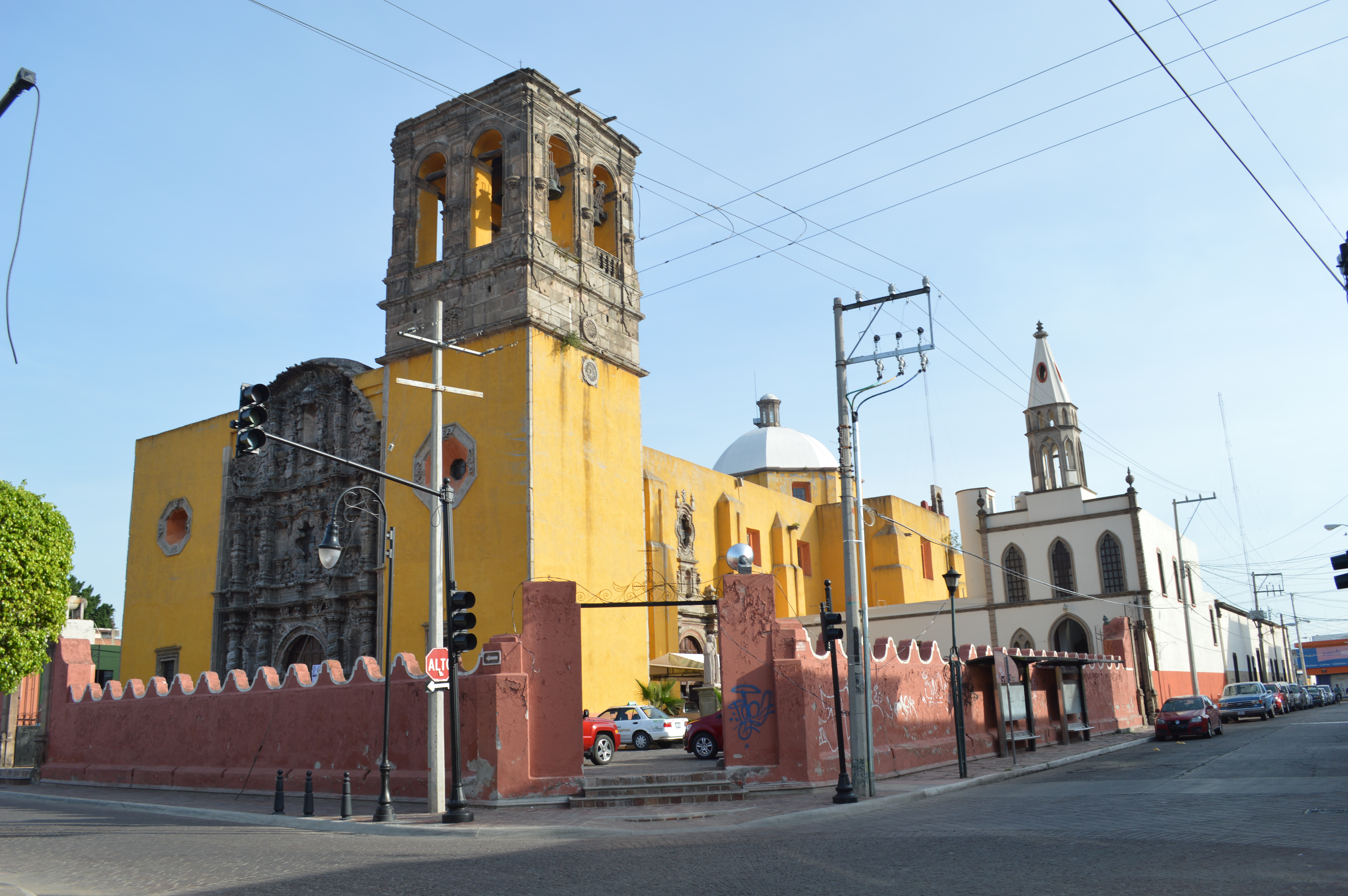
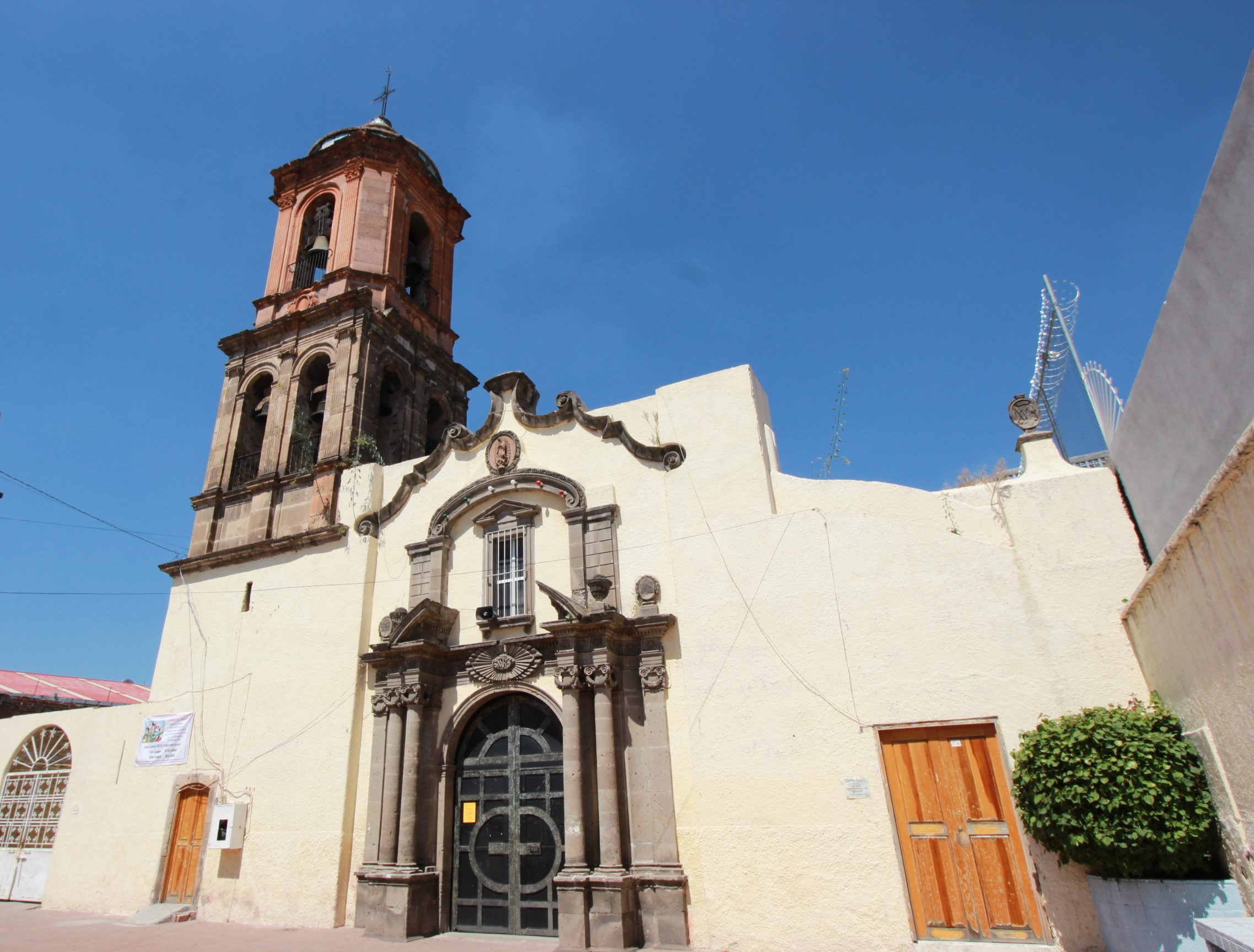
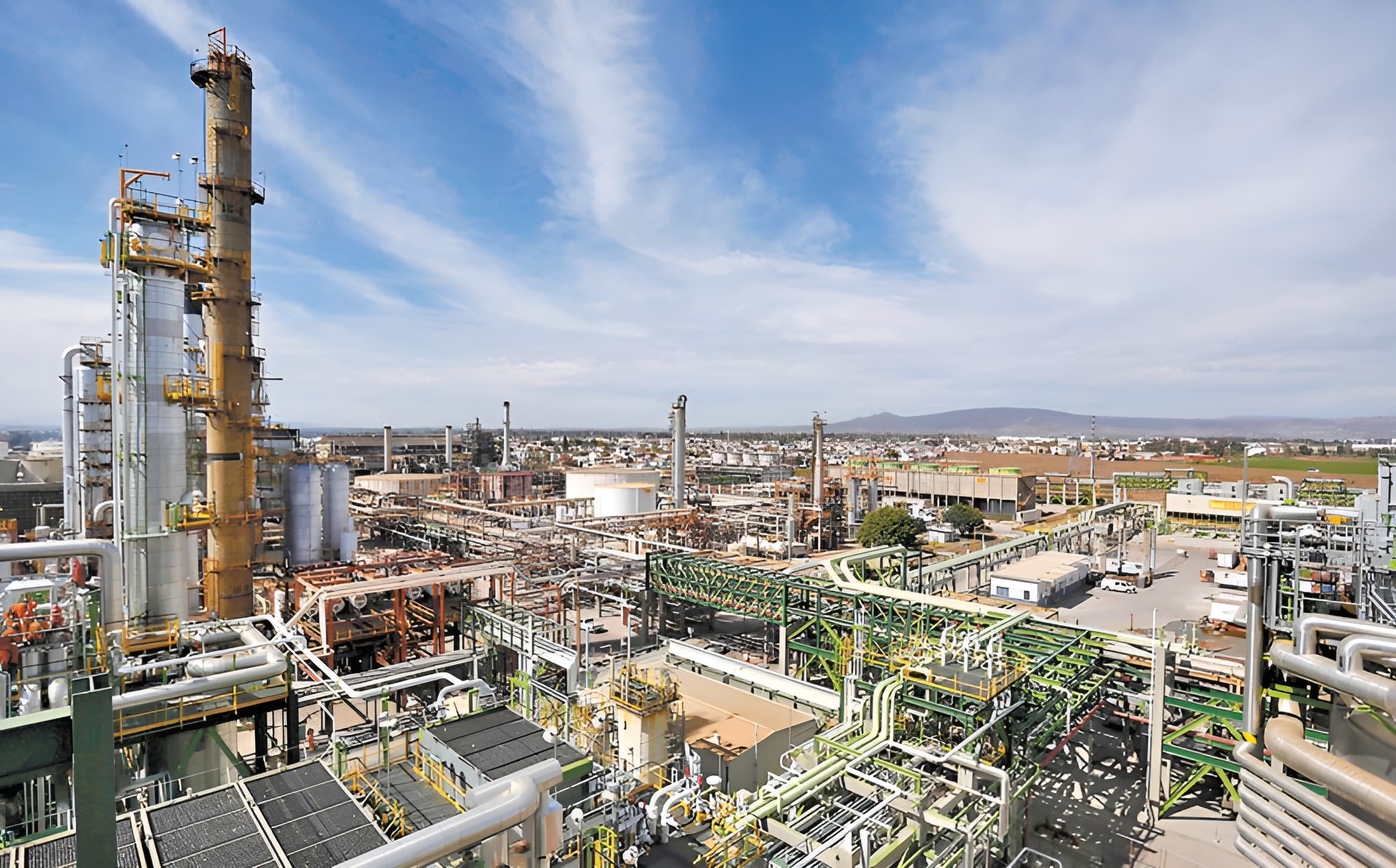
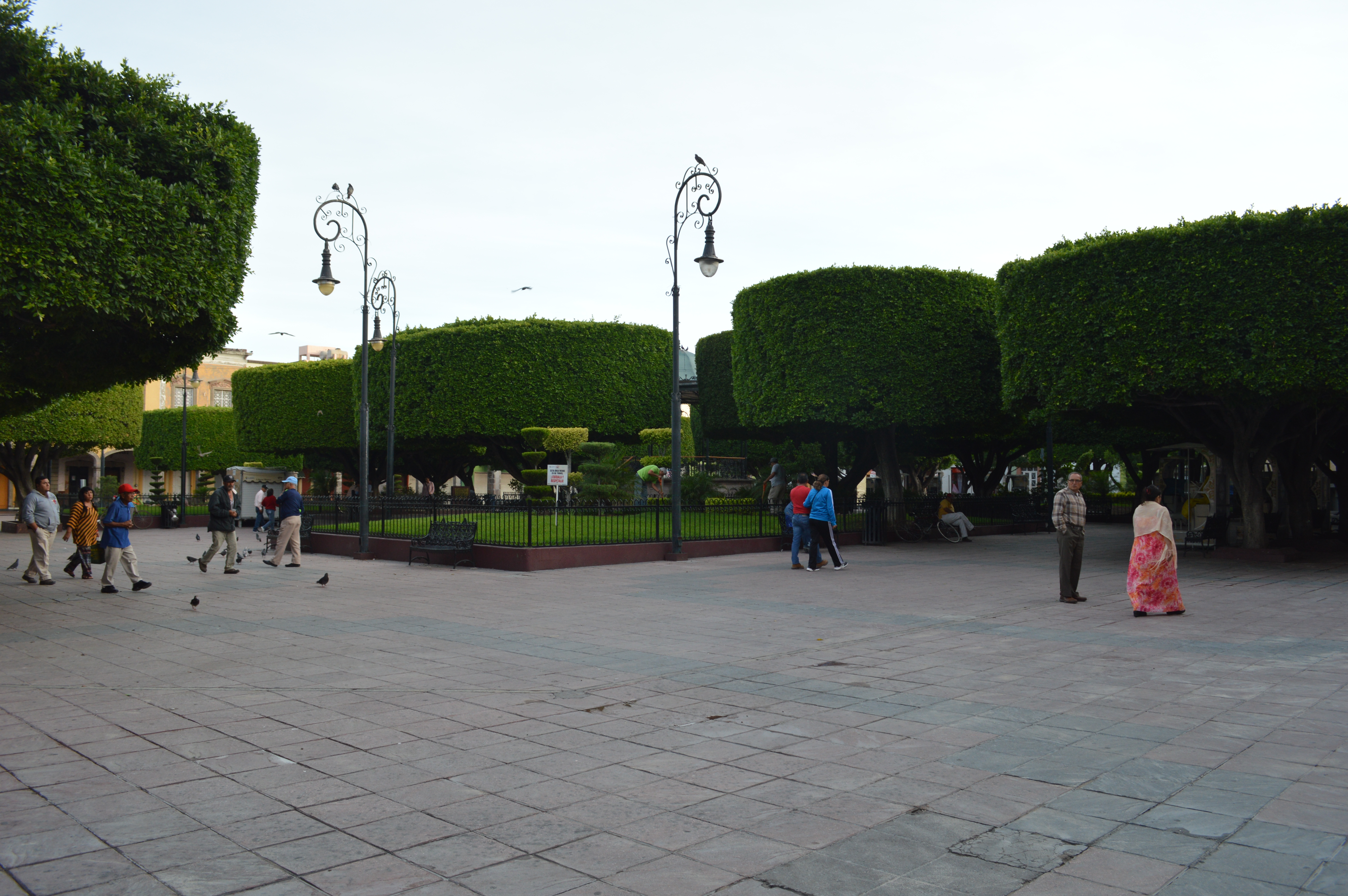
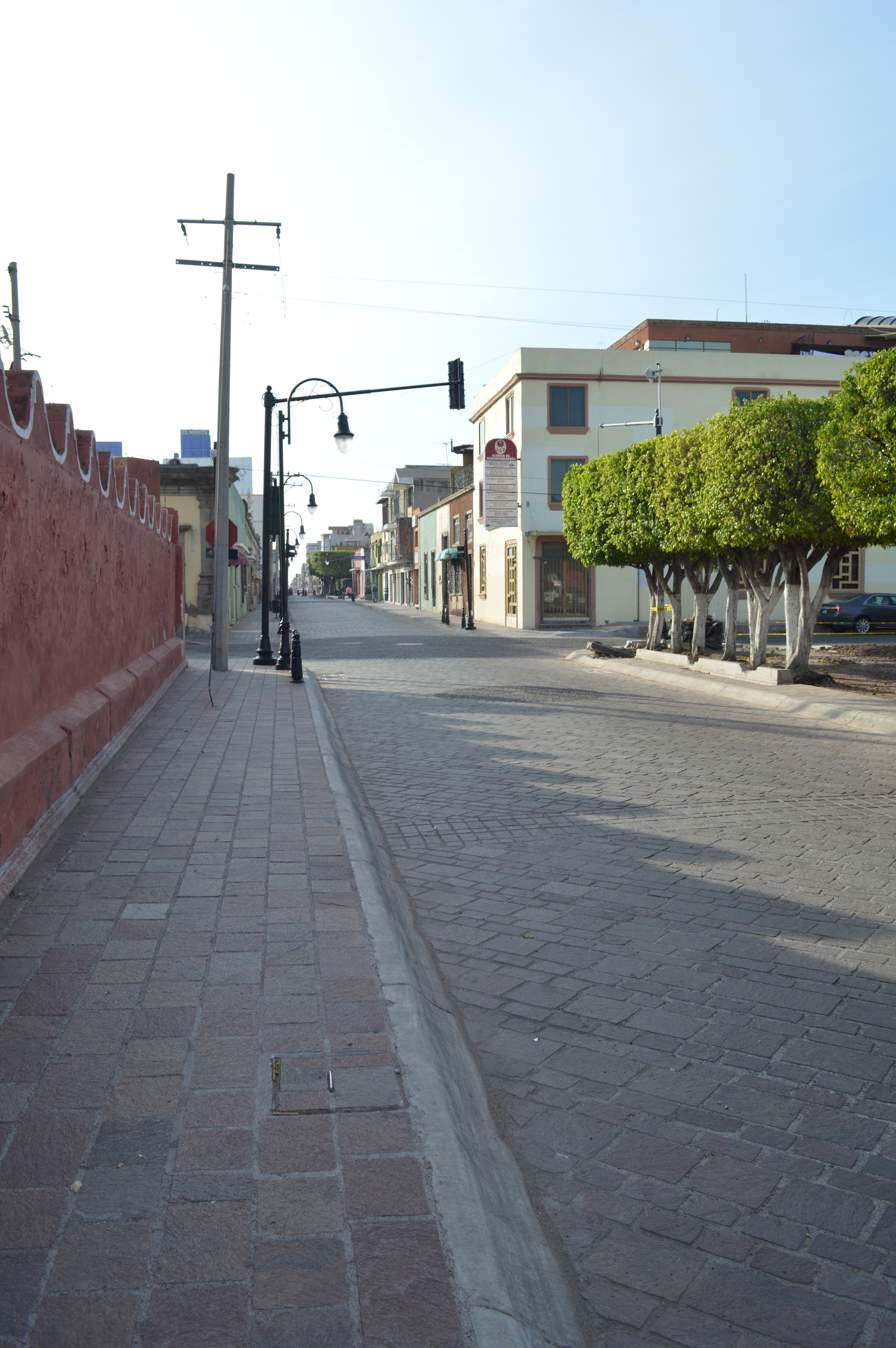
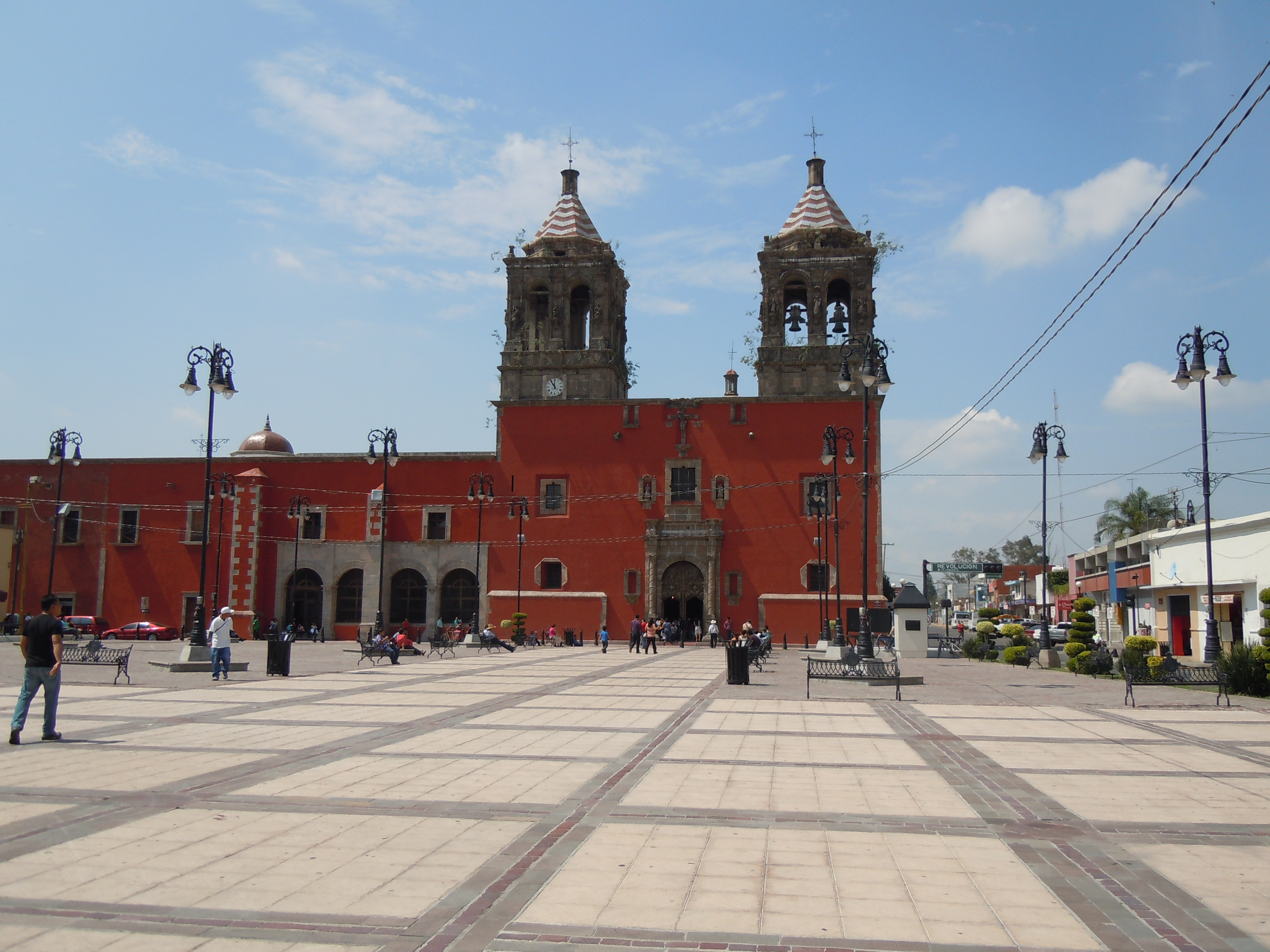
- Clockwise from upper left: Presidencia Municipal, Parroquia Antigua, Santuario de Guadalupe, Refinería de Salamanca, Jardin de Salamanca, Ignacio Allende, and the Church of San Agustín.

- Coat of arms
- Nickname: Spanish: Ciudad Petrolera (English: Oil/Petroleum City)
- Location within Guanajuato Location within Mexico
- Coordinates: 20°34′13″N 101°11′50″W
- Country: Mexico
- State: Guanajuato
- Foundation: January 1, 1603

Government
  - Mayor: Julio César Ernesto Prieto Gallardo (Morena)

Area
  - City: 36.11 km^{2} (13.94 sq mi)
  - Municipality: 755.6 km^{2} (291.7 sq mi)
- Elevation: 1,721 m (5,646 ft)

Population (2020 census)
  - City: 160,682
  - Density: 4,450/km^{2} (11,520/sq mi)
  - Municipality: 273,417
  - Municipality density: 361.9/km^{2} (937.2/sq mi)
- Demonym: Salmantino (a)
- Time zone: UTC-6 (CST)
- Postal code: 36700
- Area code: 464
- Website: www.salamanca.gob.mx

Salamanca (Otomi: Xidoo "Place of Tepetate") is a city and municipality in the Mexican state of Guanajuato.

The city was founded on January 1, 1603, as 'Villa de Salamanca' by the Viceroy Gaspar de Zúñiga, fifth Count of Monterrey, who was originally from Salamanca (Spain). The town was founded in the lands of the Bajío, after cattle ranchers and poor farmers, a few Spaniards, and small groups of Otomis who formerly occupied a village named Xidoo, already lived in the area.

In recent years, many refineries have opened, and Salamanca has grown rapidly to become an important site for manufacturing and service industry in the region. Also, the University of Guanajuato has made many scientific contributions to develop agricultural and industrial technologies, giving a boost to the local and regional industries.

The city reported a 2020 census population of 160,682. The fourth largest city in the state (behind León, Irapuato, and Celaya), it is also the largest of four places called "Salamanca" in Mexico.

== Cuisine ==
Salamanca's cuisine is very diverse because, thanks to the oil refinery, it is a city that has people from all over the country, from cities such as Veracruz, Oaxaca and Mexico City. Each of these cities has its own variety of food, so one can find enchiladas, wheat gorditas, pambazo, hamburgers, its famous carnitas (pulled pork), arrachera, cabrito (goat), birria, barbecue, cecina, and pizza. There are food stands on virtually every street corner. Many types of locally made ice pops and ice cream are also popular in the city.

== Industry ==
The petrochemical industry is the primary one in the city, giving rise to numerous companies and bus transport services available for employees. The strategy was to boost the creation and development of the so-called "industrial corridor" of the Bajio.

The largest Pemex refinery in Mexico is located in Salamanca, and it is the 11th largest crude oil refinery in the world.

Also noteworthy is CFE Thermoelectric, a source of significant employment in the municipality.

In February 2014, Mazda opened its North American plant outside of Salamanca. At full production, the plant is expected to produce up to 240,000 vehicles per year and employ over 4,600 workers. About 30 percent of the vehicles sold in the United States will be sourced from this factory.

== Communications ==
=== Road links ===
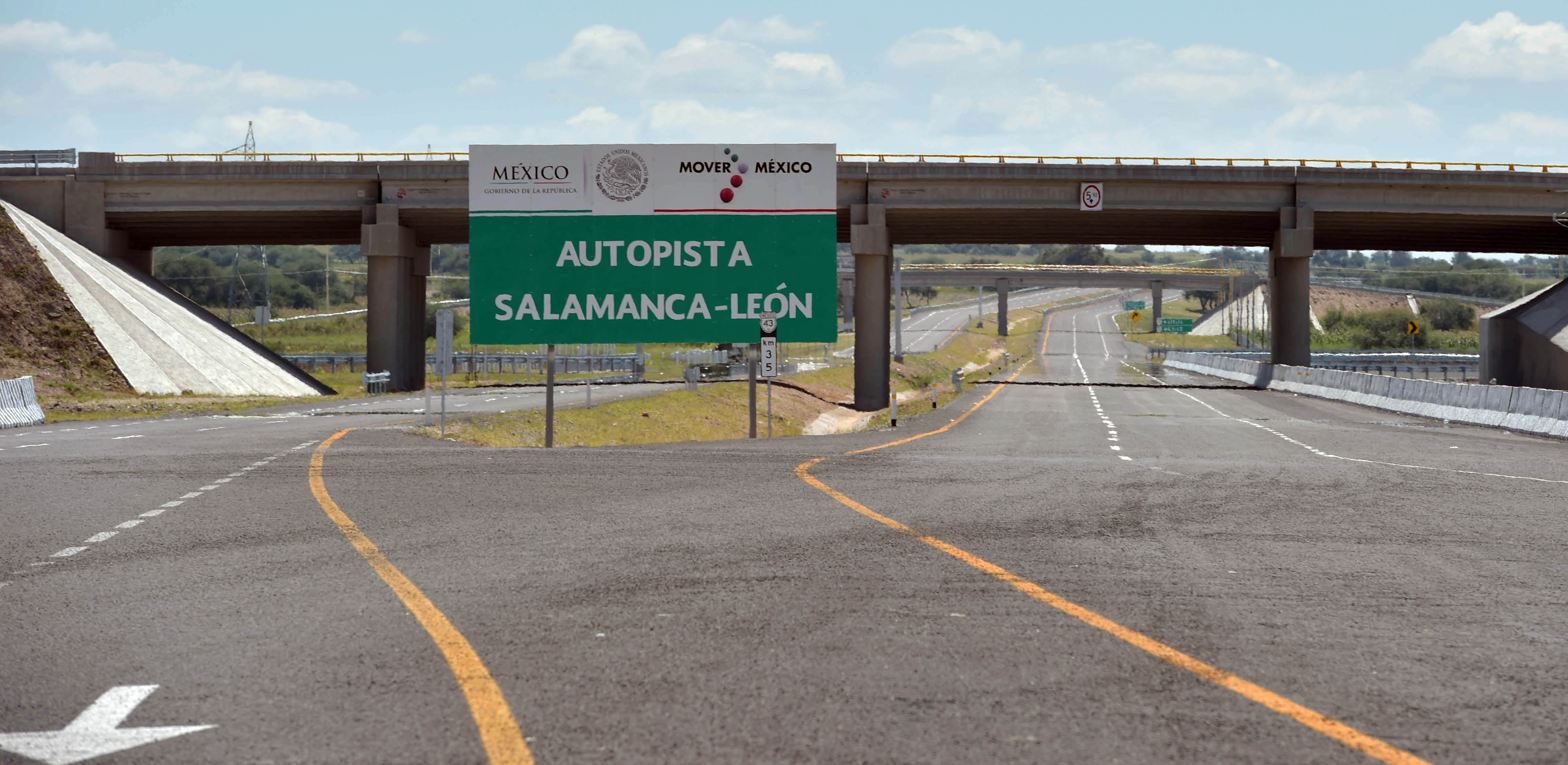
Section of the Salamanca-León autopista

It is possible to get to Salamanca by Federal Highway 45, which links the cities of Querétaro, Celaya, Irapuato, Silao and León; as well as Mexico City through Federal Highway 57. Federal Highway 43 also provides links south to the cities of Morelia and Lázaro Cárdenas in Michoacán.

=== Air transportation ===
While the city itself doesn't have an airport, it can be served by the Bajío International Airport (BJX), which serves the entire state of Guanajuato; the airport itself is about 50 kilometers away.

=== Rail transportation ===
Mexico hasn't had any long-distance rail passenger service since 2000 (except for a tourist line in the northwest), however there are plans to build a statewide Interurban Railway linking the same cities currently linked by Highway 45, in addition to the state's capital. However, this project has been stalled for at least 10 years.

=== TV/Radio stations ===
There are four available AM radio stations in the city: XEMAS, XEEMM, XEZH, XESAG, as well as one local TV channel available to local cable subscribers.

== Culture ==
The city has a rich craft industry, especially statues of wax, bronze, and pewter, and is also the location of the headquarters of the Center for the Arts of Guanajuato.

The former convent of San Juan de Sahagún and its church (with 12 monumental altarpieces artistically carved with 24 carat gold-plated sheet), and the former parish of St. Bartolomé Apostle are located within the city.

== Higher education ==
Salamanca offers several :

- Engineering Division, Irapuato-Salamanca Campus (DICIS), University of Guanajuato
- Technological University of Salamanca (UTS)
- Centro de Estudios Profesionales de Salamanca (CEPSA)
- University of Salamanca University of La Salle Bajio
- University of Salamanca University of Leon
- School of Engineering and Architecture of Bajio ESIABAC

== Sports ==
Salamanca currently had a soccer team named Petroleros de Salamanca C.F.C. (known as the Oilers) playing in Liga Premier.

== Climate ==
Climate data for Salamanca, Guanajuato (1991–2020 normals, extremes 1941–present)
Month	Jan	Feb	Mar	Apr	May	Jun	Jul	Aug	Sep	Oct	Nov	Dec	Year
Record high °C (°F)	33.5 (92.3)	34.0 (93.2)	39.5 (103.1)	39.0 (102.2)	42.5 (108.5)	39.0 (102.2)	36.5 (97.7)	38.5 (101.3)	36.0 (96.8)	36.6 (97.9)	37.2 (99.0)	36.5 (97.7)	42.5 (108.5)
Mean daily maximum °C (°F)	24.6 (76.3)	26.7 (80.1)	29.2 (84.6)	31.4 (88.5)	32.3 (90.1)	30.0 (86.0)	27.8 (82.0)	27.7 (81.9)	27.4 (81.3)	27.2 (81.0)	26.3 (79.3)	25.3 (77.5)	28.0 (82.4)
Daily mean °C (°F)	15.4 (59.7)	17.4 (63.3)	19.7 (67.5)	22.0 (71.6)	23.6 (74.5)	22.8 (73.0)	21.2 (70.2)	20.9 (69.6)	20.8 (69.4)	19.6 (67.3)	17.7 (63.9)	16.1 (61.0)	19.8 (67.6)
Mean daily minimum °C (°F)	6.3 (43.3)	8.0 (46.4)	10.3 (50.5)	12.6 (54.7)	14.9 (58.8)	15.6 (60.1)	14.6 (58.3)	14.1 (57.4)	14.1 (57.4)	11.9 (53.4)	9.1 (48.4)	7.0 (44.6)	11.5 (52.7)
Record low °C (°F)	−3.5 (25.7)	−3.3 (26.1)	1.0 (33.8)	1.3 (34.3)	7.0 (44.6)	8.0 (46.4)	10.5 (50.9)	−2.0 (28.4)	5.0 (41.0)	0.5 (32.9)	−0.2 (31.6)	−2.8 (27.0)	−3.5 (25.7)
Average precipitation mm (inches)	11.2 (0.44)	12.0 (0.47)	10.5 (0.41)	7.2 (0.28)	31.1 (1.22)	135.8 (5.35)	185.0 (7.28)	142.7 (5.62)	127.0 (5.00)	44.1 (1.74)	9.9 (0.39)	5.7 (0.22)	722.2 (28.43)
Average precipitation days (≥ 0.1 mm)	2.7	1.9	2.7	3.1	8.7	15.5	19.6	17.8	14.4	7.4	2.4	1.5	97.7
Source: Servicio Meteorológico Nacional

== Notable people ==
- Guillermina Jiménez Chabolla "Flor Silvestre" – singer, actress, and equestrienne who paid tribute to Salamanca in one of her early hits, "Adoro mi tierra" (1950).
- Enriqueta Jiménez Chabolla "La Prieta Linda" – singer and actress.
