= San Francisco de los Romo =

- Municipality
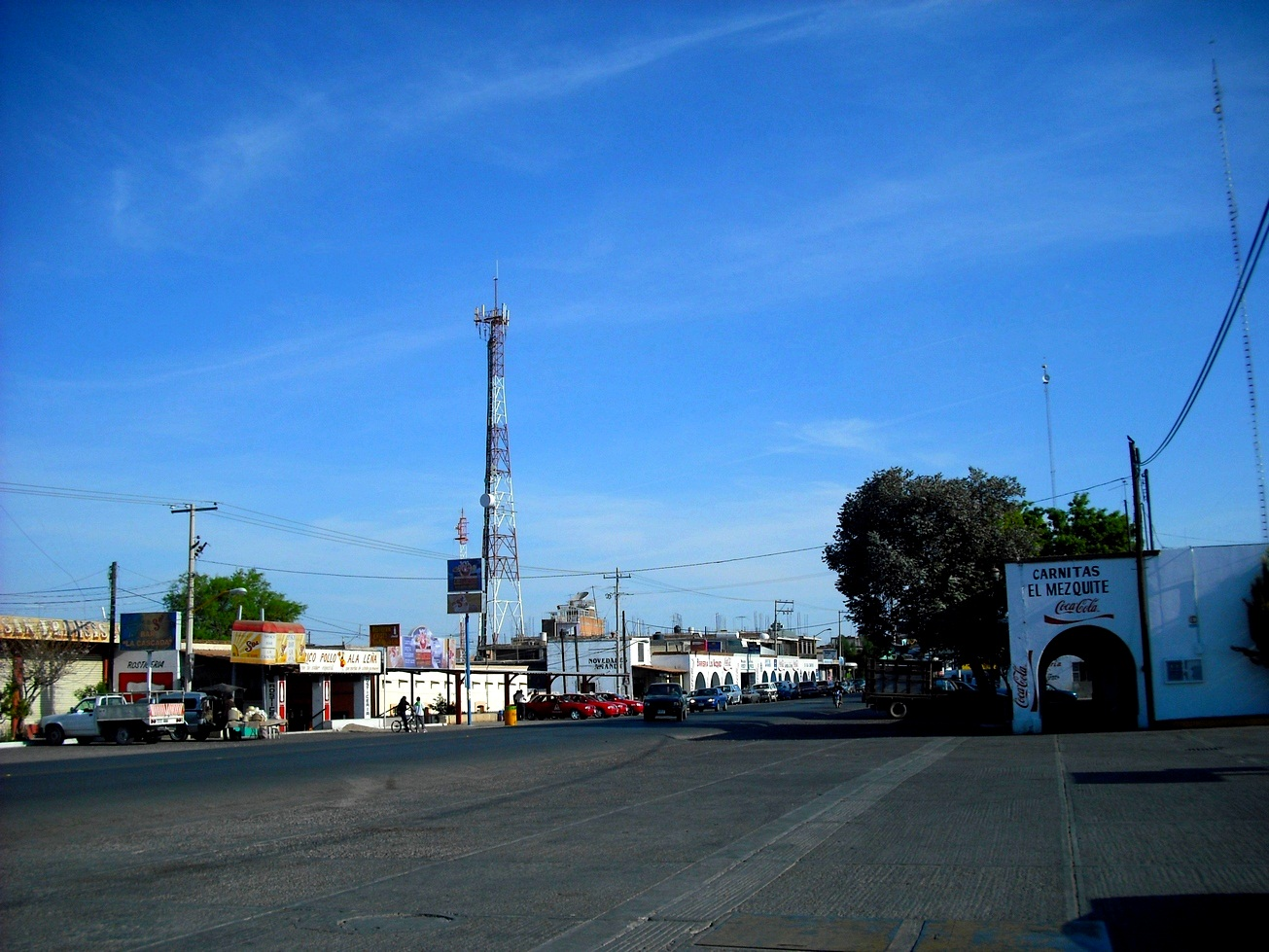

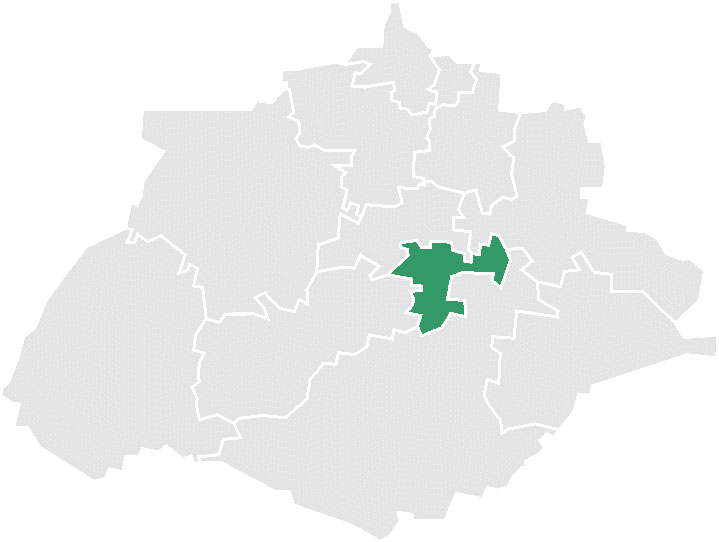
- Municipality location in Aguascalientes

- Location in Mexico San Francisco de los Romo (Mexico)
- Coordinates: 22°05′N 102°16′W
- Country: Mexico
- State: Aguascalientes

Government
  - Federal electoral district: Aguascalientes's 1st

Area
  - Land: 139.452 km^{2} (53.843 sq mi)

Population (2015)
  - Total: 46,454
  - Density: 333.1/km^{2} (863/sq mi)

San Francisco de los Romo is a municipality and city in the Mexican state of Aguascalientes. The city of San Francisco de los Romo serves as the municipal seat for the surrounding municipality of San Francisco de los Romo.

It is located in the middle of the Aguascalientes Valley, at 20 km towards north from the state capital Aguascalientes; it adjoins with the municipalities of Pabellón de Arteaga and Asientos to the north, Jesús María to the west, and Aguascalientes to the south-east. The city, which is the state's sixth-largest community, is located at the northwest corner of the municipality.

== Demographics ==
Historical population
Year	Pop.	±%
2010	35,769	—
2015	46,454	+29.9%
2020	61,997	+33.5%

As of 2010, the municipality had a total population of 35,769.

As of 2010, the city of San Francisco de los Romo had a population of 16,124. Other than the city of San Francisco de los Romo, the municipality had 117 localities, the largest of which (with 2010 populations in parentheses) were: Ex-viñedos Guadalupe (3,499), classified as urban, and Colonia Macario J. Gómez (2,122), Puertecito de la Virgen (1,976), Paseos de la Providencia (1,867), La Concepción (1,483), and La Escondida (El Salero) (1,318), classified as rural.

San Francisco de los Romo is the sixth-largest community in the state, is located at the northwest corner of the municipality and serves as its municipal seat.

== Geography ==
=== Climate ===
Climate data for San Francisco de los Romo (1951–2010)
Month	Jan	Feb	Mar	Apr	May	Jun	Jul	Aug	Sep	Oct	Nov	Dec	Year
Record high °C (°F)	35.0 (95.0)	37.0 (98.6)	39.0 (102.2)	43.0 (109.4)	44.0 (111.2)	42.0 (107.6)	40.0 (104.0)	39.0 (102.2)	38.0 (100.4)	39.0 (102.2)	34.0 (93.2)	38.0 (100.4)	44.0 (111.2)
Mean daily maximum °C (°F)	22.9 (73.2)	24.7 (76.5)	28.2 (82.8)	30.9 (87.6)	32.6 (90.7)	31.4 (88.5)	28.9 (84.0)	29.0 (84.2)	27.7 (81.9)	26.4 (79.5)	24.7 (76.5)	22.5 (72.5)	27.5 (81.5)
Daily mean °C (°F)	12.7 (54.9)	13.9 (57.0)	16.8 (62.2)	19.6 (67.3)	21.8 (71.2)	22.5 (72.5)	21.1 (70.0)	20.9 (69.6)	19.9 (67.8)	17.5 (63.5)	14.8 (58.6)	13.1 (55.6)	17.9 (64.2)
Mean daily minimum °C (°F)	2.5 (36.5)	3.1 (37.6)	5.3 (41.5)	8.2 (46.8)	11.1 (52.0)	13.6 (56.5)	13.2 (55.8)	12.9 (55.2)	12.1 (53.8)	8.5 (47.3)	4.8 (40.6)	3.7 (38.7)	8.3 (46.9)
Record low °C (°F)	−8.0 (17.6)	−6.2 (20.8)	−6.2 (20.8)	−0.8 (30.6)	0.0 (32.0)	5.0 (41.0)	5.0 (41.0)	5.4 (41.7)	2.0 (35.6)	−4.1 (24.6)	−4.2 (24.4)	−6.0 (21.2)	−8.0 (17.6)
Average precipitation mm (inches)	15.5 (0.61)	8.6 (0.34)	7.3 (0.29)	10.7 (0.42)	19.5 (0.77)	72.5 (2.85)	94.5 (3.72)	98.0 (3.86)	87.1 (3.43)	31.5 (1.24)	12.6 (0.50)	15.2 (0.60)	473.0 (18.62)
Average precipitation days (≥ 0.1 mm)	2.2	1.3	0.8	1.5	3.0	7.8	10.2	10.5	8.9	4.9	1.6	2.2	54.9
Source: Servicio Meteorologico Nacional
