= Pabellón de Arteaga Municipality =

Municipality in Aguascalientes, Mexico

Pabellón de Arteaga
- Municipality
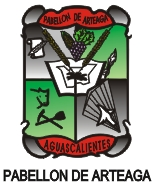
- Coat of arms

- Municipality location in Aguascalientes

- Location in Mexico
- Coordinates: 22°09′N 102°16′W
- Country: Mexico
- State: Aguascalientes
- Municipal seat: Pabellón de Arteaga

Government
  - Federal electoral district: Aguascalientes's 1st

Area
  - Total: 199.72 km^{2} (77.11 sq mi)

Population (2015)
  - Total: 46,473
  - Density: 232.69/km^{2} (602.67/sq mi)

Pabellón de Arteaga is municipality in the Mexican state of Aguascalientes. It stands at 22°09′N 102°16′W in the central part of the state. The city of Pabellón de Arteaga (2010 population: 28,633) serves as its municipal seat. The municipality had a population of 41,862 and an area of 199.33 km^{2} (76.97 sq mi). Its largest other town is named Emiliano Zapata.

== Demographics ==
Historical population
Year	Pop.	±%
2010	41,862	—
2015	46,473	+11.0%
2020	47,646	+2.5%

As of 2010, the municipality had a total population of 41,862.

As of 2010, the city of Pabellón de Arteaga had a population of 28,633. Other than the city of Pabellón de Arteaga, the municipality had 300 localities, the largest of which (with 2010 populations in parentheses) were: Emiliano Zapata (2,995), classified as urban, and Las Ánimas (1,794), Santa Isabel (1,065), Santiago (1,020), and San Luis de Letras (1,018), classified as rural.
