= Ciudad Jiménez =

City in the Mexican state of Chihuahua

- City and municipality

- Location in Mexico
- Coordinates: 27°7′48″N 104°54′24″W
- Country: Mexico
- State: Chihuahua
- City: 1898

Government
  - Major: Marcos Chávez Torres (PAN)

Population (2010)
  - Total: 34,281
- Postal code: 33980
- Area code: 629
- Demonym: Jimenense

Jiménez (officially, José Mariano Jiménez) is a city and seat of the municipality of Jiménez, in the northern Mexican state of Chihuahua. As of 2010, the city had a population of 34,281, up from 33,567 as of 2005.

It was founded on January 4, 1753, under the name of Real Presidio de Santa Maria de las Caldas del Valle de Huejoquilla. The current name (since 1826) honors Independence War hero José Mariano Jiménez. It was given city status in 1898.
