= List of bridges in Mexico =

== Historical or architectural interest bridges ==
	Name	Distinction	Length	Type	Carries Crosses	Opened	Location	State	Ref.
1	Maya Bridge at Yaxchilan destroyed	Possible largest span in the world until the 14th century Span : 63 m (207 ft); Guatemala–Mexico border	106 m (348 ft)	Suspension	Footbridge; Usumacinta River	7th century	Yaxchilan; 16°54′05″N 90°57′51.4″W	Chiapas; Guatemala	(Note: Its existence is not proven, it is a theory of archaeologists on the ancient Mayan city of Yaxchilan.)
2	Aqueduct of Padre Tembleque	Height : 38.7 m (127 ft); World Heritage Site; Historic monument	900 m (3,000 ft)	Masonry; 66 semi-circular arches	Aqueduct; Total length : 48.2 km (158,000 ft); Papalote ravine	1572	Santiago Tepeyahualco; 19°50′05.8″N 98°39′45.1″W	State of Mexico; Hidalgo	
3	Morelia Aqueduct	Historic Centre of Morelia; World Heritage Site; Historic monument	1,700 m (5,600 ft)	Masonry; 253 semi-circular arches	Aqueduct; Total length : 7 km (23,000 ft)	1730	Morelia; 19°41′54.7″N 101°10′38.4″W	Michoacán	
4	Aqueduct of Querétaro	Historic Monuments Zone of Querétaro; World Heritage Site	1,280 m (4,200 ft)	Masonry; 74 semi-circular arches	Aqueduct	1738	Querétaro City; 20°35′47.9″N 100°22′20.4″W	Querétaro	
5	Chapultepec aqueduct	Historic monument		Masonry; 22 semi-circular arches	Aqueduct; Total length : 4 km (13,000 ft); Avenida Chapultepec	18th century	Mexico City; 19°25′21.4″N 99°10′04.3″W	State of Mexico	
6	Tepotzotlán Aqueduct	One of the tallest aqueducts of colonial times Height : 56 m (184 ft)	425 m (1,394 ft)	Masonry; 4 levels, 56 semi-circular arches	Aqueduct	1854	Tepotzotlán; 19°45′59.4″N 99°20′20.6″W	State of Mexico	(Note: The construction of the aqueduct began around 1760 and was not finished until 1854 after having remained unfinished for a long time.)
7	Arcediano Bridge		118 m (387 ft)	Suspension; Wooden deck, masonry pylons	Footbridge; Río Grande de Santiago	1894	Guadalajara; 20°44′29.0″N 103°17′41.2″W	Jalisco	(Note: In 2012, the Arcediano Bridge was moved 700 meters downstream from the original building, to make way for what would be the construction of the Arcediano Dam.)
8	Ojuela Bridge	Span : 315 m (1,033 ft)	271 m (889 ft)	Suspension; Wooden deck	Footbridge	1898	Mapimí; 25°47′29.7″N 103°47′26.0″W	Durango	
9	Porfirio Díaz Bridge		80 m (260 ft)	Suspension	Road bridge Grijalva River; Sumidero Canyon	1908	Tuxtla Gutiérrez–Chiapa de Corzo; 16°44′32.5″N 93°02′04.6″W	Chiapas	
10	Albatros Bridge	First bascule bridge in Mexico	514 m (1,686 ft)	Beam bridge Steel; Bascule bridge	Road bridge Boulevard de las Bahías; Balsas River; Brazo de Río Balsas	2010	Lázaro Cárdenas; 17°56′19.6″N 102°11′04.2″W	Michoacán	

== Major bridges ==
The Baluarte Bridge held the record for the highest cable-stayed bridge in the world when it was inaugurated in 2012 with a maximum drop from the surface of the deck to the bottom of the Baluarte River of 403 metres (1,322 ft), according to the Guinness World Records, however, some diagrams of the bridge show a height of 390 metres (1,280 ft) between the axis of the central span and the river, the bridge having a regular slope of 5%. Its clearance is largely higher than that of the previous record-holder, France's Millau Viaduct, which has a clearance of 270 metres (890 ft) but it was beaten by the 565 metres (1,854 ft) high Duge Bridge in China, opened in 2016.

This table presents a non-exhaustive list of the road and railway bridges with spans greater than 100 metres (328 ft) or total lengths longer than 3,000 metres (9,843 ft).

	Name	Span	Length	Structural type	Carries Crosses	Opened	Location	State	Ref.
1	Baluarte Bridge	520 m (1,710 ft)	1,124 m (3,688 ft)	Cable-stayed; Composite steel/concrete deck, concrete pylons 2x68+70+520+54+56+72	Federal Highway 40D; Baluarte River	2012	Concordia–Pueblo Nuevo; 23°32′02.5″N 105°45′35.0″W	Sinaloa; Durango	
2	Tampico Bridge	360 m (1,180 ft)	1,543 m (5,062 ft)	Cable-stayed; Steel box girder deck, concrete pylons 3x70+360+3x70	Federal Highway 180; Pánuco River	1988	Tampico–Pueblo Viejo Municipality; 22°13′41.3″N 97°50′13.7″W	Tamaulipas; Veracruz	
3	La Concordia Bridge under construction	348 m (1,142 ft)	703 m (2,306 ft)	Cable-stayed; Composite steel/concrete deck, concrete pylons	Carretera Chicomuselo-Rizo de Oro La Concordia; Grijalva River; Angostura Dam Reservoir		La Concordia; 16°07′03.2″N 92°35′08.2″W	Chiapas	
4	Mezcala Bridge	311 m (1,020 ft)	882 m (2,894 ft)	Cable-stayed; Composite steel/concrete deck, 3 concrete pylons 87+80+311+299+84+68	Federal Highway 95D; Balsas River	1993	Eduardo Neri–Tepecoacuilco de Trujano; 17°56′08.0″N 99°22′10.2″W	Guerrero	
5	Coatzacoalcos II Bridge	288 m (945 ft)	1,170 m (3,840 ft)	Cable-stayed; Concrete box girder deck, concrete pylons	Federal Highway 180D; Coatzacoalcos River	1984	Minatitlán; 18°00′51.7″N 94°26′52.6″W	Veracruz	(Note: Also called Ingeniero Antonio Dovalí Jaime Bridge.)
6	Barra Vieja Bridge	220 m (720 ft)	470 m (1,540 ft)	Extradosed; Concrete deck, concrete pylons and cable-stays 90+220+90	Road bridge Ent. Potrero-Lomas; Papagayo River	2016	Lomas de Chapultepec; 16°42′59.4″N 99°36′20.3″W	Guerrero	
7	El Carrizo Bridge	217 m (712 ft)	434 m (1,424 ft)	Cable-stayed; Composite steel/concrete deck, 1 concrete pylon 217+182	Federal Highway 40D; El Carrizo Stream	2013	El Palmito; 23°30′56.7″N 105°47′35.7″W	Sinaloa	
8	Quetzalapa Bridge	213 m (699 ft)	424 m (1,391 ft)	Cable-stayed; Concrete deck, concrete pylon 105+213+105	Federal Highway 95D	1992	Ciudad de Huitzucos; 18°19′59.1″N 99°11′38.5″W	Guerrero	
9	Fernando-Espinosa Bridge	206 m (676 ft)		Beam bridge Steel; V-shaped legs	Federal Highway 80; Río Grande de Santiago		Guadalajara; 20°36′08.0″N 103°08′46.2″W	Jalisco	
10	Papaloapan Bridge	203 m (666 ft)	422 m (1,385 ft)	Cable-stayed; Concrete deck, concrete pylons 32+70+203+70+32	Federal Highway 145D; Papaloapan River	1995	Cosamaloapan; 18°19′18.9″N 95°47′56.4″W	Veracruz	
11	Manantial Santa Fe Bridge under construction	200 m (660 ft)	515 m (1,690 ft)	Cable-stayed	Toluca–Mexico City commuter rail		Mexico City; 19°23′05.5″N 99°14′31.6″W	State of Mexico	
12	Puente de la Unidad	185 m (607 ft)	304 m (997 ft)	Cable-stayed; Cantilever spar, concrete deck, 1 concrete pylon	Road 410; Santa Catarina River	2003	Monterrey; 25°40′08.2″N 100°22′49.0″W	Nuevo León	
13	San Marcos Bridge	180 m (590 ft)(x3)	850 m (2,790 ft)	Box girder Prestressed concrete 98+3x180+98	Federal Highway 132D; San Marcos River	2013	Xicotepec; 20°20′36.5″N 97°57′43.2″W	Puebla	(Note: Also called Ingeniero Gilberto Borja Navarrete Bridge.)
14	Vidalta Bridge	180 m (590 ft)	240 m (790 ft)	Cable-stayed; Steel box girder deck, 1 inclined concrete pylon 180+60	Road bridge	2013	Mexico City; 19°23′36.1″N 99°15′41.5″W	State of Mexico	
15	Beltrán Bridge	180 m (590 ft)	529 m (1,736 ft)	Box girder Prestressed concrete 120+180+120	Federal Highway 54D; Beltrán River	2019	San Marcos; 19°27′02.7″N 103°28′56.8″W	Jalisco	
16	San Cristóbal Bridge	178 m (584 ft)	324 m (1,063 ft)	Box girder Steel; 73+178+73	Federal Highway 190D	2006	Jobchenón; 16°41′41.7″N 92°49′17.9″W	Chiapas	
17	Barranca El Zapote Bridge	175 m (574 ft)	297 m (974 ft)	Cable-stayed; Composite steel/concrete deck, 1 concrete pylon 175+60+29	Federal Highway 95D; El Zapote Canyon	1993	Zumpango del Río; 17°41′51.2″N 99°30′27.4″W	Guerrero	
18	Texcapa Bridge	171 m (561 ft)	365 m (1,198 ft)	Box girder Prestressed concrete Fin back bridge 97+171+97	Federal Highway 132D	2005	Huauchinango; 20°08′10.5″N 98°06′17.8″W	Puebla; Hidalgo	
19	Río Chico Bridge	170 m (560 ft)	388 m (1,273 ft)	Box girder Prestressed concrete 109+170+109	Federal Highway 40D; Chico River	2005	Durango City; 23°58′37.2″N 104°53′21.1″W	Durango	
20	Chiapas Bridge	168 m (551 ft)(x5)	1,839 m (6,033 ft)	Box girder Steel; 92+152+5x168+124	Federal Highway 95; Nezahualcoyotl; Malpaso Dam	2003	Tecpatán–Ocozocoautla de Espinosa; 17°08′19.5″N 93°35′36.5″W	Chiapas	
21	Barranca El Cañon Bridge	166 m (545 ft)	297 m (974 ft)	Cable-stayed; Steel girder deck, 1 concrete pylon 49+166+24+21	Federal Highway 95D; El Cañon Canyon	1992	Eduardo Neri; 17°50′56.5″N 99°26′02.7″W	Guerrero	
22	Matute Remus Bridge	165 m (541 ft)	930 m (3,050 ft)	Cable-stayed; Steel box girder deck, steel pylons	Road bridge	2011	Guadalajara; 20°39′53.4″N 103°23′37.5″W	Jalisco	
23	Botijas Bridge	165 m (541 ft)	330 m (1,080 ft)	Box girder Prestressed concrete 82+165+82	Federal Highway 40D	2013	Pino Gordo; 23°35′49.4″N 105°42′48.4″W	Durango	
24	Boca del Cerro Railway Bridge under construction	160 m (520 ft)	220 m (720 ft)	Truss; Composite steel/concrete deck	Tren Maya; Usumacinta River		Tenosique; 17°25′37.0″N 91°29′28.0″W	Tabasco	
25	Marques Railway Bridge	152 m (499 ft)		Arch; Steel deck arch	Kansas City Southern de México; Lázaro Cárdenas–Uruapan; Marques River	1937	Nueva Italia; 19°05′33.7″N 102°04′09.4″W	Michoacán	
26	Boca del Cerro Bridge	150 m (490 ft)	189 m (620 ft)	Arch; Steel through arch Railroad bridge	Federal Highway 203; Usumacinta River	1950	Tenosique; 17°25′37.6″N 91°29′27.9″W	Tabasco	
27	Xalapa Bridge	145 m (476 ft)(x2)	470 m (1,540 ft)	Box girder Prestressed concrete 90+2x145+90	Federal Highway 140D	2012	Xalapa; 19°34′05.6″N 96°51′56.0″W	Veracruz	
28	Papagayo Bridge	141 m (463 ft)	315 m (1,033 ft)	Box girder Prestressed concrete Fin back bridge 76+141+75	Federal Highway 95D; Papagayo River	1991	Tierra Colorada; 17°07′53.3″N 99°33′31.4″W	Guerrero	
29	Beltrán Viaduct	141 m (463 ft)	297 m (974 ft)	Box girder Prestressed concrete 80+141+77	Federal Highway 54D; Beltrán River	1992	San Marcos; 19°26′36.2″N 103°28′30.0″W	Jalisco	
30	Metlac Highway Bridge	140 m (460 ft)	360 m (1,180 ft)	Beam bridge Steel; 110+140+110	Federal Highway 150D; Metlac River	1976	Fortín de las Flores; 18°54′25.4″N 97°00′48.0″W	Veracruz	
31	Neverías Bridge	140 m (460 ft)	320 m (1,050 ft)	Box girder Prestressed concrete 90+140+90	Federal Highway 40D; Neverías Creek	2005	Durango City; 23°59′30.6″N 104°51′17.1″W	Durango	
32	La Pinta Bridge	140 m (460 ft)	320 m (1,050 ft)	Box girder Prestressed concrete 90+140+90	Federal Highway 40D	2007	Los Mimbres; 23°57′34.2″N 105°01′46.5″W	Durango	
33	Bicentenario Bridge Aguascalientes	140 m (460 ft)	395 m (1,296 ft)	Arch; Steel tied arch Bow-string bridge	Road bridge	2010	Aguascalientes City; 21°51′29.0″N 102°17′34.6″W	Aguascalientes	
34	San Sebastián Bridge	138 m (453 ft)	193 m (633 ft)	Arch; Concrete deck arch	Federal Highway 544; San Sebastián river	2007	San Sebastián del Oeste; 20°47′57.7″N 104°56′11.9″W	Jalisco	(Note: Also called El Progreso Bridge.)
35	El Limón Bridge	133 m (436 ft)	426 m (1,398 ft)	Box girder Prestressed concrete 80+2x133+80	Federal Highway 54D; El Limón Stream	2019	San Marcos; 19°27′23.7″N 103°28′41.4″W	Jalisco	
36	Las Truchas Viaduct	130 m (430 ft)	433 m (1,421 ft)	Box girder Prestressed concrete 85+130+85	Autopista Jala-Compostela		Las truchas 21°08′54.0″N 105°02′19.1″W	Nayarit	
37	Agua Escondida Bridge	118 m (387 ft)	157 m (515 ft)	Arch; Steel deck arch	Federal Highway 54D; Agua Escondida Stream		Atenquique; 19°30′58.3″N 103°27′01.7″W	Jalisco	
38	El Platanar II Bridge	118 m (387 ft)	157 m (515 ft)	Arch; Steel deck arch	Federal Highway 54D		Platanar; 19°28′50.4″N 103°28′02.7″W	Jalisco	
39	Grijalva Bridge	116 m (381 ft)	391 m (1,283 ft)	Cable-stayed; Concrete deck, V concrete pylons 25+37+116+37+25	Federal Highway 186; Grijalva River	2001	Villahermosa; 17°59′50.6″N 92°54′43.7″W	Tabasco	
40	Río Rosas Bridge	115 m (377 ft)	255 m (837 ft)	Box girder Prestressed concrete 70+115+70	Federal Highway M40D; Arco Norte; Rosas river	2009	El Divisadero Fresno; 20°02′19.7″N 99°27′06.5″W	State of Mexico	
41	Devil's Canyon Bridge, Nayarit	115 m (377 ft)	258 m (846 ft)	Box girder Prestressed concrete 70+115+70	Autopista San Blas Tepic; Devil's Canyon	2013	Puerto de Lindavista; 21°34′25.0″N 105°03′16.4″W	Nayarit	
42	Paso de Piedra Bridge	112 m (367 ft)	224 m (735 ft)	Box girder Prestressed concrete 56+112+56	Federal Highway 40D	2012	Chavarría; 23°37′49.8″N 105°37′43.6″W	Durango	
43	Horganal Bridge	110 m (360 ft)(x2)	220 m (720 ft)	Box girder Prestressed concrete 2x110	Federal Highway 179	2013	San Bartolo Albarradas; 16°56′39.0″N 96°12′29.7″W	Oaxaca	
44	Infiernillo II Bridge	106 m (348 ft)(x3)	525 m (1,722 ft)	Truss; Steel; 103+3x106+103	Federal Highway 37D; Infiernillo	2003	Infiernillo; 18°25′03.8″N 101°53′52.6″W	Michoacán	
45	Pueblo Nuevo Bridge	106 m (348 ft)(x2)	322 m (1,056 ft)	Box girder Prestressed concrete 55+2x106+55	Federal Highway 40D	2013	Chavarría; 23°38′11.5″N 105°36′56.0″W	Durango	
46	New Atenquique Bridge	106 m (348 ft)(x3)	526 m (1,726 ft)	Box girder Prestressed concrete 104+3x106+104	Federal Highway 54D; Atenquique Stream	2019	Atenquique; 19°31′50.8″N 103°26′45.0″W	Jalisco	
47	Magiscatzin Bridge	104 m (341 ft)		Truss; Steel	Federal Highway 80; Tamesí River		Magiscatzin; 22°47′50.9″N 98°42′48.5″W	Tamaulipas	
48	Magiscatzin Bridge 2011	104 m (341 ft)	224 m (735 ft)	Arch; Steel tied arch Bow-string bridge	Federal Highway 80; Tamesí River	2011	Magiscatzin; 22°47′50.3″N 98°42′47.6″W	Tamaulipas	
49	Infiernillo Bridge	102 m (335 ft)(x2)	359 m (1,178 ft)	Truss; Steel	Federal Highway 37D; Balsas River	2002	Infiernillo–Barranca de San Diego; 18°15′13.4″N 101°54′18.5″W	Michoacán; Guerrero	
50	Arroyo Pinzandarán Bridge	102 m (335 ft)(x2)	308 m (1,010 ft)	Truss; Steel	Federal Highway 37D	2003	Infiernillo; 18°23′48.9″N 101°53′49.7″W	Michoacán	
51	Viaduct 1 (Toluca–Mexico City commuter rail) under construction	96 m (315 ft)	25,300 m (83,000 ft)	Arch; Steel tied arch Bow-string bridge Box girder Prestressed concrete	Toluca–Mexico City commuter rail	2023	Toluca–Ocoyoacac; 19°16′49.9″N 99°30′01.0″W	State of Mexico	
52	Viaduct 2 (Toluca–Mexico City commuter rail) under construction	55 m (180 ft)	4,500 m (14,800 ft)	Box girder Prestressed concrete	Toluca–Mexico City commuter rail	2023	Ocoyoacac; 19°17′41.8″N 99°25′08.1″W	State of Mexico	
53	Zacatal Bridge	48 m (157 ft)	3,698 m (12,133 ft)	Beam bridge Prestressed concrete	Federal Highway 180; Laguna de Términos; Gulf of Mexico	1994	Ciudad del Carmen–Zacatal; 18°37′34.8″N 91°49′57.1″W	Campeche	
54	La Unidad Bridge (Campeche)	30 m (98 ft)	3,277 m (10,751 ft)	Beam bridge Prestressed concrete	Federal Highway 180; Laguna de Términos; Gulf of Mexico	1982; 2019	Ciudad del Carmen–Isla Aguada; 18°46′25.6″N 91°30′35.1″W	Campeche	(Note: The La Unidad Bridge from 1982 has 30 metres (98 ft) spans while the new 2019 bridge has 45 metres (148 ft) spans.)
55	Lagoon of Cuyutlán Railway Viaduct	28 m (92 ft)		Beam bridge Prestressed concrete	Desvío ferroviario en el vaso II; Lagoon of Cuyutlán	2012	Manzanillo; 19°02′32.4″N 104°16′13.4″W	Colima	
56	Viaduct 1 (Guadalajara urban rail system)		8,650 m (28,380 ft)	Box girder Composite steel/concrete	Guadalajara Urban Electric Train System; Line 3	2020	Guadalajara–Zapopan; 20°42′44.0″N 103°22′30.0″W	Jalisco	
57	Viaduct 2 (Guadalajara urban rail system)		7,450 m (24,440 ft)	Box girder Composite steel/concrete	Guadalajara Urban Electric Train System; Line 3	2020	Guadalajara–Tlaquepaque; 20°38′15.2″N 103°18′00.1″W	Jalisco	
58	Marques II Railway Bridge			Arch; Steel deck arch	Kansas City Southern de México; Lázaro Cárdenas–Uruapan		Santa Casilda; 19°09′06.0″N 101°59′24.2″W	Michoacán	

== Planned bridges ==
	Name	Span	Length	Structural type	Carries Crosses	Opened	Location	State	Ref.
1	Huites Dam Bridge planned	424 m (1,391 ft)	712 m (2,336 ft)	Cable-stayed	Choix-Bahuichivo Highway; Fuerte River; Huites Dam Reservoir		Choix; 26°54′10.2″N 108°17′42.3″W	Sinaloa	
2	Rizo de Oro Bridge planned	350 m (1,150 ft)	700 m (2,300 ft)	Cable-stayed; Composite steel/concrete deck, concrete pylons	Carretera Chicomuselo-Rizo de Oro La Concordia; Grijalva River; Angostura Dam Reservoir		La Concordia; 16°01′45.4″N 92°32′37.1″W	Chiapas	

== See also ==
- Transport in Mexico
- Rail transport in Mexico
- List of Mexican Federal Highways
- List of Mexican autopistas
- Geography of Mexico
- List of rivers of Mexico
