= Espinazo del Diablo =

Mountain region in northwest Mexico

The Espinazo del Diablo (Devil's Backbone) is a region of the Sierra Madre Occidental in the states of Sinaloa and Durango in northwestern Mexico. The region is known its natural beauty and biodiversity, including rare cloud forests, and for a stretch tortuous mountain highway (part of Mexican Federal Highway 40) also called the Espinazo del Diablo.

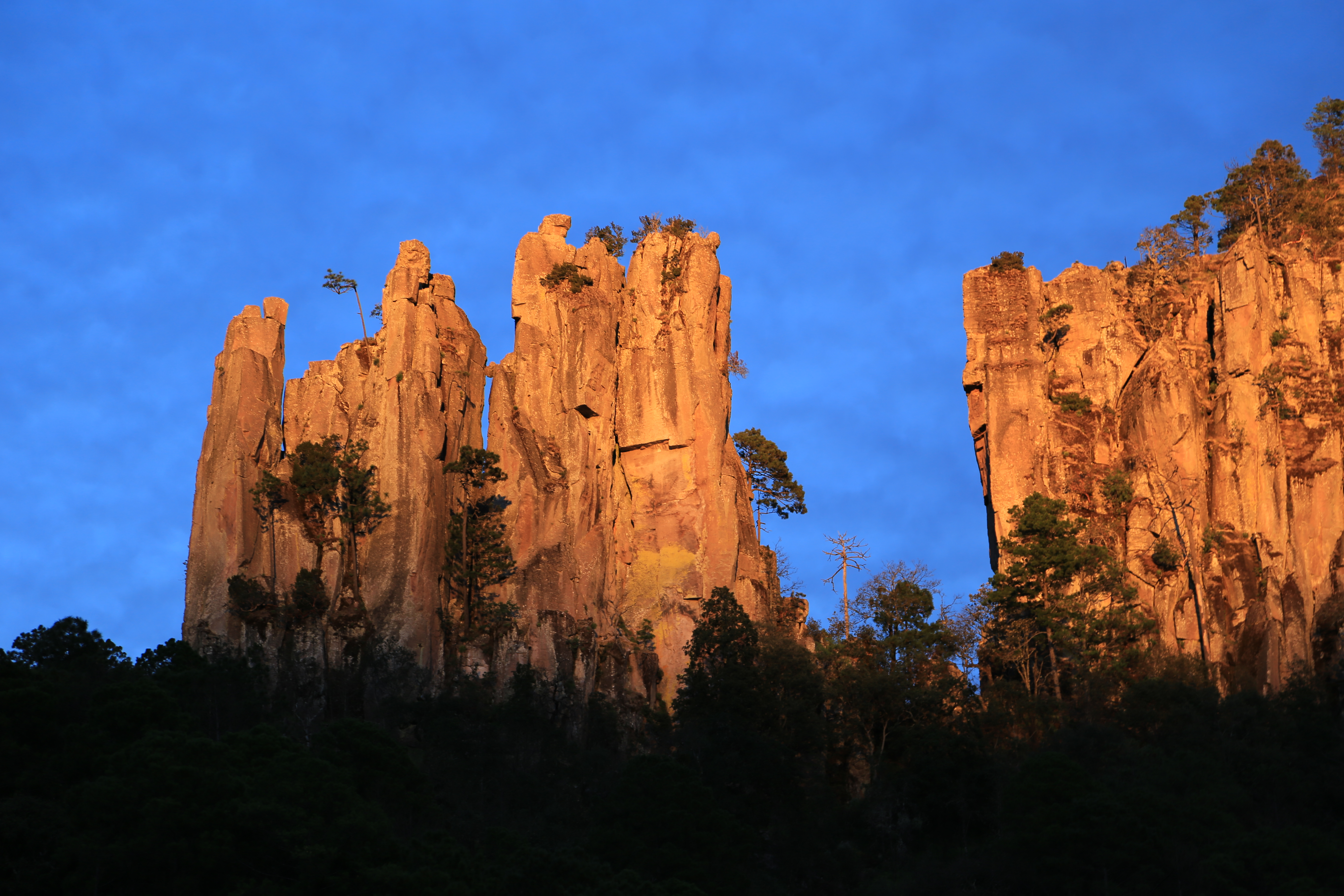

== Geography ==
The Espinazo del Diablo is on the western slope of the Sierra Madre Occidental. The Sierra rises from the Pacific coastal plain of Sinaloa state, ascending from 200 to 3000 meters elevation eastwards into Durango. It is in Concordia Municipality of Sinaloa, and Pueblo Nuevo and San Dimas municipalities of Durango.

== Climate ==
The climate ranges from warm-sub-humid at lower elevations to semi-warm sub-humid at middle elevations to temperate sub-humid at the highest elevations. The orientation of the mountains to the prevailing winds creates some higher-rainfall areas at middle elevations.

== Flora ==
At lower elevations the predominant vegetation is low dry deciduous forest. The dominant trees are species of Ipomoea, Lysiloma, and Bursera, along with thorny scrub and Opuntia and Stenocereus cactus. Taller trees, including Brosimum alicastrum, Ceiba pentandra, and species of Ficus, grow in canyons and other areas with greater moisture.

Oak (Quercus) forests are predominant above 900 meters elevation. Typical trees include Quercus castanea, Q. jonesii, Q. fulva, Q. glaucescens, and Q. tuberculata. Patches of pine forest are interspersed with the oaks at 1200 meters elevation, and forest of oaks and pines is common above 1600 meters elevation.

Cloud forest, also known as mesophyllous montane forest, is found in humid ravines and glens 1,900 and 2,200 meters elevation, interspersed among the upper oak and pine–oak forests. Cloud forests are found in only a few locations in the Sierra Madre Occidental, and are home to distinctive communities of plants and animals. Typical cloud forest trees include oyamel (Abies religiosa), Arbutus glandulosa, Clethra lanata, Magnolia tarahumara, Tilia sp., Trema micrantha, and Ostrya virginiana. The trees are abundantly covered in epiphytes, including lichens, ferns, and bromeliads.

Pine forest is predominant between 2,400 and 3,000 meters elevation. The most common pines are Pinus gordoniana, P. herrerae, P. leiophylla, P. lumholtzii, and P. oocarpa, together with Abies religiosa, Arbutus xalapensis, and Styrax argenteus.

== Fauna ==
229 species of birds have been recorded in the region, including 43 species which are endemic to Mexico. Limited-range species observed in the region include the tufted jay (Cyanocorax dickeyi), eared quetzal (Euptilotis neoxenus), and thick-billed parrot (Rhynchopsitta pachyrhyncha). The imperial woodpecker (Campephilus imperialis) had been observed in the region, but is now believed to be extinct.

== Highway ==
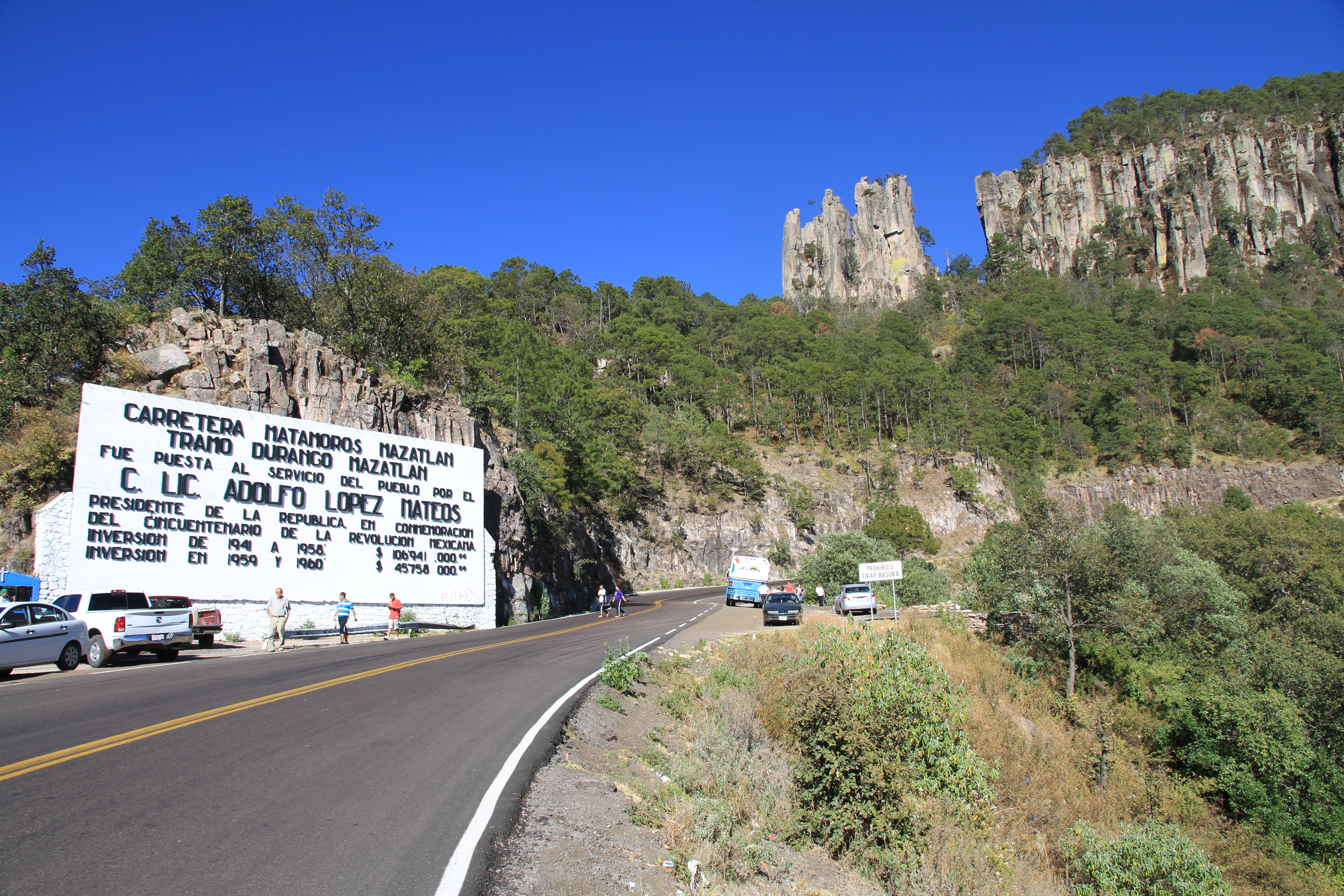

Mexican Federal Highway 40 passes through the Espinazo del Diablo as it crosses the Sierra between Durango on the Mexican Plateau and Mazatlán on the Pacific coast. The road is narrow and full of tight curves and steep drop-offs. Frequent fog and seasonal ice present additional hazards. The drive typically takes 7 or 8 hours. The road offers magnificent scenery, including a vista at 2,440 meters elevation flanked by two steep ravines at kilometer 168, and a summit at 2,744 meters at the crest of the Sierra.

In 2013 a section of Mexican Federal Highway 40D, a toll highway, was completed parallel to the old highway. The new highway is wider and straighter, with 115 bridges and 61 tunnels, and offers a faster route across the mountains.
