= Mexican Federal Highway 40D =

Toll highways in Mexico

Federal Highway 40D
- Carretera federal 40D

Route information
- Maintained by Secretariat of Communications and Transportation

Location
- Country: Mexico

Highway system
- Mexican Federal Highways; List; Autopistas

Federal Highway 40D is the designation for toll highways paralleling Mexican Federal Highway 40. Highway 40D connects Mazatlán, Sinaloa to Reynosa, Tamaulipas. It forms most of the highway corridor between Mazatlán and Matamoros, Tamaulipas, one of 14 major highway corridors in the country.

== Mazatlán-Durango ==
Autopista Durango-Mazatlán
- Location: Fed. 15D in Villa Unión, Sinaloa to Fed. 40 west of Durango City
- Length: 230 km (140 mi)

Highway 40D begins at a junction with Mexican Federal Highway 15D at Villa Unión, Sinaloa, southeast of Mazatlán. The first toll plaza is located at the next interchange, serving the village of Mesillas. The road winds through the area known as the Espinazo del Diablo—the Devil's Backbone—with many bridges and tunnels on the route.

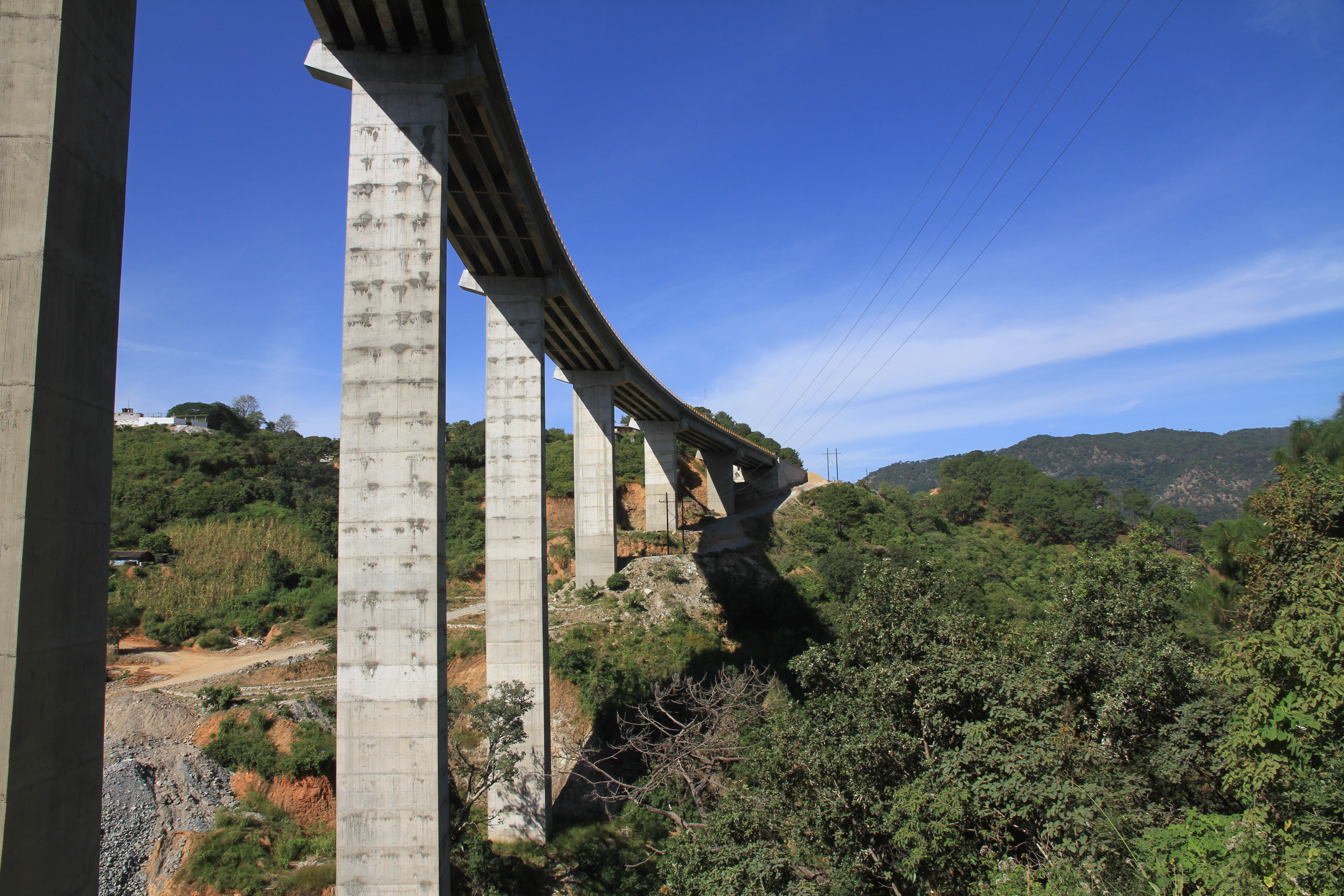
The Santa Lucía Bridge

Highway 40D crosses the Baluarte River and the Sinaloa-Durango state line on the 403-metre (1,322 ft) Baluarte Bridge, then the world's tallest cable-stayed bridge, which was formally inaugurated in January 2012. Several exits provide access to nearby villages, but the only town of size, for which Highway 40D serves as a bypass, is El Salto, the seat of Pueblo Nuevo Municipality. Past El Salto, the terrain slowly flattens, and the Durango-Mazatlán stretch ends with one more toll plaza west of Durango, for a total of four on the route.

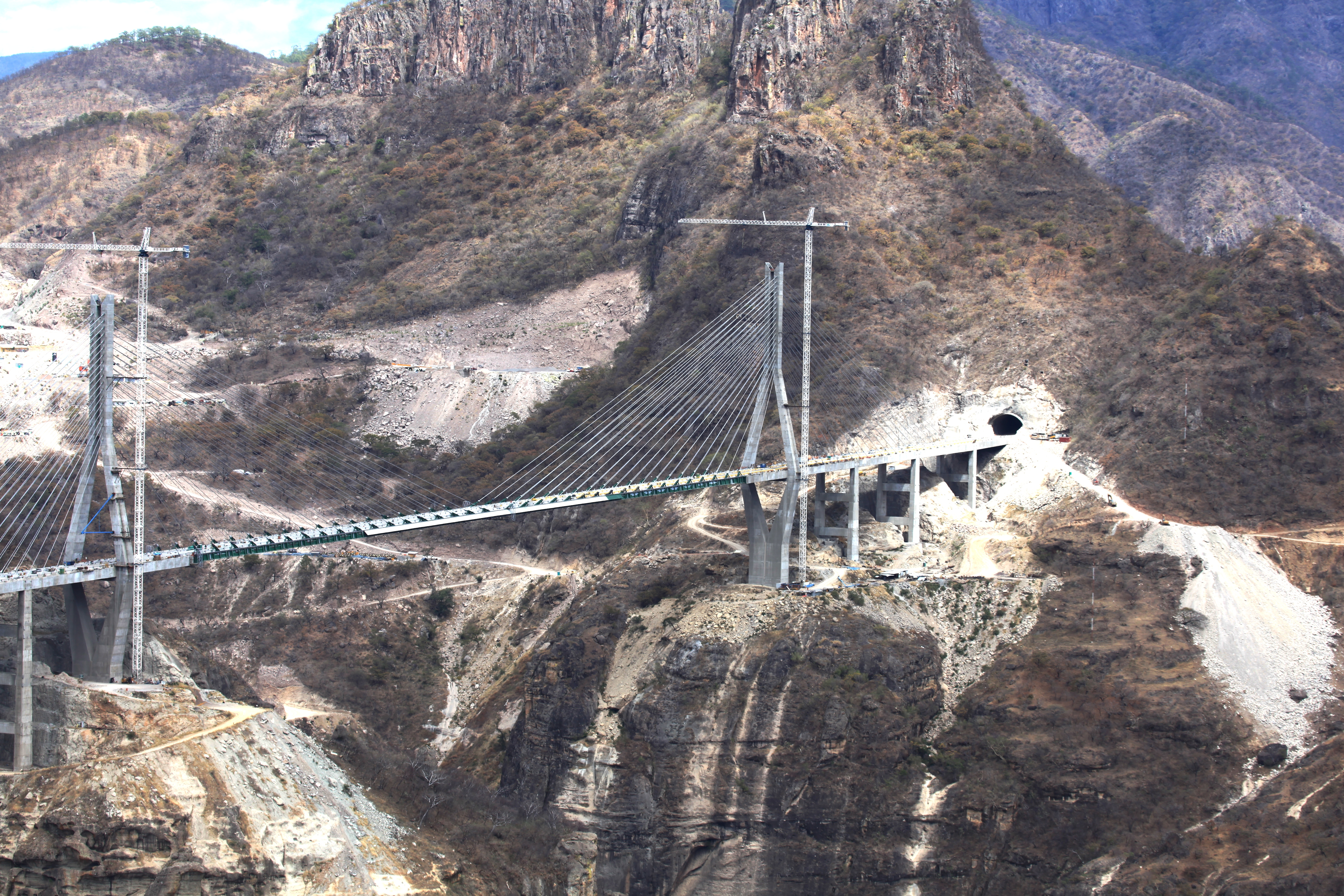
The Baluarte Bridge in March 2012, shortly before inauguration

The construction of a highway from Mazatlán to Durango was deemed by the SCT in 2008 to be the "largest project in Mexican highway history" and by President Felipe Calderón to be the "most complex highway in the world". The highway crosses some of Mexico's most hazardous terrain, with 68 tunnels and 115 bridges—including the Baluarte Bridge, then the tallest cable-stayed bridge in the world—which accounts for 70 percent of the road's distance. Additionally, land had to be acquired from local ejidatarios, who complained that they were being paid too little for their land.

The final 80 kilometres (50 mi) of the 230-kilometre (140 mi) highway was inaugurated by Enrique Peña Nieto on October 17, 2013, bringing to an end twelve years of construction at a project cost that grew 195 percent. At that time, Caminos y Puentes Federales (CAPUFE), an agency of the federal government, took over maintenance and operations of the so-called "superhighway" (supercarretera).

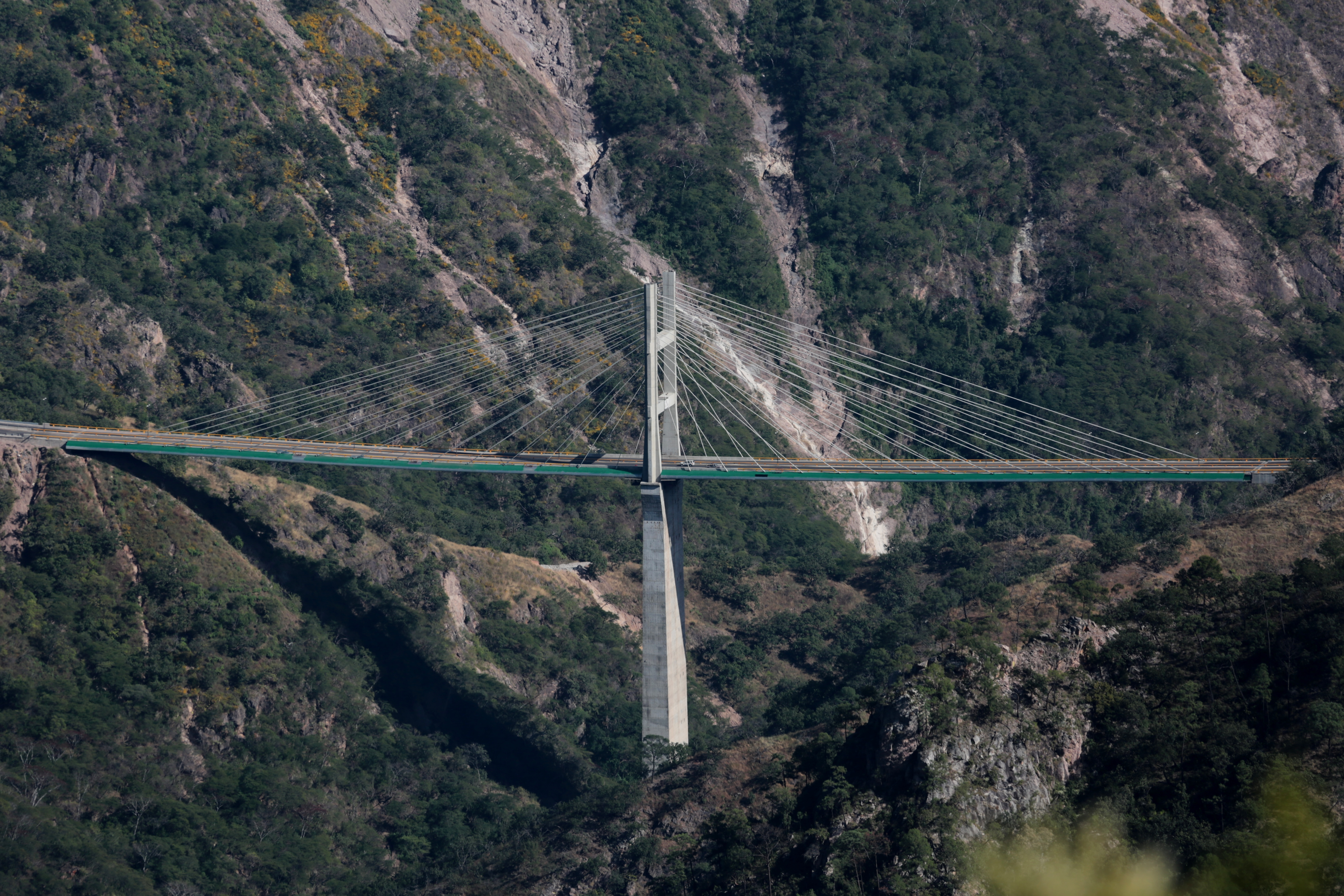
Puente El Carrizo

Since the road's completion, several issues have plagued the highway. In 2015, CAPUFE closed the Pánuco Tunnel at kilometer 185, stating that it was in danger of collapsing. That same year, the Coscomate toll plaza was taken over for 141 days, causing the loss of MXN$80 million in toll revenues. The highway closure affected truckers, who noted that transportation costs would increase during the closure because free Mexican Federal Highway 40 could not handle 53-foot trucks, which had to detour through Guadalajara and Torreón to reach Durango. Drivers said they preferred to use the older road at night because of the many potholes that had developed; while CAPUFE pledged hundreds of millions of pesos in repair work and storm water management, that never materialized. Portions of the El Carrizo bridges also required structural reinforcement, with the SCT carrying out repairs in the Sinaloa portion of the route.

CAPUFE charges a total toll of MXN$536 to travel from Durango to Mazatlán on Federal Highway 40D, at its four toll plazas.

== Libramiento de Durango ==
Libramiento de Durango
- Location: Fed. 40 west of Durango City to Fed. 40 northeast of Durango City
- Length: 21.6 km (13.4 mi)

Highway 40D is routed around Durango on the northern 21.6 kilometres (13.4 mi) of the 60.28 kilometres (37.46 mi) Libramiento Periférico de Durango, which circles the city and was inaugurated in August 2012.

== Durango-Gómez Palacio ==
Autopista Durango-Yerbanís Autopista Yerbanís-Gómez Palacio
- Location: Fed. 40 northeast of Durango City to Fed. 49 in Gómez Palacio
- Length: 220 km (140 mi)

ACSA (Autopistas de Cuota, S.A.), a subsidiary of Coconal, holds the concessions for the three separate (but contiguous) roads connecting Durango to the Comarca Lagunera and bypassing its cities of Gómez Palacio and Torreón. Legally defined as two separate segments divided at Yerbanís of 118 kilometres (73 mi) and 102 kilometres (63 mi), the concessions for Highway 40D from Durango to Gómez Palacio opened on September 23, 1993 and October 8, 1991, respectively.

Highway 40D connects the two largest cities in the state of Durango, Durango City and Gómez Palacio, via Yerbanís. A section of this route, from Cuencamé to Gómez Palacio, is co-signed as Mexican Federal Highway 49D to match the overlap of free highways 40 and 49 in the same area. The Durango-Yerbanís highway has a toll of MXN$226; the segment between Yerbanís and Gómez Palacio has a toll of MXN$286.

== Libramiento Norte de la Laguna ==
Libramiento Norte de la Laguna
- Location: Fed. 49 in Gómez Palacio, Durango to Fed. 40 in Matamoros, Coahuila
- Length: 40.77 km (25.33 mi)

The Libramiento Norte de la Laguna serves as a total northern bypass of the Comarca Lagunera. It was inaugurated by President Peña Nieto on April 17, 2014 and runs 40.7 kilometres (25.3 mi) from the junction with Federal Highway 49 to east of Matamoros, Coahuila.

It is operated by Operadora de Autopistas, S.A. de C.V. (OPASA) and has a toll of MXN$87.

== Torreón-Saltillo ==
Autopista Torreón-Saltillo
- Location: Fed. 40 in Matamoros, Coahuila to Fed. 40 west of Saltillo
- Length: 206.8 km (128.5 mi)

The Autopista Torreón-Saltillo begins in Matamoros, Coahuila and proceeds toward Saltillo. It is maintained by CAPUFE and divided into two segments by an overlap with Mexican Federal Highway 40 in the La Cuchilla area. Two toll plazas, La Cuchilla and Plan de Ayala, charge a combined toll of MXN$184 to use those two segments of the route.

== Libramiento Norponiente de Saltillo ==
Libramiento Norponiente de Saltillo
- Location: Fed. 40 / Fed. 54 west of Saltillo to Fed. 40 northeast of Durango City
- Length: 23.77 km (14.77 mi)

Legally assigned the designation S30 and signed as 40D, the 23.77-kilometre (14.77 mi) Libramiento Norponiente de Saltillo (Saltillo Northwest Bypass) opened in October 2010. Like the Saltillo-Monterrey highway, the Libramiento Norponiente de Saltillo is operated by CAMS.

== Saltillo-Monterrey ==
Autopista Saltillo-Monterrey
- Location: Fed. 40 northeast of Saltillo to Av. Ignacio Morones Prieto in Santa Catarina, Nuevo León
- Length: 49.89 km (31.00 mi)

Leaving Saltillo, the 40D designation returns again for the highway connecting Saltillo to Monterrey, Nuevo León. Highway 40D closely parallels Highway 40, with its lone toll booth (Santa Catarina) placed before the junction with the Anillo Periférico de Monterrey, which serves as the latter's western terminus and also provides access to Highway 40. Travelers also have the option of going straight to connect with Avenida Ignacio Morones Prieto, a major urban thoroughfare in the Monterrey area, in Santa Catarina, though this route is MXN$25 more expensive than exiting onto the Monterrey beltway. In combination with the Libramiento Norponiente de Saltillo, it has a toll of MXN$161.

== Cadereyta-Reynosa ==
Autopista Cadereyta-Reynosa
- Location: Fed. 40 in Cadereyta, Nuevo León to Fed. 40 northeast of General Bravo, Nuevo León
- Length: 132.02 km (82.03 mi)

The stretch of Highway 40D from Cadereyta toward Reynosa, Tamaulipas, is entirely within the state of Nuevo León. It is operated by CAPUFE, which charges a MXN$226 toll for cars. The road has interchanges serving Cadereyta, Los Ramones, Los Herreras, and General Bravo, with the highway's lone toll plaza located near the latter city. Highway is mostly used to transport people fast from the Metropolitan Area of Reynosa-Matamoros to Monterrey.

== Libramiento de Reynosa Sur II ==
Libramiento de Reynosa Sur II
- Location: Fed. 40 west of Reynosa to Fed. 2 / Fed. 2D east of Reynosa
- Length: 36.4 km (22.6 mi)

The Libramiento de Reynosa Sur II is the easternmost stretch of Highway 40D, receiving the designation in 2017. It allows traffic between Matamoros, Tamaulipas, and Monterrey, to bypass Reynosa altogether. Construction began on March 28, 2008, but it took more than seven years to complete the western end of the highway connecting the road to Highway 40.

Operation of the segment is by CAPUFE and has a toll of MXN$22.
