= Copala, Sinaloa =

Silver-mining town in Sinaloa

Copala
- Town
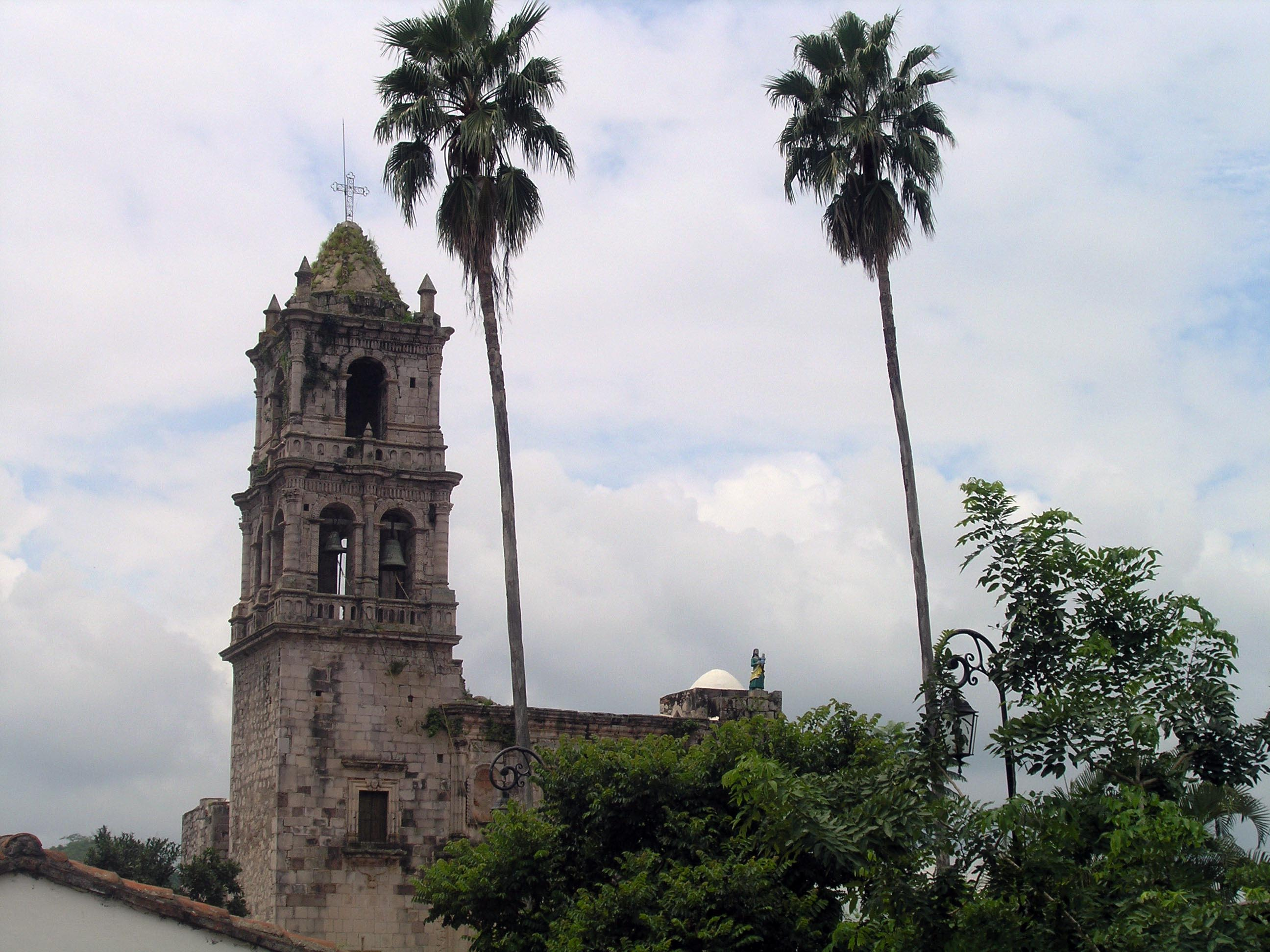
- San José de Copala
- Interactive map of Copala
- Country: Mexico
- State: Sinaloa
- Municipality: Concordia
- Postal code: 82650

Copala, formerly known as San José de Copala, is a four-century-old silver-mining town in the Mexican state of Sinaloa. The town is in the municipality of Concordia.

== History ==
The area was occupied and ruled by the indigenous peoples until 1564, when Francisco de Ibarra crossed the Sierra Madre Occidental from Durango and conquered the area for Spain. In 1565 prospectors discovered silver veins and the town of Copala was founded to serve the mines. The town was named after a mythical city of gold for which de Ibarra had unsuccessfully searched in northern Mexico.

The town of Copala was destroyed in 1616 by an uprising of Tepehuan Indians, but was rebuilt after the rebellion was quelled the following year.

== Economy ==
The economy of Copala is based on tourism, mining, and agriculture.

== Geography ==
Copala is located at 23°23′41″N 105°55′57″W, at an altitude of 610 m. The town is along Federal Highway 40, approximately 50 km east of Mazatlán.
