= Mexican Federal Highway 40 =

Highway in Mexico

Federal Highway 40
- Carretera federal 40

Route information
- Maintained by Secretariat of Communications and Transportation
- Length: 1,145.4 km (711.7 mi)

Major junctions
- East end: Fed. 2 in Reynosa
- Fed. 35 in General Bravo Fed. 54 in Monterrey; Fed. 85 in Monterrey; Fed. 54 northeast of Ramos Arizpe; Fed. 54 northeast of Ramos Arizpe; Fed. 54 / Fed. 57 in Saltillo; Fed. 40D in Puebla, Coahuila; Fed. 40D in La Paila, Coahuila; Fed. 40D in La Cuchilla, Coahuila; Fed. 30 in La Cuchilla; Fed. 40D in Matamoros, Coahuila; Fed. 30 in Torreón; Fed. 34 near Pedriceña, Durango; Fed. 49 in Cuencamé; Fed. 40D in Yerbanis; Fed. 40D in Cinco de Mayo, Durango; Fed. 45 in Cinco de Mayo; Fed. 23 / Fed. 45 in Durango; Fed. 40D in El Salto; Fed. 40D in Concordia, Sinaloa Fed. 15D in Villa Unión
- West end: Fed. 15 near Mazatlán

Location
- Country: Mexico

Highway system
- Mexican Federal Highways; List; Autopistas
← Fed. 39	→ Fed. 41

Mexican Federal Highway 40 (Spanish: Carretera Federal 40), also called the Carretera Interoceánica (Interoceanic Highway) and colloquially known as the "Fed 40", is a major east–west highway that spans more than 1,140 kilometres (700 mi) through northern Mexico, beginning at Reynosa, Tamaulipas (just west of the Port of Brownsville, Texas), and ending at its intersection with Mexican Federal Highway 15 in Villa Unión, Sinaloa, near Mazatlán and the Pacific coast. It is called "interoceanic" because the cities of Matamoros, Tamaulipas, on the Gulf of Mexico and Mazatlán on the Pacific Ocean were linked upon its opening.

The highway passes through Monterrey in Nuevo León; Saltillo and Torreón in Coahuila; Gómez Palacio and the city of Durango in Durango. The Monterrey to Durango City section is a four-lane divided highway. The rest of the road is a two-lane undivided road. Mexican Federal Highway 40D, a four-lane restricted-access toll road, runs parallel to the main highway in some sections. As it passes between Durango and Sinaloa, Federal Highway 40 travels over the Baluarte Bridge, the highest bridge in the Americas and the longest cable-stayed bridge in the world.

== Route ==
=== Reynosa to Monterrey ===
From Reynosa, Tamaulipas, to La Junta, Nuevo León, the roadway is a four-lane, divided, unrestricted-access road. At La Junta, the highway is separated into Fed. 40 and Fed. 40D. Fed. 40 then continues as a two-lane undivided road, passing through several small towns, including:

- Peña Blanca, Nuevo León
- General Bravo, Nuevo León
- China, Nuevo León
- Cadereyta Jiménez, Nuevo León

The Cadereyta Jiménez massacre occurred on 13 May 2012 along the road outside the city of Monterrey.

=== Monterrey to Saltillo ===
From Monterrey, Nuevo León, to Saltillo, Coahuila, Fed. 40 is a four-lane, divided, unrestricted-access road. The highway crosses the northern end of the Sierra Madre Oriental that divides Coahuila and Nuevo León.

=== Saltillo to Torreón ===
From Saltillo the road continues west as a four-lane, unrestricted-access road. After the town of El Mesón, the road splits into the four-lane toll road Fed. 40D and a two-lane, undivided, unrestricted Fed. 40. Both roads merge again in the town of 28 de Agosto and begin another section of four-lane, divided, unrestricted highway. A few kilometers west is the junction south to Parras de la Fuente. At La Cuchilla, the road splits again into Fed. 40 and Fed. 40D. From there, one may take Fed. 30 to San Pedro, which eventually becomes a four-lane, divided, unrestricted road and leads directly to northern Torreón. At the city of Matamoros, Fed. 40 and Fed. 40D merge again into a four-lane, divided, unrestricted highway until reaching Torreón. This section is the east–west section across the central Mexican Plateau.

=== Torreón to Gómez Palacio ===
Torreón, Coahuila, and Gómez Palacio, Durango, form a metropolitan area. At Gómez Palacio, Fed. 40 merges with Mexican Federal Highway 49, which comes from the north. At Gómez Palacio one can choose between Feds 40 or 49 and Feds 40D or 49D; both roads are four-lane divided highways until the first toll plaza.

=== Gómez Palacio to Durango ===
At Gómez Palacio one can choose between the toll road and the unrestricted road. At Cuencamé, Durango, the roads diverge: Fed. 49 continues south to Zacatecas and Mexico City, and Fed. 40 continues west to Durango.

=== Durango to Mazatlán ===
This section of the highway crosses the Sierra Madre Occidental and is narrow with many curves, particularly the portion known as the Espinazo del Diablo west of the Sierra crest. It has recently been bypassed by the new Fed. 40D. The old Fed. 40 can take up to 8 hours to travel, while Fed. 40D can be traveled in as little as 3 hours. During the winter months there is the added danger of ice. When traveling eastbound, Mazatlán to Durango, after reaching the top of the Sierra Madre Occidental, Fed. 40 becomes more linear, and it goes through the towns of La Ciudad, El Salto, and El Soldado. It continues up to a point around 30 kilometers from Durango, and it again goes downhill with many curves. In all the downhill sections, the use of engine braking is advised in order to prevent the burnout of friction brakes.

== Current developments ==
=== New highway from Durango to Mazatlán ===
Improvement of the corridor between Durango and Mazatlán has shortened the travel time between the two cities from approximately 8 hours to slightly under 2.5 hours. In addition to being a boon to travel and commerce between Durango and Sinaloa and points beyond, authorities expected enhanced security in the region due to quicker access and mobility of the military. The new highway, known officially as Autopista Durango-Mazatlán, was completed in 2012 and inaugurated by President Enrique Peña Nieto on October 17, 2013. The route passes through and over the Sierra Madre Occidental by way of 63 new tunnels totaling nearly 18 km (11 mi) in length, and 115 new bridges, eight of which are over 270 m (890 ft) high. The most important of the latter is the Baluarte Bridge, spanning the Baluarte River, which forms the border between the states of Durango and Sinaloa. At 1,124 m (3,688 ft) in length, it is the world's longest cable-stayed bridge. With 403 m (1,322 ft) between the bridge deck and the river below, it is also the third-highest cable-stayed bridge in the world, the ninth-highest bridge overall, and the highest bridge in the Americas.
