= Santa Lucía, Sinaloa =

Town in the Mexican state of Sinaloa

Santa Lucía
- Town
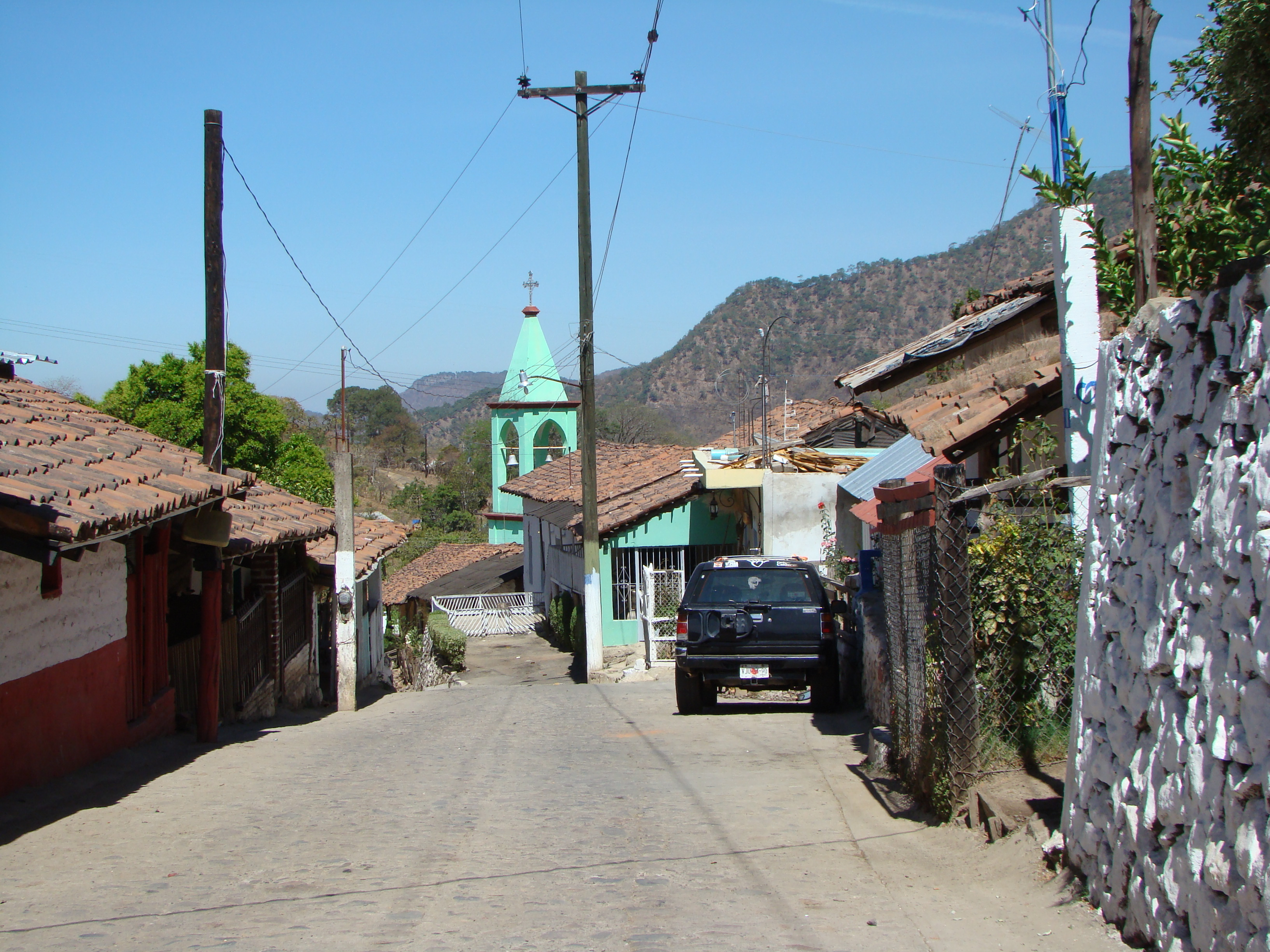
- Street in Santa Lucía, Sinaloa
- Interactive map of Santa Lucía
- Coordinates: 23°26′06″N 105°50′59″W
- Country: Mexico
- State: Sinaloa
- Municipality: Concordia

Population
  - Total: 300
- Time zone: UTC-7 (Pacific (US Mountain))
- Postal code: 82660
- Area code: 694

Santa Lucía is a town located in the mexican municipality of Concordia, Sinaloa. It has approximately 300 inhabitants. It is located 27 kilometers southeast of the town of Concordia. In 2017, the Mexican army built a base in the town to reinforce security.
