= Malpica, Sinaloa =

Town in the Mexican state of Sinaloa

Malpica
- Town
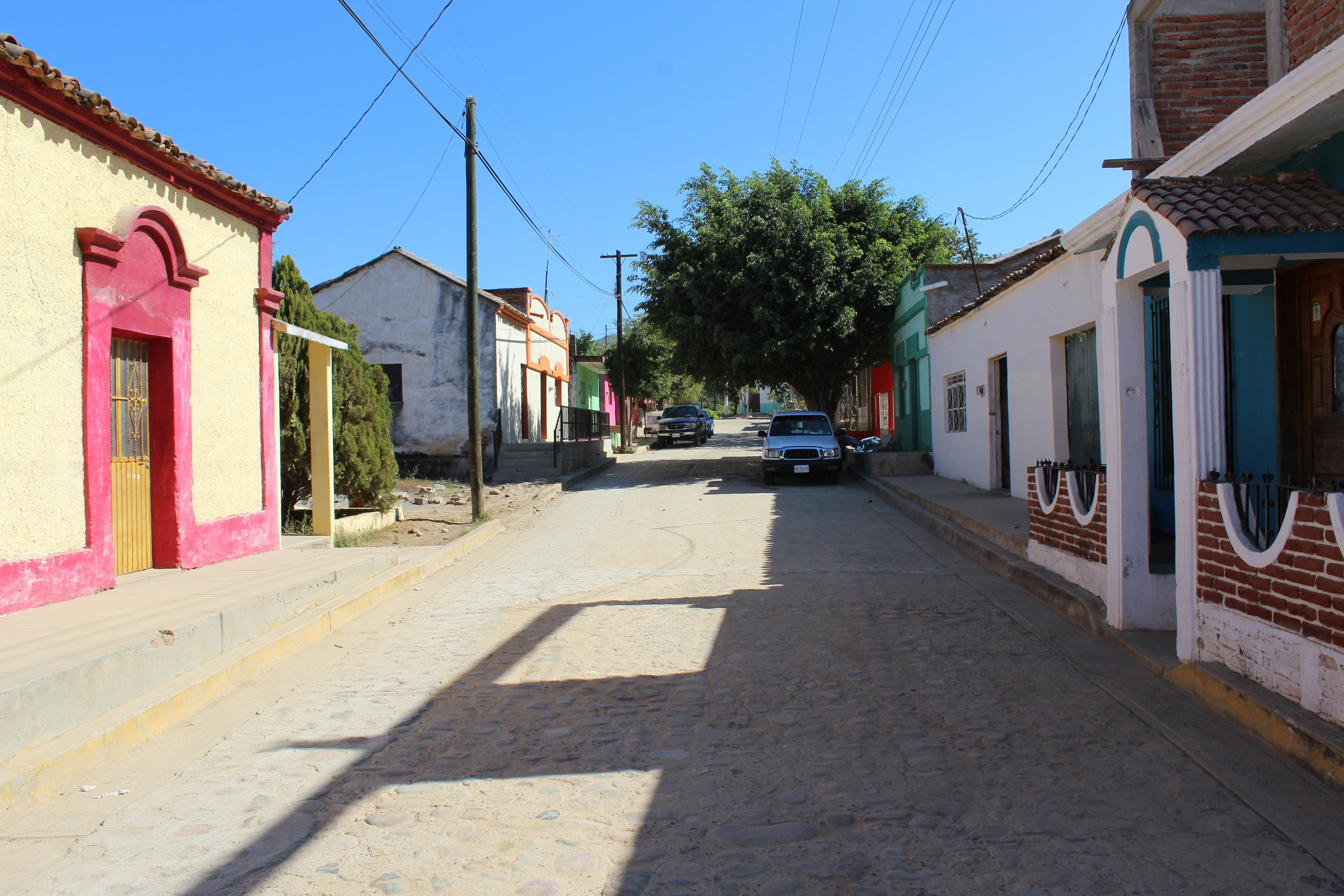
- Street in Malpica, Sinaloa
- Interactive map of Malpica
- Country: Mexico
- State: Sinaloa
- Municipality: Concordia

Population
  - Total: 623
- Time zone: UTC-7 (Mountain Standard Time)
- Postal code: 82646
- Area code: 694

Malpica is a Mexican town located in the municipality of Concordia, Sinaloa. It is located 35 kilometers south of Mazatlán. Its economy depends on mango production, livestock and tourism. Its approximate population is 623 inhabitants.
