= Baluarte River =

River in Mexico

- Location of mouth

Location
- Country: Mexico
- State: Durango, Sinaloa

Physical characteristics
- Mouth
  - location: Pacific Ocean
  - coordinates: 22°50′27″N 106°01′57″W
  - elevation: Sea level
- Length: 142 km (88 mi)

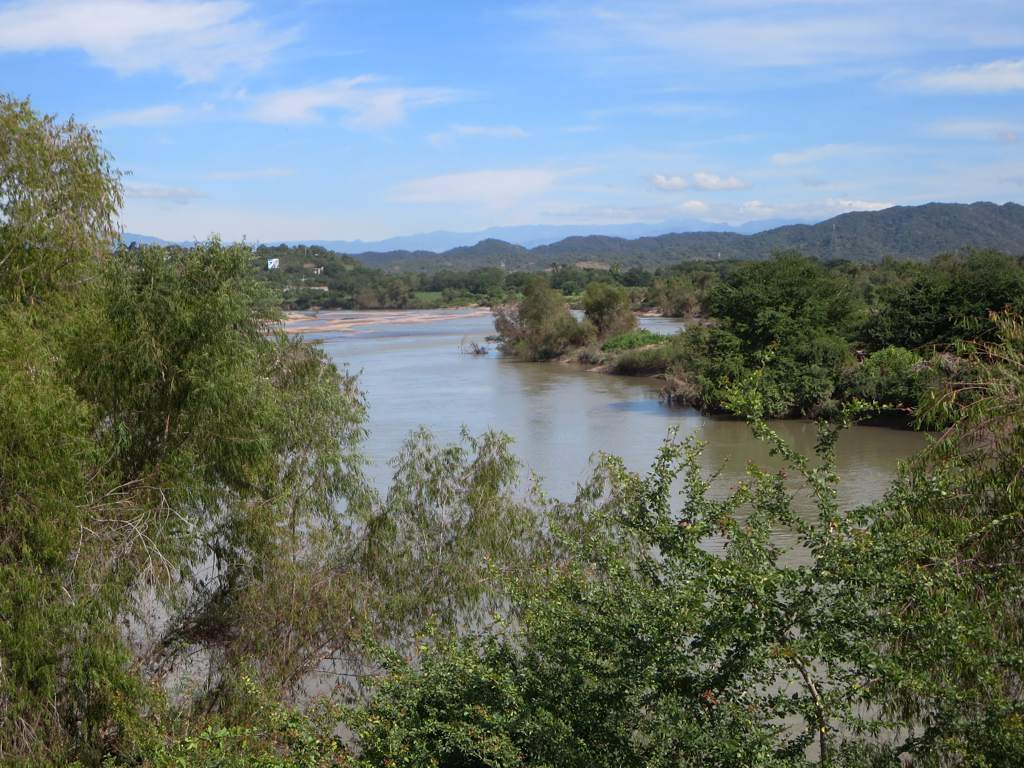

The Baluarte River, (Rio del Baluarte) is a river of Mexico in the states of Durango and Sinaloa, traversing 142 km, part of which forms the border between these two states.

The river drains to the Pacific Ocean with a basin of 5,101.67 square kilometres (1,969.77 sq mi).

The portion of the river, near Concordia in Sinaloa, is spanned by the Durango–Mazatlán highway via the Baluarte Bridge - the highest cable-stayed bridge in the world.

== See also ==
- List of rivers of Mexico
- List of rivers of the Americas by coastline
