= Quercus fulva =

Conservation status
- Least Concern (IUCN 3.1)

Scientific classification
- Kingdom: Plantae
- Clade: Tracheophytes
- Clade: Angiosperms
- Clade: Eudicots
- Clade: Rosids
- Order: Fagales
- Family: Fagaceae
- Genus: Quercus
- Subgenus: Quercus subg. Quercus
- Section: Quercus sect. Lobatae
- Species: Q. fulva

Binomial name
- Quercus fulva Liebm.

Synonyms
- Quercus rosei Trel.

Species of oak tree

Leaves of the quercus fulva

Quercus fulva is a Mexican species of oak tree. It is native to northern and western Mexico, found in Sinaloa, Durango, Nayarit, Chihuahua, and Coahuila.

== Description ==
Quercus fulva is a tree up to 10 meters tall with a trunk as much as 30 cm in diameter.
