= Baluarte Bridge =

Baluarte Bridge Puente Baluarte
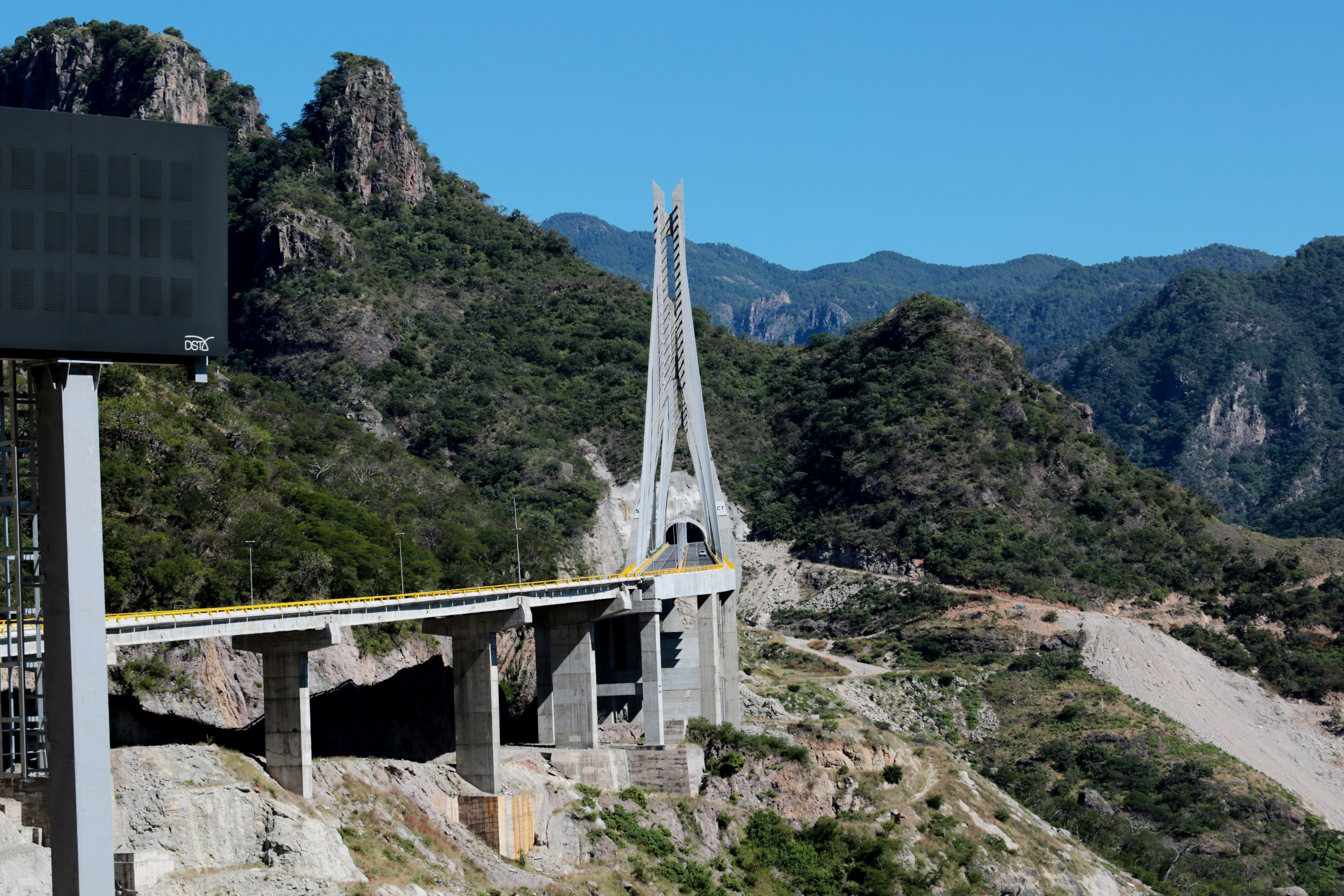
- Baluarte Bridge shortly after completion, 10 March 2012
- Coordinates: 23°32′03″N 105°45′46″W
- Carries: 4 lanes of Fed. 40 – Durango, Mazatlán
- Crosses: Baluarte River
- Locale: Concordia in Sinaloa and Pueblo Nuevo in Durango, Mexico
- Official name: Puente Baluarte Bicentenario

Characteristics
- Design: Cable-stayed bridge
- Material: Prestressed concrete
- Total length: 1,124 m (3,688 ft)
- Width: 19.8 m (65 ft)
- Longest span: 520 m (1,710 ft)
- Clearance below: 403 m (1,322 ft)

History
- Construction start: 21 February 2008
- Construction end: (inaugurated) 5 January 2012
- Opened: late 2013

Location
- Interactive map of Baluarte Bridge

The Baluarte Bridge (Spanish: Puente Baluarte), officially the Baluarte Bicentennial Bridge (Spanish: Puente Baluarte Bicentenario), is a cable-stayed bridge in Mexico. It is located between the municipalities of Concordia in Sinaloa and Pueblo Nuevo in Durango, along the Durango–Mazatlán highway, Mexico 40D. The bridge has a total length of 1,124 m (3,688 ft), with a central cable-stayed span of 520 m (1,710 ft). With the road deck at 403 m (1,322 ft) above the valley below, the Baluarte Bridge is the third-highest cable-stayed bridge in the world, the ninth-highest bridge overall, and the highest bridge in the Americas.

Construction of the bridge began in 2008, it was inaugurated in January 2012 and opened to traffic in late 2013. The bridge forms part of a new highway linking the Atlantic and Pacific coasts of northern Mexico and has reduced the travelling time between Durango and Mazatlán from approximately 6 to 2.5 hours.

== Structure and construction ==
The bridge's four-lane roadway, 20 metres (66 ft) wide by 1,124 metres (3,688 ft) long, is supported at a height of 403 metres (1,322 ft) above the Baluarte riverbed by 12 piers, two of which are also pylons (towers). Each of the two pylons measures 18 by 8.56 metres (59.1 by 28.1 ft) at its base, widens to carry the roadway, and tapers to 8 by 4.10 metres (26.2 by 13.5 ft) at its top; the taller, P5, is 169 metres (554 ft) high. 76 steel cables pass over saddles in the pylons to form 152 suspenders in a two plane semi-fan layout. The tallest intermediate pier, P9, is 148 metres (486 ft) high.

It crosses a gorge in the Sierra Madre Occidental mountains with a clearance of 390 metres (1,280 ft) below the deck. Its clearance is 120 metres (390 ft) higher than that of the previous record-holder, France's Millau Viaduct, which has a clearance of 270 metres (890 ft). The bridge's central span, 520 metres (1,710 ft) long, is also the longest cable-stayed span in North America, 37 metres (121 ft) longer than that of the John James Audubon Bridge in St. Francisville, Louisiana.

Construction on the bridge began on 21 February 2008. The work was carried out by a consortium that included Tradeco Infraestructura, IDINSA, Aceros Corey and VSL México, which was awarded the contract in May 2007 by the Mexican transport and communications ministry, the SCT, beating two other higher-priced bidders. The cost has risen significantly from the original bid of 1.28 billion pesos (US$118 million); according to an SCT official, this is due, among other things, to the number of structures involved in such a project. The work is being funded by Mexico's National Infrastructure Fund (Fonadin) and the Durango-Mazatlán Trust (Fiduma). It is planned that the cost of the bridge will be recovered by concessionary fees from the highway's operator.

The choice of a cable-stayed design was made to enable the construction to proceed outward from each of the two main pylons, thus making it unnecessary to build an expensive and time-consuming falsework. By January 2012, the bridge's construction had required the use of 1,500 workers and engineers, 12,000 tonnes (11,800 long tons; 13,200 short tons) of steel and 90,000 cubic metres (118,000 cubic yards) of concrete. 447,000 cubic metres (584,700 cubic yards) of rock were excavated to lay the bridge's foundations.

The Baluarte Bridge construction is part of an 18 billion peso (US$1.44 billion) project to build a new highway connecting Durango with Mazatlán across some of Mexico's most rugged mountains. The cost of the bridge itself has been put at 2.18 billion pesos (US$158.7 million). It will replace a notoriously dangerous road over the mountains, which are known locally as "the Devil's Backbone". The old road was built in the 1940s in terrain so difficult that mules had to be used to bring in supplies for the construction workers. It is the only crossing through the mountains for 500 miles (800 km). The new Mazatlán–Durango highway will include 63 tunnels and 32 bridges, eight of which will be over 300 metres (980 ft) high. When completed, the new highway is expected to slash the travelling time between Durango and Mazatlán from eight hours to two and a half. It is intended to form part of an eventual road link between the Atlantic and Pacific coasts of Mexico. Around 2,000 vehicles are expected to use the bridge daily.

== Inauguration and economic and social impact ==
The Baluarte Bridge was inaugurated by President Calderón on 5 January 2012. Officials from Guinness World Records were on hand at the inauguration ceremony to certify the bridge as the world's highest cable-stayed bridge. At the time it was about 86 per cent complete. It was finished in late January 2012, and went operational by 2013. Its official name as the "Bicentennial" bridge refers to the 2010 bicentenary of the Mexican declaration of independence from Spain at the start of the Mexican War of Independence in 1810. It had been hoped that the bridge would be inaugurated in the second half of 2010 as part of the bicentennial celebrations, but delays pushed the date back.

During the ceremony, Calderón hailed the bridge as a way to "unite the people of northern Mexico as never before." Officials expressed the hope that it would boost trade and tourism in the area, which is one of the most remote parts of Mexico. The region is seriously affected by poverty and lawlessness which has prompted many locals to take up illegal drug farming, smuggling and even highway robbery on the old Durango–Mazatlán road. Poor communications in the region have made it difficult to police. This bridge has deemed Mexico safe since its conception. According to a town administrator in Pueblo Nuevo municipality, the new bridge and road will help to improve security by reducing the region's isolation. Officials have also expressed hopes that it will help to promote economic development. Durango's state government plans to build a new industrial park on a 4,300-acre (1,700-hectare) site adjoining the highway, while Sinaloa's governor anticipates a boost in the usage of Mazatlán's port from the increase in cross-country traffic. The project is reported to have created 3,500 jobs directly and a further 12,000 indirectly.

== Gallery ==
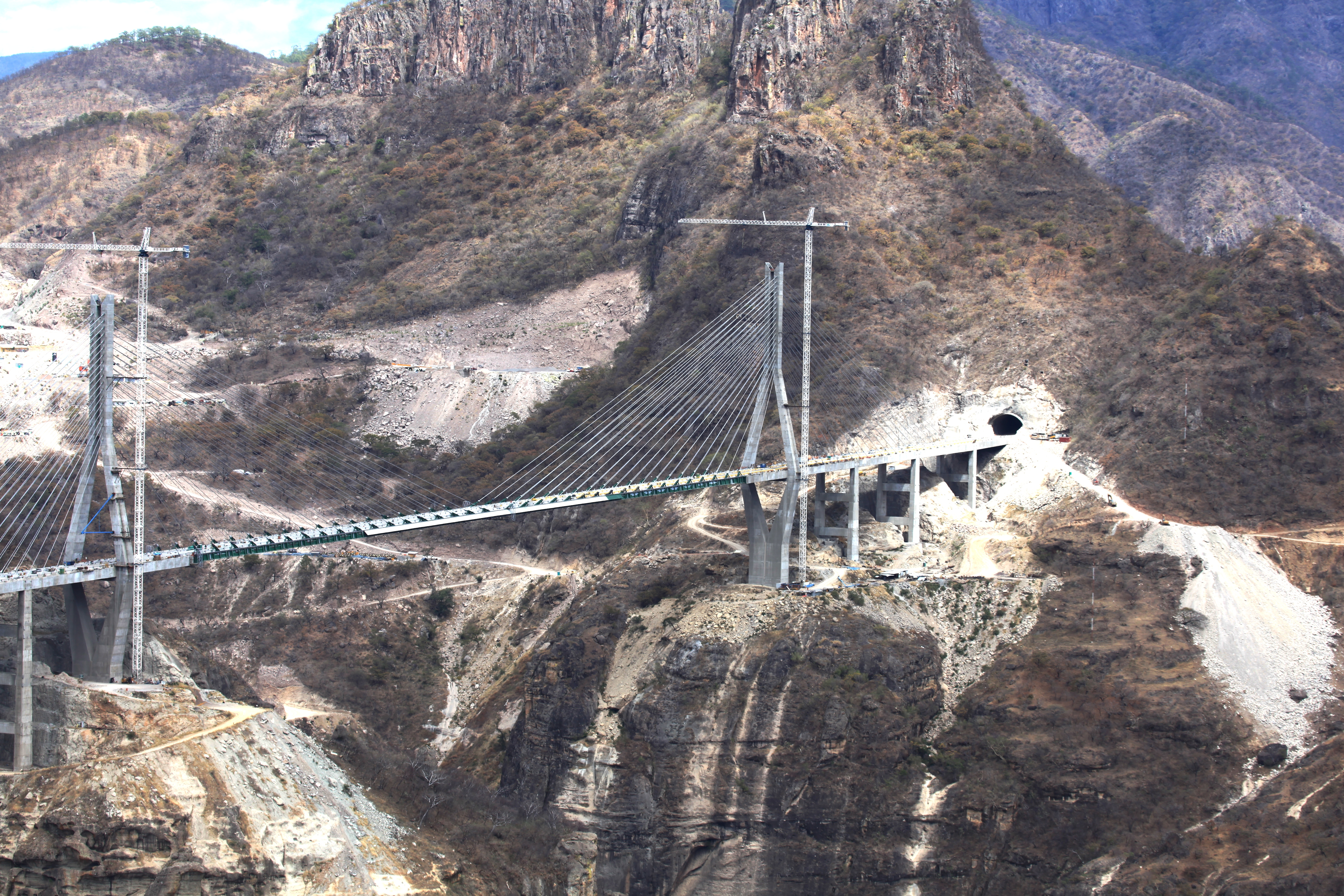

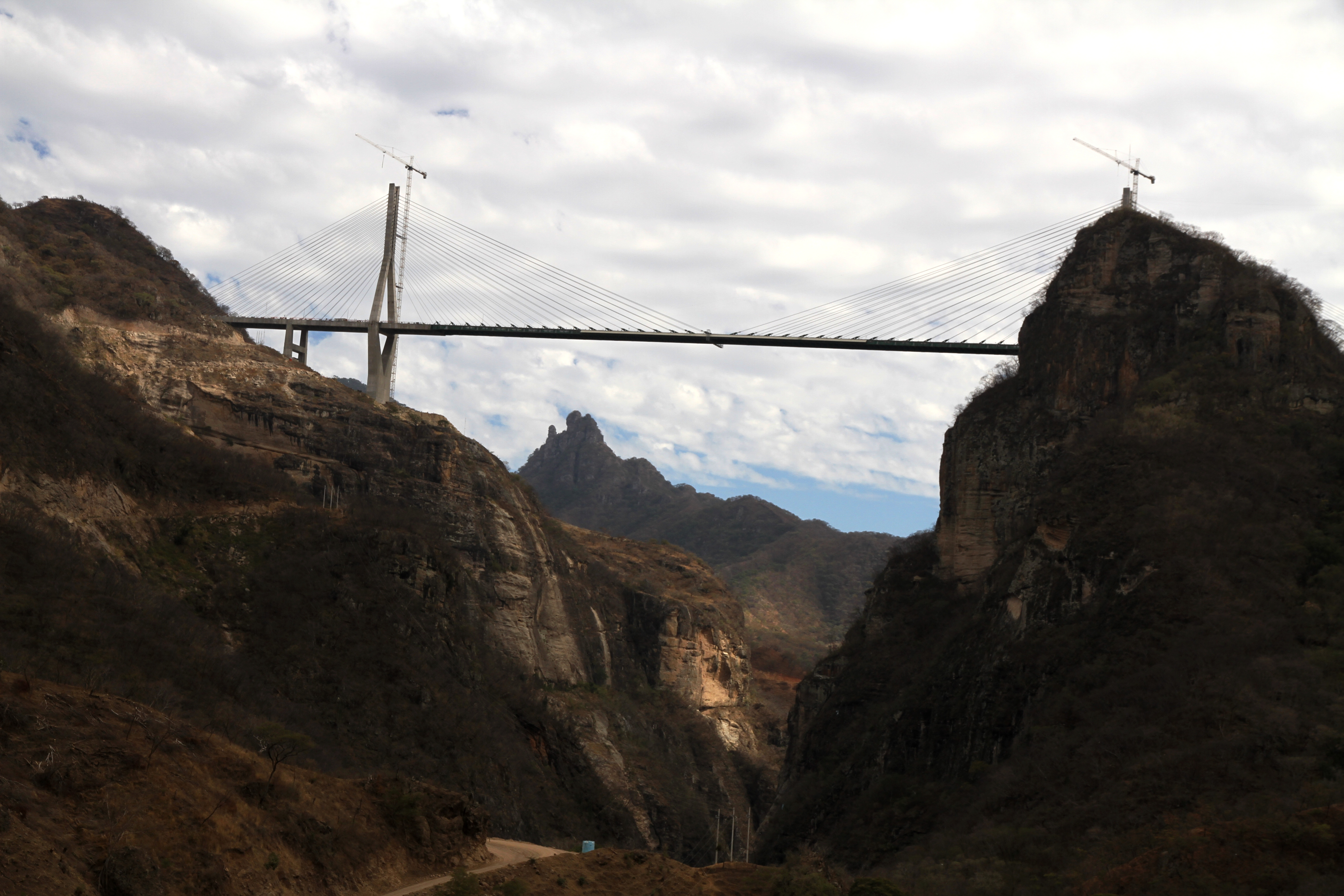

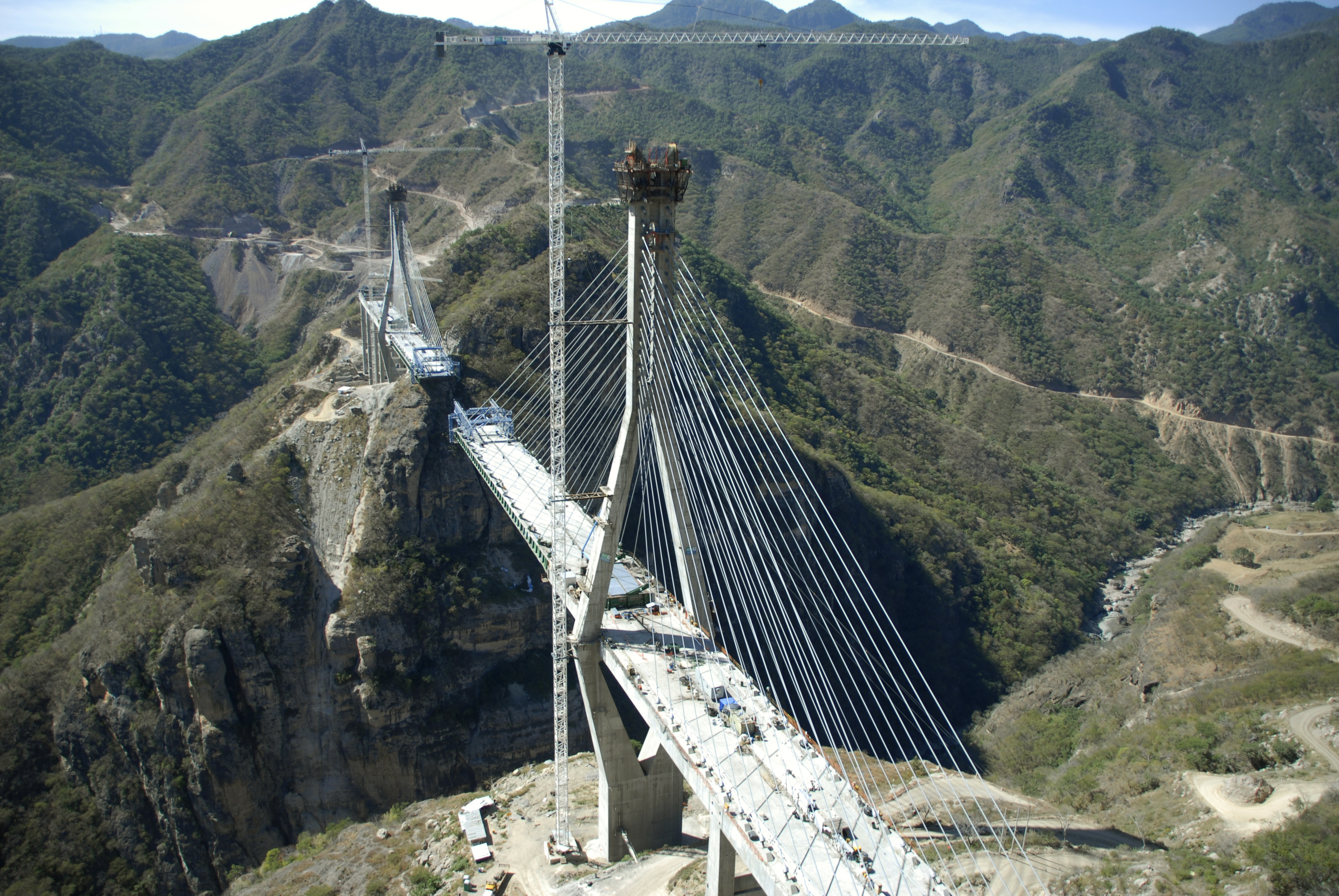

== See also ==
- List of largest cable-stayed bridges
- List of highest bridges in the world
