= Agua Caliente de Gárate =

Town in the Mexican state of Sinaloa

- Town
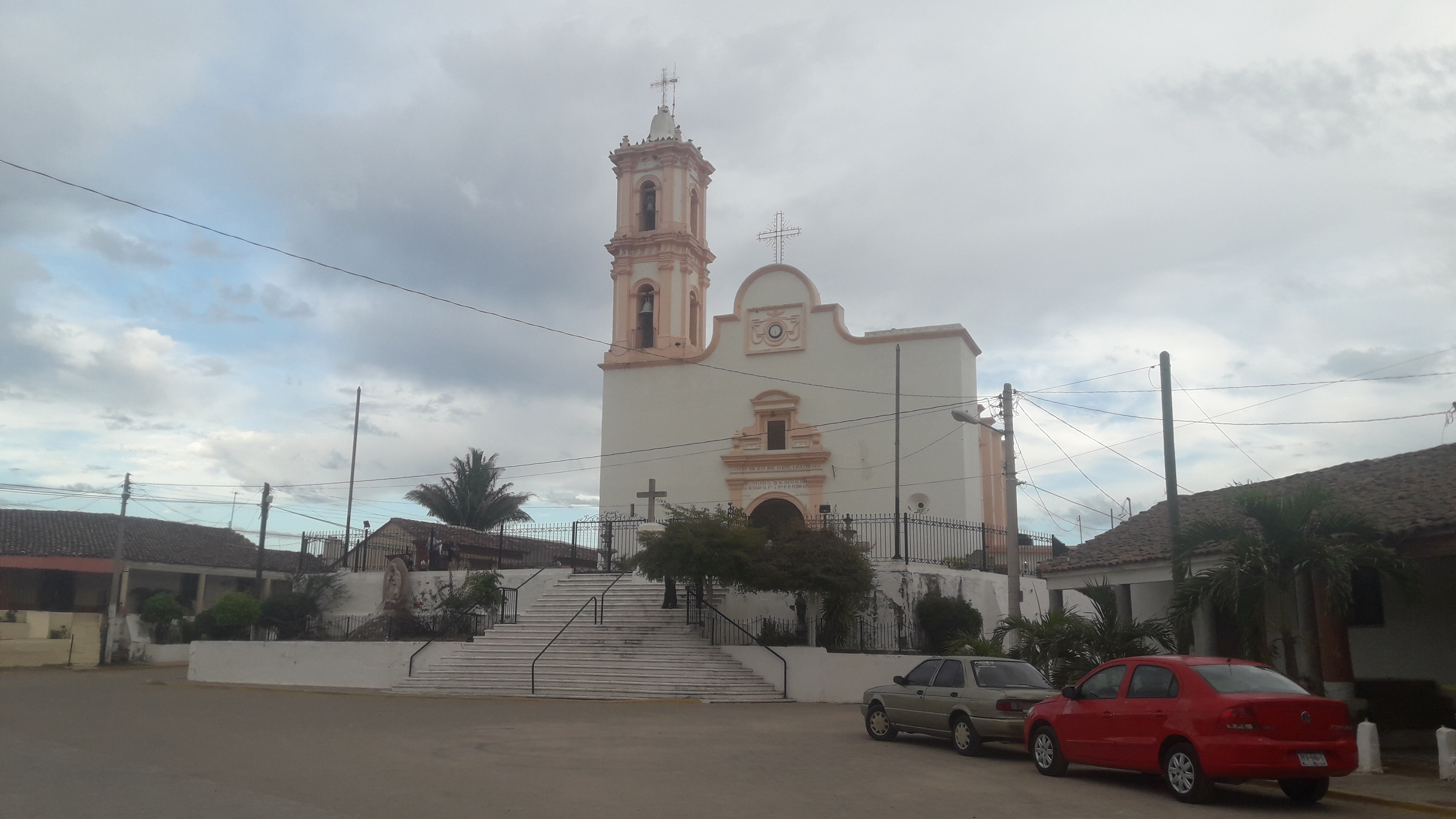
- Parroquia Nuestra Señora de La Candelaria
- Etymology: Spanish language
- Interactive map of Agua Caliente de Gárate
- Coordinates: 23°09′47.2″N 106°05′12.9″W
- Country: Mexico
- State: Sinaloa
- Municipality: Concordia

Population
  - Total: 1,692
  - Ethnicities: Mestizos
  - Religions: Roman Catholic Church
- Time zone: UTC−7 (MST)
- Postal code: 82620
- Area code: 694

Agua Caliente de Gárate is a mexican town located in the boundary of the municipality of Concordia, Sinaloa. It has a population of 1692. It is best known for the local church building located next to the plaza. Like with the rest of Sinaloa, the population is mostly made up of Roman Catholics.
