= Pueblo Nuevo, Durango =

Village in the Mexican state of Durango

Pueblo Nuevo is a village in Pueblo Nuevo Municipality, Durango state, Mexico. It is located on a high plateau more than 8,000 ft (2,500 m) above sea level in the Sierra Madre Occidental.

Before the 1920s, it was the seat of government of the municipality, which subsequently was moved to El Salto due to its more readily accessible location. Especially in its heyday, the village was simply known as La Ciudad to locals, or as La Ciudad de Pueblo Novo to distinguish the ambiguous name "La Ciudad, Durango" from the Ciudad neighborhood in the state capital Durango.

The village is on the new four-lane highway route between Durango and Mazatlán in Sinaloa, and is likely to see expanding tourist traffic due to its proximity to the Baluarte Bridge. As of 2005, the village of Pueblo Nuevo had a total population of 2,837.
