= El Salto, Durango =

City in the Mexican state of Durango

El Salto
- Municipal Seat and city
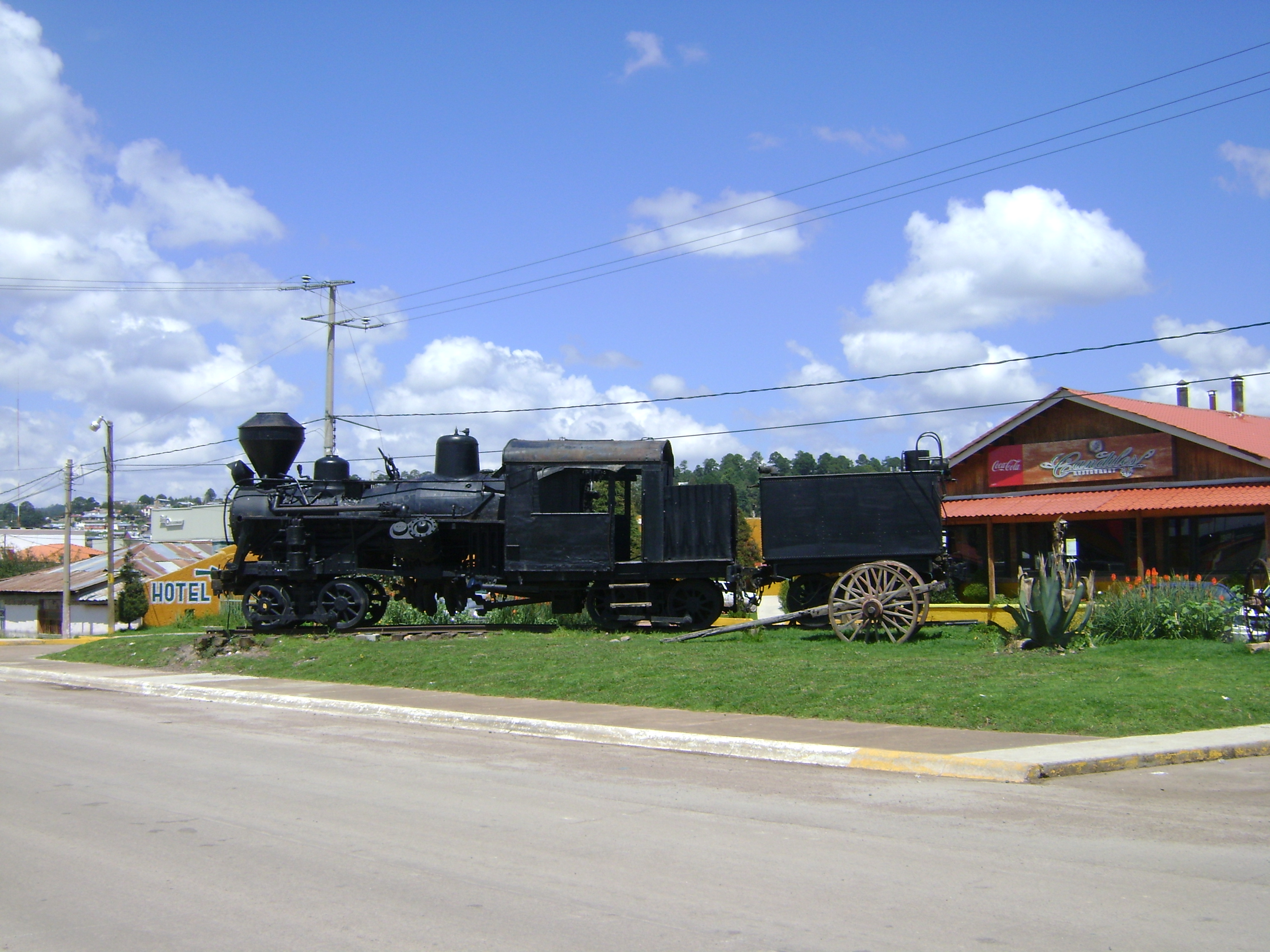
- Locomotive in El Salto

- Location within Durango Location within Mexico
- Coordinates: 23°46′56.424″N 105°21′30.5958″W
- Country: Mexico
- State: Durango
- Municipality: Pueblo Nuevo
- Elevation: 2,580 m (8,460 ft)

Population (2015)
  - Total: 24,241
- Time zone: UTC-6 (Central)
- Postal code: 34950

El Salto is a city and seat of the municipality of Pueblo Nuevo in the southwestern part of the Mexican state of Durango. In 2015, the town had a total population of 24,241, Situated on a pine-forested plateau about 2,580 meters (8,464 feet) above sea level in the Sierra Madre mountain range, the town is home to a large lumber industry. It also has a military base. The surrounding municipality has a population of 50,417 and an area of 6,178.3 km² (2,385.45 sq mi).

== Geography ==
=== Climate ===
El Salto has a subtropical highland climate (Köppen Cwb). Thanks to its location in the high plateau of the Sierra Madre Occidental it receives abundant rain during the summer months; enough for it to avoid the semi-arid (BSk) classification found further inland. Due to its location the town experiences mild but rainy summers, and relatively dry and chilly winters with freezing night temperatures. Winter months witness the occasional snow storm.

Climate data for El Salto (1991-2020), (altitude 2,538 metres or 8,327 feet)
Month	Jan	Feb	Mar	Apr	May	Jun	Jul	Aug	Sep	Oct	Nov	Dec	Year
Record high °C (°F)	29.0 (84.2)	30.0 (86.0)	28.0 (82.4)	33.0 (91.4)	33.0 (91.4)	32.0 (89.6)	30.0 (86.0)	32.0 (89.6)	29.0 (84.2)	29.0 (84.2)	27.0 (80.6)	25.0 (77.0)	33.0 (91.4)
Mean daily maximum °C (°F)	17.0 (62.6)	18.1 (64.6)	20.3 (68.5)	22.3 (72.1)	24.4 (75.9)	25.1 (77.2)	22.9 (73.2)	22.6 (72.7)	21.8 (71.2)	21.5 (70.7)	19.5 (67.1)	17.6 (63.7)	21.1 (70.0)
Daily mean °C (°F)	6.2 (43.2)	7.4 (45.3)	8.8 (47.8)	10.8 (51.4)	13.4 (56.1)	16.2 (61.2)	16.1 (61.0)	15.8 (60.4)	14.9 (58.8)	12.5 (54.5)	9.3 (48.7)	6.9 (44.4)	11.5 (52.7)
Mean daily minimum °C (°F)	−4.7 (23.5)	−3.2 (26.2)	−2.6 (27.3)	−0.8 (30.6)	2.4 (36.3)	7.2 (45.0)	9.2 (48.6)	9.0 (48.2)	8.1 (46.6)	3.5 (38.3)	−0.9 (30.4)	−3.7 (25.3)	2.0 (35.6)
Record low °C (°F)	−14.0 (6.8)	−15.0 (5.0)	−13.0 (8.6)	−12.0 (10.4)	−10.0 (14.0)	−8.0 (17.6)	0.0 (32.0)	−3.0 (26.6)	−4.0 (24.8)	−10.0 (14.0)	−12.0 (10.4)	−15.0 (5.0)	−15.0 (5.0)
Average precipitation mm (inches)	43.0 (1.69)	20.5 (0.81)	14.2 (0.56)	7.2 (0.28)	26.7 (1.05)	157.3 (6.19)	251.7 (9.91)	208.1 (8.19)	162.9 (6.41)	66.8 (2.63)	44.7 (1.76)	29.9 (1.18)	1,033 (40.67)
Average precipitation days (≥ 0.1 mm)	4.0	2.9	2.0	1.9	5.8	17.5	24.8	23.4	17.0	8.0	3.7	3.4	114.4
Source: Servicio Meteorológico National
