= Pueblo Nuevo Municipality, Durango =

Municipality in the Mexican state of Durango

Pueblo Nuevo
- Municipality
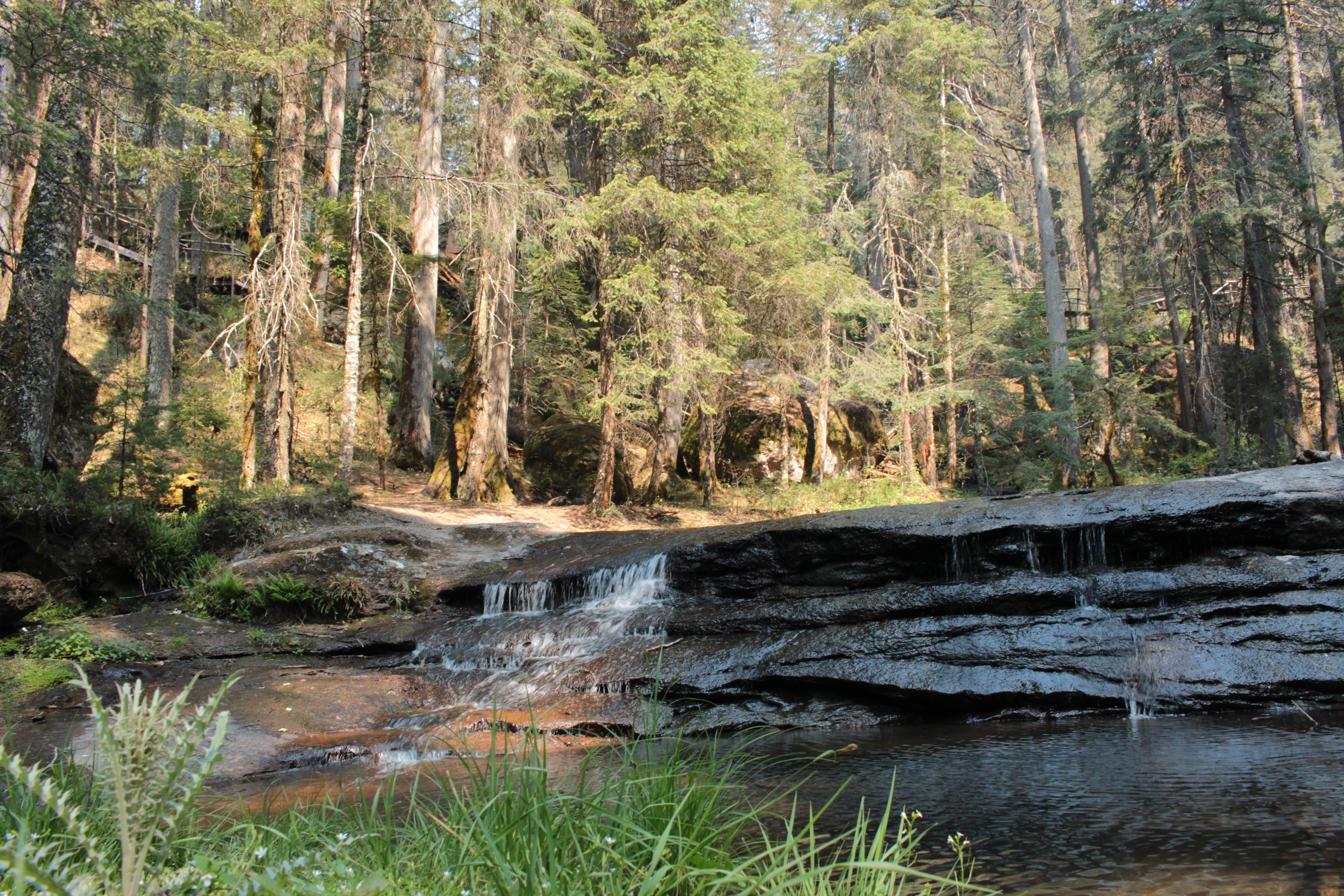
- La Quebrada de Santa Bárbara conservation area is located in Pueblo Nuevo Municipality

- Location in Mexico Pueblo Nuevo (Mexico)
- Coordinates: 23°47′N 105°22′W
- Country: Mexico
- State: Durango
- Municipal seat: El Salto

Area
  - Total: 6,178.3 km^{2} (2,385.5 sq mi)

Population (2010)
  - Total: 49,162
- Time zone: UTC-6 (Central)
- Website: https://www.pueblonuevo.mx/

Pueblo Nuevo is a municipality in the Mexican state of Durango. The municipal seat lies at El Salto. The municipality covers an area of 6178.3 km^{2}.

The village of Pueblo Nuevo was the seat of government of the municipality before the 1920s. The village is on the new four-lane highway route between Durango, Durango, and Mazatlán, Sinaloa, and is likely to see expanding tourist traffic due to its proximity to the Baluarte Bridge.

In 2010, the municipality had a total population of 49,162.

The municipality had 543 localities. As of the 2010 census, the largest are El Salto (24,241), La Ciudad (2,693),San Bernardino de Milpillas Chico,(9,74).
