= Concordia Municipality =

Municipality in the Mexican state of Sinaloa

Concordia Municipality Municipio de Concordia
- Municipality
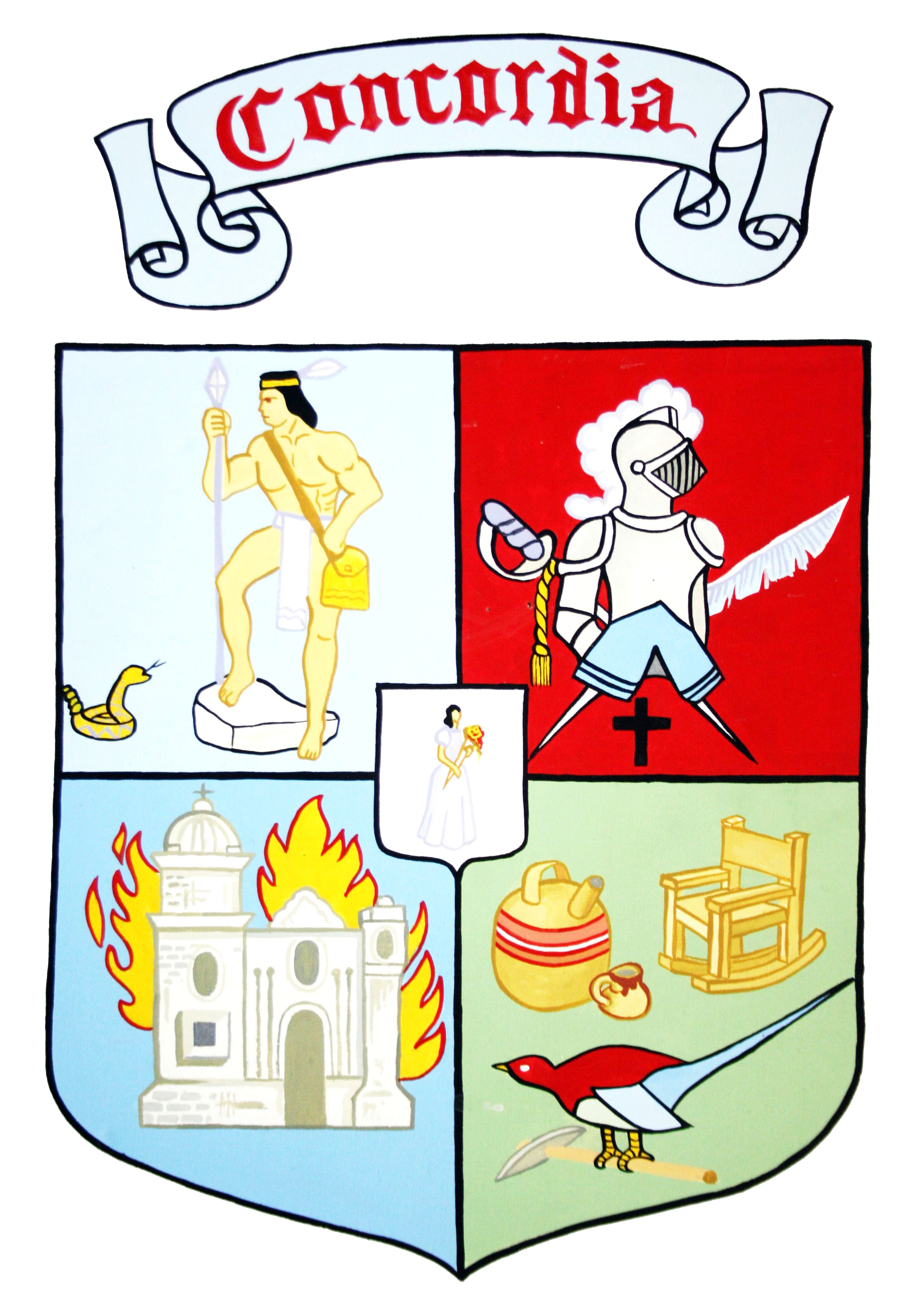
- Coat of arms

- Location of the municipality in Sinaloa
- Coordinates: 23°17′17″N 106°04′02″W
- Country: Mexico
- State: Sinaloa
- Seat: Concordia
- No. of Sindicaturas: 8
- Foundation: 1915

Government
  - Municipal president: José Eligio Medina Ríos

Area
  - Total: 1,524.3 km^{2} (588.5 sq mi)

Population (2010)
  - Total: 28 493
- Time zone: UTC-7 (Mountain Standard Time)
- Website: Official website

Concordia is a municipality in the Mexican state of Sinaloa in northwestern Mexico.

According to the 2010 census it had a population of 28,493 inhabitants.

== Political subdivision ==
Concordia Municipality is subdivided in 8 sindicaturas:

- El Verde
- Santa Lucía
- Mesillas
- Zavala
- Agua Caliente de Gárate
- Pánuco
- Tepuxtla
- Copala
