= Concordia, Sinaloa =

City in the Mexican state of Sinaloa

Concordia Villa de San Sebastián
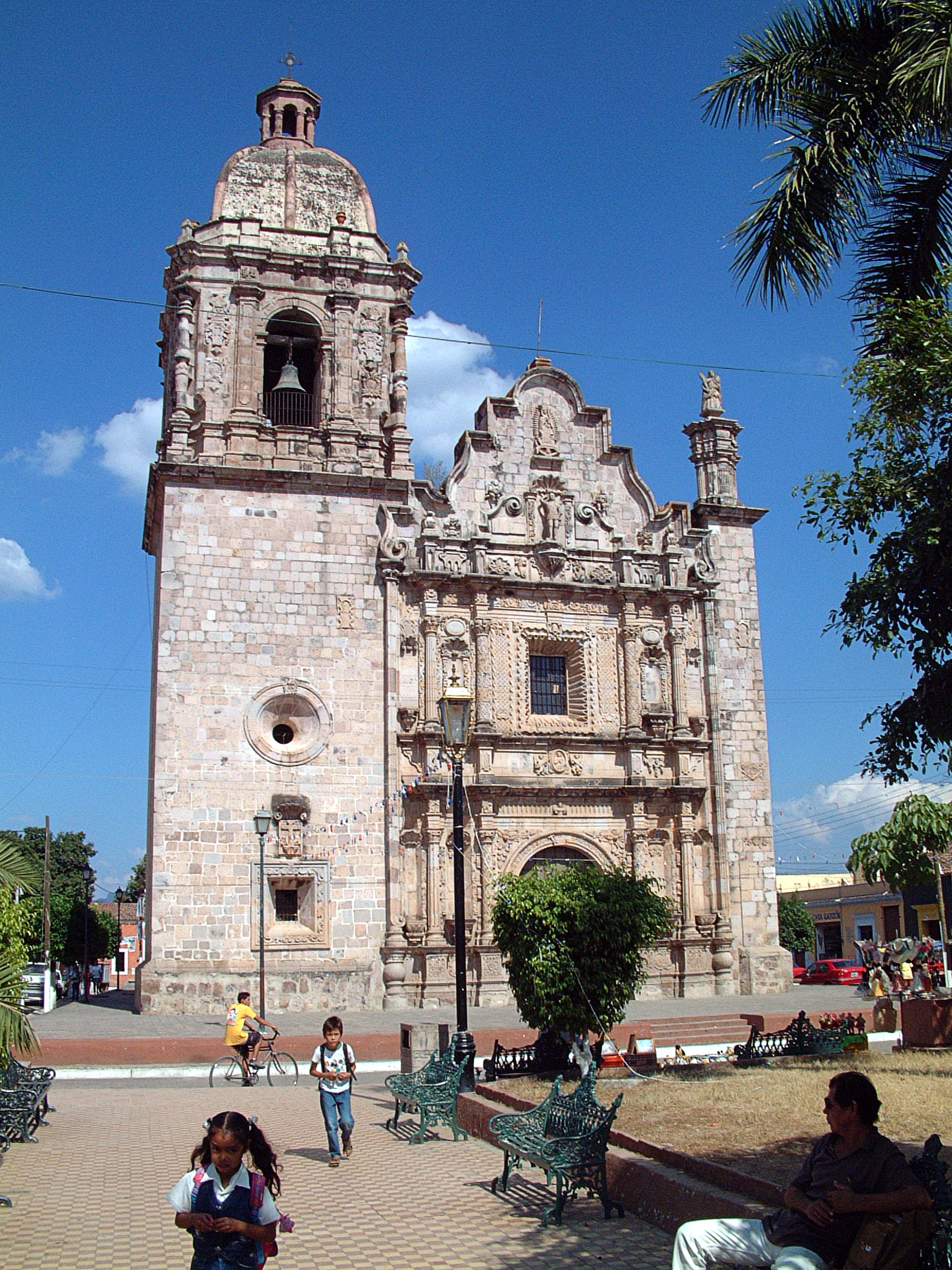
- Colonial church in Concordia

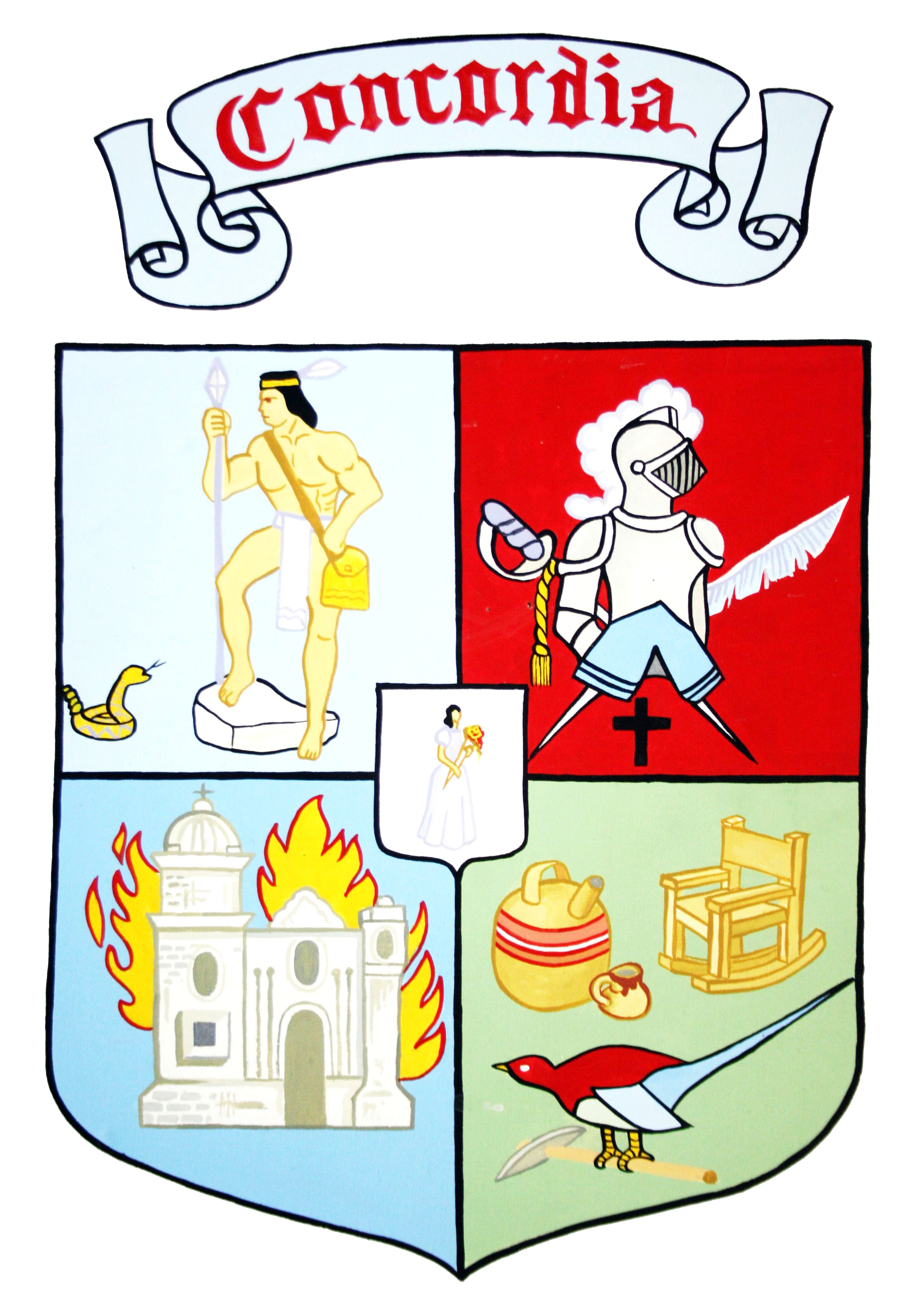
- Seal

- Location in Mexico Concordia (Mexico)
- Coordinates: 23°17′18″N 106°04′03″W
- Country: Mexico
- State: Sinaloa
- Municipality: Concordia
- Founded in: As Villa de San Sebastián: 1565
- Founded by: Francisco de Ibarra

Government
  - Municipal president: José Eligio Medina Ríos

Population (2010)
  - Total: 8,328
- Time zone: UTC-7 (Mountain Standard Time)

Concordia is a city and its surrounding municipality in the Mexican state of Sinaloa. The town is noted for manufacture of artisanal wooden furniture, symbolized by the giant chair in the town plaza. According to 2010 census, it had a population of 8,328 inhabitants.

Founded as Villa de San Sebastián in 1565 by Francisco de Ibarra, Concordia was originally a center of gold, silver and copper mining. The main church, San Sebastián, was built in 1785 with an ornate baroque facade.

Concordia is about an hour's travel southeast of Mazatlán, on the highway to Durango. It stands at 23°17′18″N 106°04′03″W.

Residents of San Jerónimo de El Verde, located 13 km (8.1 mi) from Concordia, protested against water shortages in February 2021. Felipe Garzón López, mayor of Concordia, (PRI) blamed population increases and the drying of artesian wells in El Palmito, Pastoría, Malpica, Amboscada, Huajote, Agua Caliente de Garate, Guásima and El Verde for water shortages. He said the solution is connection to the Picachos Dam and reservoir, as promised by President Andrés Manuel López Obrador in December 2020.

As of February 21, 2021, Concordia has reported 80 infections and 27 deaths related to the COVID-19 pandemic in Mexico that began in March 2020.
