= Mexican Federal Highway 15D =

Toll highway in Mexico

Federal Highway 15D
- Carretera federal 15D
- Mexico 15 International Highway; Mexico-Nogales Highway

Route information
- Maintained by Secretariat of Communications and Transportation
- Length: 1,652 km (1,027 mi)

Major junctions
- North end: SR 189 at the U.S. border in Nogales
- Fed. 2 in Imuris; Fed. 2D in Santa Ana; Fed. 14 in Hermosillo; Fed. 16 in Hermosillo; Fed. 40 in Mazatlán; Fed. 68 in Acaponeta; Fed. 74 in Crucero de San Blas, Nayarit; Fed. 76D near Tepic; Fed. 76 in Tepic; Fed. 200 in Tepic; Fed. 200D near San Cayetano, Nayarit; Fed. 68D near Chapalilla; Fed. 70D in Jala; Fed. GUA 10D in El Arenal; Fed. 70 in El Arenal; Fed. 23 / Fed. 44 / Fed. 54 / Fed. 54D in Guadalajara; Fed. 80 / Fed. 90 in Guadalajara; Fed. 90D in Zapotlanejo; Fed. GUA 10D in Zapotlanejo; Fed. 35 / Fed. 71 / Fed. 110 in La Barca; Fed. 61 / Fed. 120 near Maravatio; Fed. 57 near Atlacomulco; Fed. 55 / Fed. 55D / Fed. M40D in Atlacomulco
- South end: Fed. 57D in Mexico City

Location
- Country: Mexico

Highway system
- Mexican Federal Highways; List; Autopistas
← Fed. 15	→ Fed. 16

Federal Highway 15D (Carretera Federal 15D) is the name for toll highways paralleling Federal Highway 15. The toll segments of Highway 15D include some of the most significant highways in the country along the Nogales-Mexico City corridor. The highway is the southern terminus of the CANAMEX Corridor, a trade corridor that stretches from Mexico north across the United States to the Canadian province of Alberta.

Two segments of Federal Highway 15D (México-La Marquesa and Guadalajara-Tepic) are among the top five most expensive toll roads in Mexico, according to a 2016 analysis by Carmatch.

== Sonora ==
=== Estación Don-Nogales and bypasses ===
Carretera Estación Don-Nogales
- Location: Future I-11 / SR 189 at the Nogales-Mariposa Port of Entry to Fed. 15D at Estación Don
- Length: 652 km (405 mi)

With 652 kilometres (405 mi) of length, Highway 15D's segment in Sonora, formerly known as Estación Don-Nogales, runs the length of the state of Sonora and includes access to most of the state's major population centers. Estación Don is an abandoned railway station in the southernmost point of the state, part of Huatabampo Municipality. The highway is maintained by Caminos y Puentes Federales, which charges cars 340 pesos to travel the length of the road, including its four bypasses of Nogales (12.5 kilometres (7.8 mi)), Magdalena de Kino (6.57 kilometres (4.08 mi), 25 pesos), Guaymas (21.5 kilometres (13.4 mi), 31 pesos) and, Hermosillo (40.1 kilometres (24.9 mi)).

Highway 15 is free between Nogales and Magdalena de Kino and from Hermosillo to Guaymas, but between Guaymas and Ciudad Obregón, and from Ciudad Obregón to Los Mochis, Sinaloa, cars are tolled for intercity transit, and unlike with most of the country's toll roads (which are completely bypassed by non-toll highways), there are no non-toll alternatives to Highway 15D through much of Sonora.

=== Libramiento de Ciudad Obregón ===
In 2014, a concession was awarded to GIA+A and Invex Infraestructura to build a 34.2-kilometre (21.3 mi) bypass of Ciudad Obregón, which circles around the city to the north and east. The first portion of the highway opened in October 2017. This bypass is operated by OCACSA, and cars pay $155 pesos to use it.

=== Libramiento de Hermosillo ===
In 2015, a consortium of IDINSA, Constructora MAS and PRIMEX was selected to build a bypass of Hermosillo, with an expected completion date at the end of 2017. More recent estimates place completion in mid-2018. This is now open since May 9, 2019 although portions are 2 lanes. Northbound, southbound, and through-traffic toll booths are all located at the junction with Sonora State Highway 20 ( also known as Carretera a Sahuaripa) allowing bypass traffic to enter or exit the city at an intermediate point. Toll prices vary depending on which segment of the road is used. Through traffic cars pay $154 pesos.

== Sinaloa: Culiacán to Mazatlán ==
Autopista Culiacán-Mazatlán
- Location: Costa Rica, Sinaloa, to Venadillo, Sinaloa
- Length: 190.26 km (118.22 mi)

Travelers on Highway 15 get their next opportunity to take a toll road west of Guamúchil, where Sinaloa State Highway 1D forms. Highway 1D does not take on the federal designation until west of Culiacán, at which time the Autopista Mazatlán-Culiacán, operated by IDEAL, begins. IDEAL operates the stretches that form Highway 15D between Culiacán and Guadalajara. Travelers can access the road via the Libramiento de Culiacán, which begins at Highway 1D and costs 30 pesos for cars, or by heading south on Av. Jesús Kumate within Culiacán. The two roads meet at Costa Rica, taking a southeast trajectory past La Cruz de Elota, Dimas and Mármol toward Mazatlán. Two toll plazas, Costa Rica and Mármol, charge 130 and 116 pesos, respectively, with the total cost of the road being 246 pesos.

North of Mazatlán, this highway ends, and motorists can enter the city or continue along the Libramiento de Mazatlán, also operated by IDEAL. The bypass is 32 kilometres (20 mi) in length, with eight interchanges and provision for two additional spurs, as well as one oasis; it costs 44 pesos to drive. East of Villa Unión, Highway 15D serves as the western terminus of Mexican Federal Highway 40D to Durango.

== Mazatlán, Sinaloa to Tepic, Nayarit ==
Autopista Tepic-Mazatlán
- Location: Fed. 40 in Villa Unión, Sinaloa to Fed. 15D in Tepic, Nayarit
- Length: 238.3 km (148.1 mi)

Exiting the Mazatlán area and Villa Unión, Highway 15D heads for Tepic, Nayarit, passing El Rosario and Escuinapa before entering Nayarit west of Acaponeta. Cars pay a toll of 480 pesos to travel between Mazatlán and Tepic.

The Mazatlán-Tepic highway was constructed in multiple phases, all but one completed prior to the current concession and two built by the Secretariat of Communications and Transportation. The first segment to open was the connection between Tepic and the exit to San Blas, completed in 1990; the 151.8 kilometres (94.3 mi) between the San Blas exit and Escuinapa was completed between 2005 and 2007 by concessionaire Carreteras, Autopistas y Libramientos de la República Mexicana.

== Tepic, Nayarit to Guadalajara, Jalisco ==
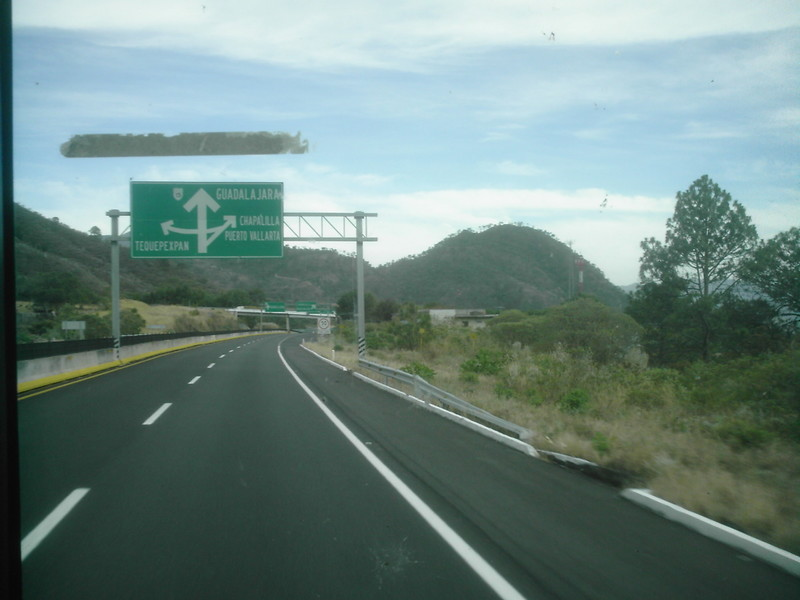
Highway 15D southbound approaches the Tequepexpan interchange and toll booth, with access to Chapalilla and Mexican Federal Highway 68D

Autopista Guadalajara-Tepic
- Location: Fed. 15D in Tepic, Nayarit to Fed. 15D near Guadalajara, Jalisco
- Length: 168.6 km (104.8 mi)

Highway 15D continues its trajectory toward Tepic. It has interchanges at Nayarit State Highway 68 to Acaponeta and Tecuala before entering the Tepic area. Entering Tepic from the northwest, travelers have the option to enter the city and merge with Highway 15 or to take the Libramiento de Tepic; they also can access the new toll road to San Blas. The Libramiento de Tepic was formally inaugurated by President Enrique Peña Nieto in February 2017 and costs cars 55 pesos to travel.

At the southeast edge of Tepic, the road intersects an access to Tepic, with provision for a future connection to the south. Highway 15D proceeds past Ixtlán del Río east toward Jalisco, ending at non-toll Highway 15 west of Guadalajara. This stretch costs cars 383 pesos.

== Zapotlanejo, Jalisco to Maravatío, Michoacán ==
Carretera Zapotlanejo-Maravatío
- Location: Fed. 90D at Zapotlanejo, Jalisco to Fed. 15D / Fed. 61 / Fed. 120 in Maravatío, Michoacán
- Length: 311.38 km (193.48 mi)

The Highway 15D designation returns east of Guadalajara, with a new toll road operator, Red de Carreteras de Occidente, a consortium of Empresas ICA and Goldman Sachs which was awarded a package of various operating highways in 2007. The RCO stretch begins at Mexican Federal Highway 90D near Zapotlanejo, intersecting the Macrolibramiento Sur De Guadalajara. Heading east, Highway 15D provides access to Ocotlán and La Barca before crossing into Michoacán. In Michoacán, Highway 15D provides access to Ecuandureo, Churintzio, Panindícuaro and Huaniqueo. Skirting the southern shore of Cuitzeo Lake, Highway 15D encounters three major interchanges leading to Michoacán's major cities. Mexican Federal Highway 14D begins at Copándaro and leads to Pátzcuaro, Uruapan and Lázaro Cárdenas; Mexican Federal Highway 43D leads south to Morelia and north to Salamanca, Guanajuato; and Highway 48D serves as a toll road connecting Morelia and Highway 15D with access to the Morelia International Airport. Heading east, it meets Mexican Federal Highway 120 at Zinapécuaro before the RCO segment ends at Maravatío.

The Zapotlanejo-Maravatío highway was Mexico's most expensive toll road in 2013. It currently costs cars 566 pesos to travel from Zapotlanejo to Maravatío, divided among four major toll zones.

== Maravatío, Michoacán to Atlacomulco, State of Mexico and future extension to Atizapán ==
Carretera Maravatío-Atlacomulco
- Location: Fed. 15D / Fed. 61 / Fed. 120 in Maravatío, Michoacán to Fed. 55 / Fed. 55D / Fed. M40D at Atlacomulco, State of Mexico
- Length: 64 km (40 mi)

OCACSA picks up maintenance of Highway 15D at Maravatío and runs the road for 64 kilometres (40 mi); it enters the State of Mexico near Temascalcingo, proceeding east to an interchange with federal highways 55, M40D (Arco Norte) north of Atlacomulco. To continue to Mexico City, traffic must take Highway 55D south to Toluca. The Atlacomulco interchange includes a provision for an eastern extension, which will connect Atlacomulco to Atizapán in the Mexico City metropolitan area. The concession for this 74-kilometre (46 mi) segment, which would connect it to the Autopista Chamapa-Lechería, was awarded to OHL in 2014; it was originally slated to open in April 2016, but has faced delays due to issues acquiring right of way and resultant environmental delays. It is currently scheduled to open in the first half of 2018.

== Toluca to Mexico City ==
Carretera México-La Marquesa-Toluca (Lerma)
- Location: Fed. 15D near Lerma, State of Mexico to Fed. 15D / Fed. 57D in Mexico City
- Length: 34 km (21 mi)

One last stretch of Highway 15D finishes the connection to Mexico City, connecting Toluca/Lerma to Mexico City via La Marquesa and closely paralleling non-toll Highway 15 with access to the Autopista Chamapa-La Venta, as well as to the Santa Fe area of Mexico City, before merging with Paseo de la Reforma. Both segments are operated by PINFRA.

The Mexico City-La Marquesa toll road was the third-most expensive per kilometer in 2016, with drivers paying 74 pesos to access the 22-kilometre (14 mi) highway (3.36 pesos per kilometer). The La Marquesa-Toluca segment, inaugurated by President Peña Nieto in July 2016, is even more expensive; it costs drivers 50 pesos to travel 12 kilometres (7.5 mi), or 3.76 pesos per kilometer.
