= Mexican Federal Highway 44 =

Highway in Mexico

Federal Highway 44
- Carretera federal 44

Route information
- Maintained by Secretariat of Communications and Transportation

Fresnillo- Guadalajara
- Length: 90 km (56 mi)
- East end: Fed. 45 in Fresnillo
- Major intersections: Fed. 23 in Fresnillo
- East end: Fed. 15 / Fed. 15D / Fed. 54 / Fed. 54D in Guadalajara

Guadalajara-Chapala
- Length: 30 km (19 mi)
- East end: Fed. 70 / Fed. 80 / Fed. 90 in Guadalajara
- Major intersections: Fed. 35 in ixtlahuacan de los Membrillos Fed. GUA 10D in ixtlahuacan de los Membrillos
- West end: Fed. 23 in Chapala

Location
- Country: Mexico

Highway system
- Mexican Federal Highways; List; Autopistas
← Fed. 43	→ Fed. 45

Federal Highway 44 ( La Carretera Federal 44 ) (Fed. 44) is a free (libre) part of the federal highways corridors (los corredores carreteros federales) of Mexico.
