= Macrolibramiento Sur de Guadalajara =

Toll highway in Mexico

Federal Highway GUA 10D
- Carretera federal GUA 10D
- Macrolibramiento Sur De Guadalajara; Southern Superbypass of Guadalajara

Route information
- Maintained by Secretariat of Communications and Transportation
- Length: 111 km (69 mi)
- Existed: July 14, 2016 (Opened first segment) January 8, 2017 (Completely inaugurated)–present

Major junctions
- East end: Fed. 15D at El Arenal
- Fed. 70 near Tala; Fed. 15 / Fed. 54 / Fed. 54D / Fed. 80 near Tlajomulco de Zuniga; Fed. 44 in Ixtlahuacan de los Membrillos; Fed. 35 in Ixtlahuacan de los Membrillos; Fed. 15D near Zapotlanejo
- West end: Fed. 80D / Fed. 90D near Zapotlanejo

Location
- Country: Mexico
- State: Jalisco

Highway system
- Mexican Federal Highways; List; Autopistas

The Macrolibramiento Sur de Guadalajara (Southern Superbypass of Guadalajara), designated and signed as Federal Highway GUA 10D, is a toll road in Mexico. It serves as a bypass around Greater Guadalajara and currently links the Guadalajara–Tepic toll road (Mexican Federal Highway 15D) on the west with the Guadalajara–Lagos de Moreno toll road (Mexican Federal Highway 80D) to the east. The highway opened in its entirety in November 2017; it was formally inaugurated on January 8, 2018, by President Enrique Peña Nieto. As of 2018, the toll for the 111-kilometre (69 mi) stretch of highway is 299 pesos.

== Criticism ==
In 2018, upon the road's inauguration, the president of the National Confederation of Mexican Shippers, Manuel Sánchez Benavides, described the new bypass as expensive, lacking basic services, and unsafe, particularly between Tlajomulco and Zapotlanejo, where 17 attacks on vehicles had been recorded in just five days.
