= Mexican Federal Highway 90D =

Toll highway in Mexico

Federal Highway 90D
- Carretera federal 90D
- Autopista Zapotlanejo-Guadalajara

Route information
- Maintained by Red de Carreteras de Occidente
- Length: 26 km (16 mi)

Major junctions
- West end: Fed. 80 in Tlaquepaque, Jalisco
- Fed. 15D in Tonala, Jalisco
- East end: Fed. 80D / Fed. 90 / Fed. GUA 10D in Zapotlanejo, Jalisco

Location
- Country: Mexico
- State: Jalisco

Highway system
- Mexican Federal Highways; List; Autopistas

Federal Highway 90D is a toll highway between Zapotlanejo and Guadalajara, Jalisco. The road is operated by Red de Carreteras de Occidente, which charges cars 70 pesos to travel Highway 90D. RCO operates the segments of Mexican Federal Highway 15D and Mexican Federal Highway 80D that connect into the road.
