= Mexican Federal Highway 70D =

Toll highways in Mexico

Federal Highway 70D
- Carretera federal 70D

Route information
- Maintained by Caminos y Puentes Federales
- Existed: October 1, 2013 (Ríoverde-Ciudad Valles)–present

Autopista Ríoverde - Ciudad Valles - Tamuín
- Length: 117.6 km (73.1 mi)
- West end: Fed. 70 in Rayón, San Luis Potosí
- Major intersections: Fed. 85 south of Ciudad Valles, San Luis Potosí
- East end: Fed. 70 east of Tamuín, San Luis Potosí

Libramiento Poniente de Tampico (Maxi Libramiento Tampico)
- Length: 13.6 km (8.5 mi)
- North end: Fed. 80 in Altamira, Tamaulipas
- South end: Fed. 70 in Tampico, Tamaulipas

Autopista Guadalajara-Puerto Vallarta (Red Via Corta a Puerto Vallarta)
- Length: 184.0 km (114.3 mi)
- West end: Fed. 15D in Jala, Nayarit
- Major intersections: Fed. 15 in Ahuacatlan, Nayarit Fed. 200D near Mazatan, Nayarit Fed. 200 near Las Varas, Nayarit
- East end: Fed. 200 near Puerto Vallarta, Jalisco

Location
- Country: Mexico

Highway system
- Mexican Federal Highways; List; Autopistas

Federal Highway 70D is the designation for toll highways paralleling Mexican Federal Highway 70.

== San Luis Potosí ==
The 68.5 kilometres (42.6 mi) of the highway from Ríoverde to Ciudad Valles, and another 49.1 kilometres (30.5 mi) connecting Ciudad Valles to Tamuín while bypassing both cities, form Highway 70D in San Luis Potosí, legally known as Rayón-Entronque Tamuín. The former segment entered service on October 1, 2013; the latter was formally opened on July 6, 2016.

== Libramiento Poniente de Tampico ==
The 13.6 kilometres (8.5 mi) is second segment of Highway 70D is located in Tamaulipas. It is also known as the Libramiento Poniente de Tampico (Tampico Western Bypass) or the Maxi Libramiento Tampico. The road is operated by Caminos y Puentes Federales, which charges a toll of 26 pesos per car to travel the full length of Highway 70D.

== Autopista Guadalajara-Puerto Vallarta (Red Via Corta a Puerto Vallarta) ==
The 184.0 kilometres (114.3 mi) is the 3rd segment of the Highway 70D it Will serve to bypass Mexican Federal Highway 68D so it can cut time to Puerto Vallarta from 4 hrs to 1 hr 30 min. The total cost of the segment is 134 pesos To ride Completely. From Jala to Compostela the 55.1 kilometres (34.2 mi) road is open and fully operational since February 13, 2017. The rest of the Highway from Compostela and Las Vartas to Puerto Vallarta is under construction, this 128.9 kilometres (80.1 mi) stretch has no set opening date due to the delays of construction since it does not have the necessary environmental and right-of-way permits issued by the SEMARNAT and the SCT and also, due to lack of resources from the public budget caused by the COVID-19 pandemic.

The Highway is maintained by three different operators. First, the 55.1 kilometres (34.2 mi) Jala to Compostela road stretch is Maintained by OCACSA. Second, the under construction and unopened 128.9 kilometres (80.1 mi) stretch or road from Compostela to Puerto Vallarta will be maintained by CAPUFE from Compostela to Las Varas. Finally, from Las Varas to Puerto Vallarta it will be maintained by Autopista Las Varas - Puerto Vallarta S.A. de C.V. a subsidiary of Impulsora del Desarrollo Económico de América Latina (IDEAL) owned by Carlos Slim and his company Grupo Carso.
