= Mexican Federal Highway 41 =

Highway in Mexico

Federal Highway 41
- Carretera federal 41

Route information
- Maintained by Secretariat of Communications and Transportation
- Length: 67 km (42 mi)

Major junctions
- North end: Fed. 37 in Manuel Doblado
- Fed. 84 in Zapote de Adjuntas, Guanajuato
- South end: Fed. 90 in Munguia, Guanajuato

Location
- Country: Mexico
- State: Guanajuato

Highway system
- Mexican Federal Highways; List; Autopistas
← Fed. 40	→ Fed. 43

Federal Highway 41 (Carretera Federal 41) (Fed. 41) is a free (libre) part of the federal highways corridors (los corredores carreteros federales)of Mexico. The highway starts in the west at a junction with Fed37 about 10.6 km (6.6 mi) south-southwest of Manuel Doblado, Guanajuato. The highway travels east-northeast for 30 km (19 mi) before heading mostly south for 11.7 km (7.3 mi) toward Cuerámaro. From Cuerámaro, FH 41 travels 28 km (17 mi) east-southeast until reaching its eastern terminus at Fed. 90 in the locale of Munguia, Guanajuato. The highway's eastern terminus is 12.5 km (7.8 mi) southwest of Irapuato, Guanajuato.
