= Mexican Federal Highway 14D =

Toll highway in Mexico

Federal Highway 14D
- Carretera federal 14D
- Autopista Cuitzeo-Pátzcuaro; Autopista Pátzcuaro-Uruapan; Autopista Siglo XXI

Route information
- Maintained by Autopistas Michoacán
- Length: 124.1 km (77.1 mi)

Major junctions
- East end: Fed. 15D in Copándaro, Michoacán
- Fed. 15 at Capula, Michoacán; Fed. 37 east of Uruapan, Michoacán
- West end: Fed. 37D near Uruapan, Michoacán

Location
- Country: Mexico
- State: Michoacán

Highway system
- Mexican Federal Highways; List; Autopistas
← Fed. 14	→ Fed. 15

Federal Highway 14D is a toll highway in the state of Michoacán. It connects Highway 15D at Cuitzeo to 37D and Uruapan via the city of Pátzcuaro. The road is operated by Autopistas de Michoacán, which charges cars 171 pesos to travel Highway 14D from Cuitzeo to Uruapan and 478 pesos when combined with Highway 37D to Lázaro Cárdenas.

Highway 14D from Pátzcuaro southwest, along with Highway 37D, are together referred to as the Autopista Siglo XXI.

== History ==
The segment from Cuitzeo to Pátzcuaro, bypassing the major city of Morelia, was formally opened by President Enrique Peña Nieto on October 20, 2016, after construction had started in 2012 and six months after opening to traffic on April 14. The concession for this 64.1-kilometre (39.8 mi) segment is held by PINFRA, Blackrock, AZVI and Sociedad Michoacana.
