= Mexican Federal Highway 83 =

Highway in Mexico

Federal Highway 83
- Carretera federal 83

Route information
- Maintained by Secretariat of Communications and Transportation
- Length: 94.3 km (58.6 mi)

Major junctions
- North end: Fed. 85 north of Ciudad Victoria
- Fed. 101 / Fed. 180 / Fed. 70
- South end: Fed. 81 in Ignacio Zaragoza

Location
- Country: Mexico

Highway system
- Mexican Federal Highways; List; Autopistas
← Fed. 82	→ Fed. 84

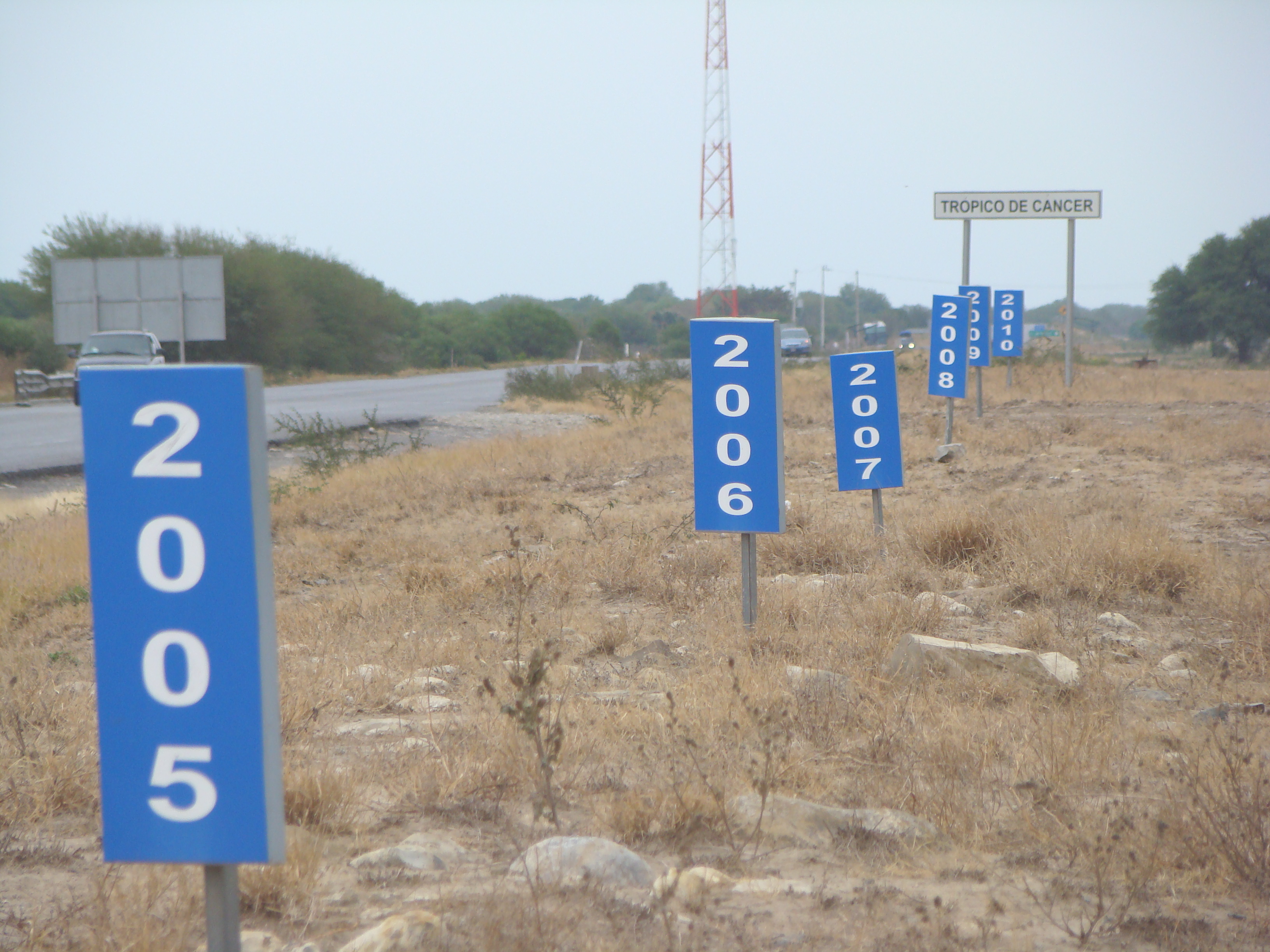
Carretera 83 (Vía Corta) Zaragoza-Victoria, km 27+800, with signs showed the crossings of the Tropic of Cancer and the annual drift between the years 2005 and 2010.In 2025, the signs no longer exist.

Federal Highway 83 (Carretera Federal 83) is a Federal Highway of Mexico. The highway travels from its northern junction with Mexican Federal Highway 85 (25.2 km / 15.7 mi north of Ciudad Victoria) to Ignacio Zaragoza, Tamaulipas to the south at the junction with Mexican Federal Highway 81.
