= Mexican Federal Highway 80D =

Toll highway in Mexico

Federal Highway 80D
- Carretera federal 80D

Route information
- Maintained by Secretariat of Communications and Transportation

Autopista Zapotlanejo-Lagos de Moreno
- Length: 118.91 km (73.89 mi)
- East end: Fed. 80 at El Desperdicio, Jalisco
- Major intersections: Fed. 80 north of Tepatitlán de Morelos, Jalisco
- West end: Fed. 90 / Fed. 90D / Fed. GUA 10D in Zapotlanejo, Jalisco

Autopista Lagos de Moreno-San Luis Potosí
- East end: Fed. 80 at Villa de Arriaga, San Luis Potosí
- Major intersections: Fed. 80 at Villa de Arriaga, San Luis Potosí; Fed. 51 at Ocampo, Guanajuato
- West end: Fed. 80 northeast of Lagos de Moreno, Jalisco

Libramiento Norte de San Patricio-Melaque
- East end: Fed. 80 near San Patricio, Jalisco
- West end: Fed. 80 / Fed. 200 in Barra de Navidad, Jalisco

Location
- Country: Mexico

Highway system
- Mexican Federal Highways; List; Autopistas

Federal Highway 80D is the designation for toll highways paralleling Mexican Federal Highway 80. There are two such roads, one between Zapotlanejo and Lagos de Moreno, Jalisco and the other connecting Lagos de Moreno to San Luis Potosí City.

== Zapotlanejo-Lagos de Moreno ==
The 118.91-kilometre (73.89 mi) road is operated by Red de Carreteras de Occidente, which charges a toll of 70 pesos per car to travel its full length.

A connection east of the northern terminus on Highway 80 transfers motorists directly to Mexican Federal Highway 45D (León-Aguascalientes). This stretch opened in 2014.

== Lagos de Moreno-San Luis Potosí ==
The 78-kilometre (48 mi) highway between Lagos de Moreno and San Luis Potosí was completed in 2012. Its concession is held by FONADIN, and the road is operated by Caminos y Puentes Federales which charges cars 95 pesos to use the road.

== Libramiento Norte de San Patricio-Melaque ==
The 9.7-kilometre (6.0 mi) Road is complete but it is charging 10 pesos to Ride in its entirety It provides a better option to ride for people traveling from Autlan de Navarro to Manzanillo without having to cross the town of San patricio and Barra de Navidad it reduces traffic on Mexican Federal Highway 80 and Mexican Federal Highway 200 bettwen both towns.
