= Monumento a los Constructores =

Partly-destroyed sculpture in Morelia, Michoacán

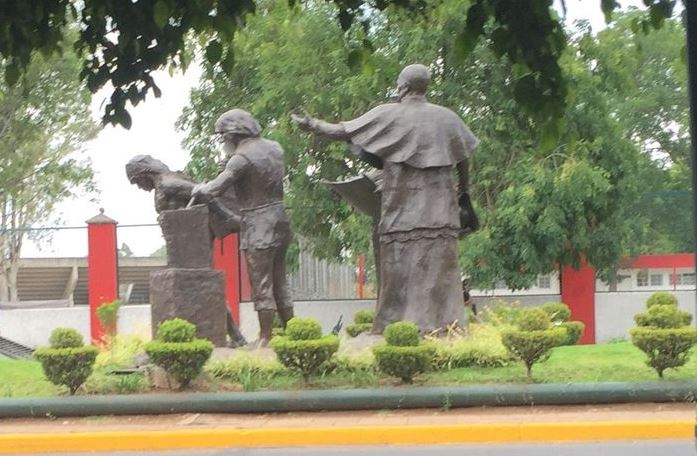
- The monument in 2016
- Location
- Artist: José Luis Padilla Retana
- Year: 1995
- Medium: Bronze
- Weight: 8 t (7.9 long tons; 8.8 short tons)
- Condition: Partly destroyed
- Location: Morelia; 19°41′48.1″N 101°10′6.2″W

The Monumento a los Constructores (lit. transl. Builders Monument), also known as the Monumento a los Constructores de la Ciudad (lit. transl. Builders of the City Monument), is a partially destroyed outdoor bronze monument installed along Acueducto Avenue, in the historic center of Morelia, Michoacán, Mexico. José Luis Padilla Retana created the artwork and the city unveiled it in May 1995 to honor of those who built the city.

The monument originally depicted four men: a New Spain master builder and friar Antonio de San Miguel behind two Purépecha men, one carving a stone and the other carrying a carved block on his back. By 2020, the Supreme Indigenous Council of Michoacán (CSIM) began calling for the monument's removal, arguing that it was a racist representation that depicted the subjugation of Indigenous people. However, no agreement was reached with the city government.

In February 2022, multiple CSIM members toppled two of the statues, those depicting the master builder and the friar. Members of the CSIM have stated that they intend to replace the remaining part of the monument with a statue of Tangaxuan II, the last ruler of the Purépecha Empire.

== Description and meaning ==
The Monumento a los Constructores was installed as a tribute to those who built the historic center of Morelia, Michoacán. The monument is located at the starting point of the aqueduct on a vegetal slope symbolizing the Loma de Guayangareo, where Morelia was built. The city was later renamed to Valladolid and later to Morelia.

The Monumento a los Constructores is a bronze complex that symbolizes the building of an irrigation system carried out by Indigenous labor under Spanish supervision. It is a 1.5-meter (4 ft 11 in) long artwork that originally featured four statues and weighed 8 metric tons (7.9 long tons; 8.8 short tons). From front to back, the first statue depicts a Purépecha mason carrying a stone on his back, dressed in torn clothes and bare-chested. Next, a Purépecha man carves a squared stone. Behind them, shoulder to shoulder, stood the statues of a master builder holding a blueprint and friar Antonio de San Miguel, with his left arm outstretched.

According to the accompanying plaque, the mason represented the anonymous builders; the stonemason, the skilled labor of stone cutting; symbolized architects and engineers; and Fray Antonio stood for both ecclesiastical and civil authorities, as well as others involved in the city's construction. Fray Antonio, bishop of the Diocese of Michoacán, was included for commissioning the construction of the city's aqueduct during a drought in 1785. He supported the rights of Indigenous peoples and advocated for civil equality.

The inscription on the plaque (originally in Spanish and written in all caps):

To the builders of the city

The people of Morelia, with deep gratitude and pride, dedicate this monument to the memory of the builders of Guayangareo–Valladolid–Morelia. A monumental and beautiful city, woven of stone and culture, which we have inherited, and which its illustrious son, José Ma. Morelos, once called "The Garden of New Spain".
Xavier Tavera Alfaro, chronicler of the city. 21 May 1995. (Note: A los constructores de la ciudad Los habitantes de la ciudad de Morelia erigen, llenos de gratitud y orgullo, este monumento dedicado a la memoria de los constructores de Guayangareo-Valladolid-Morelia. Monumental y hermosa urbe, urdimbre de piedra y cultura, que hemos heredado, y a las que su preclaro hijo, José Ma. Morelos, la llamara "El Jardín de la Nueva España". Xavier Tavera Alfaro, cronísta de la ciudad. 21 de mayo de 1995.)

José Luis Padilla Retana, the monument's designer, explained that the mason carries the stone on his back, not as a form of punishment, but as a means of transporting the blocks and lifting them to a higher place. He also commented that Fray Antonio is not shown pointing to give an order, but rather indicating the distance toward a neutral point of the aqueduct.

== History ==
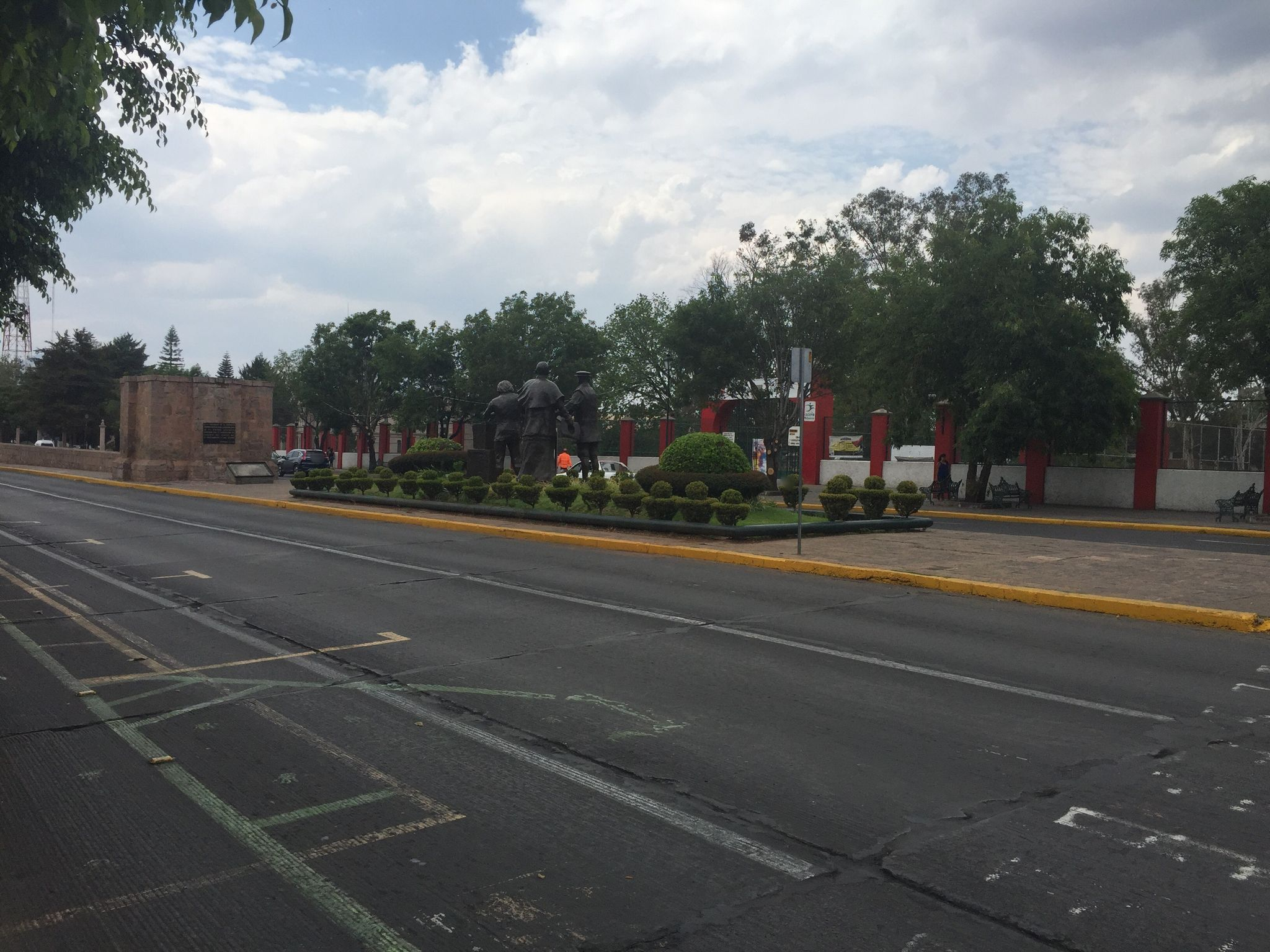
The monument along Acueducto Avenue

The monument's creation started in 1993. It was overseen by a board of trustees chaired by José Antonio Romo, a local photographic chronicler. It was installed on 18 May 1995, and the government of the state unveiled it three days later. The monument was never registered as municipal, state or national heritage.

By 2020, members of the Supreme Indigenous Council of Michoacán (Spanish: Consejo Supremo Indígena de Michoacán; CSIM), comprises 60 Indigenous communities in the state, requested the removal of the monument from the local government. They expressed their disagreement with the work, labeling it as racist, a symbol of slavery and submission, and a reminder of the Spanish conquest of the Purépecha Empire, which they described as a genocide. The CSIM also argued that the monument evoked centuries of exploitation and downplayed how the architects and priests treated Indigenous people. According to historian Eduardo Rubio Elosúa, there is no evidence of slavery involved in the construction of the aqueduct.

On 12 October 2020 (Columbus Day, also known locally as the Day of the Pluricultural Nation), a demonstration was held next to the monument, causing minimal damage. During the march, the council stated: "12 October is not the day of the Discovery of America; we were not discovered. Our territories were known, inhabited, named, and governed by the original peoples for thousands of years before the arrival of the conquerors. Our lands were invaded and plundered, not discovered". The city's cultural heritage authority responded to the removal requests by saying: "You just have to read the simple and clear plaque on the monument to feel pride in our city, the birthplace of great thinkers".

Members of the council held a referendum in the state on 1 August 2021 to determine whether the monument should be removed. Out of the ten polling stations set up, 905 people voted: 810 in favor and 87 against. Of those, 259 came from residents of Morelia: 172 in favor and 87 against. The government did not recognize the referendum as binding, as the turnout represented only 0.03% of the city's population. On 11 October 2021, members of the council threatened to topple the monument the following day. Instead, they covered the sculptures with a blue tarpaulin.

=== Toppling ===
On 14 February 2022, members of the council toppled the sculptures of Fray Antonio and the master builder, beheading the former. In response, the CSIM published a bulletin stating that "[g]iven the indolence, racism, discrimination, and lack of attention by the Morelia City Council [...] we decided collectively, in a General Assembly of Authorities, to remove on our own account the so-called sculpture 'The Builders', as it is a symbol of subordination, a representation of slavery, and an emblem of the Spanish genocide". (Note: Original text in Spanish: "Ante la indolencia, racismo, discriminación y falta de atención por parte del Ayuntamiento de Morelia (...) decidimos colectivamente en una Asamblea General de Autoridades, retirar por nuestra propia cuenta la denominada escultura 'Los Constructores', por ser un símbolo de subordinación, representación del esclavismo y un emblema del genocidio español".)

The State Attorney General's Office estimated the damage at Mex$800,000 (US$37,000), while the city placed the figure at Mex$200,000 (US$9,700). The event took place on the 492nd anniversary of the execution of Tangaxuan II, the last ruler of the Purépecha Empire, by Spanish conquistador Nuño de Guzmán. Police arrested 24 people at various locations. Of them, 21 adults agreed to repair the damage, while three minors were referred to juvenile court. The same night, demonstrators stole and set fire to three vehicles on Mexican Federal Highway 14 in protest. By 28 February, the defendants contested the agreement, arguing that their rights had been violated. They claimed they were arrested outside the area where the toppling occurred, were physically assaulted during their detentions, and were exposed by the media. They also announced their intention to take legal action against those responsible for the arrests.

Prior to the monument's toppling, Padilla Retana said: "During the time of Francisco Antonio de San Miguel, there was a great famine. He provided work for many Indigenous people who came from various places. This sculpture presented no major complication—I simply represented what I was asked to, imagining the scene based on historical elements. It depicts the mason, the stonemason, and those who oversaw the work. I don't understand why people are surprised that one figure is unclothed and another is dressed; that's how labor was back then, and even now. It's not about hurting or offending anyone, but about highlighting human sacrifice and effort". (Note: Original text in Spanish: "En la época de Francisco Antonio de San Miguel hubo una hambruna muy grande, él fue una fuente de trabajo para muchos indígenas que venían de varios lados. Esta escultura no tuvo mayor complicación, representé lo que me pidieron, la escena la imaginé así de acuerdo a los elementos históricos. Se representa al tameme, al cantero, a los que dirigen la obra. No entiendo porqué se sorprenden de que alguien esté desnudo y otro con ropa, así era el trabajo en aquellos tiempos y aún hoy. No se trata de lastimar a nadie ni de ofender a nadie, se trata de resaltar el sacrificio humano, el esfuerzo".) After the partial destruction of the monument, Padilla Retana stated that it was never intended to "humiliate anyone or denigrate our roots." He offered to reconstruct the work but noted that no molds of the original sculptures exist.

=== Future ===
Members of the CSIM have expressed their intention to substitute the remaining portion of the monument with a statue of Tangaxuan II. They have also stated that they will no longer allow monuments that they consider to be degrading to them.
