= Parque Festival México =

The Parque Festival México (English: Mexico Festival Park) is a future theme park in Zapotlanejo, Mexico. Construction started on April 3, 2009. It will encompass approximately 66 hectares (160 acres). It will be built in four phases, and when finished it will have a theme park, an aquatic park, a shopping mall, and a hotel. The theme park is projected to open in 2012, with the entire project being completed in 2024. The Wyatt Design Group is involved in planning and designing this project.
