= Mexican Federal Highway 81 =

Highway in Mexico

Federal Highway 81
- Carretera federal 81

Route information
- Maintained by Secretariat of Infrastructure, Communications and Transportation
- Length: 89.00 km (55.30 mi)

Major junctions
- North end: Fed. 85 in Llera de Canales, Tamaulipas
- Fed. 83 in Ignacio Zaragoza
- South end: Fed. 80 in González, Tamaulipas

Location
- Country: Mexico
- State: Tamaulipas

Highway system
- Mexican Federal Highways; List; Autopistas
← Fed. 80	→ Fed. 82

Federal Highway 81 (Carretera Federal 81) connects Llera de Canales, Tamaulipas, to González, Tamaulipas.
