= Dos Lunas Tequila =

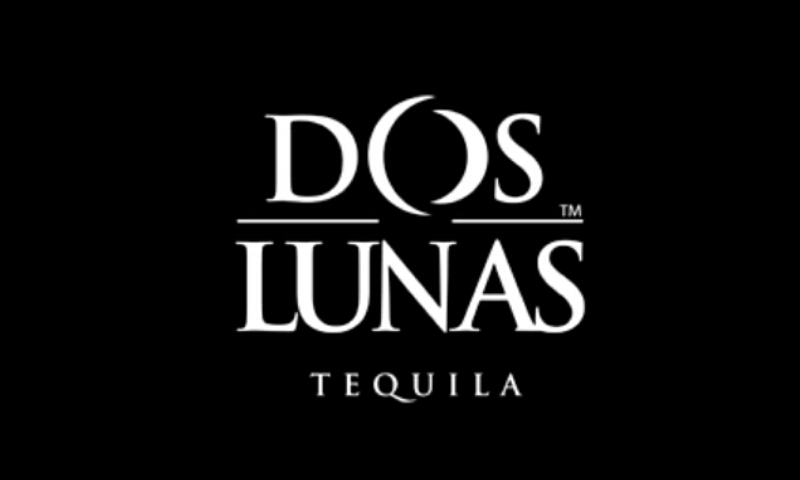
- Type: Private
- Industry: Premium Tequila
- Founded: México, 2006
- Founder: Richard C. Poe II
- Products: Anejo, Extra Anejo, Reposado, Silver
- Parent: Dos Lunas Spirits
- Website: doslunas.com

Dos Lunas is a line of 100% blue agave tequilas produced in Guadalajara, Jalisco, Mexico, by Dos Lunas Spirits, LLC, headquartered in El Paso, Texas. The brand has the first triple-distilled silver tequila, a month aged Reposado, 18 month aged Añejo and 10 year old Extra Añejo.

== History ==
On New Year's Eve 2005, Dos Lunas' founder, Richard C. Poe II, was at a bar in Telluride, Colorado. After witnessing several patrons order tequila and visibly cringe after tasting it, he had the idea to create a more premium brand of tequila that would taste good be more enjoyable to drink. In 2006, he visited Guadalajara, Mexico and secured a master distiller and began producing Dos Lunas.

== Packaging ==
The bottles used for the Silver, Reposado, and Añejo are made of frosted glass with a small, clear pane in the center which looks onto, respectively, an agave plant, tequila barrels, and an agave harvester. The bottles won two silver medals for design at the San Francisco World Spirits Competition in 2007. The Grand Reserve tequila is bottled in the first Baccarat crystal decanter ever made for tequila. The bottles are individually numbered, with 1,000 having been produced.

== Production ==
Dos Lunas Tequila is made from 100% Weber blue agave which is grown near Zapotlanejo, Jalisco, in the tequila-producing region of Mexico. All-natural fertilizer, and naturally derived yeast are utilized, while no added enzymes, synthetic anti-bacterial agents, or glycerine are used at any point during the growth, production, or bottling processes. It is also certified Kosher.

Dos Lunas Tequila is one of the few brands to avoid the use of off-site bottlers, and instead fills each bottle by hand in the same distillery where the tequila is produced. The bottles are also washed in tequila.

=== Silver ===
Dos Lunas Silver was introduced in 2006. The silver is cold-filtered, triple distilled and aged for six days in new white oak barrels.

=== Reposado ===
Dos Lunas Reposado was also introduced in 2006. The reposado is double distilled and rested for nine months in Tennessee bourbon casks, and in new American white oak barrels. At the end of the nine months, the tequilas from both casks are blended to create an always consistent smooth and mellow taste.

=== Añejo ===
Dos Lunas Añejo was introduced in 2008. Like Dos Lunas reposado, it is aged in both Tennessee whiskey casks and new American white oak casks, but is aged twice as long, being mixed and bottled after 18 months to create this distinctive sipping tequila.

=== Extra Añejo ===
Dos Lunas' Extra Añejo Grand Reserve is a special edition tequila that was made in limited quantity. 1,000 bottles were produced, out of tequila that had been aged 10 years in Spanish sherry casks.

== Awards ==
Ranked in the Top 10% of Tequilas in each category according to the Beverage Testing Institute (BTI).

=== Silver ===
- 2007: Silver Medal at the San Francisco World Spirits Competition
- 2008: Bronze Medal at the San Francisco World Spirits Competition, Bronze Medal at the Agave Spirits Challenge in Cancun, Mexico
- 2009: Silver Medal at the San Francisco World Spirits Competition, Gold Medal at the Beverage Tasting Institute’s International Review of Spirits
- 2010: Gold Medal at the San Francisco World Spirits Competition
- 2011: Silver Medal at the Hong Kong International Wine & Spirits Competition
- 2012: Gold Medal at the Beverly Hills International Spirits Award
- 2013: Silver Medal at the San Francisco World Spirits Competition, Silver Medal at the International Spirits Challenge, Platinum Medal at the World Spirits Competition

Total:

- 11 Awards
- 3 Gold
- 5 Silver
- 2 Bronze
- 1 Platinum

=== Reposado ===
- Ranked #1 in the world by both the beverage Testing Institute (BTI) and the San Francisco world Spirits Competition two years in a row (2009, 2010)
- 2006: Gold Medal at the Beverage Tasting Institute's International Review of Spirits
- 2007: Silver Medal at the San Francisco World Spirits Competition
- 2008: Bronze Medal at the Los Angeles International Wine and Spirits Competition, Gold Medal at the Beverage Tasting Institute's International Review of Spirits, Silver Medal at the Agave Spirits Challenge in Cancun, Mexico
- 2009: Silver Medal at the Los Angeles International Wine and Spirits Competition, Gold Medal at Beverage Tasting Institute's International Review of Spirits
- 2010: Double Gold Award at the San Francisco World Spirits Competition
- 2011: Silver Medal at the Hong Kong International Wine & Spirits Competition
- 2012: Gold Medal at the Beverly Hills International Spirits Award
- 2013: Double Gold Medal at the San Francisco World Spirits Competition, Bronze Medal at the International Spirits Challenge

Total:

- 12 Awards
- 2 Double Gold
- 4 Gold
- 4 Silver
- 2 Bronze

=== Añejo ===
- 2008: Silver Medal at the San Francisco World Spirits Competition, Silver Medal at the Beverage Tasting Institute's International Review of Spirits, Gold Medal at the Agave Spirits Challenge in Cancun, Mexico
- 2009: Silver medal at the Los Angeles International Wine and Spirits Competition, Gold Medal at the Beverage Tasting Institute's International Review of Spirits
- 2010: Bronze Medal at the San Francisco World Spirits Competition
- 2011: Silver Medal at the Hong Kong International Wine & Spirits Competition
- 2012: Gold Medal at the Beverly Hills International Spirits Award, Platinum Medal at the World Spirits Competition
- 2013: Silver Medal at the San Francisco World Spirits Competition

Total:

- 10 Awards
- 3 Gold
- 5 Silver
- 1 Bronze
- 1 Platinum
