= Sinaloa State Highway 1D =

State highway in Mexico

State Highway 1D
- Carretera estatal 1D
- Autopista Culiacan-Las Brisas; Autopista Estatal Benito Juarez

Route information
- Maintained by Servicios y Construcciones ORLER, S.A. de C.V.
- Length: 125.7 km (78.1 mi)
- Existed: 2001–present

Major junctions
- North end: Fed. 15 / Fed. 15D in Las Brisas
- Fed. 15D west of Culiacan
- South end: Fed. 15 in Culiacan

Location
- Country: Mexico
- State: Sinaloa

Highway system
- Mexican Federal Highways; List; Autopistas

Sinaloa State Route 1D is a toll state route that replaces Mexican Federal Highway 15D (Fed. 15D) from Culiacan to Las Brisas. It was built from 1998 to 2001 when Mexico was beginning to build toll roads as a faster alternative to the poorly-maintained and older free roads. It is the only toll road alternate for free road Fed. 15 in the northern part of the state.

The road is Maintained by Servicios y Construcciones ORLER, S.A. de C.V. The road costs 66 pesos for cars to ride. The road links the Culiacan city center with the road to Los Mochis a major city within the state and nearby ports. People traveling on Fed. 15D from Mazatlan and Guadalajara have direct access to the road from the south using Libramiento Culiacan as a road transition. People traveling from Los Mochis or Nogales can access the road by following signs for Culican Cuota.
