= Mexican Federal Highway 17 =

Highway in Mexico

Federal Highway 17
- Carretera federal 17

Route information
- Maintained by Secretariat of Communications and Transportation

Major junctions
- North end: US 191 at Mexico–U.S.border in Agua Prieta, Sonora
- South end: Fed. 14 in Moctezuma

Location
- Country: Mexico
- State: Sonora

Highway system
- Mexican Federal Highways; List; Autopistas; State Highways in Sonora
| ← Fed. 16 | → Fed. 18 |

Federal Highway 17 (Spanish: Carretera Federal 17, Fed. 17 ) is a free part of the federal highways corridors (Spanish: los corredores carreteros federales) of Mexico. The route runs from the Mexico – United States border at Agua Prieta, Sonora south to Moctezuma. The northern terminus of Fed. 17 transitions north into the United States at Douglas, Arizona as U.S. Route 191. The total length of the highway is about 169 km (105 mi).
