= Mexican Federal Highway 84 =

Highway in Mexico

Federal Highway 84
- Carretera federal 84
- Carretera Manuel Doblado-La Piedad

Route information
- Maintained by Secretariat of Infrastructure, Communications and Transportation
- Length: 100.00 km (62.14 mi)

Major junctions
- East end: Fed. 41 near Zapote de Adjuntas, Guanajuato
- Fed. 37
- West end: Fed. 80 in San José de Bazarte, Jalisco

Location
- Country: Mexico

Highway system
- Mexican Federal Highways; List; Autopistas
← Fed. 83	→ Fed. 85

Federal Highway 84 (Carretera Federal 84) connects Zapote de Adjuntas, Guanajuato to San José de Bazarte, Jalisco. It provides indirect service to La Piedad, Michoacán.
