= Mexican Federal Highway 35 =

Highway in Mexico

Federal Highway 35
- Carretera federal 35

Route information
- Maintained by Secretariat of Infrastructure, Communications and Transportation
- Length: 172 km (107 mi)

Jalisco
- Length: 79 km (49 mi)
- East end: Fed. 44 in Ixtlahuacán de los Membrillos
- Major intersections: Fed. GUA 10D in Ixtlahuacán de los Membrillos
- West end: Fed. 15D / Fed. 71 / Fed. 110 in La Barca, Jalisco

Nuevo León
- Length: 93 km (58 mi)
- North end: Fed. 40 in China, Nuevo León
- South end: Fed. 85 in Montemorelos, Nuevo León

Location
- Country: Mexico

Highway system
- Mexican Federal Highways; List; Autopistas
← Fed. 34	→ Fed. 36

Federal Highway 35 (Spanish: Carretera Federal 35, Fed. 35) is a federal highway in Mexico consisting of two separate segments that are not connected to each other.

== Jalisco segment ==
Fed. 35 in Jalisco runs from Santa Rosa, an agency of the municipality of Ixtlahuacán de los Membrillos, to La Barca, Jalisco. The segment is 79 km (49.1 mi) long. It passes through Atequiza, Atotonilquillo, Poncitlán, Ocotlán, and Jamay, following the northern side of the Lake Chapala lowlands and crossing the Río Lerma plain.

Traffic counts published by the Secretaría de Infraestructura, Comunicaciones y Transportes in 2025 recorded an average of about 11,100 vehicles per day near Santa Rosa, 28,700 near Ocotlán and 14,000 near La Barca. The Ocotlán count was the highest on the Jalisco segment.

The highway was originally a two-lane road and had a history of serious accidents, particularly between Santa Rosa and Poncitlán. Widening to four lanes began in February 2009 on the section beyond Atequiza and Atotonilquillo. In September 2009, work on a five-kilometre section was about half complete. Carlos Romero Bertrand, director of the Jalisco SCT centre, said that 90 million pesos had been invested in the work that year.

By 2013, the widening had reached Ocotlán. About 350 million pesos was spent on the work that year, and two grade-separated crossings were added. The Santa Rosa–Ocotlán section, about 48 km long, was inaugurated as a four-lane road with three interchanges, three vehicular overpasses and pedestrian crossings. Then-transport secretary Gerardo Ruiz Esparza said the widening was expected to reduce the risk of accidents by about 70 percent.

Accidents and maintenance problems have continued to be reported on the route. Local news outlets reported a multi-vehicle collision at kilometer 38 in Poncitlán in December 2023 that injured eight people, as well as a fatal crash on the La Barca–Ocotlán section in October 2025. In 2024, the federal finance ministry withheld road-maintenance funds that had been budgeted for the year. Federal deputy Omar Borboa Becerra told the Comisión Permanente that the reduction led to the cancellation of federal road-conservation tenders nationwide. Jalisco's state government has also reported a decline in federal conservation spending on the state's roads between 2019 and 2023. In January 2025, El Informador reported that about 36 percent of Jalisco's federal roads were in good condition at that time.

Fed. 35 connects the Guadalajara metropolitan area, including the Santa Rosa industrial corridor in Ixtlahuacán de los Membrillos, with the Ciénega region around Lake Chapala. It also serves Ocotlán's furniture industry and provides an alternative to the Guadalajara–La Barca toll highway, Fed. 15D.

== Nuevo León segment ==
Fed. 35 in Nuevo León runs for 93 km (57.8 mi) between Montemorelos and China, Nuevo León, passing through General Terán. The highway follows the Pilón river valley and ends at China near the El Cuchillo reservoir on the Río San Juan.

Traffic is heaviest near Montemorelos and decreases toward China. The 2025 SICT traffic counts recorded about 10,600 vehicles per day near Montemorelos, 2,500 near General Terán and 2,000 near China.

The Montemorelos–General Terán section is locally associated with some of the earliest road-paving work in the region. Local histories of Montemorelos and General Terán state that the road was paved in the 1920s to provide access to property owned by President Plutarco Elías Calles near General Terán. According to these accounts, Calles travelled by train to Montemorelos and then continued by automobile, with paving beginning around 1922 and extending in 1926. This account is not corroborated by the national histories of Mexico's paved-road network, which identify the México–Puebla road, inaugurated in 1926, and the Laredo–Monterrey road, inaugurated in 1928, as early milestones in the country's highway development.

The Montemorelos–General Terán–China route crosses Nuevo León's main citrus-growing region. Montemorelos, General Terán and Cadereyta Jiménez together account for about 80 percent of the state's citrus harvest, producing roughly 355,000 tonnes of oranges, mandarins and grapefruit each year, according to state agricultural data. General Terán also produces maize, beans, wheat and sorghum and has cattle ranching. It received Pueblo Mágico status in 2023.

China is located near the Cuchillo-Solidaridad reservoir on the Río San Juan. The reservoir was inaugurated in October 1994 and supplies water to the Monterrey metropolitan area through an aqueduct roughly 110 km long.

The Nuevo León government has carried out rehabilitation work on the nearby China–Méndez road and is developing the Carretera Interserrana, a separate highway intended to connect the southern and citrus-growing regions of the state with the Sierra Madre Oriental. The planned highway is 81.459 km long and is being developed as a four-lane, high-standard road.
