= Mexican Federal Highway 37 =

Highway in Mexico

Federal Highway 37
- Carretera federal 37

Route information
- Maintained by Secretariat of Infrastructure, Communications and Transportation
- Length: 530.3 km (329.5 mi)

North segment
- Length: 117 km (73 mi)
- North end: Fed. 57 in Villa de Zaragoza, San Luis Potosí
- South end: Fed. 51 in San Felipe

South segment
- Length: 413.3 km (256.8 mi)
- North end: Manuel Doblado
- Major intersections: Fed. 90 east of La Piedad; Fed. 200 in La Mira, Michoacán
- South end: Playa Azul

Location
- Country: Mexico

Highway system
- Mexican Federal Highways; List; Autopistas
← Fed. 36	→ Fed. 39

Federal Highway 37 (Spanish: Carretera Federal 37, Fed. 37) is a toll-free part of the federal highways corridors (Spanish: los corredores carreteros federales) of Mexico. The highway runs from Villa de Zaragoza, San Luis Potosí, at its northern point to Playa Azul, Michoacán, located near the Pacific Ocean, at its southern point, near the port city of Lázaro Cárdenas, Michoacán. It crosses Fed. 14 at Uruapan, Michoacán, and Federal Highway 200 at La Mira, Michoacan.

Fed. 37 runs in two separate improved segments: the first segment runs from Villa de Zaragoza to San Felipe, Guanajuato. The second segment runs from Manuel Doblado, Guanajuato, to Playa Azul at Fed. 200. The two segments are connected via GTO 77 and Fed. 84-JAL 80. The highway is partly paralleled by Federal Highway 37D.
