= Mexican Federal Highway 200D =

Toll highway in Mexico

Federal Highway 200D
- Carretera federal 200D

Route information
- Maintained by Secretariat of Communications and Transportation

Location
- Country: Mexico

Highway system
- Mexican Federal Highways; List; Autopistas

Federal Highway 200D is the toll highways paralleling Fed. 200, and has two separate improved segments of designated roadway. Fed200D in Colima funnels traffic from Manzanillo toward Fed. 110 to the city of Colima; the segment in Guerrero serves as a bypass of Tecpan.

A third segment, from Arriaga to Ocozocuautla in Chiapas, is officially Fed. 200D but the signage identifies it as Fed. 190D.

A fourth Segment will go from Tepic to Compostela. Phase 1 is to build a new toll road from Compostela to near the town of Mazatan, there, It will meet with Mexican Federal Highway 70D, whose purpose is to Facilitate Access to Puerto Vallarta from Guadalajara. Phase 2 Requires Extending the road North to Tepic Where it Meets Mexican Federal Highway 15D to Facilitate Access to Puerto Vallarta from Tepic.

== Manzanillo-Colima ==
Autopista Manzanillo-Colima
- Location: Fed. 200 in Manzanillo, Colima to Fed. 200 between Armería and Tecomán, Colima
- Length: 46 km (29 mi)

Fed200D in Colima expedites traffic from near the southern terminus of Fed. 110 into Manzanillo, terminating at Armería, Colima. This 46-kilometre (29 mi) highway is operated by Promotora y Operadora de Infraestructura, S.A.B. de C.V. (PINFRA).

The highway begins at an interchange with Fed200 and the non-toll Libramiento de Manzanillo and proceeds south to the Pacific coast, where it parallels a railroad line. The only toll plaza is located near Cuyutlán. The road then turns inland and has one interchange to serve Armería, then ends east of that town where travelers can continue to Colima City on Fed. 110.

== Autopista Tepic-Compostela & Ramal a Compostela ==
Autopista Tepic-Compostela
- Location: Fed. 15D near San Cayetano, Nayarit to Fed. 68D in Compostela, Nayarit
- Length: 28 km (17 mi)

Ramal a Compostela
- Location: Fed. 68D in Compostela, Nayarit to Fed. 70D near Mazatan, Nayarit
- Length: 13 km (8.1 mi)

Autopista Tepic-Compostela is the first segment, it is a 28 kilometres (17 mi) road that is under Construction from its interchange on Autopista Guadalajara-Tepic & Libramiento de Tepic in San Cayetano to Mexican Federal Highway 68D in Compostela, it does not have a scheduled opening date.

Ramal a Compostela is the second segment, it is a 13 kilometres (8.1 mi) road from Mexican Federal Highway 68D in Compostela to it Terminus on Autopista Jala-Compostela near Mazatan, it is open and Fully operational since February 13, 2017 and is Maintained by OCACSA

== Libramiento de Tecpan ==
Libramiento de Tecpan
- Location: Fed. 200 at Tecpan, Guerrero to Fed. 200 at Tecpan, Guerrero
- Length: 4.4 km (2.7 mi)

OCACSA maintains Fed. 200D's other signaged segment, the Libramiento de Tecpan, which serves as a bypass of Tecpan de Galeana, Guerrero. While Federal Highway 180 swings up to Tecpan, the bypass allows travelers between Acapulco and Zihuatanejo to save time by bypassing the road altogether. The toll per automobile is 30 pesos to travel the full course of the road.
