= Mexican Federal Highway 90 =

Highway in Mexico

Federal Highway 90
- Carretera federal 90

Route information
- Maintained by Secretariat of Infrastructure, Communications and Transportation
- Length: 335.7 km (208.6 mi)

East segment
- Length: 217.6 km (135.2 mi)
- East end: Fed. 45D in Irapuato, Guanajuato
- West end: Fed. 80D / Fed. 90D / Fed. GUA 10D near Zapotlanejo, Jalisco

West segment
- Length: 118.1 km (73.4 mi)
- East end: Fed. 70 in Ameca, Jalisco
- West end: Fed. 200 in Puerto Vallarta, Jalisco

Location
- Country: Mexico

Highway system
- Mexican Federal Highways; List; Autopistas
← Fed. 87	→ Fed. 93

Federal Highway 90 (Carretera Federal 90) connects Irapuato, Guanajuato to Zapotlanejo, Jalisco near Guadalajara. Federal Highway 90 has two main segments.

The first segment runs westward from Zapotlanejo, Jalisco eastward to Irapuato, Guanajuato and connects to Guadalajara via Mexican Federal Highway 80. The total length of the highway segment is 217.6 km (135.2 mi). The second segment runs westward from Mascota, Jalisco eastward to Ameca, Jalisco. The total length of the highway segment is 118.1 km (73.4 mi). Federal Highway 90 connects to Puerto Vallarta via Jalisco State Highway 70.

The highway is under the management of the Secretariat of Communications and Transportation of Mexico and custody is under the responsibility of the National Guard. The road runs through the center of Mexico from west to east.

The road connects the following cities from west to east: Zapotlanejo, Ocotlán, Degollado, La Piedad, Pénjamo, Abasolo, and Irapuato.
