= Mexican Federal Highway 14 =

Highway in Mexico

Federal Highway 14
- Carretera federal 14

Route information
- Maintained by Secretariat of Infrastructure, Communications and Transportation

Sonora
- East end: Fed. 17 near Moctezuma
- West end: Fed. 15D near Hermosillo

Michoacán
- East end: Fed. 15D in Morelia
- West end: Fed. 37 in Uruapan

Location
- Country: Mexico

Highway system
- Mexican Federal Highways; List; Autopistas
← Fed. 12	→ Fed. 14D

Federal Highway 14 (Spanish: Carretera Federal 14, Fed. 14) is a toll-free part of the federal highways corridors (Spanish: los corredores carreteros federales) of Mexico.

Fed. 14 in Sonora runs from Fed. 15 north of Hermosillo east to Huásabas. Fed. 17 intersects with Fed. 14 in Moctezuma, Sonora. The total length of the highway is 212.5 km (132.04 mi).

Fed. 14 in Michoacán runs from Fed. 37 in Uruapan to Morelia. The highway passes through the towns of San Andrés Coru, Santiago Tingambato, Huiramangaro and Pátzcuaro. The total length of the highway is 113.3 km (70.4 mi).
