= Mexican Federal Highway 54D =

Toll highway in Mexico

Federal Highway 54D
- Carretera federal 54D
- Autopista Guadalajara-Colima

Route information
- Maintained by Operadora de Autopistas Sayula
- Length: 148 km (92 mi)
- Existed: January 1989–present

Major junctions
- South end: Fed. 54 / Fed. 110 in Colima, Colima
- North end: Fed. 15 / Fed. 54 / Fed. 80 near Acatlán de Juárez, Jalisco

Location
- Country: Mexico

Highway system
- Mexican Federal Highways; List; Autopistas

Federal Highway 54D (Autopista Guadalajara-Colima) is a toll highway connecting Colima, Colima to Acatlán de Juárez, Jalisco. The road is operated by Operadora de Autopistas Sayula, which charges cars 272 pesos to travel Highway 54D.

== Route description ==
Highway 54D begins at an interchange with Highways 80 and 15 in Acatlán de Juárez, some 35 kilometres (22 mi) southwest of Guadalajara. The road proceeds south and southwest through Zacoalco de Torres, Sayula, Ciudad Guzmán and Atenquique in Jalisco, as well as Cuauhtémoc in Colima, before ending northeast of Colima city. In total, it has seven interchanges.
