= Mexican Federal Highway 68D =

Toll highway in Mexico

Federal Highway 68D
- Carretera federal 68D
- Autopista Chapalilla-Compostela

Route information
- Maintained by Caminos y Puentes Federales
- Length: 38 km (24 mi)

Major junctions
- West end: Fed. 200 in Compostela, Nayarit
- Fed. 200D in Compostela, Nayarit; Fed. 15 in Chapalilla, Nayarit
- East end: Fed. 15D near Chapalilla, Nayarit

Location
- Country: Mexico
- State: Nayarit

Highway system
- Mexican Federal Highways; List; Autopistas

Federal Highway 68D is a toll highway in the Mexican state of Nayarit. It connects the cities of Compostela and Chapalilla. The road is operated by Caminos y Puentes Federales, which charges cars 38 pesos to travel Highway 68D.
