= Mexican Federal Highway 37D =

Toll highway in Mexico

Federal Highway 37D
- Carretera federal 37D
- Autopista Uruapan-Lázaro Cárdenas; Autopista Siglo XXI

Route information
- Maintained by Autopistas Michoacán
- Length: 218.5 km (135.8 mi)

Major junctions
- North end: Fed. 14D at Uruapan, Michoacán
- Fed. 120 at Nueva Italia, Michoacán; Fed. 200 near Joluta, Guerrero; Fed. 200 near Lázaro Cárdenas, Michoacán
- South end: Av. Lázaro Cárdenas in Lázaro Cárdenas, Michoacán

Location
- Country: Mexico
- State: Michoacán

Highway system
- Mexican Federal Highways; List; Autopistas

Federal Highway 37D is a Mexican toll highway in Michoacán and Guerrero. It connects Highway 14D at Uruapan to Lázaro Cárdenas. The road is operated by Autopistas Michoacán, which charges a toll of 307 pesos per car to travel the full length of Highway 37D.

Highway 14D from Pátzcuaro southwest, along with the entirety of Highway 37D, are together referred to as the Autopista Siglo XXI.
