= Mexican Federal Highway 54 =

Highway in Mexico

Federal Highway 54
- Carretera federal 54

Route information
- Maintained by Secretariat of Infrastructure, Communications and Transportation
- Length: 984.64 km (611.83 mi)

Major junctions
- East end: Fed. 2 in Ciudad Mier, Tamaulipas
- Fed. 40 in Monterrey Fed. 40 / Fed. 57 in Saltillo; Fed. 57 in Saltillo; Fed. 62 in San Tiburcio, Zacatecas; Fed. 45 in Morelos; Fed. 45 west of Zacatecas; Fed. 23 in Malpaso; Fed. 70 in Jalpa; Fed. 15 / Fed. 80 in Guadalajara; Fed. 15 / Fed. 54D / Fed. 80 in Acatlán de Juárez; Fed. 54D in Acatlán de Juárez; Fed. 54D in Ciudad Guzmán; Fed. 54D near Tuxpan (Atenquíque) Fed. 54D near El Trapiche, Colima
- West end: Fed. 110 in Colima City

Location
- Country: Mexico

Highway system
- Mexican Federal Highways; List; Autopistas
← Fed. 53	→ Fed. 55

Federal Highway 54 (Carretera Federal 54) Fed. 54 is a toll-free (libre) part of the federal highways corridors (los corredores carreteros federales) and connects Ciudad Mier, Tamaulipas, to Colima City.

The highway joins Fed. 15 and Fed. 80 in the southwest part of Guadalajara. For 148 km (92 mi), the Fed. 54 designation is substituted by Fed. 54D from Acatlán de Juárez, Jalisco to Ciudad Guzmán, a toll road.

Across the southern Mexican Plateau, Fed. 54 connects Zacatecas in the southwest to Monterrey in the northeast at Fed. 57.
