= Acatlán de Juárez =

- Municipality and town
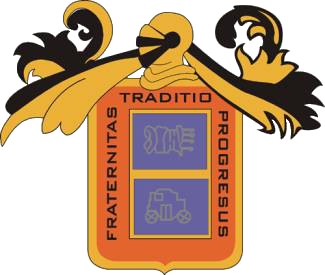
- Coat of arms

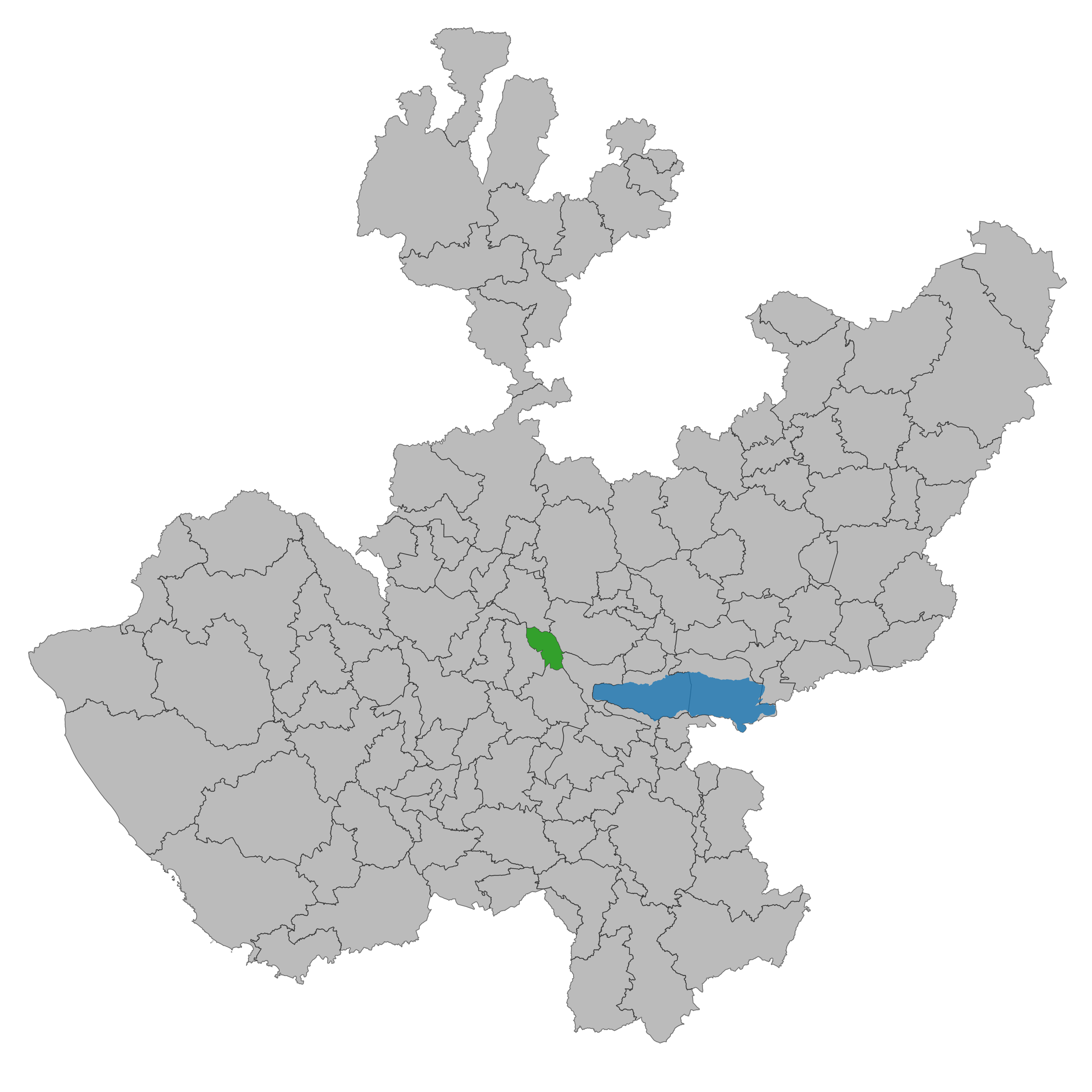
- Location of the municipality in Jalisco

- Location in Mexico
- Coordinates: 20°14′N 103°32′W
- Country: Mexico
- State: Jalisco

Government
  - Municipal president: Jaime Enrique Velasco; MC

Area
  - Total: 154 km^{2} (59 sq mi)
  - Town: 4.26 km^{2} (1.64 sq mi)
- Elevation: 1,393 m (4,570 ft)

Population (2020 census)
  - Total: 25,250
  - Density: 164/km^{2} (425/sq mi)
  - Town: 11,110
  - Town density: 2,610/km^{2} (6,750/sq mi)

Acatlán de Juárez is a town and municipality, in Jalisco in central-western Mexico. The municipality covers an area of 154 km^{2}.

As of 2005, the municipality had a total population of 22,540.

== History ==
The first settlers in the region were members of a tribe that was established in Cocula, They were defeated by the Purepecha in 1509.

In the year of 1550 the area for the first time attained the first level of a municipality, under the power of the viceroy of the New Spain, Antonio de Mendoza. During his rule he encountered discontent with people in Zacoalco de Torres, Ahualulco and Ameca. In the first half of the 17th century the Augustinians built a temple dedicated to Santa Ana, known today as the "Parroquia de Santa Ana".

In 1825 the area fell under the canton of Sayula. In 1858, Benito Juárez, in his journey through these lands, stayed at the inn in the town of Acatlán de Juárez, owned by Miguel Gomez. During his short stay, he was killed at the hands of the conservatives, and died saving the pastor of the place, Meliton Gutierrez Vargas. On March 22, 1906, by decree 1158, the name of the earlier village changed its name from Santa Ana Acatlan to Acaltán de Juarez, and acquired the title of a town.

== Geography ==
Acatlán de Juárez is located in the centre of Jalisco state between the coordinates 20° 14'30" north latitude and 103° 32'30" west longitude at an altitude of 1,393 metres above sea level.

The municipality is bordered on the north by the municipalities of Tala and Tlajomulco de Zuñiga, to the east by the municipalities of Tlajomulco de Zuñiga, Jocotepec and Zacoalco de Torres to the south with the municipalities of Zacoalco de Torres and Villa Corona, and to the west by the municipalities of Villa Corona and Tala.

Approximately 57% of the land area is flat, especially in the middle east, west and south of the municipality with its characteristic valleys. The primary agricultural areas at some 39% are located to the north and east, with altitudes of 1,400 and 1,500 m. There are some hilly areas accounting for just 4% of the land area which lies to the south-east and north-west at altitudes that reach the 2.200 m.

The municipality belongs to the hydrological basin known as Lerma-Chapala-Santiago. Its water resources are provided by the Acatlán River and the springs El Cajón del Muerto and Charco Verde. In addition, several small streams flow in the rainy season, the Hurtado, Presa Chica and Bordo de San Gerardo.

The climate is dry with a dry winter and spring, semi-warm in the winter season. The average annual temperature is 20.5 °C, with an average annual rainfall of 714.7 mm and can reach up to 1,100, with the heaviest rainfall in July and August. Prevailing winds flow in the easterly direction.

== Economy ==
Agriculture is the primary activity in the municipality, with crops such as sugarcane, maize, beans, peanuts, sunflower and tomato. Livestock is also a main economic activity with the rearing of cattle, swine, sheep, goats, horses, rabbits and hives. Sugar and alcohol production are of note. The town has a wide variety of commercial establishments and provides services to tourists.

== Government ==
The form of government is democratic under the state and Federal elections, which are held every three years. At the municipal level, the mayor and her/his council are elected. The current municipal president is Jaime Enrique Velasco, from the Citizens' Movement party. He was elected in the election of 6 June 2021.

The municipality has 27 villages, the most important ones are: Acatlán de Juárez (town), Bellavista, El Plan, San José de los Pozos, San Pedro Valencia, and Villa de los Niños.

=== Municipal presidents ===
Municipal president	Term	Political party	Notes
Miguel Díaz C.	1878		
Manuel López Portillo	1879		
Basilio Rueda	1880		
Pedro Zaragoza	1881		
Manuel López Portillo	1882		
Joaquín Baeza	1883		
Silvestre Ruvalcaba	1897		
J. M. Elizondo	1897		
Basilio Rueda	1898		
Francisco Baeza	1898		
Basilio Rueda	1898		
Tranquilino Elizondo	1899		
Basilio Rueda	1899		
Tranquilino Elizondo	1899		
Joaquín Baeza	1900		
Antonio Ruvalcaba	1901		
Andrés T. Bobadilla	1902		
Francisco Baeza	1903		
Joaquín Baeza	1903		
Miguel Corona	1904		
Joaquín Baeza	1904		Substitute
Ignacio Guzmán	1904		Substitute
Joaquín Baeza	1904		Substitute
Andrés Bobadilla	1904		Substitute
Heladio Rueda	1906		By operation of the law
Heladio Rueda	1907		
Ignacio Guzmán	1907		
Heladio Rueda	1907		
Leopoldo López Portillo	1907		
Heladio Rueda	1907		
Joaquín Baeza	1908		
Leopoldo López Portillo	1908		
Joaquín Baeza	1908		
Leopoldo López Portillo	1909		
Heladio Rueda	1910		
Antonio Ruvalcaba	1910		Substitute
Antonio Ruvalcaba	1910		
Leopoldo López Portillo	1911		
Antonio V. Alvarado	1911		
Adalberto Olvera	1912		
Manuel Vázquez	1912		
Adalberto Olvera	1912		
Manuel Vázquez	1912		By operation of the law
Jesús V. García	1912		By operation of the law
Adalberto Olvera	1912		
Serapio Bobadilla	1913		
José Ma. Villagrana	1914		
Enrique Martínez	1914		
Juan Zúñiga	1914		
Primitivo Zepeda	1915		Acting municipal president
Juan Zúñiga	1915		
Francisco Corona	1915		
Francisco Corona	1916		
Gabriel Guerrero	1916		
Basilio Jiménez	1916		
Felipe Siordia	1916		
Ignacio García	1916		
Felipe Siordia	1917		
Ignacio Siordia	1918		
Marcos Gutiérrez	1918		
Félix Ramírez	1919		
Marcos Gutiérrez	1919		
Matías García	1919		By operation of the law
Marcos Gutiérrez	1919		
Servando Rueda	1920		
Saturnino Corral	1920		
J. Félix Ramírez	1920		Acting municipal president
José Aguilar	1921		
Edmundo Bobadilla	1921		
Aurelio López	1921		Acting municipal president
Edmundo Bobadilla	1921		
Andrés T. Bobadilla	1922		
Saturnino Coral	1922		
Apolonio Trujillo H.	1922		
Saturnino Coral	1922		
Servando Rizo	1923		
Servando Rueda	1923		
Apolonio Trujillo	1923		
Apolonio Trujillo	1924		
Rodrigo Pérez	1924		
Concepción Cortés	1924		
Ponciano Salas	1924		
Jaime Castillo	1924		
Roberto Cárdenas	1924		
Roberto Cárdenas	1925		
Francisco R. Flores	1925		
Francisco R. Flores	1926		
Manuel Ruvalcaba	1926		
Saturnino Coral	1926		
Francisco López García	1926		
J. Félix Ramírez	1927		
Ignacio Baeza	1927		
Secundino Torres	1927		
Francisco López García	1928		
Benjamín Alamillo	1928		
Andrés Larios	1928		By operation of the law
Francisco López García	1928		
Samuel R. Trujillo	1929		
Francisco López García	1930	PNR	
Saturnino Coral	1931	PNR	
Lamberto Castellanos	1932	PNR	
Narciso Gutiérrez	1933–1934	PNR	
Aureliano Z. Alvarado	1935	PNR	
Pedro Villegas	1936	PNR	
Gonzalo Castillo	1937	PNR	
Margarito Ríos	1938	PRM	
Víctor Limón	1939	PRM	
Narciso Gutiérrez	1940	PRM	
Clemente Hermosillo	1941–1942	PRM	
José Grajeda Gómez	1943–1944	PRM	
Fidel García Gómez	1945–1946	PRM	
Silvestre Ruvalcaba Rizo	1947–1948	PRI	
N/A	1949–1950		
N/A	1951–1952		
José Hernández Velasco	01-01-1953–31-12-1955	PRI	
Silvestre Ruvalcaba Rizo	01-01-1956–31-12-1958	PRI	
J. Natividad Barrera García	01-01-1959–31-12-1961	PRI	
J. Jesús Ramírez Hernández	01-01-1962–31-12-1964	PRI	
Ignacio Meléndez Maldonado	01-01-1965–31-12-1967	PRI	
Isidoro Díaz Mejía	01-01-1968–31-12-1970	PRI	
Alberto Cuevas Zúñiga	01-01-1971–31-12-1973	PRI	
Apolonio Fúnez Cabrera	01-01-1974–31-12-1976	PRI	
Florencio Domínguez Íñiguez	01-01-1977–31-12-1979	PRI	
Juan Ruiz Guerrero	1980–1982	PRI	
Petronilo Ibarra	1982	PRI	Acting municipal president
J. Natividad Barrera García	1983	PRI	
Juan García Lizaola	1983–1985	PRI	Acting municipal president
Ma. Guadalupe de León López	1986–1988	PRI	
Rito Moreno Hernández	01-01-1989–1992	PRI	
José Ortiz Borrayo	1992–1995	PRI	
Felipe de Jesús López García	1995–1997	PRI	
Miguel Ángel Carrasco	01-01-1998–31-12-2000	PVEM	
Martín Dávalos Gómez	01-01-2001–2003	PRI	
Remigio García Villegas	01-01-2004–31-12-2006	PRI	
Luis Carrillo Bueno	01-01-2007–31-12-2009	PRD; PT	
Édgar Santiago Aviña Mejía	01-01-2010–30-09-2012	PAN	
Emeterio Corona Vázquez	01-10-2012–30-09-2015	PRI; PVEM	Coalition "Compromise for Jalisco"
Gerardo Uvaldo Ochoa Alvarado	01-10-2015–30-09-2018	MC	
Gerardo Uvaldo Ochoa Alvarado	01-10-2018–30-09-2021	MC	Was reelected on 01-07-2018
Jaime Enrique Velasco López	01-10-2021–	MC	

== Culture ==
Our Lady of Guadalupe	Juan Diego

Much of the architecture in the municipality is stone work dating back to the 1850s. The town contains the "Benito Juárez" arts and crafts museum. A religious festival is celebrated on July 26 n honor of St. Anne, the patron saint of the city. It is customary on December 11 each year to also light bonfires at night along the streets, to commemorate the vision of Our Lady of Guadalupe to Juan Diego.

Local cuisine includes the Birria goat, Carnitas beef, pork and beans and sweets known as Encalada flour fritters and ponteduro. Guarapo, a fruit cane juice and fruit punch are common beverages.

== Notable landmarks ==
Architecture

- Parroquia de Santa Ana
- Museo de Artes y Oficios
- Chorros de Santa Ana
- Mesón de la Providencia
- Museo Benito Juárez
- Panteón Municipal

Parks and reserves

- Cerro de la Coronilla
- Mirador de Santa Cruz
- Cerro de la Lima
- Paseo del Río
- Presa del Hurtado

== Notable people ==
- Isidoro Díaz – international footballer
