= El Arenal, Jalisco =

El Arenal
- Municipality and town
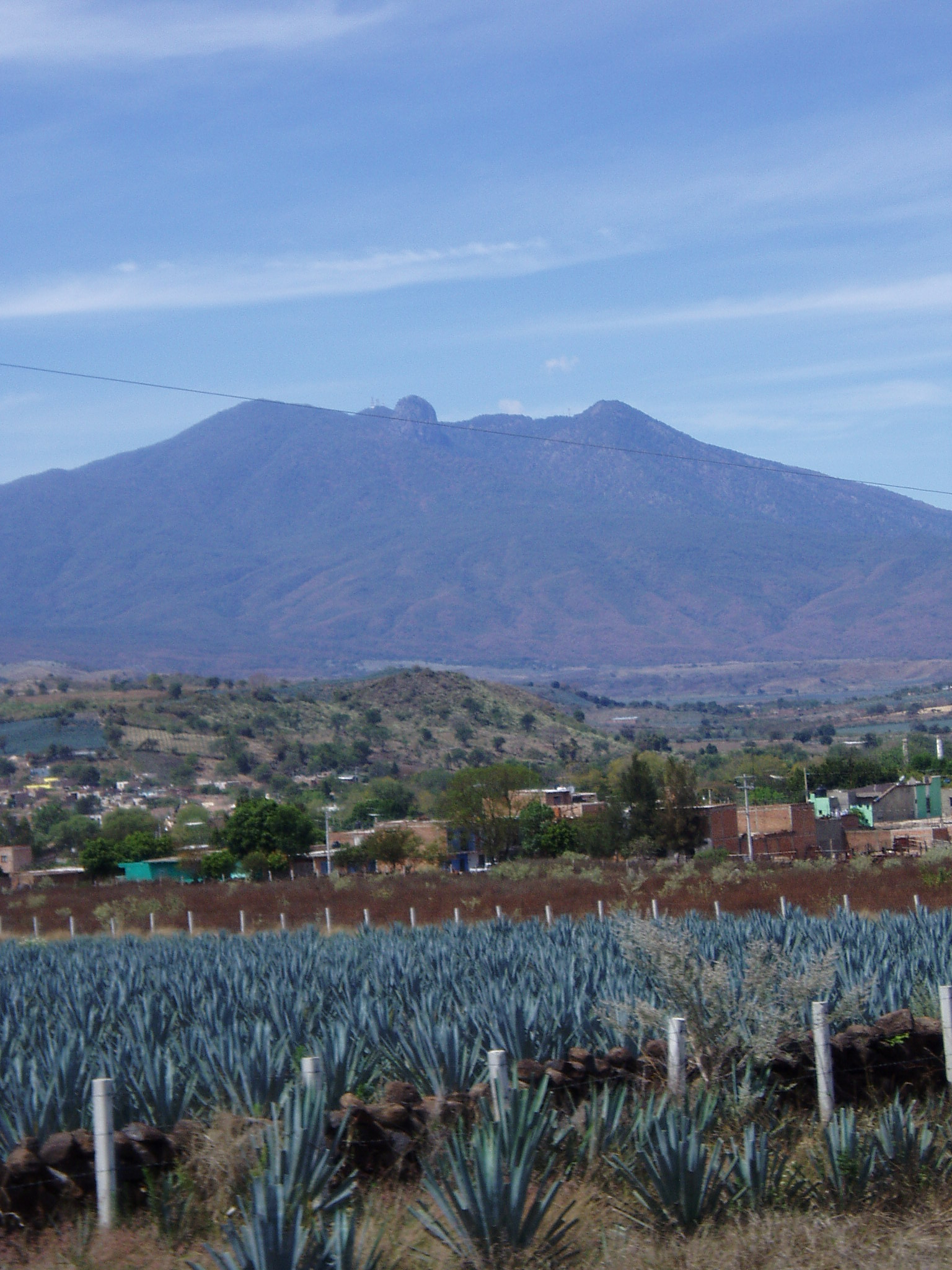

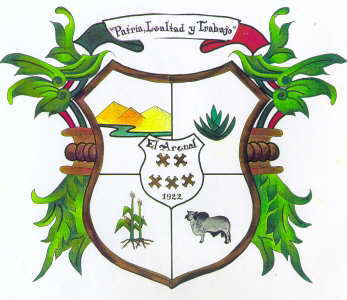
- Coat of arms

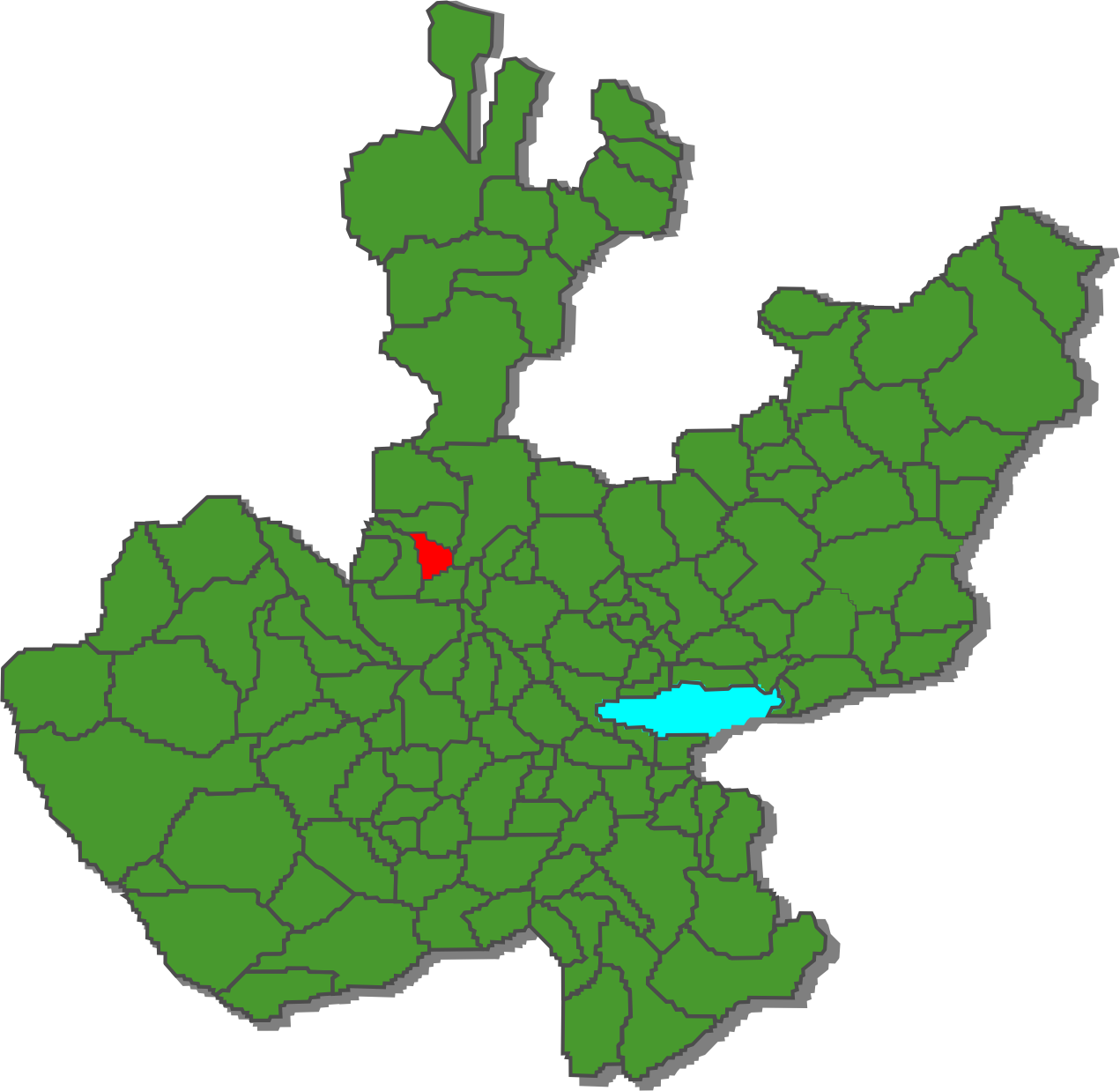
- Location of the municipality in Jalisco

- Location in Mexico
- Coordinates: 20°42′N 103°37′W
- Country: Mexico
- State: Jalisco

Area
  - Total: 111.8 km^{2} (43.2 sq mi)
  - Town: 3.44 km^{2} (1.33 sq mi)

Population (2020 census)
  - Total: 21,115
  - Density: 188.9/km^{2} (489.2/sq mi)
  - Town: 12,438
  - Town density: 3,620/km^{2} (9,360/sq mi)
- Postal code: 45350

El Arenal is a town and municipality in the state of Jalisco in central-western Mexico. El Arenal is known as the gateway to the so-called "blue agave" region in the Jaliscan Highlands (Los Altos de Jalisco). The municipality has an area of approximately 111.8 square kilometres (43.2 mi^{2}).

As of 2005, the municipality had a total population of 13,574.

== The tequila factories ==
The municipality includes La Providencia (claimed to be the first to export tequila to Europe), Cascahuín, Herencia de Agaves, Don Rigo and Don Valente factories.

== Toponymy ==
Its name derives from the terrestrial conditions of the first settlement, since there was a lot of sand in the valley.

== Coat of arms ==
The municipal coat of arms is divided into four quarters. In the upper part there are some mounds of sand, an abundant material at the time of the first settlement, which gave its name to the municipality, and an agave plant, the cultivation of which has become economically important in the region. In the lower sections are the figures of a milpa (cultivated field ) and a cow, representing local agriculture, the main economic activity. In the upper central part, crowning the shield, the legend appears: "Homeland, Loyalty and Work", values ascribed to the natives of this municipality.

The City Council ran a contest for the best design of a coat of arms in commemoration of the 69th anniversary of the constitution of the municipality, with the winning design being submitted by Ana Elda Rosas Jiménez. The official coat of arms of the municipality was approved in the Cabildo session of May 30, 1992.

== History ==
Its primitive settlers were Nahoa s. Shortly before the arrival of the conquerors, the Purépecha people found the region in its failed attempt to seize the salt flats on the beaches. Archeological studies indicated that the area may have been the center of the civilization that built the Guachimontones pyramids. The founders of modern El Arenal were: Familias Ruiz, Castañeda, Ocampo, Ibarra, Rosales, and Sanchez, Donato Ruiz, Miguel Rosales Armas, Enrique Rosales Sánchez and his brother Emiliano; Manuel Ruiz and Andrés Ibarra. Its name derives from the ground conditions of the first settlement, since there was a lot of sand in the valley. Until 1922, El Arenal was a delegation of the municipality of Amatitán. By decree number 2270, published on June 5, 1923, the El Arenal police station was made a municipality.

In 1925 the main square was built, having opened the streets and the beginning of the construction of the temple. In 1938, by decree number 4421, the municipality of El Arenal expands its large settlements.

== Geography ==
=== Situation ===
The municipality of Arenal is located in the northwest of the state, at coordinates 20º42'44 to 20º52'15 north latitude and 103º37'04 at 103º42'45 west longitude, at an altitude of 1450 meters above sea level.

=== Delimitation ===
It borders the municipalities of Amatitán to the north and west, to the south with Tala and to the east it borders Zapopan.

=== Extension ===
The extension of the El Arenal municipality is 111.8 km^{2} (43.2 sq mi).

=== Geology ===
It is considered within the Tertiary Period; The subsoil is made up of limestone, extrusive igneous rocks, rhyolite, andesite, basalt, tuff and volcanic gap.

=== Topography ===
Most of the municipality has semi-flat areas with elevations of 1550 to 1600 meters above sea level. They are followed in proportion by flat areas with elevations from 1400 to 1550 meters above sea level, and in a minimal proportion are rugged areas with elevations from 1600 to 1840 meters above sea level.

=== Hydrography ===
Belonging to the Lerma-Chapala-Santiago basin and the sub-basin of the Santiago-Cuisillos-Juchipila rivers; Its main currents are the Salado and Arenal rivers and the Las Tortugas, Arenal, Agua Dulce and Laguna Colorada streams.

=== Floors ===
The composition of the soil corresponds to those of the haplic Feozem type associated with the eutrophic Regosol and pelvic Vertisol.

=== Climate ===
The climate of the municipality has been classified as semi-dry; with winter and spring dry and semi-warm, with no defined winter season. The average annual temperature is 20 °C, And an average rainfall of 1,103.6 mm, with rainfall in the months of June and July. The prevailing winds are in the northwest direction. The annual average of days with frosts is 13.

=== Flora and fauna ===
The hills are covered with oak and spiny low vegetation. The hills and hillsides are covered with huizache, nopal, granjeno, cat's claw and some fruit trees. The fauna is represented by species such as deer, squirrel, rabbit, reptile and other minor species.

=== Natural resources ===
The natural wealth that the municipality has is represented by 900 hectares of forest. Its mineral resources are deposits of non-metallic elements: lime, quarry, sand, gravel, clay, kaolin, diatomite, quartz and feldspar.

== Social and communications infrastructure ==
Health care is provided by the Ministry of Health of the State Government and by the Mexican Social Security Institute (IMSS). The social welfare area is covered by the System for the Integral Development of the Family (DIF), through the Municipal Committee in support of its different programs. There are grocery stores in the municipal seat and other locations. In the municipal head there is a public market where the inhabitants of smaller towns buy products. There is also a civic plaza, sports centers and recreational centers. There are also sites with natural attractions such as the Las Tinajas temporary spa and the Las Tortugas dam. Home ownership is fundamentally private. Counting much of them with the services of drinking water, electricity and drainage. The predominant materials in the construction of the houses are mostly adobe and in a smaller proportion of partition walls, with tile roofs and brick vaults. With regard to basic services, 93.5% of the inhabitants have drinking water; in sewerage the coverage is 94.4% and in the electricity service 97.4%. Ground transportation can be done through the Mexico-Guadalajara-Nogales highway. It has a network of rural roads and dirt roads in the towns. The municipality is integrated into the state rail network, through the Guadalajara-Nogales-Mexicali line of the Pacific Rail System (recently privatized company). It has the service of direct line of trucks, as well as buses of passage. Regarding the media, there is mail, telegraph, telephone, radiotelephony and radio and television signal.

== Economy ==
The corn and agave crops stand out. Cattle of meat, milk and for work, pig and poultry are raised. The most developed industrial activity in this municipality is the elaboration of tequila. The manufacture of food products is also important and cold meats are packed. The mining resources available to the municipality are represented by non-metallic minerals such as lime, quarry, sand.

== Tourism ==
Santa Quintera is a hacienda located northeast of the town of El Arenal. The hacienda contains both agave fields as well as rocky hills with pine and holm oak forest. It is also home to the Mesa Alta archeological zone belonging to the Volador culture. It contains two Mesoamerican ballcourts along with a circular pyramid.

== Government ==
The form of government is democratic and depends on Jalisco state government, and federal government. Elections are held every three years, when the municipal president and her/his council are elected.

=== Municipal presidents ===
Municipal president	Term	Political party	Notes
Rosendo Ponce Lara	01-01-1983–31-12-1985	PRI	
Lorenzo López Hermosillo	01-01-1986–31-12-1988	PRI	
Carlos Rosales Torres	1989–1992	PRI	
Lourdes Vizcaíno González	1992–1995	PRI	
Rubén Rosales Jiménez	1995–1997	PAN	
Ricardo Sandoval González	01-01-1998–31-12-2000	PRI	
Rigoberto Ocampo Vázquez	01-01-2001–31-12-2003	PAN	
Rodrigo González Flores	01-01-2004–31-12-2006	PRI	
Joaquín González Lara	01-01-2007–31-12-2009	PAN	
Alejandro Romero Serna	01-01-2010–30-09-2012	PAN	
Alejandro Ocampo Aldana	01-10-2012–30-09-2015	PRI; PVEM	Coalition "Compromise for Jalisco"
Joaquín González Lara	01-10-2015–30-09-2018	PAN	
Jorge Abel Hermosillo Pulido	01-10-2018–30-09-2021	MC	
Jorge Martín Camarena Baltazar	01-10-2021–	Hagamos	
