= Mexican Federal Highway 70 =

Highway in Mexico

Federal Highway 70
- Carretera federal 70

Route information
- Maintained by Secretariat of Infrastructure, Communications and Transportation
- Length: 746.62 km (463.93 mi)

Major junctions
- East end: Fed. 80 / Fed. 180 in Tampico
- Fed. 85 in Ciudad Valles Fed. 69 in Rioverde; Fed. 57D in Santa Rita, San Luis Potosí; Fed. 57 / Fed. 80 in San Luis Potosí; Fed. 80 in Ojuelos de Jalisco; Fed. 45 in Aguascalientes; Fed. 71 in San Felipe, Aguascalientes; Fed. 15 near El Arenal, Jalisco Fed. GUA 10D near Tala, Jalisco
- West end: in Mascota, Jalisco

Location
- Country: Mexico

Highway system
- Mexican Federal Highways; List; Autopistas
| ← Fed. 69 | → Fed. 70D |

Federal Highway 70 (Carretera Federal 70) (Fed. 70) is a free (libre) part of the federal highways corridors (los corredores carreteros federales) of Mexico. The highway runs from its western end in the town of Mascota, Jalisco to its eastern end at Fed. 80 and Fed. 180 in Tampico, Tamaulipas.
