= Mexican Federal Highway 80 =

Highway in Mexico

Federal Highway 80
- Carretera federal 80

Route information
- Maintained by Secretariat of Infrastructure, Communications and Transportation
- Length: 962.23 km (597.90 mi)

Major junctions
- East end: Fed. 70 / Fed. 180 in Tampico, Tamaulipas
- Fed. 180 in Estación Manuel Fed. 81 in González; Fed. 85 in Ciudad Mante; Fed. 85 in Antiguo Morelos; Fed. 101 in Tula Junction, San Luis Potosí; Fed. 57 in El Huizache; Fed. 57 / Fed. 70 in San Luis Potosí City; Fed. 70 in Ojuelos de Jalisco; Fed. 45 in Lagos de Moreno; Fed. 80D in Valle de Guadalupe; Fed. 84 near Tepatitlán; Fed. 90 in Zapotlanejo; Fed. 80D in Tlaquepaque; Fed. 15 / Fed. 54 in Guadalajara; Fed. 15 / Fed. 54 in Acatlán de Juárez; Fed. 80D near San Patricio
- West end: Fed. 200 in San Patricio, Jalisco

Location
- Country: Mexico

Highway system
- Mexican Federal Highways; List; Autopistas
← Fed. 76	→ Fed. 81

Federal Highway 80 (Carretera Federal 80) connects Tampico, Tamaulipas, to San Patricio, Jalisco. Federal Highway 80 connects the city of Guadalajara to the south coast in Jalisco. The highway runs through the towns of Acatlán de Juárez, Villa Corona, Cocula, Tecolotlán, Unión de Tula, Autlán, La Huerta, Casimiro Castillo, and San Patricio (Melaque).

Federal Highway 80 is interrupted in two different sections (as outlined by the SCT) of the otherwise contiguous route: Along Mexican Federal Highway 57 for 109.62 km from San Luis Potosí City to El Huizache in San Luis Potosí and along Mexican Federal Highway 85 for 31.1 km from Antiguo Morelos to Ciudad Mante in Tamaulipas.
