= Zapotlanejo =

Zapotlanejo Zapotlán de los Tecuexes
- Town and municipality
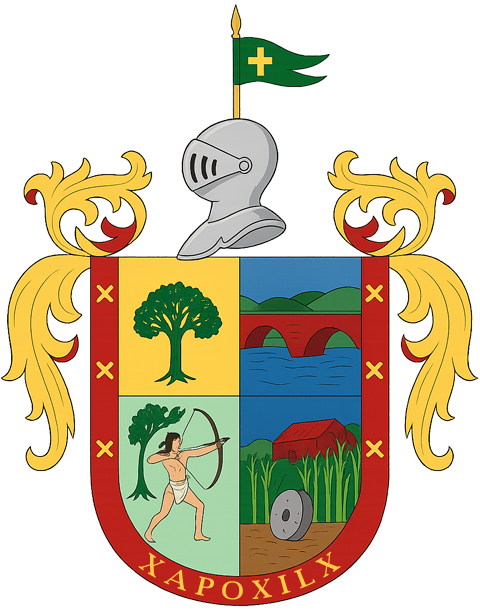
- Coat of arms

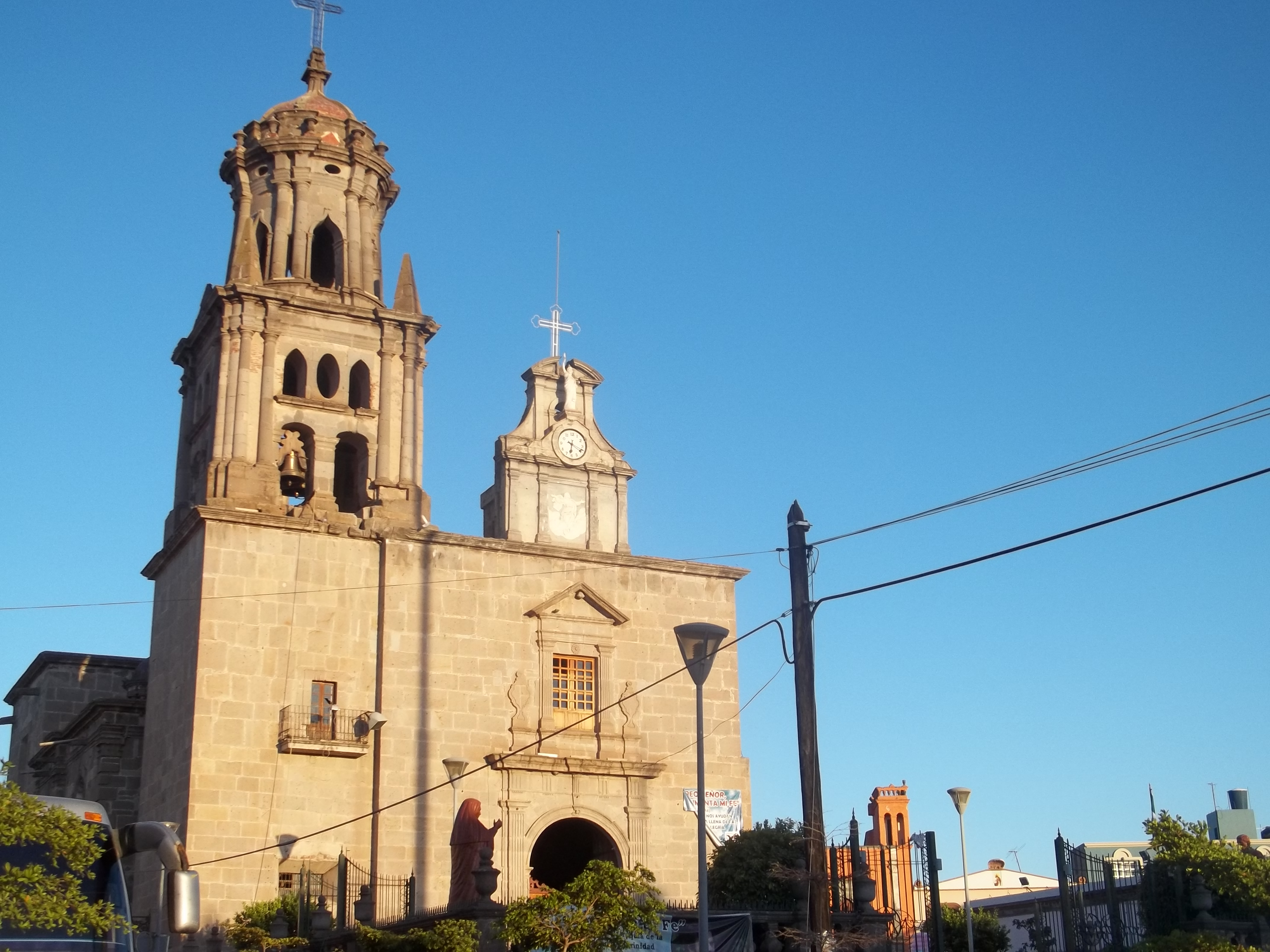
- Parroquia of nuestra señora del rosario

- Location within Mexico
- Coordinates: 20°37′22″N 103°4′8″W
- Country: Mexico
- State: Jalisco
- Municipality: Zapotlanejo

Area
  - Municipality: 718.8 km^{2} (277.5 sq mi)
  - Town: 8.62 km^{2} (3.33 sq mi)

Population (2020 census)
  - Municipality: 64,806
  - Density: 90.16/km^{2} (233.5/sq mi)
  - Town: 33,284
  - Town density: 3,860/km^{2} (10,000/sq mi)
- Demonym: Zapotlanejense
- Time zone: UTC-6 (Central (US Central))
- Postal code: 75430, 75883
- Website: www.zapotlanejo.com/

Zapotlanejo is a town and municipality in the Mexican state of Jalisco.

According to the 2020 census, there were 64,806 inhabitants in the municipality. The municipality has a territorial extension of 718.8 km^{2}.

== Toponymy ==
Zapotlanejo is a hybrid word, half Nahuatl and half Spanish. The Nahuatl word "Sapote" (from Nahuatl tzapotl) is a term for a soft, edible fruit and "tlan" (place). In addition, the name of the municipality includes the Spanish ending indicating locality "ejo."

== History ==
The town of Zapotlán was previously known as Zapotlán de los Tecuexes, alluding to the name of its pre-Hispanic inhabitants, the Tecuexes, who established themselves in the area about 1218.

Spanish settlement in the area began around 1523. The area's Spanish settlers were subject to continuous attacks by Chichimec forces during the early colonial period.

The municipality's famous Bridge of Calderón was constructed during the government of Francisco Calderón Romero (1670–1672). The bridge was the site of the Battle of the Bridge of Calderón in 1811, which was a key battle in the Mexican War of Independence.

In 1860, republican troops led by General Ignacio Zaragoza defeated Leonardo Márquez near the town as he fled from Tepatitlán.

In 1824, Zapotlanejo was made capital of the Department of Tonalá. In 1825, the town was made part of the first canton of Jalisco (Guadalajara). In 1887, Zapotlanejo was part of the fourth department of the first canton of the state. The community was afforded status as a municipality by decree of April 8, 1844.

The Dos Lunas Tequila brand is produced just outside town.

== Geography ==
=== Climate ===
Climate data for Zapotlanejo
Month	Jan	Feb	Mar	Apr	May	Jun	Jul	Aug	Sep	Oct	Nov	Dec	Year
Mean daily maximum °C (°F)	26 (79)	28.0 (82.4)	30.3 (86.5)	33 (91)	34.0 (93.2)	31.3 (88.3)	28.4 (83.1)	28.2 (82.8)	28 (82)	27.7 (81.9)	27.5 (81.5)	26.2 (79.2)	29.0 (84.2)
Mean daily minimum °C (°F)	6.6 (43.9)	7.6 (45.7)	9.0 (48.2)	11.3 (52.3)	14 (57)	16 (61)	15.5 (59.9)	15.3 (59.5)	14.9 (58.8)	12.3 (54.1)	9 (48)	7.3 (45.1)	11.6 (52.9)
Average precipitation mm (inches)	15 (0.6)	5.1 (0.2)	5.1 (0.2)	5.1 (0.2)	25 (1)	170 (6.7)	220 (8.8)	220 (8.6)	150 (5.8)	43 (1.7)	7.6 (0.3)	5.1 (0.2)	870 (34.4)
Source: Weatherbase

== Government ==
=== Municipal presidents ===
Municipal president	Term	Political party	Notes
Gregorio C. Álvarez	1915–1916		
Rosalío M. Barajas	1916–1917		
Mariano Dávalos	1917		
J. Rosario Orozco	1918		
Gregorio C. Álvarez	1918		
J. Rosario Orozco	1918		
Gregorio C. Álvarez	1918		
Fernando L. Hernández	1919		
Francisco Flores	1919		
Francisco Dávalos	1919		
Francisco Flores	1920		
J. Merced Reynoso	1920		
J. Rosario Orozco	1921		
Francisco Flores	1921		
J. Merced Reynoso	1922–1923		
Salvador Ruíz Gutiérrez	1923		
Francisco Flores	1924		
J. Trinidad Morales	1924		
J. Jesús Flores	1925		
Blas Hernández Ibarra	1926		
Alfonso Cervantes	1926		
J. Jesús Flores	1927		
J. Rosario Orozco	1928		
Andrés Orozco	1928		
J. Trinidad Cervantes	1928		
Alfonso Cervantes	1929		
Andrés Orozco	1929		
J. Trinidad Morales	1929	PNR	
J. Rosario Orozco	1930	PNR	
Gregorio C. Álvarez	1930	PNR	
J. Jesús Flores	1930	PNR	
J. Trinidad Morales	1931	PNR	
Pedro Flores	1932	PNR	
Francisco Robledo	1933	PNR	
Narciso D. Aceves	1933	PNR	
J. Jesús Casillas	1934–1935	PNR	
Salvador Ruiz Gutiérrez	1935–1936	PNR	
J. Trinidad Casillas	1937	PNR	
Angel R. Dávalos	1937	PNR	
J. Jesús Guillén	1938	PRM	
Apolinario Pulido Velasco	1939–1940	PRM	
J. Jesús Guillén	1941–1942	PRM	
Ignacio Castellanos Borrallo	1943	PRM	
Enrique Pérez de la Torre	1943–1944	PRM	
Apolinario Pulido Velasco	1944	PRM	
Miguel Pulido Velazco	1945–1946	PRM; PRI	
Apolinario Pulido Velasco	1947–1948	PRI	
Salvador Ruiz Gutiérrez	1949	PRI	
Juan Francisco Ríos Morales	1949	PRI	
Leopoldo Gutiérrez González	1950	PRI	
José Víctor Sandoval Beltrán	1951–1952	PRI	
Miguel Pulido Velasco	1953–1955	PRI	
Jesús Mendoza Lomelí	1956–1958	PRI	
Florentino Padilla Castellanos	1961	PRI	
Gregorio Álvarez Dávalos	1961	PRI	
Alfredo Álvarez Dávalos	1962–1964	PRI	
J. Jesús Fernández Carranza	1965–1967	PRI	
Jorge Humberto Sánchez	1968–1970	PRI	
Victorino Gómez Sandoval	1971–1973	PRI	
J. Jesús Aguilera Fernández	1974–1976	PRI	
Rigoberto Hernández Olivares	1977–1979	PRI	
Víctor Cervantes Álvarez	1980–1982	PRI	
Alfredo Álvarez Dávalos	1983–1985	PRI	
Pablo Coronado Lomelí	1986–1988	PRI	
Héctor Macías de la Torre	1989–1992	PRI	
Sixto Apolo Cervantes Álvarez	1992–1995	PAN	
Raúl Cano Flores	1995–1997	PAN	
Martín González Jiménez	01-01-1998–31-12-2000	PAN	
José Luis Cardona Domínguez	01-01-2001–31-12-2003	PAN	
Roberto Marín Nuño	01-01-2004–31-12-2006	PRI	
Héctor Álvarez Contreras	01-01-2007–31-12-2009	PAN	
Juan José Jiménez Parra	01-01-2010–30-09-2012	PVEM	
Francisco Javier Pulido Álvarez	01-10-2012–30-09-2015	PRI; PVEM	Coalition "Compromise for Jalisco"
Héctor Álvarez Contreras	01-10-2015–30-09-2018	MC	
Héctor Álvarez Contreras	01-10-2018–14-05-2021	MC	He applied for a temporary leave, to solve personal matters
Sandra Julia Castellón Rodríguez	14-05-2021–17-05-2021	MC	Acting municipal president
Héctor Álvarez Contreras	17-05-2021–30-09-2021	MC	Resumed
Gonzalo Álvarez Barragán	01-10-2021–	Morena	

== Culture ==
- Parque Festival México theme park.

== Twin towns – sister cities ==
Zapotlanejo is twinned with:

- Chanco, Chile
- Racine, United States
- San Antonio de los Baños, Cuba
