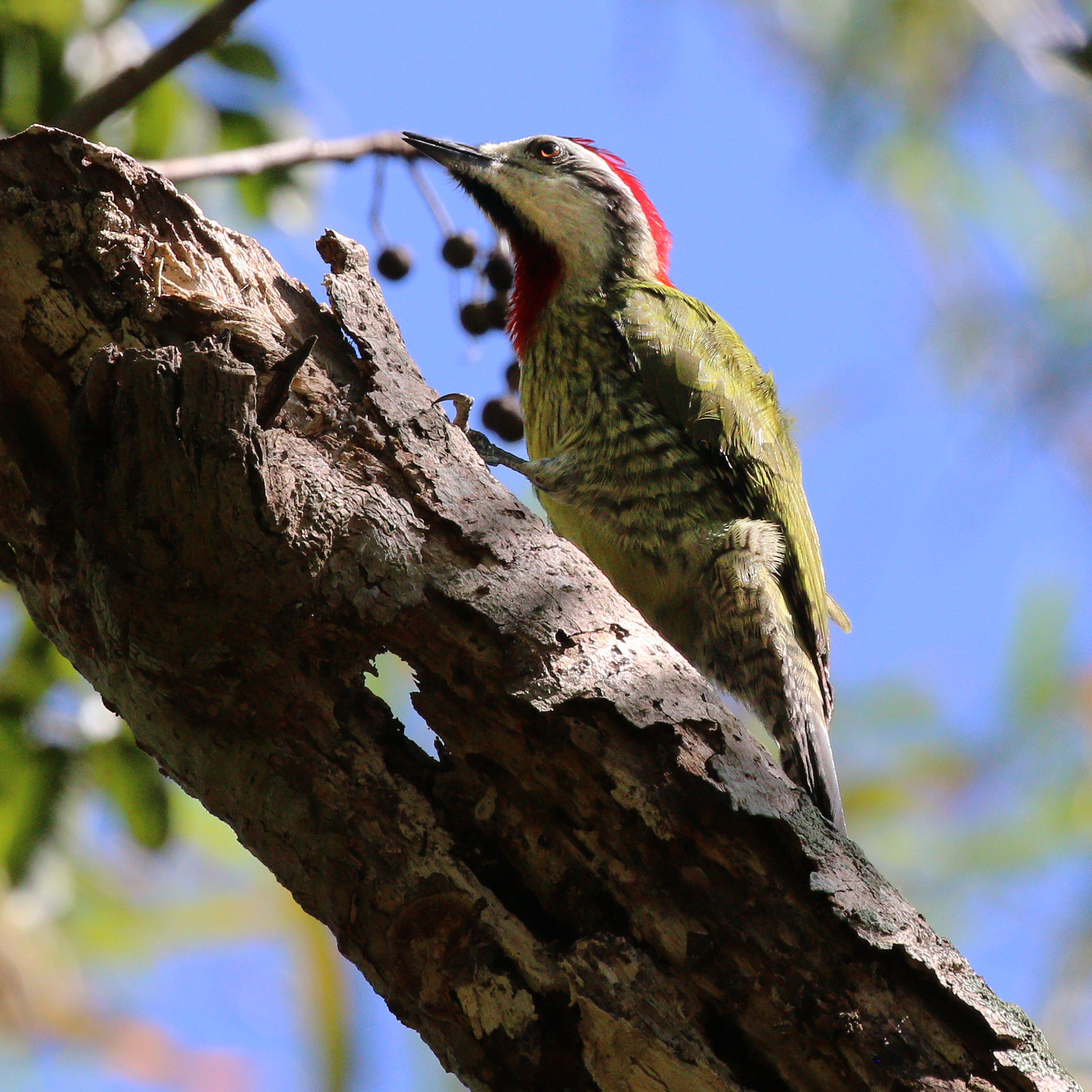
- Male (X. p. percussus)
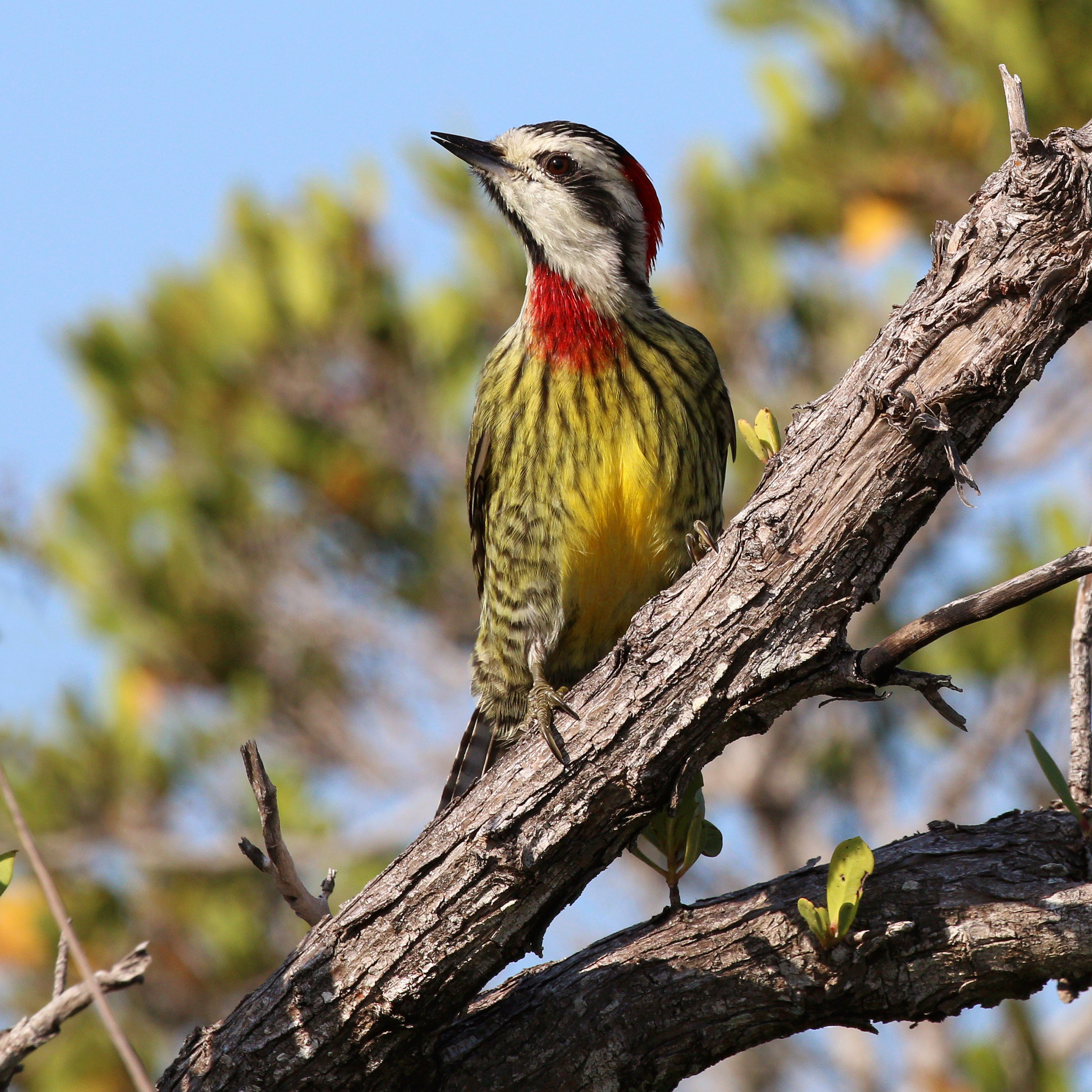
- Female (X. p. percussus)

Conservation status
- Least Concern (IUCN 3.1)

Scientific classification
- Kingdom: Animalia
- Phylum: Chordata
- Class: Aves
- Order: Piciformes
- Family: Picidae
- Genus: Xiphidiopicus; Bonaparte, 1854
- Species: X. percussus

Binomial name
- Xiphidiopicus percussus (Temminck, 1826)

= Cuban green woodpecker =

Species of bird

The Cuban green woodpecker (Xiphidiopicus percussus) is a species of woodpecker in the family Picidae and tribe Melanerpini, known locally in Cuban Spanish as carpintero verde (literally "green woodpecker"). It is the only species within the genus Xiphidiopicus and is one of two woodpeckers endemic to Cuba, along with the likely-extinct Cuban ivory-billed woodpecker. It is the most widespread and common woodpecker in Cuba, inhabiting primarily woodlands, as well as dry and wet forests, pine forests and mangroves. The population of the Cuban green woodpecker is stable and its status is listed as "Least Concern".

== Appearance ==
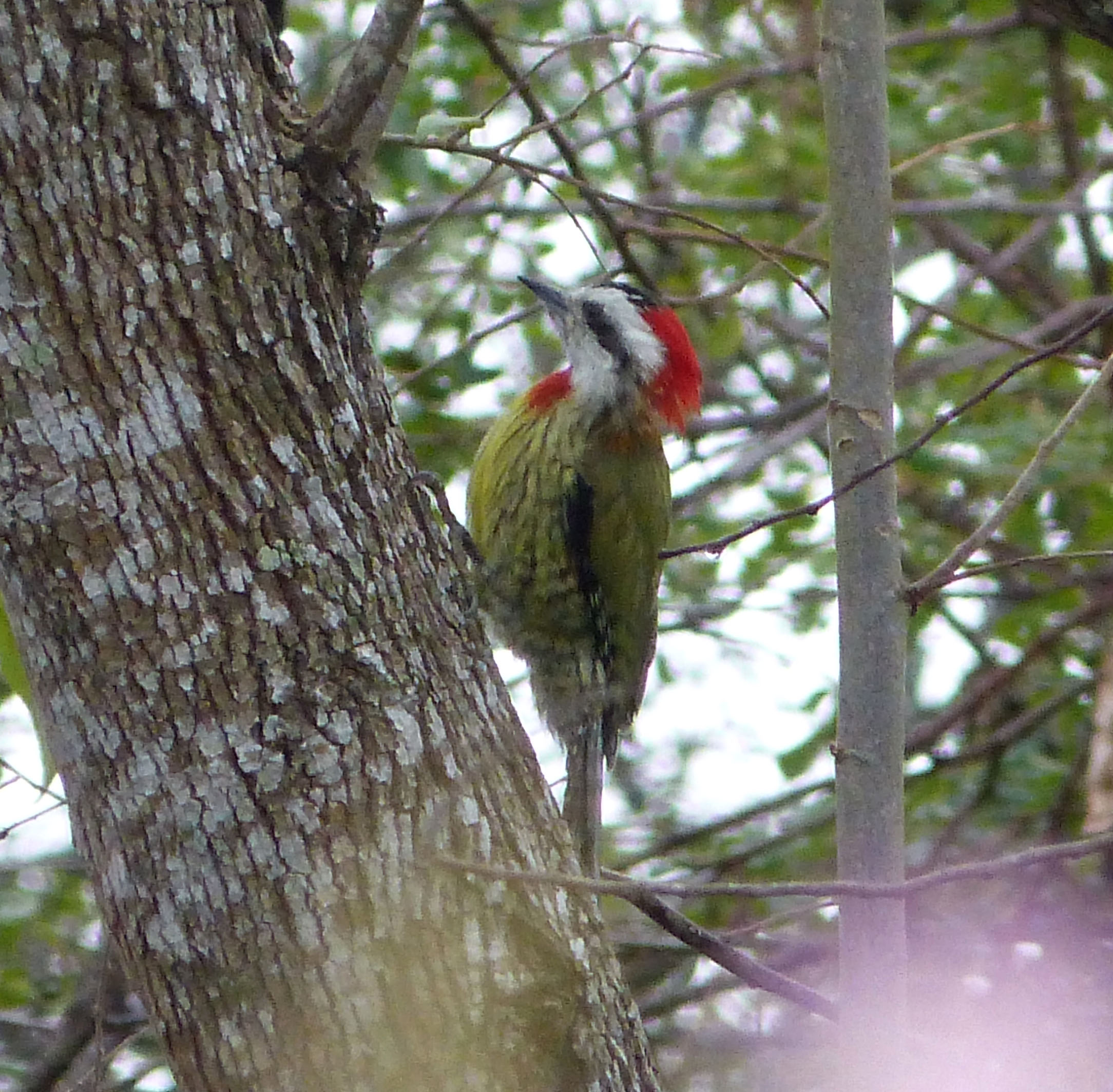
A male X.p percussus gripping a tree

A medium-sized and colorful bird, the Cuban green woodpecker is similar to a sapsucker in general shape and size. Featuring olive green overparts and yellow, streaked underparts, the Cuban green woodpecker usually appears crested, and features a bright red upper breast, as well as a black chin contrasting a white face and supercilium. In males, a red crown is present, while females possess black crowns with white stripes. The area around the cloaca, or the crissum, is yellow with black barring.

Its beak is short and straight with a progressively darkening coloration, from dark blue to black from base to tip dark blue to black coloration. They have been shown to have brown irises and grayish green tarsi and toes

Cuban green woodpeckers show slight sexually dimorphic qualities; females have shorter bills and are generally significantly smaller than their male counterparts. Juveniles will show more barring and streaking on their breasts and lack the depth of color adults have in their plumage.

They typically measure between 21 and 25 cm (8.3 and 9.8 in) in length and weigh approximately 48 to 97 g (1.7 to 3.4 oz).

== Taxonomy ==
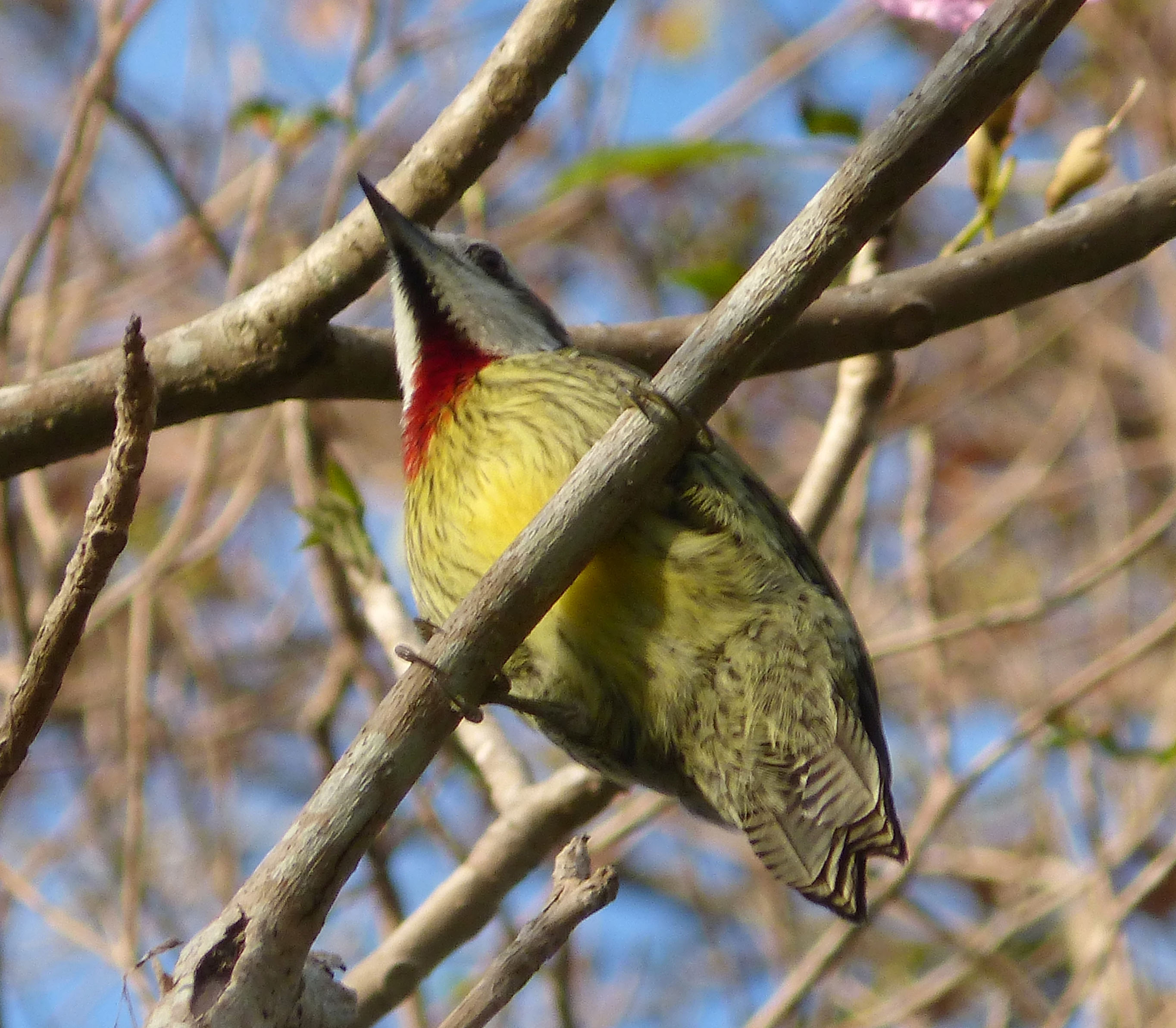
Underparts of a male Xiphidiopicus percussus

The Cuban green woodpecker as a species is unique in both genetics and appearance. Historically, it was presumed that the Cuban green woodpecker (Xiphidiopicus percussus), and the Hispaniolan woodpecker (Melanerpes striatus) were sister taxa and there was speculation that it had relationships to the genera Sphyrapicus and Melanerpes. According to research done in 2006, "X. percussus is the sister taxon to the Melanerpes woodpeckers, which appear to group into a single distinct clade." It was also found that Xiphidiopicus percussus is not the sister taxon to M. striatus and that the genus Sphyrapicus diverged earlier than Xiphidiopicus, which diverged during the late Miocene-early Pliocene, and originated in Central America or North America.

In terms of appearance, no other Cuban species of woodpecker has unmarked green upperparts. The Yellow-bellied Sapsucker (Sphyrapicus varius) is similar in coloration and also has a facial pattern that is reminiscent to that of the Cuban green woodpecker; however, the sapsucker's upperparts are white and black and it has a broad black band across its breast.

=== Subspecies ===
There are two currently recognized subspecies:

- X. p. insulaepinorum - found in the Cantiles Keys, Isla de la Juventud and Archipiélago Jardines de la Reina (Cayo Caballones)
- X. p. percussus - found on the archipelagos of Sabana and Camagüey

Subspecies not currently recognized include:

- X. p. cocoensis (synonymized with X. p. percussus)
- X. p. gloriae (synonymized with X. p. insulaepinorum)
- X. p. marthae (synonymized with X. p. insulaepinorum)
- X. p. monticola (synonymized with X. p. percussus)

== Habitat and distribution ==
The Cuban green woodpecker is only found in Cuba, but is extremely common on the island. Its natural habitats are wet and dry forests, mangroves, open woodland with palms, and pine forests, lowland moist forests, and heavily degraded former forest.

== Behavior ==
The Cuban green woodpecker is found most frequently in pairs, and less frequently in small groups. It is able to remain completely still for long periods and will forage for dead insects on dead limbs at any height within its habitat. They are very territorial, especially during breeding season, and use active vocalization, utilizing both drumming and vocal signals, and active pursuit, pursuing threats while flicking their wings, in order deter intruders in their nests, which is usually the West Indian woodpecker (Melanerpes superciliaris).

Similarly to all other woodpeckers, its flight is undulating.

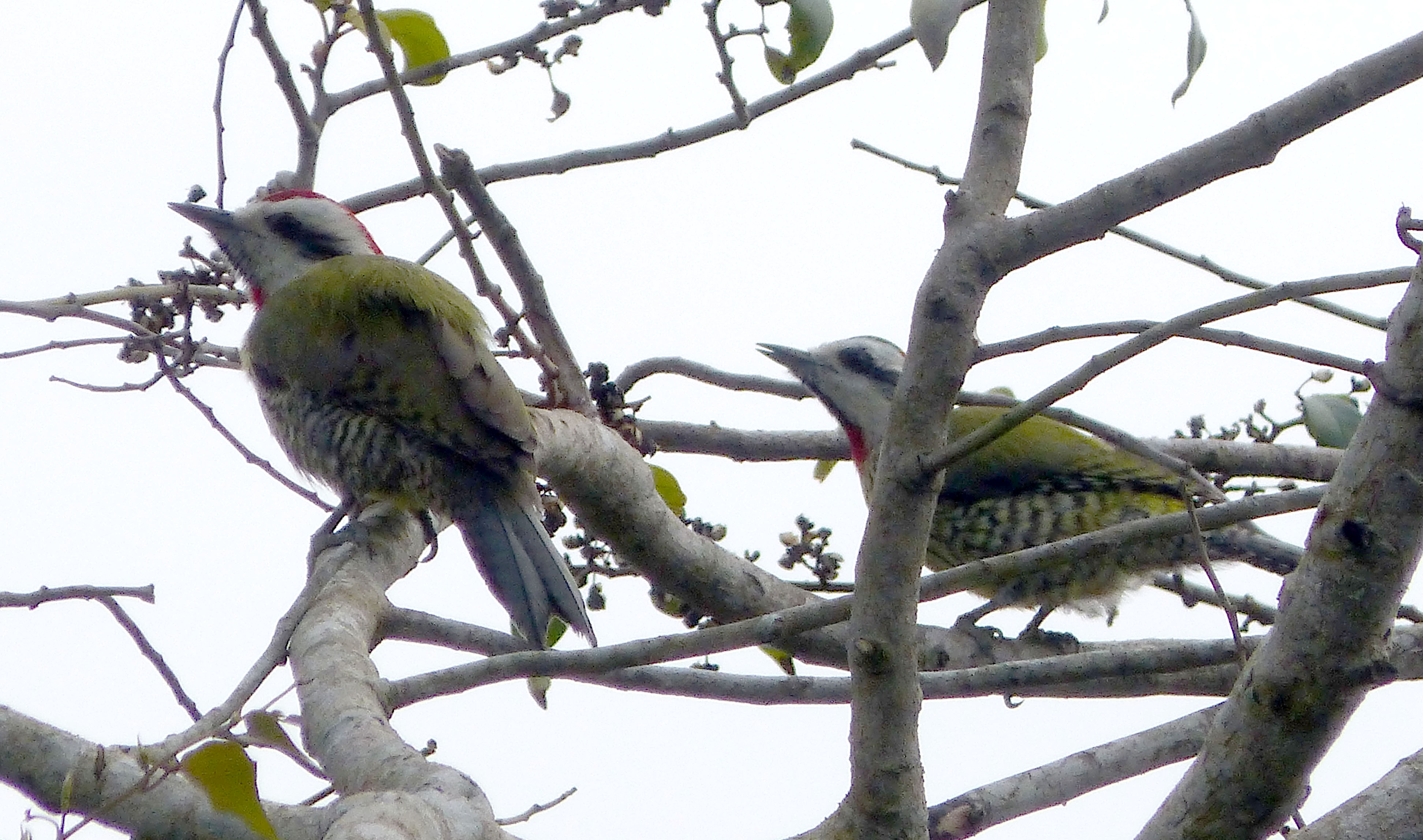
Pair of X. percussus perching on branches

=== Vocalizations ===
==== Calls and songs ====
The Cuban green woodpecker's call is a short, harsh "jhhhorr, jhhhorr, jhhhorr," as well as a higher pitched "yeh-yeh-yeh." The call is usually single noted with double notes occasionally being uttered.

It may sometimes produce a slurred, two-note call "ta-ha", which is similar to the Yellow-bellied Sapsucker (Sphyrapicus varius)'s call. It will use its call mostly while protecting nest and chicks from intruder.

==== Diet ====
The Cuban green woodpecker's is primarily an insectivore, focusing on large insects, but will also consume fruits and small frogs occasionally. It has also been documented taking eggs of other birds such as herons nesting in mangroves. It will also feed on flower nectar, especially Cordia sebestena. While perching itself on the plant or on a nearby branch to reach the flowers, it will insert its bill into the floral tube to drink the nectar for a few seconds; by doing so its bill will come into contact with anthers and stigma inside the floral tube, making the bird then act as a pollinator. Males and females utilize different ways to exploit food sources, as the male is larger than the female.

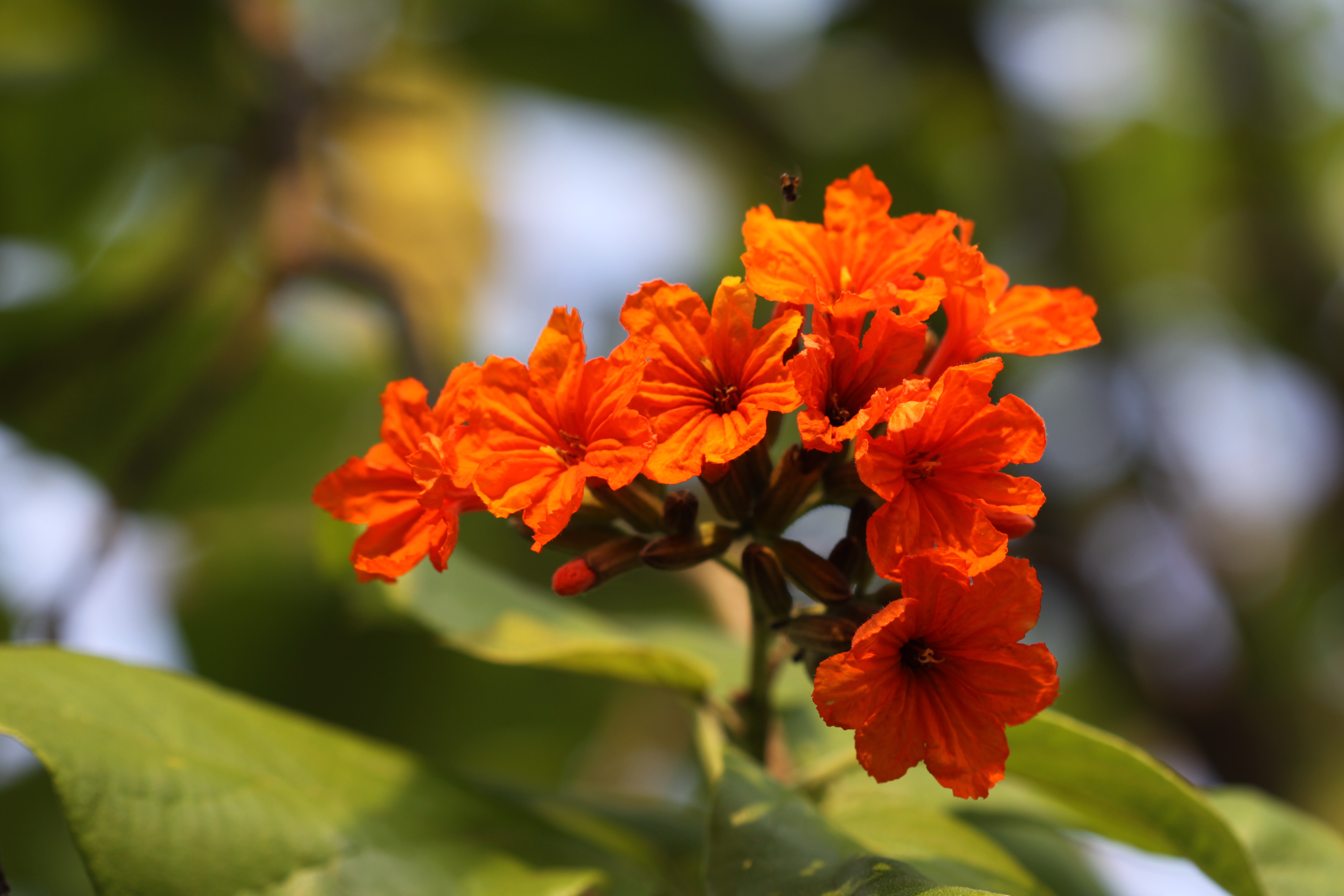
Cordia sebestena

=== Reproduction ===
==== Courtship ====
There is very little known about the courtship of the Cuban green woodpecker. Usually, woodpeckers perform flutter-aerial-display including a gliding flight with wings held well above the back, accompanied by calls. Courtship feeding by male to female most likely occurs as well. They are probably monogamous.

==== Breeding season, nesting and hatching ====
Cuban green woodpeckers will nest in the cavities of tree, alive or dead, often 4–5 metres above the ground. The male will usually do most of the excavation for the nest-hole, and will endure the nesting duties with a relatively high contribution. The breeding season takes place between February and August, with peak in May–June, probably associated with rains. The female will lay 3–4 white eggs and both adults share the incubation, which is presumed to be between 9 and 14 days, however more information is currently lacking, and feed the chicks, with the females feeding the nestlings at a higher rate. The chicks are hatched completely naked and stay in the nest for about 3–4 weeks. They are sexually mature in the first year of life.

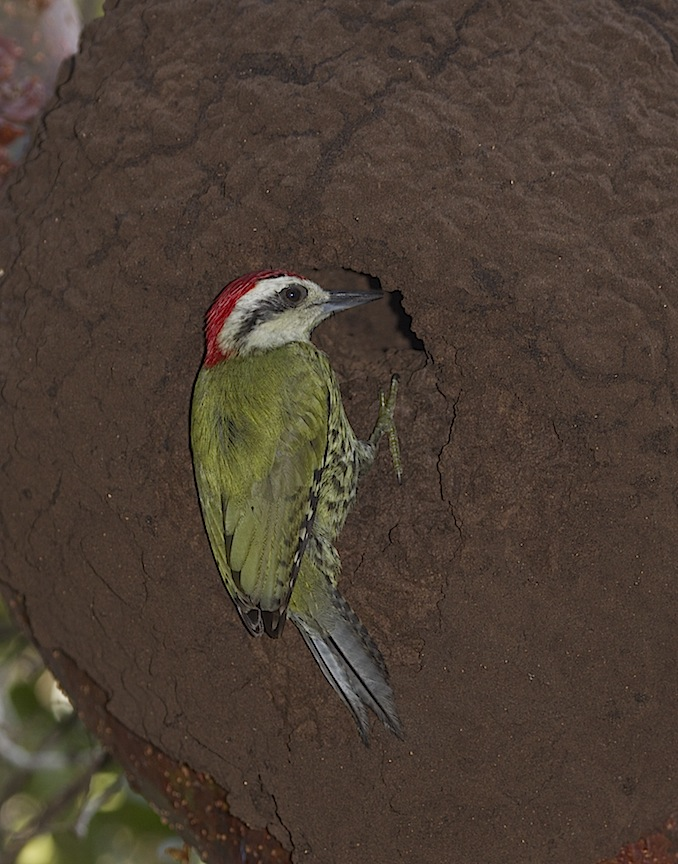
A male excavating a nest from an arboreal termite nest
