= Melanerpes shawi =

Melanerpes shawi Temporal range: Late Pleistocene

Scientific classification
- Kingdom: Animalia
- Phylum: Chordata
- Class: Aves
- Order: Piciformes
- Family: Picidae
- Genus: Melanerpes
- Species: M. shawi

Binomial name
- Melanerpes shawi Campbell & Bochenski, 2021

Extinct species of bird

Melanerpes shawi is an extinct species of woodpecker from the Pleistocene of California. It was found in the La Brea Tar Pits. It is part of the genus Melanerpes, which includes 23 extant species found across North and South America.

== History and naming ==
First described in 2021 based on a complete tarsometatarsus, M. shawi is known from at least 17 additional specimens that together with the holotype likely represent four different individuals. All the fossil material was found at the tar pits of Rancho La Brea, which date to the late Pleistocene.

The species is named after Christopher Shaw, who worked as a volunteer at the Rancho La Brea Tar Pits for several decades and was a former collections manager.

== Description ==
Melanerpes shawi can be differentiated from M. lewis based on a combination of multiple features. The intercondylar eminence of the tarsometatarsus has a wider base, while also generally being taller and more slender compared to its relative. The lateral cotyla is posterolaterally shorter and the hypotarsus does not expand as far laterally as in M. lewis. The articulation point for the fourth toe is shorter and the trochlea accessoria has its anterior border partly hidden by the trochlea of the third metatarsus. This differs from Lewis's woodpecker, in which the trochlea accessoria is clearly visible between the third and fourth trochleae.

The top outer edge of the scapula is narrower in this species compared to the bulky acromion of M. lewis. The acrocoracoid process is dorsally shorter and the articular surface for the humerus was dorsally longer. The coracoid additionally differs through the origin of the biceps, which almost overlaps with the aforementioned articular surface of the humerus. These two elements are not nearly as close in M. lewis. The head of the humerus extends further distally and is less rounded. The incisura capitis is not as deep as in the modern species, its bicipital crest not as pronounced, and the deltapectoral crest flares less. The ventral condyle is not as rounded as in M. lewis, and the lateral condyle smaller as a whole. The processus flexorius does not reach as far distally. The ulna has a smaller, less concave dorsal condyle, and the rim of this element is more rounded. The tuberculum lig. collateralis ventralis is much smaller than the shelf-like projection of Lewis's woodpecker. The depression caused by the brachialis muscle is shallow and not as pronounced. The radius has tendon furrows that are well defined on both sides of the bones, while in M. lewis, this is only visible on one of the sides. Several elements of the carpometacarpus are relatively broader or more robust than in other species.

The hindlimbs are also known. The femur has a short neck. The intercondylar notch of the tibiotarsus is narrow, which matches the tall intercondylar eminence found on the tarsometatarsus. The medial condyle protrudes less towards the front, while the lateral condyle's anterolateral element does not extend as far towards the sides. The cnemial crest extends straight towards the side, while it flares in Lewis's woodpecker.

Melanerpes shawi was similar in size to the extant Lewis's woodpecker, which is the largest member of the genus Melanerpes.

== Paleobiology ==
Melanerpes shawi is one of six species of woodpeckers known from Rancho La Brea. The largest of these was Breacopus garretti, a bird roughly the size of the pileated woodpecker, while the smallest was Bitumenpicus minimus. The most common woodpecker found there was the northern flicker (Colaptes auratus), likely due to its more ground-based lifestyle. The genus Melanerpes is present through a second species, as well, the still-living Lewis's woodpecker (M. lewis). The last species known from La Brea is the red-breasted sapsucker (Sphyrapicus ruber). The high diversity of woodpecker species may indicate that they evolved in relative isolation from other regions of North America, separated from them by mountains and deserts to the east.

Put together, this mix of species gives clues at the environment present around the tar pits during the Pleistocene. Breacopus may have needed tall trees to nest in given its large size, while both the red-breasted sapsucker and Lewis's woodpecker are known to inhabit open woodlands today, preferably forests consisting of oaks, aspen, and various conifers. Northern flickers are also known to inhabit more open environments, foraging on the ground.

== See also ==
- List of bird species described in the 2020s
