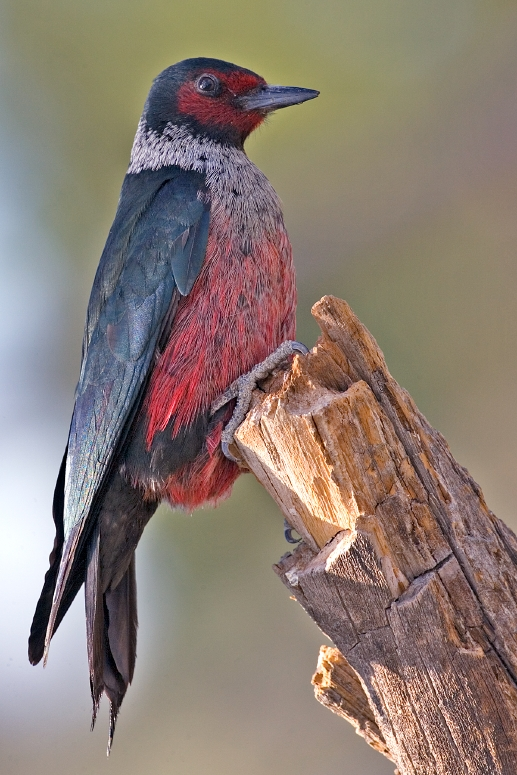

Conservation status
- Least Concern (IUCN 3.1)

Scientific classification
- Kingdom: Animalia
- Phylum: Chordata
- Class: Aves
- Order: Piciformes
- Family: Picidae
- Genus: Melanerpes
- Species: M. lewis

Binomial name
- Melanerpes lewis (G.R. Gray, 1849)

= Lewis's woodpecker =

Species of bird

Lewis's woodpecker (Melanerpes lewis) is a large North American species of woodpecker which ornithologist Alexander Wilson named after Meriwether Lewis. Lewis was one of the explorers who surveyed the areas bought by the United States of America as part of the Louisiana Purchase and first described this species of bird.

== Taxonomy ==
Lewis's woodpecker was described and illustrated in 1811 by the American ornithologist Alexander Wilson in his American Ornithology; or, the Natural History of the Birds of the United States. Wilson based his description on some bird skins that had been collected on an expedition across the western portion of the United States led by Meriwether Lewis and William Clark in 1803–1806. Wilson coined the English name "Lewis's woodpecker" and the binomial name Picus torquatus. Unfortunately, the specific epithet was preoccupied by the ringed woodpecker, Celeus torquatus (Boddaert, 1783), so in 1849, the English zoologist George Robert Gray coined a new name, Picus lewis. The type locality is Montana. Lewis's woodpecker is now placed in the genus Melanerpes that was erected by the English ornithologist William Swainson in 1832. The species is monotypic: no subspecies are recognised.

== Description ==
One of the largest species of American woodpeckers, Lewis's woodpecker can measure up to 10–11 inches (25–28 cm) in length. It is mainly reddish-breasted, blackish-green in color, with a black rump. It has a gray collar and upper breast, with a pinkish belly, and a red face. The wings are much broader than those of other woodpeckers, and it flies at a much more sluggish pace with slow, but even flaps similar to those of a crow. Its calls have a harsh sound relative to other woodpeckers', and it may use a repertoire of several phrases. They are one of the three largest Melanerpes woodpeckers in the world, being similar in size to the white woodpecker and the Jamaican woodpecker.

Measurements:

- Length: 10.2–11.0 in (26–28 cm)
- Weight: 3.1–4.9 oz (88–139 g)
- Wingspan: 19.3–20.5 in (49–52 cm)

== Range and Habitat ==
Lewis's woodpecker is locally common to the northwestern United States, dwelling mostly in open pine woodlands, and other areas with scattered trees and snags. Unlike other American woodpeckers, it enjoys sitting in the open as opposed to sitting in heavy tree cover. The migration patterns of the Lewis's Woodpecker are unclear due to their nomadic lifestyle and feeding habits. It ranges mostly in the western to central United States, but in the winter it can be found as far south as Southern California and the US border with Mexico. In the summer, it can be found as far north as Canada. It has been seen in five Midwestern states: South Dakota, Michigan, Illinois, Minnesota, and Wisconsin. Additionally, the woodpecker has been seen in California, Oregon, Washington, Idaho, Montana, Nevada, Colorado, New Mexico, Arizona, and Utah.

== Feeding ==
Lewis's woodpecker engages in some rather un-woodpecker-like behavior in its gregarious feeding habits. Although it does forage for insects by boring into trees with its chisel-like bill, the bird also catches insects in the air during flight (typical insect hawking). This is a habit that only a few other woodpeckers, such as the acorn woodpecker, the red-headed woodpecker, and the northern flicker, engage in. Lewis's woodpecker also feeds on berries and nuts, and will even shell and store nuts in cracks and holes in wood to store until winter. It will also feed at flat, open bird feeders, where it might act aggressively toward other birds.

== Breeding ==
Lewis's woodpecker nests in a cavity excavated from a dead tree branch. The Lewis's woodpecker, however, will not excavate its cavity, but instead nest in a pre-existing cavity in a tree. The nest is usually around 1 to 52 meters high from the ground. The female will lay between 5 and 9 eggs, which are plain white in coloration. Both mates incubate—the female during the day and the male at night. Incubation lasts approximately 12 days, after which the young will hatch. Both parents take turns equally caring for their young. After the young hatch, the parents give them insects "directly from the beak". The young leave the nest four to five weeks after hatching. If breeding was successful, the two lifelong mates may return to the same nest the following year.
