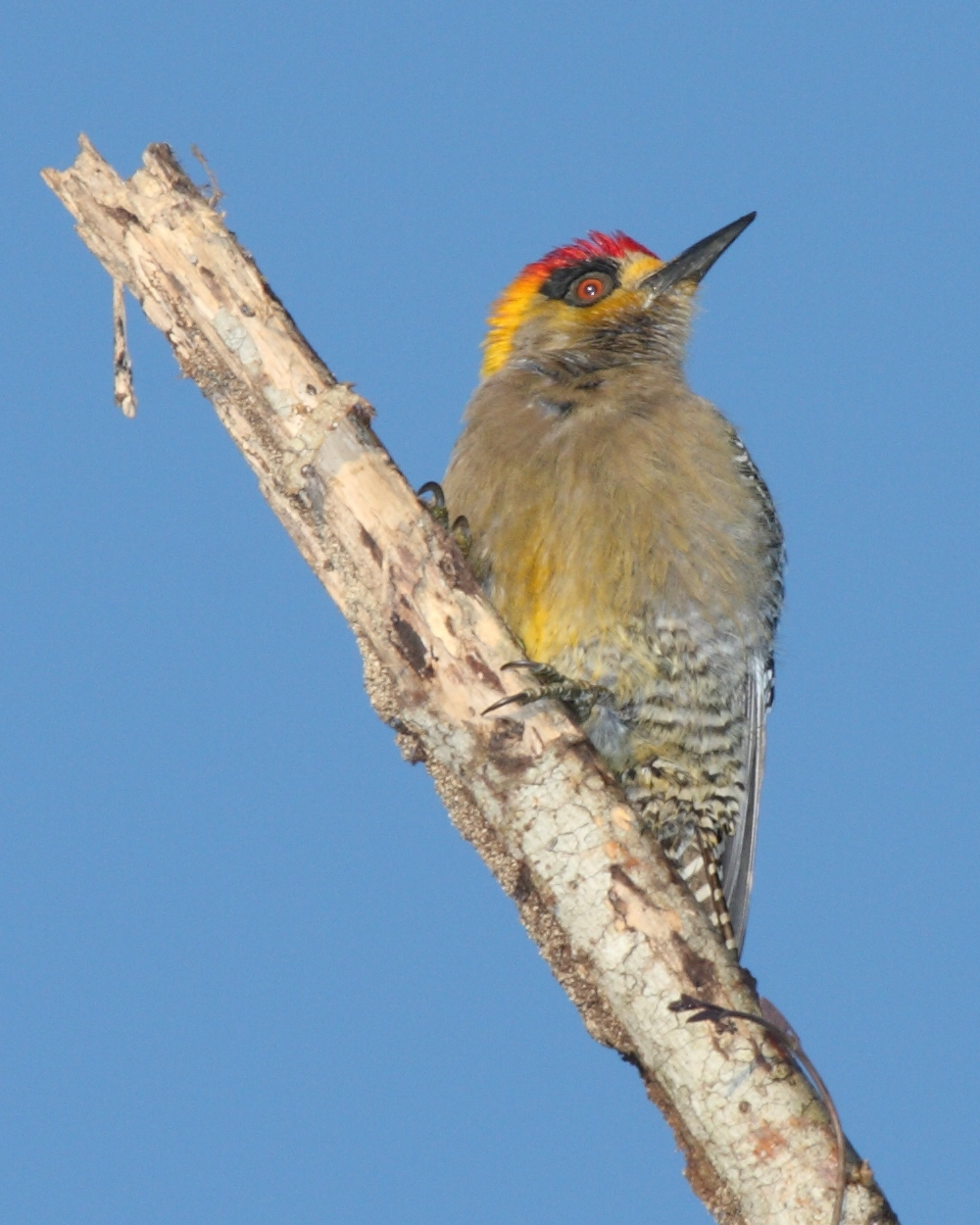

Conservation status
- Least Concern (IUCN 3.1)

Scientific classification
- Kingdom: Animalia
- Phylum: Chordata
- Class: Aves
- Order: Piciformes
- Family: Picidae
- Genus: Melanerpes
- Species: M. chrysogenys

Binomial name
- Melanerpes chrysogenys (Vigors, 1839)

= Golden-cheeked woodpecker =

Species of bird

The golden-cheeked woodpecker (Melanerpes chrysogenys) is a species of bird in subfamily Picinae of the woodpecker family Picidae. It is endemic to Mexico.

== Taxonomy and systematics ==
The golden-cheeked woodpecker has sometimes been placed in genus Centurus. It has two subspecies, the nominate M. c. chrysogenys (Vigors, 1839) and M. c. flavinuchus (Ridgway, 1911).

== Description ==
The golden-cheeked woodpecker is about 19 to 22 cm (7.5 to 8.7 in) long and weighs 55 to 88 g (1.9 to 3.1 oz). The sexes' plumage is alike except for their head pattern. Adult males of the nominate subspecies have a whitish forehead, a red crown, and a yellow-gold nape and hindneck. Adult females have the same whitish forehead but a grayish-buff crown and an orange-red nape. In both sexes a wide black area surrounds the eye. Their upperparts are barred black and white; the black is widest on the rump and uppertail coverts. Their flight feathers are black with white bars throughout. Their tail is black with white bars on the central pair of feathers and progressively more white on each pair out from them. Their lores and under the eye are deep golden-yellow and their cheeks, chin, and throat are golden-buff. Their underparts are mostly gray-brown to brownish-buff with a strong olive-yellow wash and a yellowish orange patch on the central belly. Their lower flanks and undertail coverts are grayer with dark bars. Their bill is longish and black, their iris is reddish to orange-brown, the bare skin around the eye blackish, and the legs green-gray. Juveniles have grayer or browner upperparts with less contrasting barring than adults, and paler and grayer underparts with a strong yellow cast and obscure bars. Both sexes have red on their crown but females less than males and often more black. Subspecies M. c. flavinuchus is slightly larger and duller than the nominate, has less yellow on its face and yellow instead of red on its hindneck, and has grayer underparts.

== Distribution and habitat ==
The nominate subspecies of golden-cheeked woodpecker is found in western Mexico between Sinaloa and Nayarit. M. c. flavinuchus is found from Jalisco in west central Mexico south along the coast to Oaxaca and east to Puebla. The species inhabits the interior and edges of mesophytic to xeric forest and more open landscapes like patches of forest, savanna with trees, and plantations. In elevation it ranges from sea level to about 1,500 m (4,900 ft).

== Behavior ==
=== Movement ===
The golden-cheeked woodpecker is a year-round resident throughout its range.

=== Feeding ===
The golden-cheeked woodpecker feeds both on insects like ants and adult and larval beetles, and also on fruits and seeds. It forages on trees from their middle to upper levels, singly or in pairs, and gleans, probes, and pecks for its food.

=== Breeding ===
The golden-cheeked woodpecker's breeding season is from May to July. It excavates its nest hole in a tree or cactus. Nothing else is known about its breeding biology.

=== Vocalization ===
The golden-cheeked woodpecker makes a variety of vocalizations including a "nasal 'ki-di-dik'", a "loud, nasal 'cheek-oo, cheek-oo, cheek-oo, keh-i-heh-ek'" and a "softer 'keh-i-heh' or 'kuh-uh-uh'."

== Status ==
The IUCN has assessed the golden-cheeked woodpecker as being of Least Concern. It has a large range and its estimated population of at least 50,000 mature individuals is believed to be stable. No immediate threats have been identified. It is "[c]ommon to fairly common; widespread within range, [and] recorded at numerous sites." However, it is not well known and needs research on its breeding biology.
