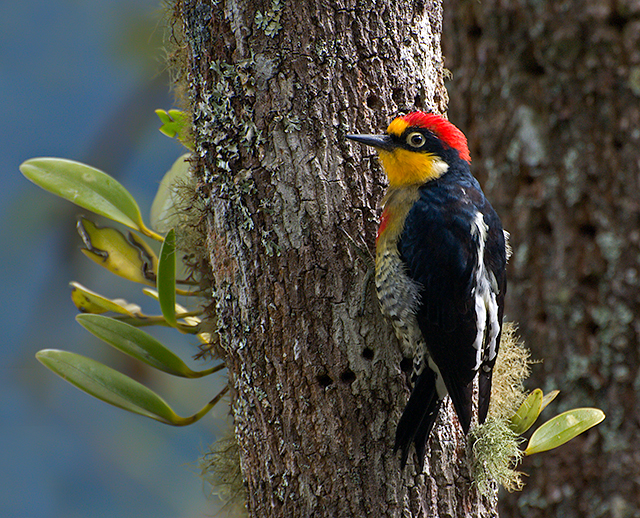

Conservation status
- Least Concern (IUCN 3.1)

Scientific classification
- Kingdom: Animalia
- Phylum: Chordata
- Class: Aves
- Order: Piciformes
- Family: Picidae
- Genus: Melanerpes
- Species: M. flavifrons

Binomial name
- Melanerpes flavifrons (Vieillot, 1818)

= Yellow-fronted woodpecker =

Species of bird

The yellow-fronted woodpecker (Melanerpes flavifrons) is a species of bird in the family Picidae. It is found in Brazil, Paraguay and far north-eastern Argentina. Its natural habitats are subtropical or tropical moist lowland forests and heavily degraded former forest. It is a fairly common bird with a wide range, and the International Union for Conservation of Nature has classified its conservation status as "least concern".

== Description ==
This colourful woodpecker is about 18 cm (7 in) long. The sexes are similar apart from the male having a red crown and nape, while this region in the female is bluish black. Both have a yellow fore-crown, cheeks, chin, and throat, and a broad, black band running from the base of the beak, across the eye to the nape. The mantle and upper wings are mainly black, and the back and rump are white. The tail is black with some white barring on the outer feathers. The breast is grey or olive, the belly red, and the flanks barred in black and white or black and buff. The iris is blue-black and the distinct orbital ring is yellowish or orange. The beak is black and the legs and feet olive brown. The juvenile is similar to the adult but less glossy and rather browner, with less red on the belly and crown.

== Distribution and habitat ==
The yellow-fronted woodpecker is native to eastern South America. Its range includes eastern and southeastern Brazil, eastern Paraguay, and northeastern Argentina, at altitudes from sea level to about 1,800 m (6,000 ft). It is a resident, nonmigratory species and is found in sparsely forested areas, gallery forests, secondary forests, palm groves, orchards, gardens, and parkland, especially places where isolated trees are left standing in an otherwise cleared area.

== Ecology ==
The species has a mixed diet consisting mainly of berries and fruits, but including seeds and insects and their larvae. Breeding takes place between January and May in most of the range. Nestlings have been observed being fed fruits, and both insects and fruits are sometimes cached for later use. This species is a cooperative breeder, with a number of birds nesting in close proximity and some acting as nonbreeding helpers.

== Status ==
M. flavifrons has a very wide range and is described as a fairly common species. Although its population trend is not known, its total population is large and any decrease in population size is slow, so the International Union for Conservation of Nature has classified its conservation status as "least concern".
