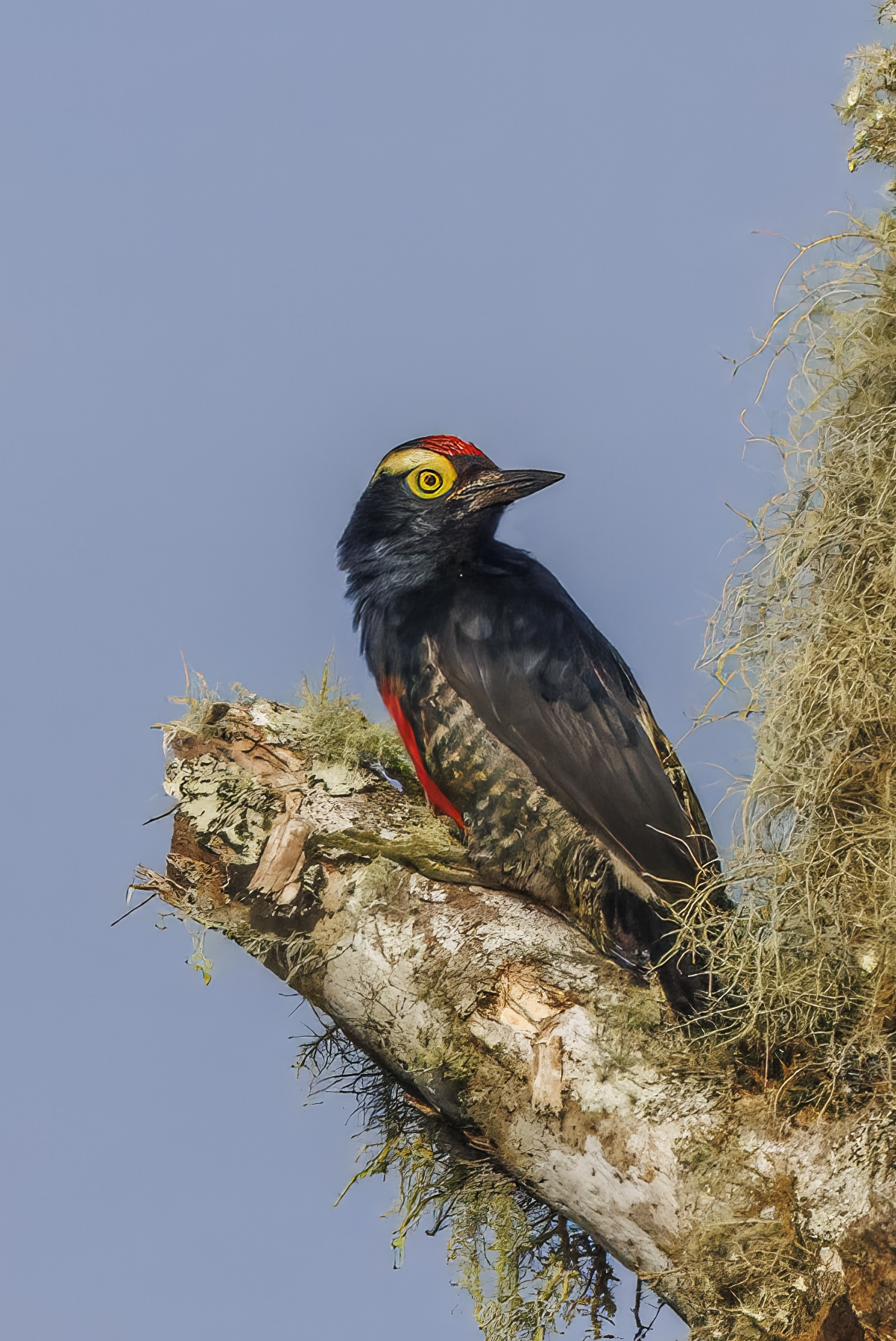
- Male, Ecuador

Conservation status
- Least Concern (IUCN 3.1)

Scientific classification
- Kingdom: Animalia
- Phylum: Chordata
- Class: Aves
- Order: Piciformes
- Family: Picidae
- Genus: Melanerpes
- Species: M. cruentatus

Binomial name
- Melanerpes cruentatus (Boddaert, 1783)
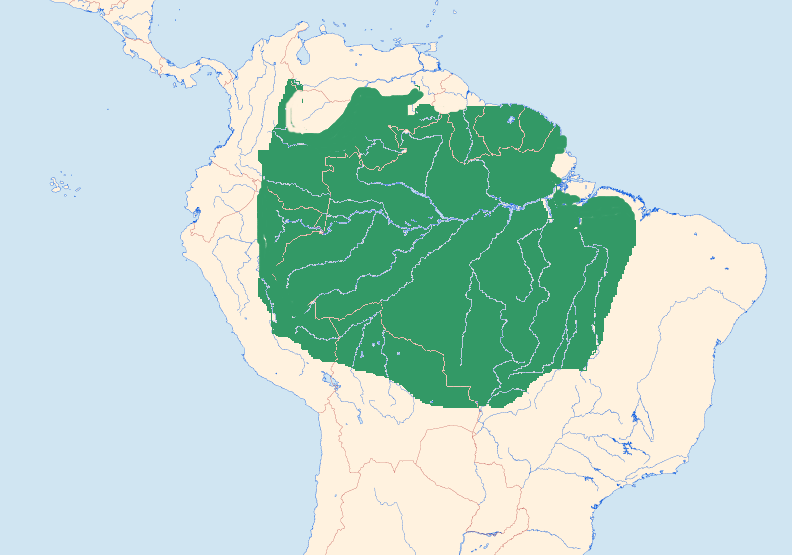

= Yellow-tufted woodpecker =

Species of bird

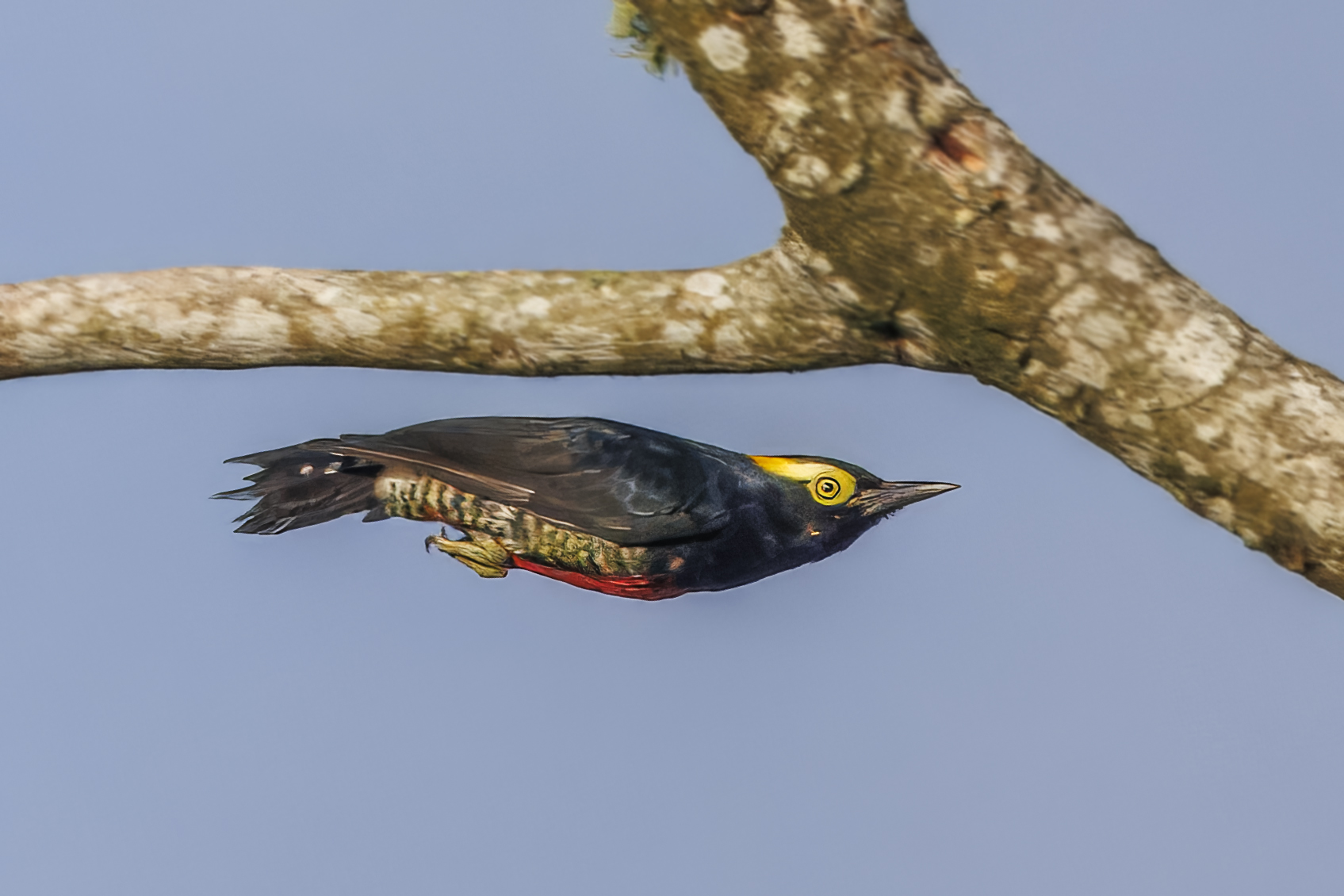
female in flight, Ecuador

The yellow-tufted woodpecker (Melanerpes cruentatus) is a species of woodpecker. It is found in Bolivia, Brazil, Colombia, Ecuador, French Guiana, Guyana, Peru, Suriname, and Venezuela. Its natural habitats are subtropical or tropical moist lowland forests and heavily degraded former forest.

== Taxonomy ==
The yellow-tufted woodpecker was described by the French polymath Georges-Louis Leclerc, Comte de Buffon in 1780 in his Histoire Naturelle des Oiseaux from a specimen collected in Cayenne, French Guiana. The bird was also illustrated in a hand-coloured plate engraved by François-Nicolas Martinet in the Planches Enluminées D'Histoire Naturelle which was produced under the supervision of Edme-Louis Daubenton to accompany Buffon's text. Neither the plate caption nor Buffon's description included a scientific name but in 1783 the Dutch naturalist Pieter Boddaert coined the binomial name Picus cruentatus in his catalogue of the Planches Enluminées. The yellow-tufted woodpecker is now placed in the genus Melanerpes that was introduced by the English ornithologist William Swainson in 1832. The species is monotypic. The generic name combines the Ancient Greek melas meaning "black" with herpēs meaning "creeper". The specific epithet cruentatus is Latin for "blood-stained".

== Description ==
An adult is about 20 cm (8 in) long. The upper parts are mostly bluish-black, as are the cheeks, chin, throat and chest. The breast and belly are red, although the amount of red is variable, and the flanks and lower belly have black and white undulating barring. The rump and upper tail-coverts are white, this being noticeable in flight, and the tail is black. The underside of the wing is barred in black and white. The beak is blackish, the legs grey, and the iris and orbital ring are yellow. The male differs from the female in having a red fore- and mid-crown while the female has these parts black. In northern and western races, the brow is yellow, cream or buff, and the hind-crown ha yellow or golden feathers, these often being tufted, but in southern races, these areas are black. Juveniles are similar to the adults but the upper parts are browner and the underparts are greyer; juveniles of both sexes have some red on the crown and the belly is more orange than red.

== Distribution and habitat ==
The yellow-tufted woodpecker is native to northern South America. Its range includes eastern Colombia, western and southern Venezuela, the Guianas, northern and central Brazil, eastern Ecuador, eastern Peru and eastern Bolivia. Its altitudinal range is from sea level to about 1,200 m (3,900 ft), and even higher in Ecuador. It is a species of open humid forest, both varzea and terra firme forest, and is also found in secondary forest, woodland verges and burnt out areas with isolated standing trees. It is a non-migratory species.

== Behaviour and ecology ==
The species is social and gregarious and often forages in groups. Its diet is omnivorous, consisting principally of insects, some of which are caught on the wing, and fruits.

== Status ==
With the destruction of the Amazon rainforest, the habitat of this woodpecker is being degraded and the population is thought to be in gradual decline. However, it is a common bird with a very wide range, and the International Union for Conservation of Nature has assessed its conservation status as being of "least concern".
