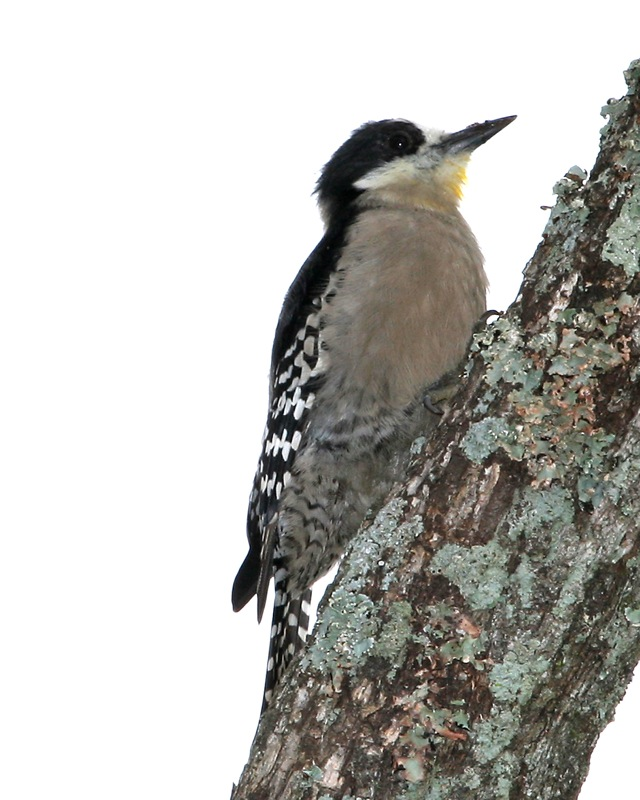

Conservation status
- Least Concern (IUCN 3.1)

Scientific classification
- Kingdom: Animalia
- Phylum: Chordata
- Class: Aves
- Order: Piciformes
- Family: Picidae
- Genus: Melanerpes
- Species: M. cactorum

Binomial name
- Melanerpes cactorum (D'Orbigny, 1840)

= White-fronted woodpecker =

Species of bird

The white-fronted woodpecker (Melanerpes cactorum) is a species of bird in the family Picidae. It is found mainly in Bolivia, Paraguay and Argentina. Its natural habitats are subtropical or tropical dry forests, subtropical or tropical dry shrubland, and subtropical or tropical high-altitude shrubland.

== Description ==
The adult white-fronted woodpecker is about 17 cm (7 in) in length. The sexes are similar in appearance except for a small patch of red, not always visible, on the crown in males. The crown, nape and upper parts are glossy black, apart from a thin white line running from a white nape patch down the centre of the back. A black mask surrounds the eye and extends to the mantle. The upper side of the wings is bluish-black, boldly barred with white, and the underside is browner. The upper side of the tail is black with white markings and the underside is browner. The fore-crown and cheeks are white, and the chin and throat are white, yellow or buff. The breast and belly are some shade of grey, with indistinct barring on the flanks and lower belly. The iris is reddish-brown, the beak greyish-black and the legs grey. Juveniles are similar to the adults but are generally a duller black, the underparts being more heavily barred, and both sexes having traces of red or orange on the mid-crown.

== Distribution and habitat ==
The white-fronted woodpecker is native to central South America. Its range includes southeastern Peru, Bolivia, Uruguay, northern Argentina, Paraguay and southeastern Brazil. Its typical habitat is chaco, savannah and semi-desert with scattered trees, shrubs and cacti. It also occurs in palm groves, gallery forest and agricultural land with scattered trees. It lives at altitudes of up to 2,500 m (8,000 ft). It is a non-migratory, sedentary species.

== Status ==
This woodpecker has a very extensive range, the population seems stable and no particular threats have been recognised. It is described as a common species and the International Union for Conservation of Nature has assessed its conservation status as being of "least concern".
