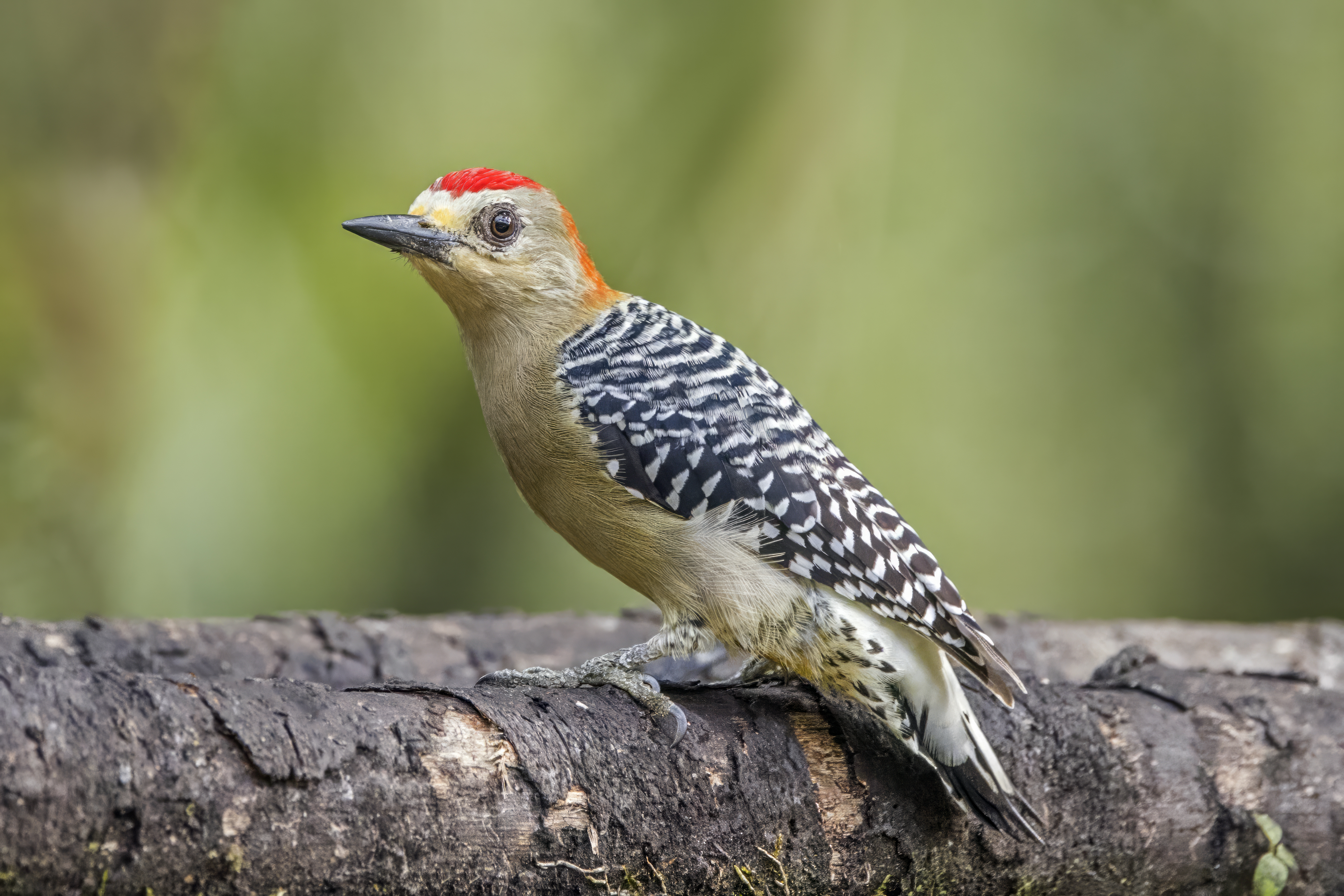
- Male
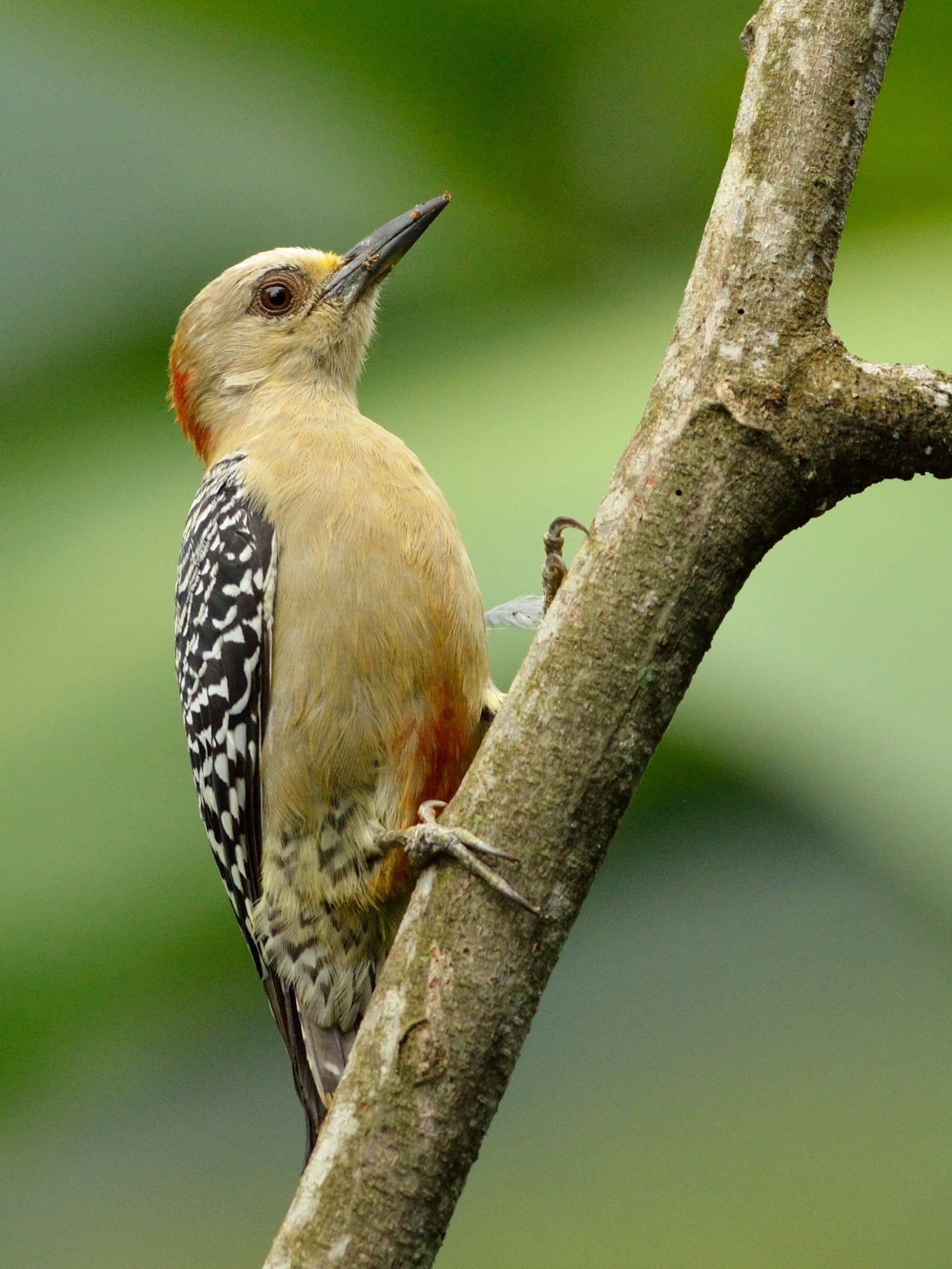
- Female both M. r. rubricapillus, Colombia

Conservation status
- Least Concern (IUCN 3.1)

Scientific classification
- Kingdom: Animalia
- Phylum: Chordata
- Class: Aves
- Order: Piciformes
- Family: Picidae
- Genus: Melanerpes
- Species: M. rubricapillus

Binomial name
- Melanerpes rubricapillus (Cabanis, 1862)

Synonyms
- Melanerpes subelegans

= Red-crowned woodpecker =

Species of bird

The red-crowned woodpecker (Melanerpes rubricapillus) is a species of bird in the subfamily Picinae of the woodpecker family Picidae. It is found in Costa Rica, Panama, Colombia, Venezuela, Guyana, Suriname, and Tobago.

== Taxonomy and systematics ==
The red-crowned woodpecker has sometimes been placed in the genus Centurus. It has also sometimes been treated as conspecific with the Yucatan woodpecker (M. pygmaeus) and some authors consider them a superspecies.

The red-crowned woodpecker has these four subspecies:

- M. r. rubricapillus (Cabanis, 1862)
- M. r. subfusculus (Wetmore, 1957)
- M. r. seductus Bangs, 1901
- M. r. paraguanae (Gilliard, 1940)

The validity of subspecies M. r. paraguanae has been challenged, and some other subspecies have been proposed but not accepted as valid.

== Description ==
The red-crowned woodpecker is 16 to 18.5 cm (6.3 to 7.3 in) long and weighs 40 to 65 g (1.4 to 2.3 oz). The sexes' plumage is alike except for their head pattern. Adult males of the nominate subspecies have a pale yellow to whitish forehead, a bright red crown, and an orange-red nape and hindneck. Adult females have the same pale yellow to whitish forehead but a pale gray-buff to whitish crown and a reddish to orange-red nape and hindneck. Both sexes' cheeks, chin, and throat are grayish-buff. Their mantle and back are barred black and white and the rump and uppertail coverts are unbarred white. Their flight feathers are black with white bars throughout. Their tail is black with white bars on the central and outermost pairs of feathers. Their underparts are variable but usually buffish-gray to gray-buff with an olive or yellowish wash and a reddish to orange-red patch on the central belly. Their lower flanks and undertail coverts have black bars. Their bill is longish and blackish, their iris is red to brown, the bare skin around the eye gray-brown, and the legs gray. Juveniles are duller and browner than adults, their nape and hindneck are paler, their upperparts' bars less contrasting, their underparts often lightly streaked, and their belly patch paler and somewhat mottled.

Subspecies M. r. subfusculus is slightly smaller than the nominate and has darker underparts whose breast and sides are deep gray-brown. M. r. seductus has a somewhat darker breast than the nominate and the female has more red on the nape. M. r. paraguanae has a paler yellow forehead than the nominate, a buff-brown nape and yellower hindneck, wider white bars on its upperside, and a golden-yellow belly patch.

== Distribution and habitat ==
The subspecies of red-crowned woodpecker are found thus:

- M. r. rubricapillus, from southwestern Costa Rica through Panama into northern and central Colombia, in the northern half of Venezuela, in Guyana and Suriname, and on Tobago
- M. r. subfusculus, Coiba Island off southwestern Panama
- M. r. seductus, Isla del Rey off southeastern Panama
- M. r. paraguanae, the Paraguaná Peninsula of northwestern Venezuela

The red-crowned woodpecker inhabits a wide variety of landscapes, both wet and dry. These include the interior, clearings, and edges of mature deciduous forests, secondary forests, coastal scrublands, mangroves, plantations and gardens. In elevation, it mostly occurs from sea level to 1,700 m (5,600 ft) but reaches as high as 1,900 m (6,200 ft) in Venezuela.

== Behavior ==
=== Movement ===
The red-crowned woodpecker is a year-round resident throughout its range.

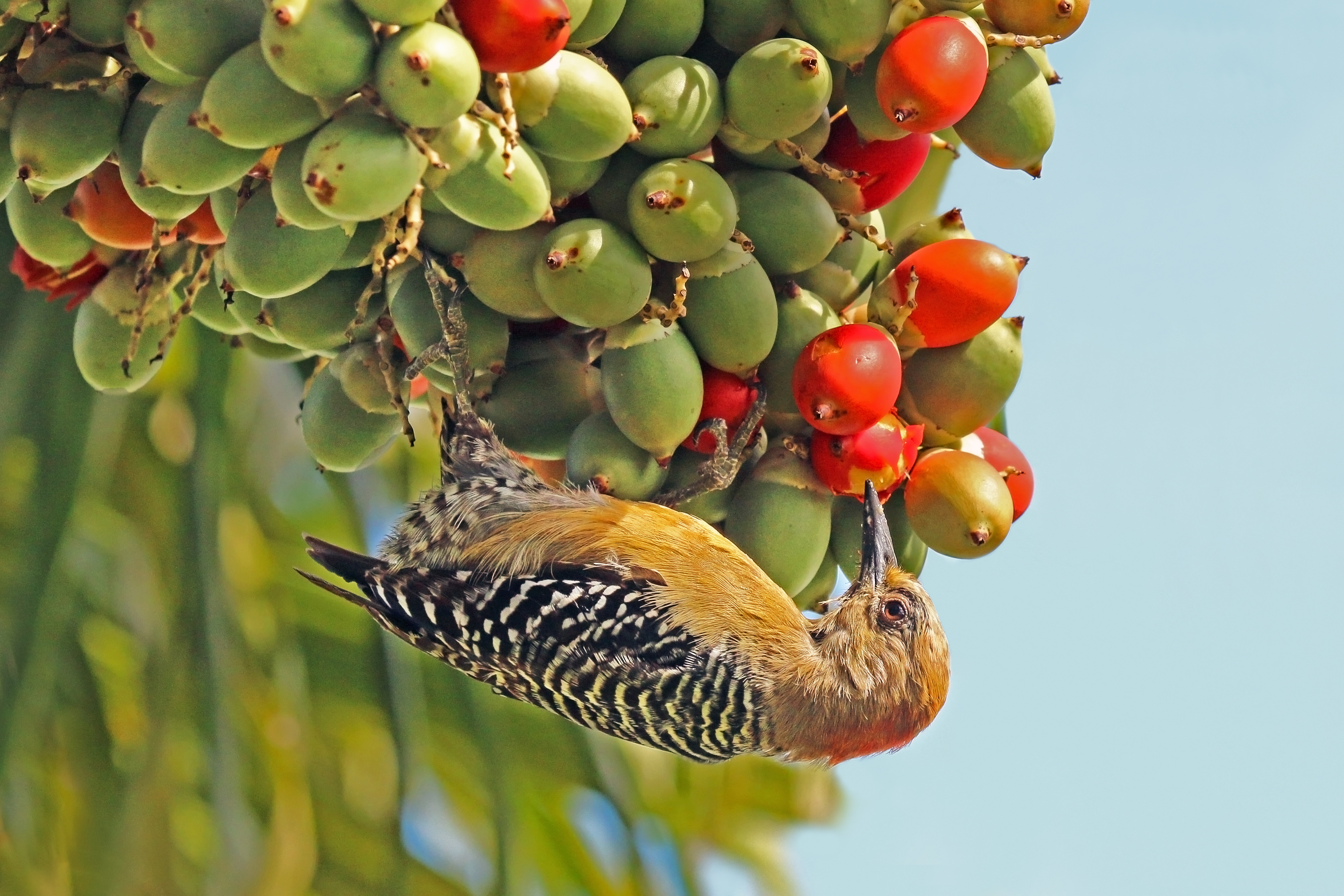
Female M. r. rubricapillus, Tobago

=== Feeding ===
The red-crowned woodpecker's diet includes a large amount of fruits and berries including cultivated ones like papayas and bananas. Another major portion is many types of insects and spiders, but fewer larvae of wood-boring beetles than many woodpeckers. It also takes nectar from flowers. The species forages at all levels of its habitat but favors the middle and lower strata. It is typically seen singly or in pairs. It feeds by probing, gleaning, and hammering for insects, and by reaching for fruit which it pierces or pecks open when too large to swallow whole. It will take fruit from feeders, and is "considered a nuisance locally in plantations and gardens because of its fruit-eating habits."

=== Breeding ===
The red-crowned woodpecker's breeding season varies geographically, spanning February to July in Costa Rica and Panama, May to June in Colombia, May to November in Venezuela, and March to July in Tobago. It sometimes raises two broods in a year. Pairs stay together year-round. Both sexes excavate the nest hole, typically in a large tree trunk or branch or a large cactus; fence posts are also used. Nests are usually between 3 and 23 m (10 and 75 ft) above the ground. The clutch size is three or four eggs but usually only two young fledge. Both parents incubate the eggs for the 10-day period. Fledging occurs 31 to 33 days after hatch and both parents care for the nestlings, and also for fledglings for at least a month.

=== Vocal and non-vocal sounds ===
The red-crowned woodpecker's typical call is "often wavering and protracted with an abrupt terminal note, e.g. 'churr, churr, krr-r-r-r'." It also makes a "'wícka, wícka' in display" and "chattering calls". Both sexes drum during the breeding season and also tap more softly near the nest hole.

== Status ==
The IUCN has assessed the red-crowned woodpecker as being of Least Concern. It has a large range and its estimated population of at least a half million mature individuals is believed to be stable. No immediate threats have been identified. It is considered common in most of its range and abundant in Costa Rica and Panama; it occurs in several protected areas. It might "benefit from forest clearance; numbers tend to increase in areas where thinning and clearance creates more open woodland."
