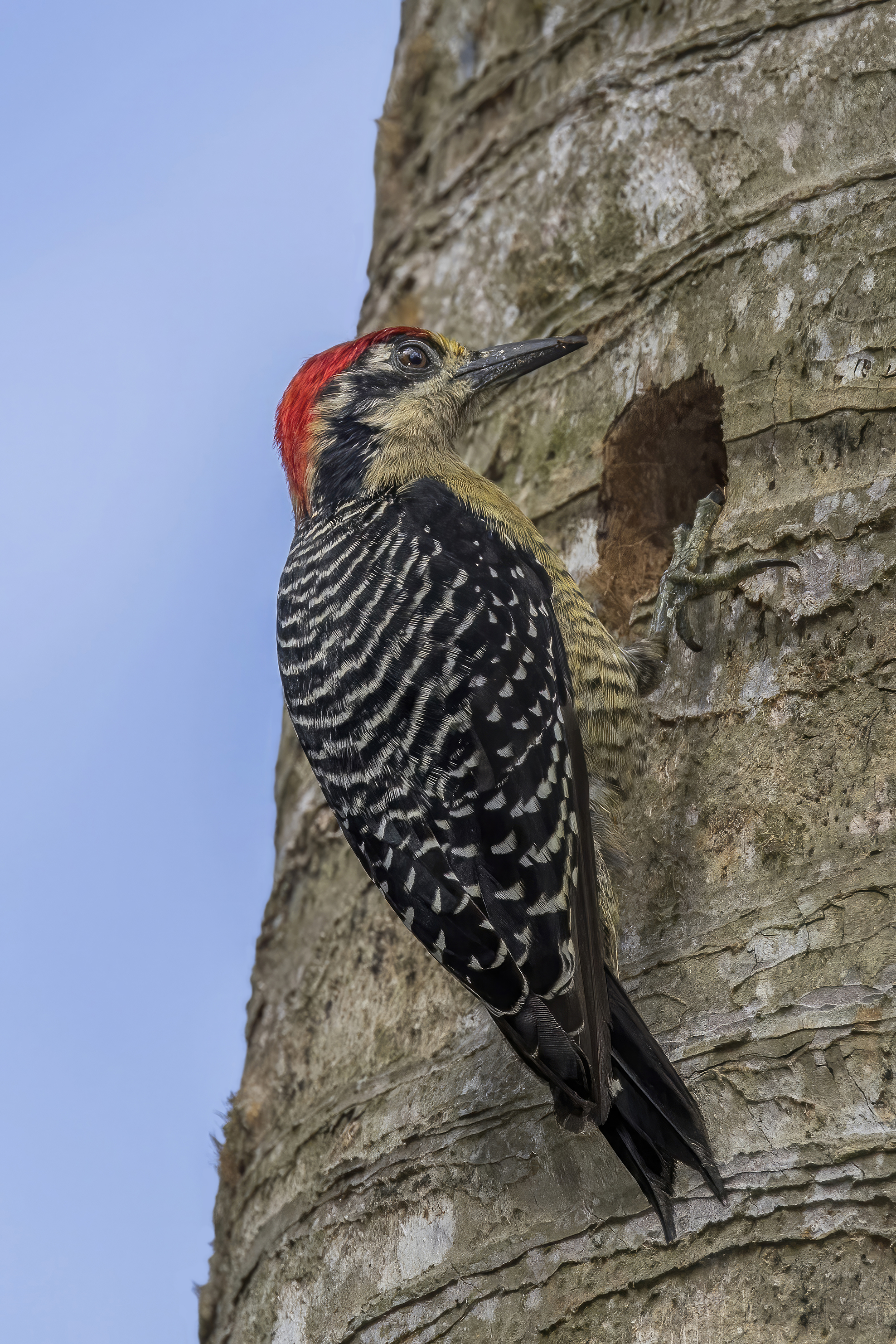
- male in Belize
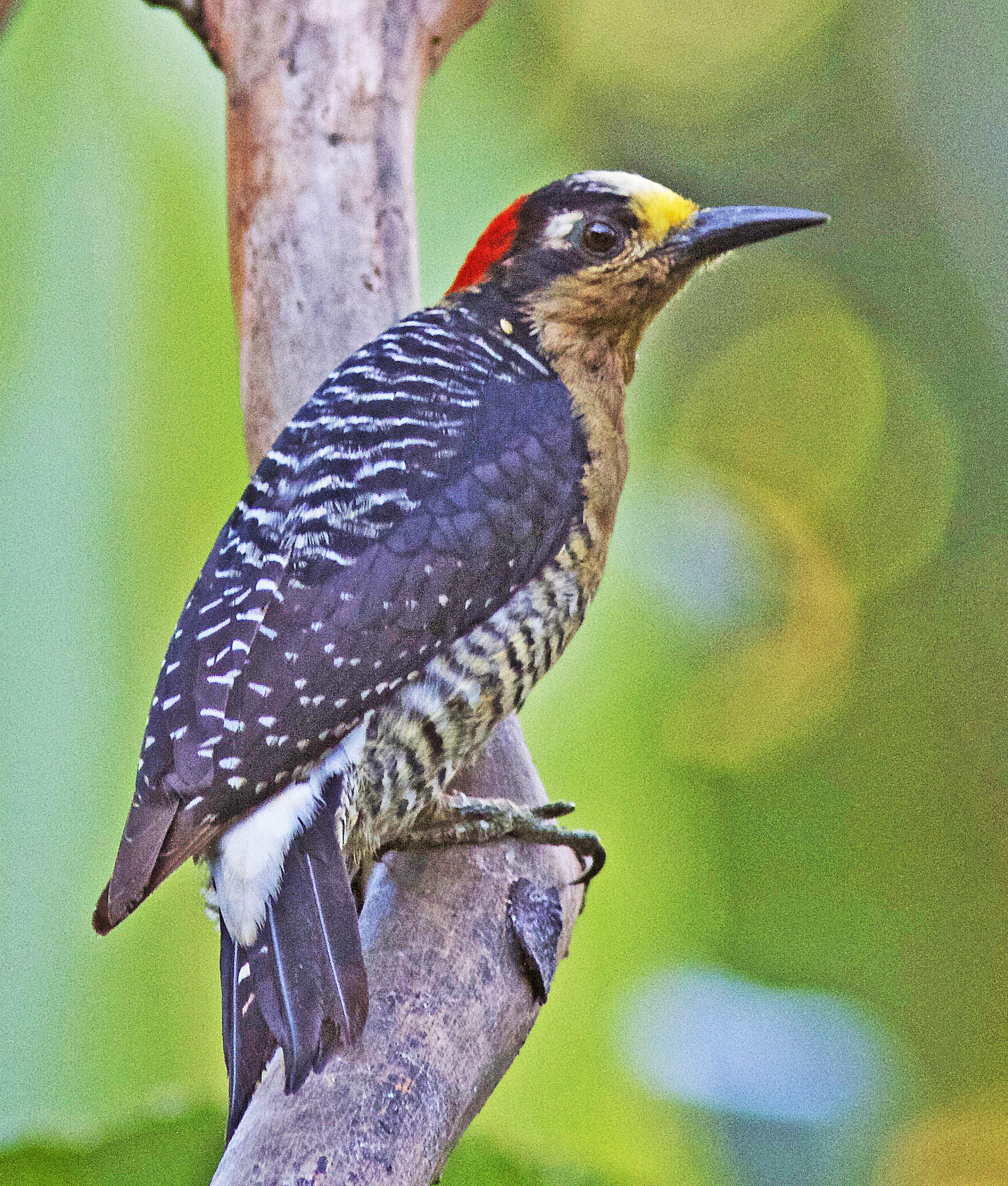
- female in Ecuador

Conservation status
- Least Concern (IUCN 3.1)

Scientific classification
- Kingdom: Animalia
- Phylum: Chordata
- Class: Aves
- Order: Piciformes
- Family: Picidae
- Genus: Melanerpes
- Species: M. pucherani

Binomial name
- Melanerpes pucherani (Malherbe, 1849)

= Black-cheeked woodpecker =

Species of bird

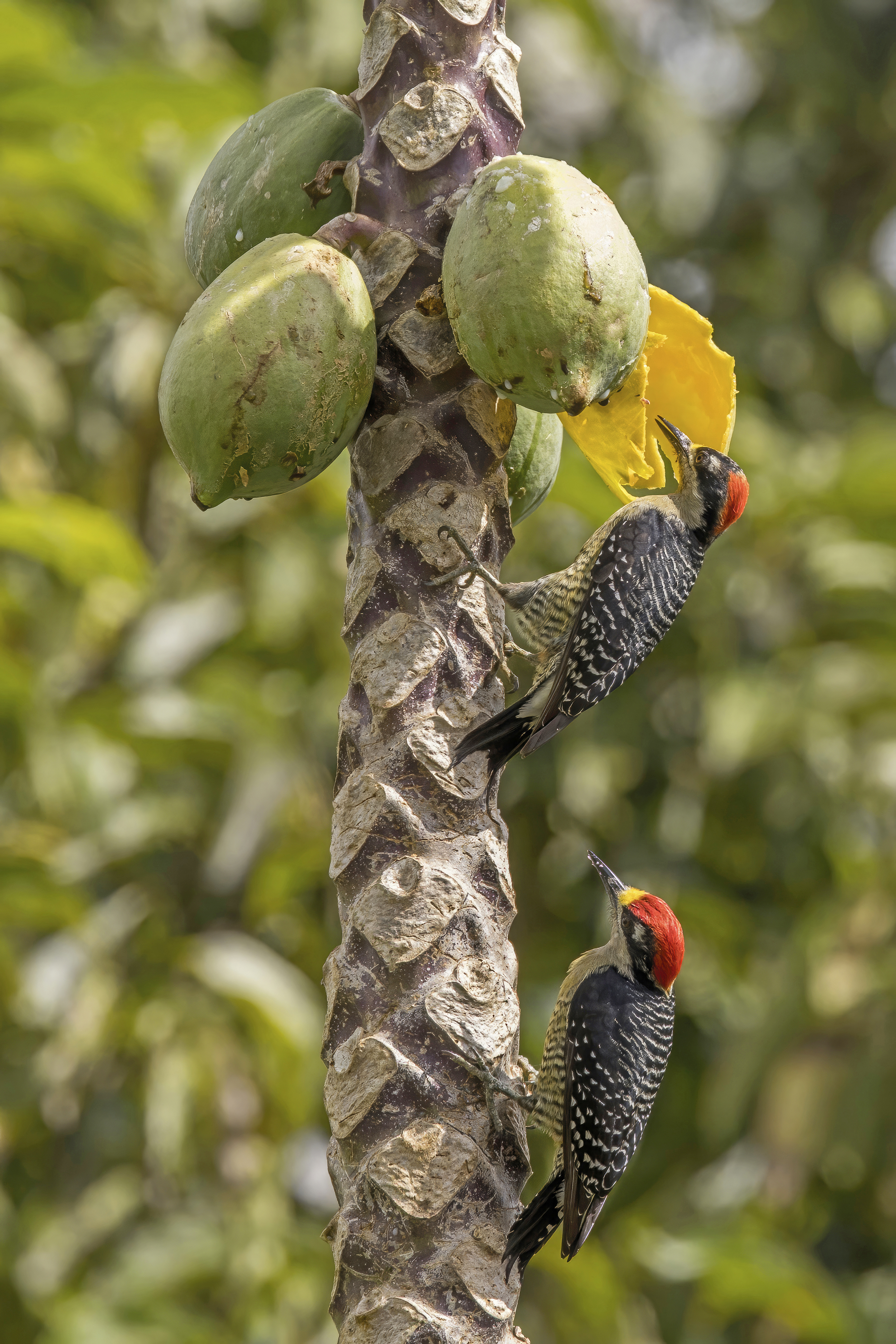
Female feeding on wild papaya with male below

The black-cheeked woodpecker (Melanerpes pucherani) is a species of bird in subfamily Picinae of the woodpecker family Picidae. It is found from Mexico south to Ecuador.

== Taxonomy and systematics ==
The black-cheeked woodpecker and several others were for a time placed in genus Tripsurus. It and the golden-naped woodpecker (M. chrysauchen) form a superspecies. The black-cheeked woodpecker is monotypic but assigning it two subspecies has sometimes been proposed.

The black-cheeked woodpecker's specific epithet commemorates the French zoologist Jacques Pucheran.

== Description ==
The black-cheeked woodpecker is 17 to 19 cm (6.7 to 7.5 in) long and weighs 42 to 68 g (1.5 to 2.4 oz). The sexes' plumage is alike except for their head pattern. Adult males have a golden yellow forehead and a red crown and nape. Adult females have a white to buffy white forehead, a black central crown, and a red hindcrown and nape. Both sexes have black around the eye that extends down the side of the neck and a white line behind the eye. Their upper back has black and white bars and their lower back and uppertail coverts are white with a pale buff tinge and sometimes some blackish bars. Their flight feathers are black or brownish black with narrow white tips and white bars throughout. Their tail is black with some white bars on the central pair of feathers. Their lores, cheeks, chin, and upper throat are whitish. Their lower throat and breast are olive-buff with a gray tinge and the rest of their underparts are buffish white with strong wavy bars and a red spot in the center of the belly; their undertail coverts are yellow-brown. Their bill is longish and black with a paler base to its mandible, their iris is brown, the bare skin around the eye brown to grayish, and the legs greenish gray to olive. Juveniles are duller and browner than adults, with more diffuse barring and a smaller and paler red spot on the belly. The male's nape is orangey red; females have much less red than adults on their crown.

== Distribution and habitat ==
The black-cheeked woodpecker is found from Veracruz and Chiapas in southern Mexico south on the Caribbean slope into Costa Rica and from there on both slopes in Panama through western Colombia and western Ecuador slightly into Peru.

The black-cheeked woodpecker inhabits the interior and edges of humid to wet evergreen forest, mature secondary forest and abandoned plantations, and clearings with scattered trees. It sometimes occurs in gardens, even those far from forest. In elevation it is mostly found between 700 and 900 m (2,300 and 3,000 ft) but occasionally occurs up to 1,200 m (3,900 ft) and, in Ecuador, locally as high as 1,500 m (4,900 ft).

== Behavior ==
=== Movement ===
The black-cheeked woodpecker is a year-round resident throughout its range.

=== Feeding ===
The black-cheeked woodpecker feeds on a very wide variety of arthropods including spiders, beetles, ants, and aerial insects. It also eats much plant material such as fruits, berries, seeds, and catkins, and takes nectar from large flowers in trees. It typically forages singly or in pairs though groups sometimes gather at trees with fruit. It also joins mixed species foraging flocks. It usually forages from the forest's midlevel to the crown, probing, pecking, gleaning, and hawking. It is very active and agile, sometimes clinging to the underside of branches.

=== Breeding ===
The black-cheeked woodpecker's breeding season is from March to July. It excavates a nest hole in a dead trunk or branch, typically between 4 and 30 m (15 and 100 ft) above the ground. Both sexes incubate the clutch of two to four eggs. The incubation period is 14 days and fledging occurs about three weeks after hatch.

=== Vocal and non-vocal sounds ===
The black-cheeked woodpecker's most common call is "a series of c. 4 short rattling trills on same pitch, 'churrr, churrr, churrr, churrr' or 'cherrr'." It also makes a "longer smoother rattle", a "loud full-toned 'krrrr'", and a "higher-pitched piercing 'chirriree' or 'keereereek'." Both sexes drum, but not frequently.

== Status ==
The IUCN has assessed the black-cheeked woodpecker as being of Least Concern. It has a very large range and an estimated population of at least 50,000 mature individuals, though the latter is believed to be decreasing. No immediate threats have been identified. It occurs in several protected areas, but "[n]umbers decline with extensive deforestation."
