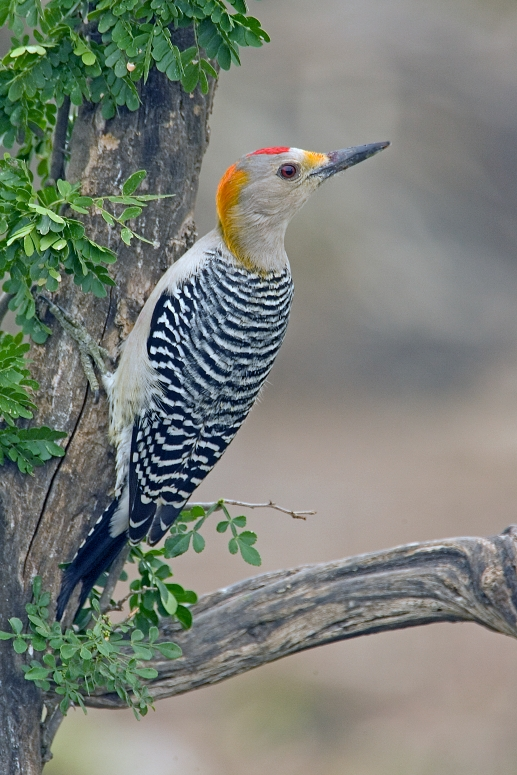
- A male from the northern subspecies group at Roma, Texas
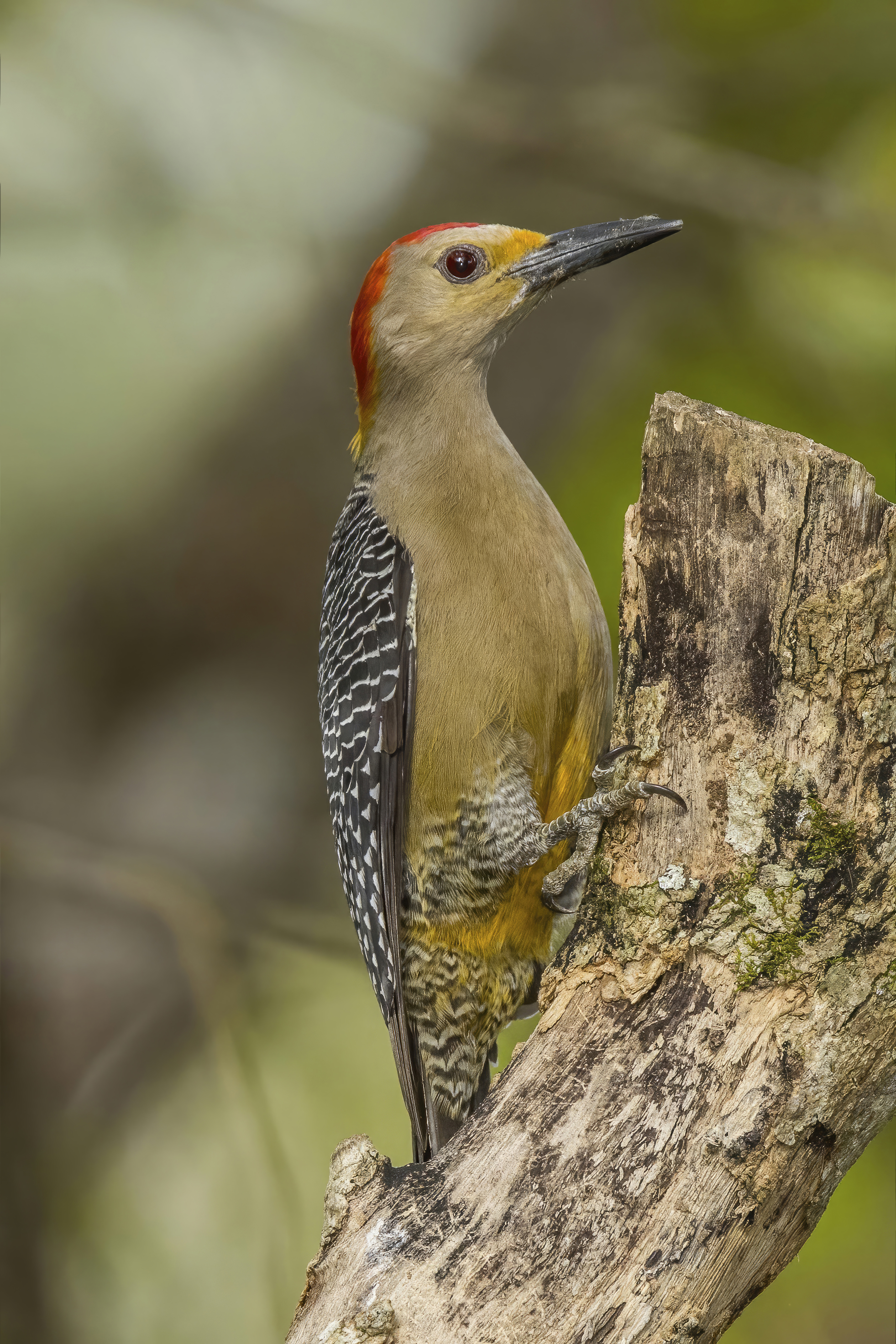
- Velasquez's woodpecker from Honduras

Conservation status
- Least Concern (IUCN 3.1)

Scientific classification
- Kingdom: Animalia
- Phylum: Chordata
- Class: Aves
- Order: Piciformes
- Family: Picidae
- Genus: Melanerpes
- Species: M. aurifrons

Binomial name
- Melanerpes aurifrons (Wagler, 1829)
- Range

= Golden-fronted woodpecker =

Species of bird

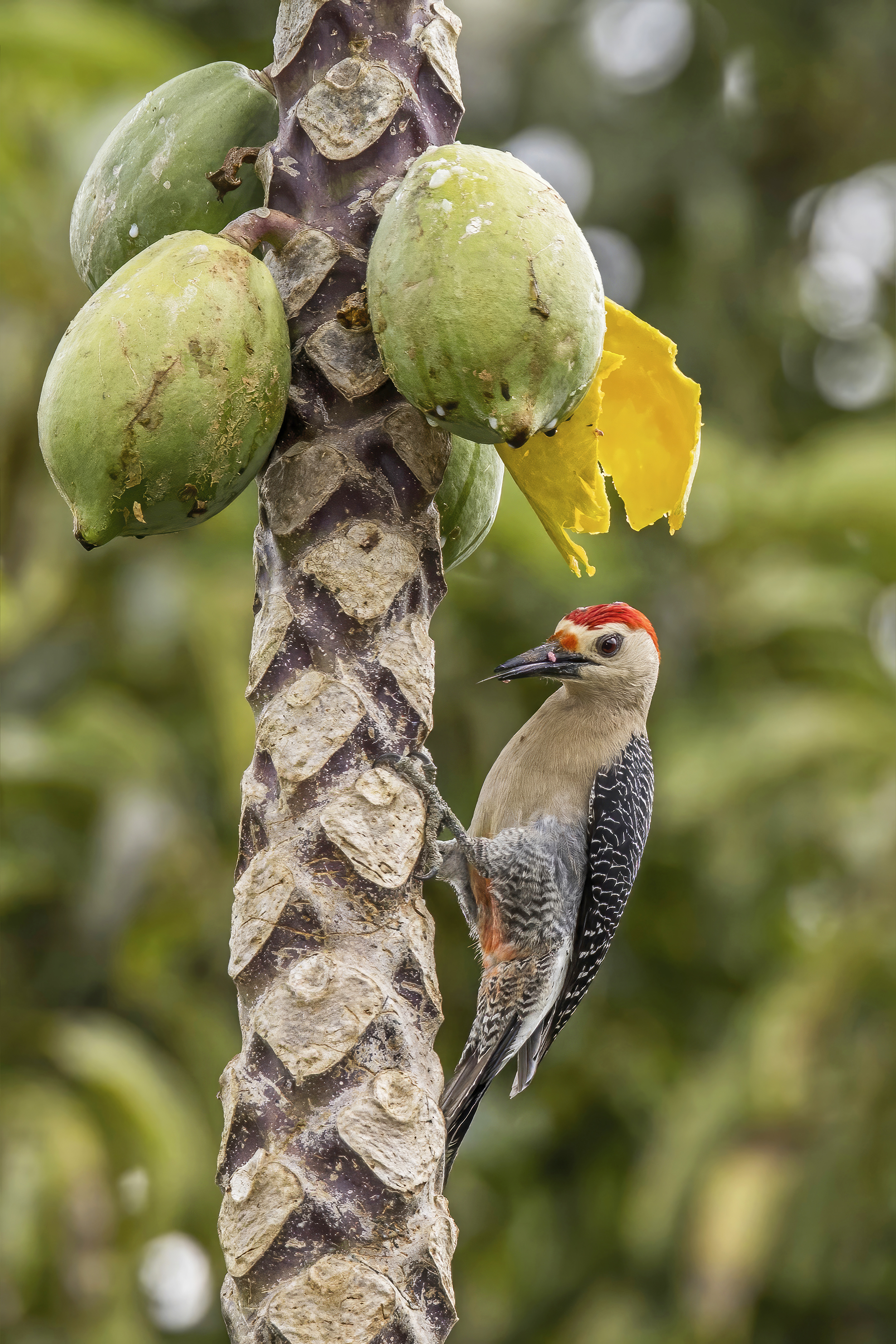
Velasquez's woodpecker male on wild papaya

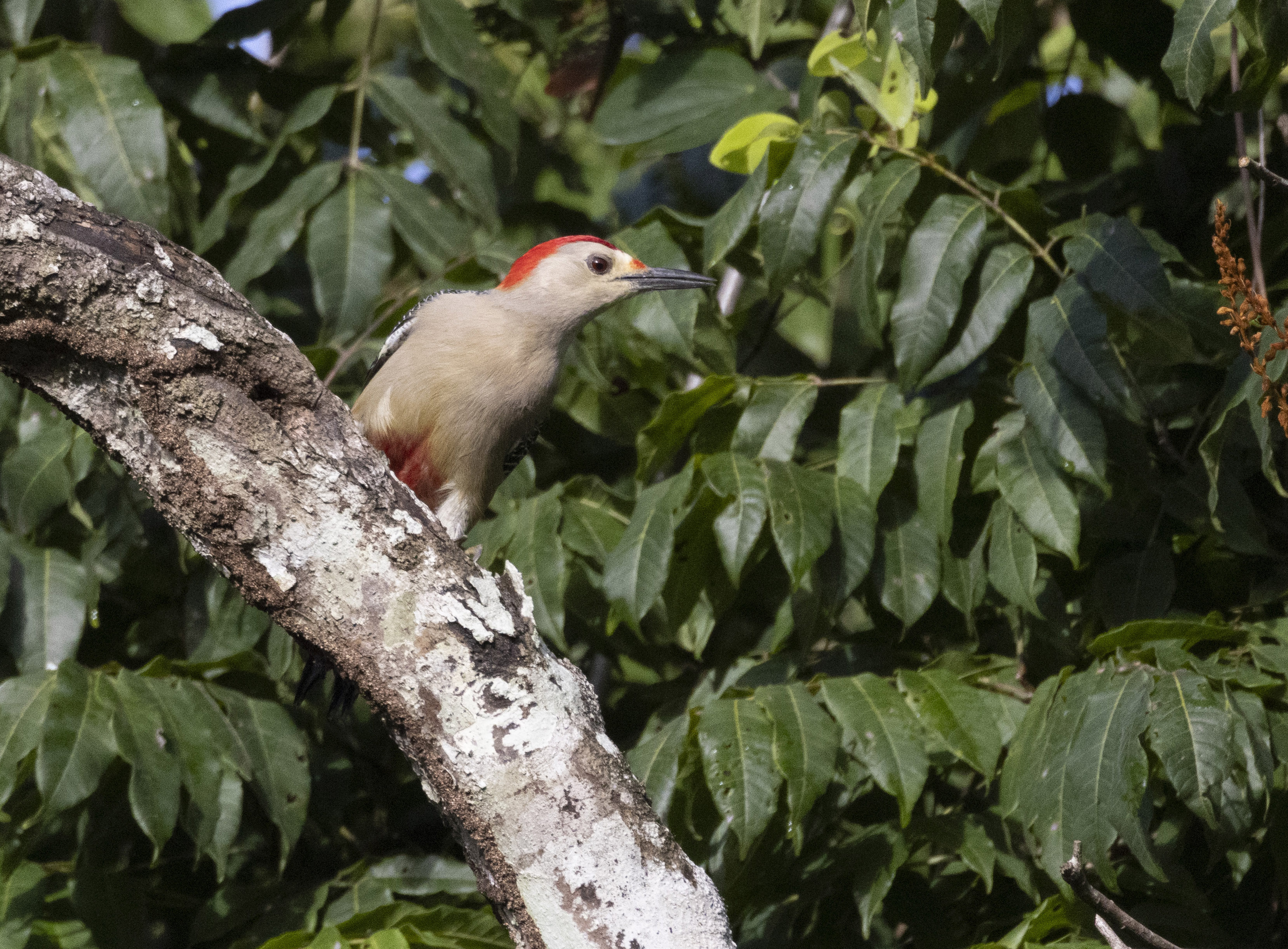
Golden-fronted woodpecker, race polygrammus, Belize

The golden-fronted woodpecker (Melanerpes aurifrons) is a species of bird in subfamily Picinae of the woodpecker family Picidae. It is found in the southern United States (mostly Texas), Mexico and parts of Central America.

== Taxonomy and systematics ==
The golden-fronted woodpecker was formally described in 1829 by the German naturalist Johann Georg Wagler under the binomial name Picus aurifrons. The specific epithet combines the Latin aurum, auri meaning "gold" with frons, frontis meaning "forehead", "brow" or "front". The type locality is the state of Hidalgo in south central Mexico. The golden-fronted woodpecker is now one of the 23 species placed in the genus Melanerpes that was introduced by the English ornithologist William Swainson in 1832.

Twelve subspecies are recognised, many of which are restricted to islands.

- M. a. aurifrons (Wagler, 1829) – central south USA to central south Mexico
- M. a. polygrammus (Cabanis, 1862) – Oaxaca to Chiapas (southwest Mexico)
- M. a. grateloupensis (Lesson, RP, 1839) – south Tamaulipas to Puebla and central Veracruz (east Mexico)
- M. a. veraecrucis Nelson, 1900 – south Veracruz (east Mexico) to north Guatemala
- M. a. dubius (Cabot, S, 1844) – Yucatán Peninsula (southeast Mexico) to Belize and northeast Guatemala
- M. a. leei (Ridgway, 1885) – Cozumel (just east of Mexico)
- M. a. turneffensis (Russell, 1963) – Turneffe Atoll (off Belize)
- M. a. santacruzi (Bonaparte, 1838) – south Chiapas (south Mexico) to north Nicaragua
- M. a. hughlandi Dickerman, 1987 – central Guatemala
- M. a. pauper (Ridgway, 1888) – north Honduras
- M. a. insulanus (Bond, J, 1936) – Utila (Bay Islands, off north Honduras)
- M. a. canescens (Salvin, 1889) – islands of Roatán and Barburat Island (off Honduras)

All the subspecies in the above list, except for the nominate have sometimes been considered as a separate species, Velasquez's woodpecker (Melanerpes santacruzi).

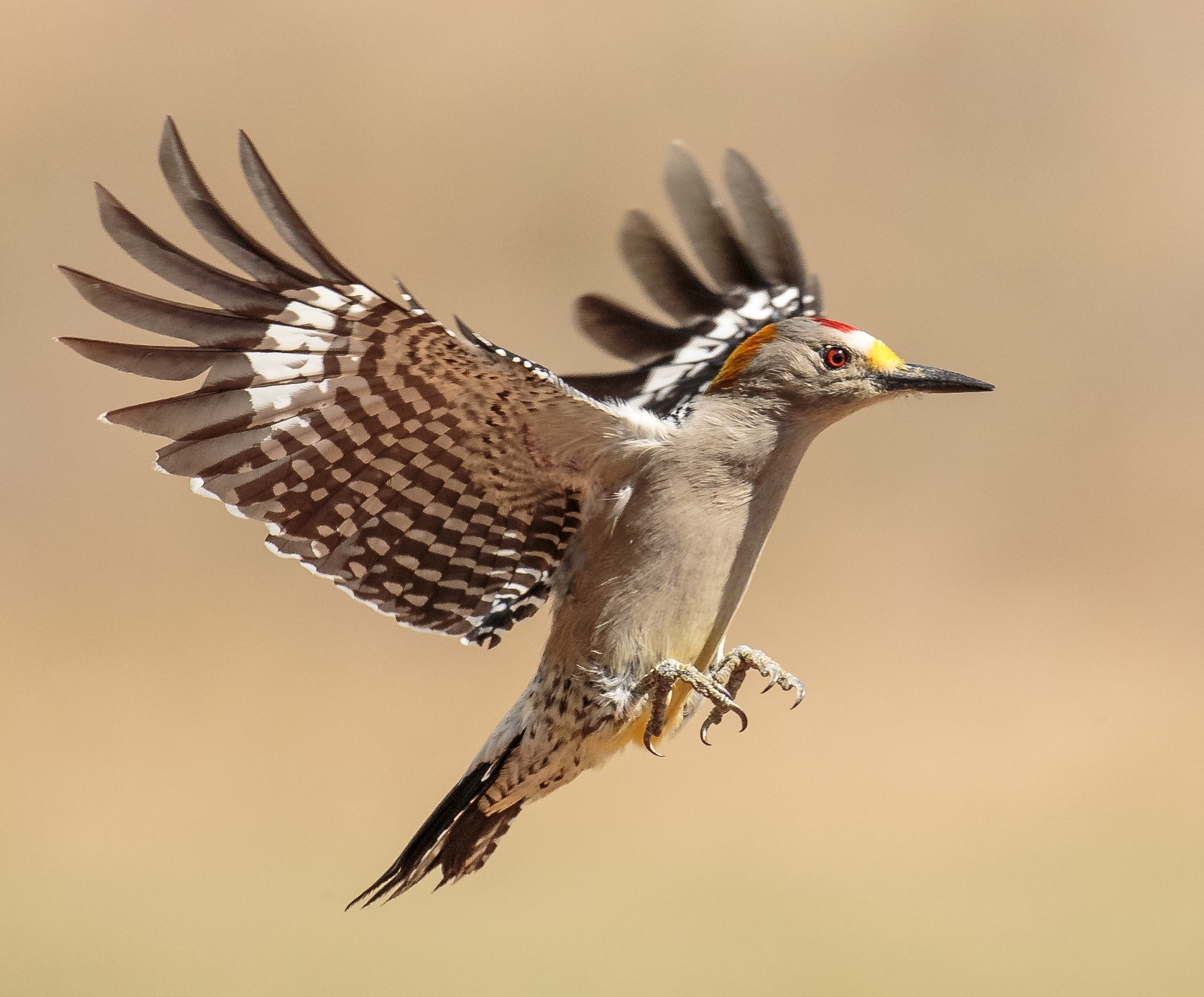
Male in flight, Texas

== Description ==
The golden-fronted woodpecker is 22 to 26 cm (8.7 to 10 in) long and weighs 65 to 102 g (2.3 to 3.6 oz). Males and females have the same plumage except for the pattern on their heads. Adult males have a red crown and a golden orange to yellow nape with a gap between them; females have a grayish crown and a paler yellow nape. On adults of both sexes the rest of the head is various shades of gray. Their upperparts are mostly barred black and white, with white uppertail coverts that have a few black spots. Their flight feathers are black with variable amounts of white on the primaries. Their tail is mostly black with variable amounts of white on the outermost three pairs of feathers. Their underparts are smoke gray to drab gray with light blackish bars on the flanks and undertail coverts and a yellow patch on the belly. Their iris is deep red to reddish brown, their bill is black to grayish black, and their legs and feet are grayish green to greenish gray. Juveniles are duller overall than adults, with little or no orange on the nape, indistinct barring on the upperparts, and fine dusky streaks on the underparts. Males have a small red crown patch and females just a few red feathers there.

== Distribution and habitat ==
The golden-fronted woodpecker is found from southwestern Oklahoma through central Texas onto the Mexican Plateau as far as Jalisco, San Luis Potosí, and Hidalgo. It is a casual visitor to New Mexico and East Texas, and has been recorded once each in Michigan and Florida. It inhabits both mesic and xeric landscapes. It favors the latter, which include mesquite brushlands and riparian woodlands. It also frequents urban parks and suburban areas.

== Behavior ==
=== Movement ===
The golden-fronted woodpecker is a year-round resident throughout its range.

=== Feeding ===
The golden-fronted woodpecker's diet is adult and larval arthropods, some aerial insects, much fruit and nuts, and corn. It has been observed predating other birds' eggs. The species forages mainly in trees, especially on major limbs and typically below 6 m (20 ft). It also forages on open or grassy ground but seldom under brush. It takes its food by gleaning, pecking, probing, and least frequently by aerial flycatching.

=== Breeding ===
The golden-fronted woodpecker usually remains paired year-round, and is territorial even outside the nesting season. In Texas it breeds between March and July, and often produces two broods per year. Both sexes excavate the nest cavity in the trunk or limb of a tree, both live and dead. It also sometimes uses utility poles, fence posts, and nest boxes. The cavity is usually between 2 and 9 m (7 and 30 ft) above the ground. Most clutches are of four or five eggs, and both sexes incubate. The incubation period is 12 to 14 days and fledging occurs about 30 days after hatch.

=== Vocal and non-vocal sounds ===
The golden-fronted woodpecker's call is "a loud harsh kirrr or a hard tig tig" that is often repeated in a series. Its drumming is "short and relatively slow".

== Status ==
The IUCN follows HBW taxonomy and so has not assessed the golden-fronted woodpecker separately from Velasquez's woodpecker. The golden-fronted woodpecker sensu lato is considered to be of Least Concern, with a stable population. It is considered common in much of Texas; population data from Mexico is sparse. It "appears to adjust well to human-altered environments, occupying parks and urban areas."
