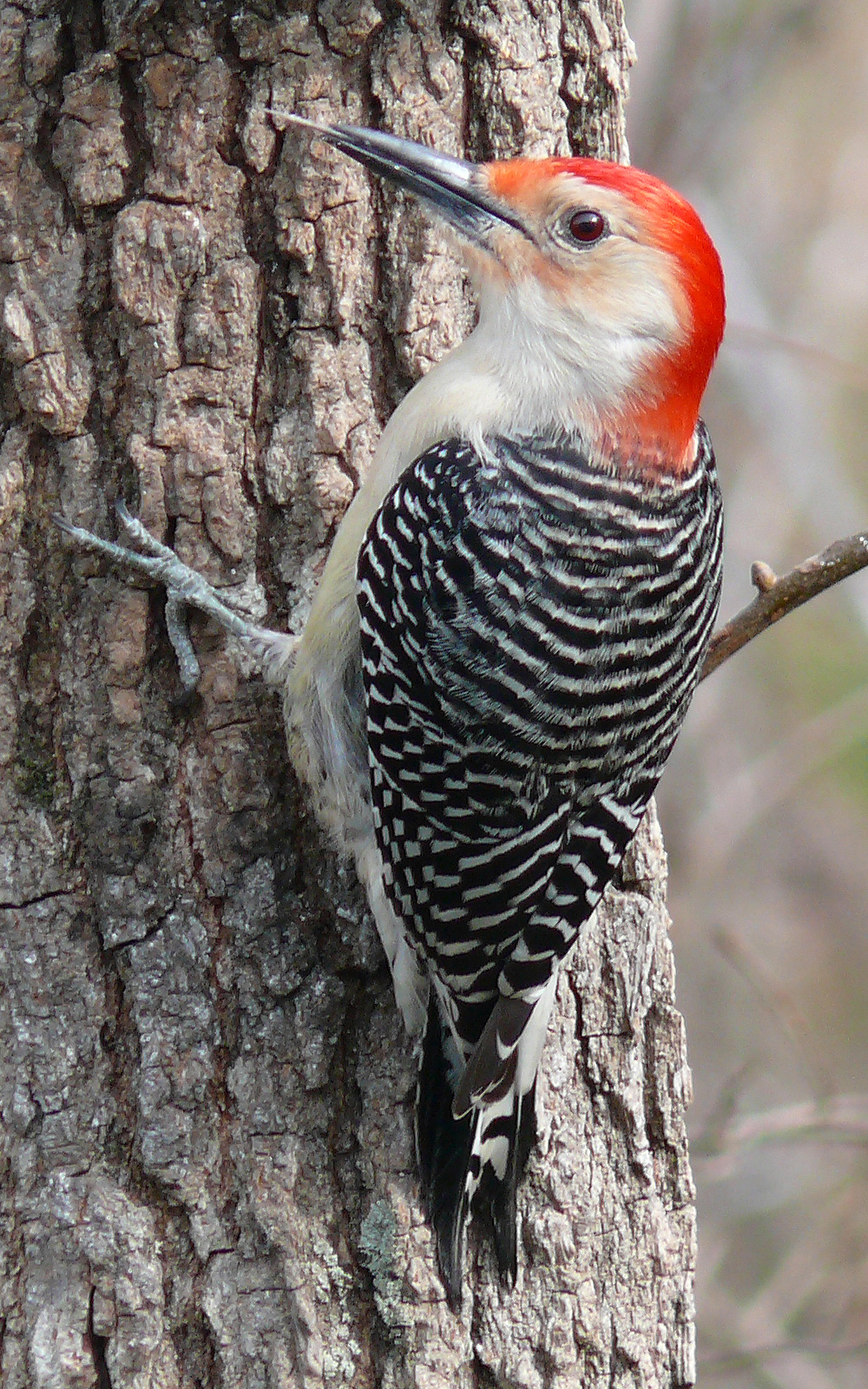
- Red-bellied woodpecker (Melanerpes carolinus)

Scientific classification
- Kingdom: Animalia
- Phylum: Chordata
- Class: Aves
- Order: Piciformes
- Family: Picidae
- Tribe: Melanerpini
- Genus: Melanerpes; Swainson, 1832

Type species
- Picus erythrocephalus Linnaeus, 1758

Species
- See text

= Melanerpes =

Genus of birds

Melanerpes is a genus of woodpeckers of the family Picidae found in the Americas. The 23 members of the genus are mostly colourful birds, conspicuously barred in black and white, with some red and yellow.

== Taxonomy ==
The genus Melanerpes was introduced by English ornithologist William Swainson in 1832 to accommodate the red-headed woodpecker (Melanerpes erythrocephalus). The generic name combines the Ancient Greek melas meaning "black" with herpēs meaning "creeper". The genus forms part of the large tribe Melanerpini, which also includes the North American sapsuckers in the genus Sphyrapicus and the monotypic genus Xiphidiopicus containing only the Cuban green woodpecker (X. percussus).

== Characteristics ==
Members of Melanerpes are small to medium-sized woodpeckers found exclusively in the New World. Some are West Indian endemics, and include species from Hispaniola, Puerto Rico, Jamaica, and Guadeloupe; one subspecies, the Grand Bahama West Indian woodpecker (M. superciliaris bahamensis) became extinct in the 1950s. Most of the species are from Central and South America. Most species are boldly marked in black and white, with some areas of red and yellow. Their beaks are long and pointed and sometimes curved. The sexes differ in many species, both in colour and size.

Some species, such as the acorn woodpecker and the yellow-tufted woodpecker, are sociable, foraging in groups, communicating vocally, and nesting communally. These have complex breeding systems including some nonbreeding adult helpers assisting in rearing the young. Like other woodpeckers, insects form a large part of the diet, being caught on the wing in some species, but fruit is also eaten in large quantities, and some species consume sap. They all nest in holes that they excavate in trees, and the red-crowned woodpecker and Hoffmann's woodpecker are unusual in that they sometimes enter their holes backwards.

== Species ==
The genus includes 23 species:

Image	Common name	Scientific name	Distribution
	White woodpecker	Melanerpes candidus	Suriname, French Guiana, Brazil, Bolivia, Paraguay, Uruguay and Argentina.
	Lewis's woodpecker	Melanerpes lewis	western and central United States
	Guadeloupe woodpecker	Melanerpes herminieri	Guadeloupe archipelago
	Puerto Rican woodpecker	Melanerpes portoricensis	Puerto Rico
	Red-headed woodpecker	Melanerpes erythrocephalus	southern Canada and the east-central United States.
	Acorn woodpecker	Melanerpes formicivorus	Oregon, California, and the southwestern United States, south through Central America to Colombia.
	Yellow-tufted woodpecker	Melanerpes cruentatus	Bolivia, Brazil, Colombia, Ecuador, French Guiana, Guyana, Peru, Suriname, and Venezuela.
	Yellow-fronted woodpecker	Melanerpes flavifrons	Brazil, Paraguay and far northeastern Argentina.
	Golden-naped woodpecker	Melanerpes chrysauchen	Costa Rica and western Panama
	Beautiful woodpecker	Melanerpes pulcher	Colombia.
	Black-cheeked woodpecker	Melanerpes pucherani	southeastern Mexico south to western Ecuador.
	White-fronted woodpecker	Melanerpes cactorum	Bolivia, Paraguay and Argentina.
	Hispaniolan woodpecker	Melanerpes striatus	Hispaniola (Haiti and the Dominican Republic)
	Jamaican woodpecker	Melanerpes radiolatus	Jamaica.
	Golden-cheeked woodpecker	Melanerpes chrysogenys	Mexico
	Grey-breasted woodpecker	Melanerpes hypopolius	southwestern Mexico.
	Yucatan woodpecker	Melanerpes pygmaeus	Belize and Mexico
	Red-crowned woodpecker	Melanerpes rubricapillus	Costa Rica, Panama, Colombia, Venezuela, the Guianas and Tobago.
	Gila woodpecker	Melanerpes uropygialis	southwestern United States and western Mexico.
	Hoffmann's woodpecker	Melanerpes hoffmannii	southern Honduras south to Costa Rica
	Golden-fronted woodpecker	Melanerpes aurifrons	Texas and Oklahoma in the United States through Mexico, Belize, Guatemala, El Salvador, Honduras and northern Nicaragua.
	Red-bellied woodpecker	Melanerpes carolinus	eastern United States
	West Indian woodpecker	Melanerpes superciliaris	Bahamas, the Cayman Islands and Cuba.

- †Melanerpes shawi (extinct: Late Pleistocene)
