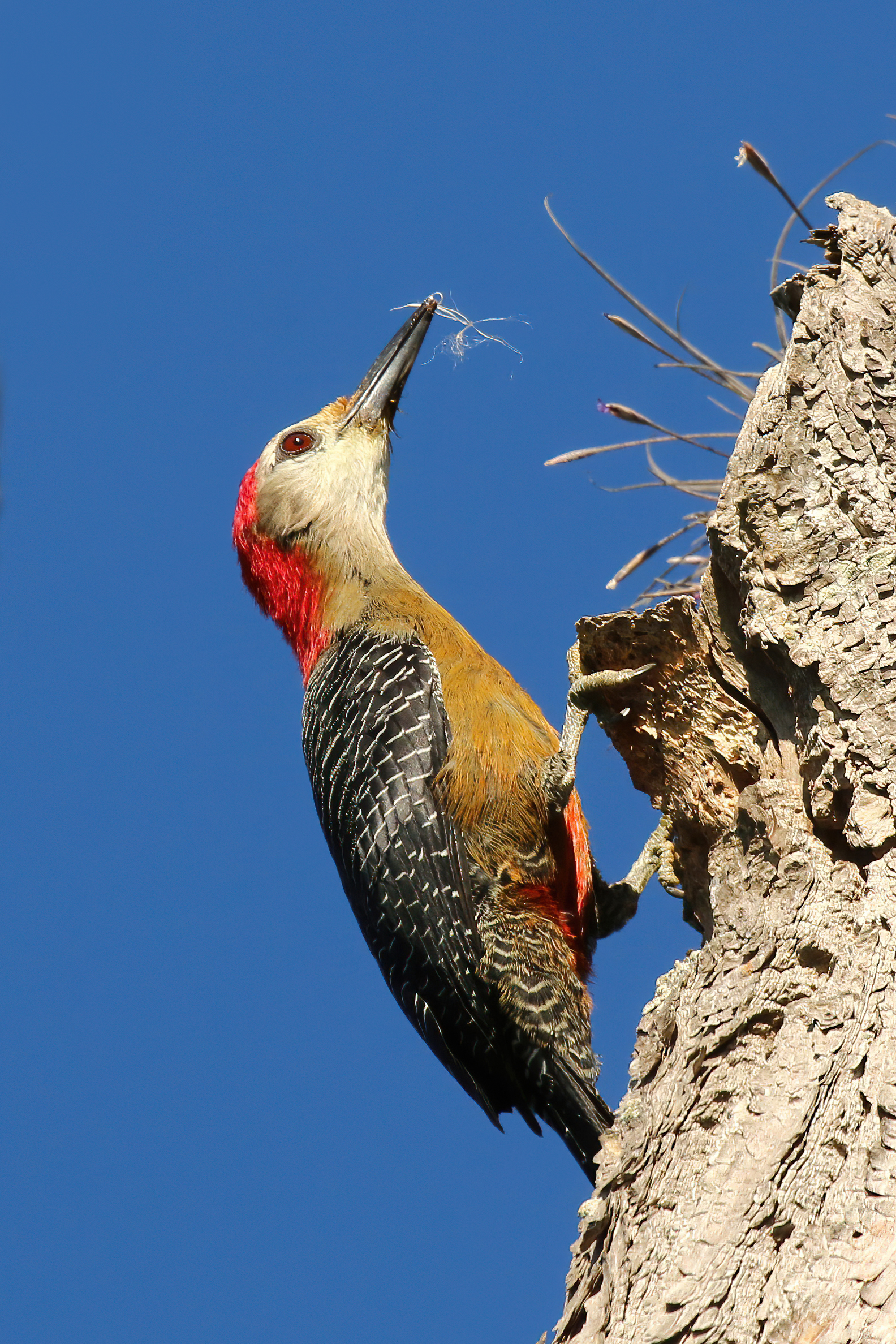
- male, Strawberry Hill, Jamaica

Conservation status
- Least Concern (IUCN 3.1)

Scientific classification
- Kingdom: Animalia
- Phylum: Chordata
- Class: Aves
- Order: Piciformes
- Family: Picidae
- Genus: Melanerpes
- Species: M. radiolatus

Binomial name
- Melanerpes radiolatus (Wagler, 1827)

= Jamaican woodpecker =

Species of bird

The Jamaican woodpecker (Melanerpes radiolatus) is a species of bird in subfamily Picinae of the woodpecker family Picidae. It is endemic to Jamaica.

== Taxonomy and systematics ==
The Jamaican woodpecker has sometimes been placed in genus Centurus. It is monotypic.

== Description ==
The Jamaican woodpecker is about 24 to 26 cm (9.4 to 10 in) long and weighs 92 to 131 g (3.2 to 4.6 oz). The sexes' plumage is alike except for their head pattern. Adult males have a whitish to buff forehead and are red from their forecrown to hindneck. Adult females have the same white to buffy white forehead but a gray crown with red only on the hindcrown and hindneck. Their upperparts are black with thin white bars that sometimes have a greenish tinge. The bars are widest on the rump and uppertail coverts. Their flight feathers are black with narrow white bars throughout. Their tail is black with some white bars on the central pair of feathers and white spots on the outermost pair. Their lores are yellowish and their cheeks, chin, and throat are white. Their underparts are mostly olive-gray to olive-buff with yellowish to reddish on the central belly; their lower flanks and undertail coverts are black with white bars. Their bill is long and black, their iris is red, the bare skin around the eye gray to brown, and the legs slaty black. Juveniles are duller than adults, with grayer underparts but a yellower central belly. Their eyes are brown and both sexes have red on their crown but females less than males.

== Distribution and habitat ==
The Jamaican woodpecker is found throughout the island nation of Jamaica. It inhabits a variety of wooded landscapes including lower montane rainforest, wet and misty forests, mangroves, wooded pastures, citrus and coconut plantations, and gardens. It reaches its highest density in mesophytic secondary forest. In elevation it ranges from sea level to the highest mountains on the island.

== Behavior ==
=== Movement ===
The Jamaican woodpecker is a year-round resident throughout its range.

=== Feeding ===
The Jamaican woodpecker's diet is approximately half animal and half vegetable. Animal prey is mostly insects of many types but includes snails and occasionally lizards. Vegetable food is mostly fruits, especially those of Cecropia and Ficus. The species typically forages near the forest crown but will also hunt lower and in the canopy itself. It forages on trees, especially in bromeliads, and rarely hunts on large trunks. It collects food by snatching fruit and probing, pecking, gleaning, and hawking for insects.

=== Breeding ===
The Jamaican woodpecker's breeding season generally spans from December to August but nesting can occur in any month; pairs often produce two and sometimes three broods in a year. Males do most of the excavation of the nest hole; it is in a dead branch, a dead trunk, or a utility pole and is usually between 5 and 15 m (15 and 50 ft) above the ground. The clutch size is three to five eggs and both sexes incubate the eggs. The incubation period is 13 days and fledging occurs about a month after hatch. Both sexes provision the young as nestlings and for as long as a month after fledging.

=== Vocal and non-vocal sounds ===
The Jamaican woodpecker's most common vocalization is "a loud 'kaaa', sometimes repeated 2 or 3 times". Others are "single 'kao' calls in mild alarm", "'wee-cha weecha' in intraspecific encounters", and "'krirr, krirr' and more intimate 'whirr-whirr' during breeding season." Both sexes drum loudly and also tap more softly near the nest hole.

== Status ==
The IUCN has assessed the Jamaican woodpecker as being of Least Concern. It has a very large range but its population size is not known and is believed to be decreasing. No immediate threats have been identified. It is considered very common throughout the island. However, "although many forest areas are protected, enforcement of laws is often non-existent."
