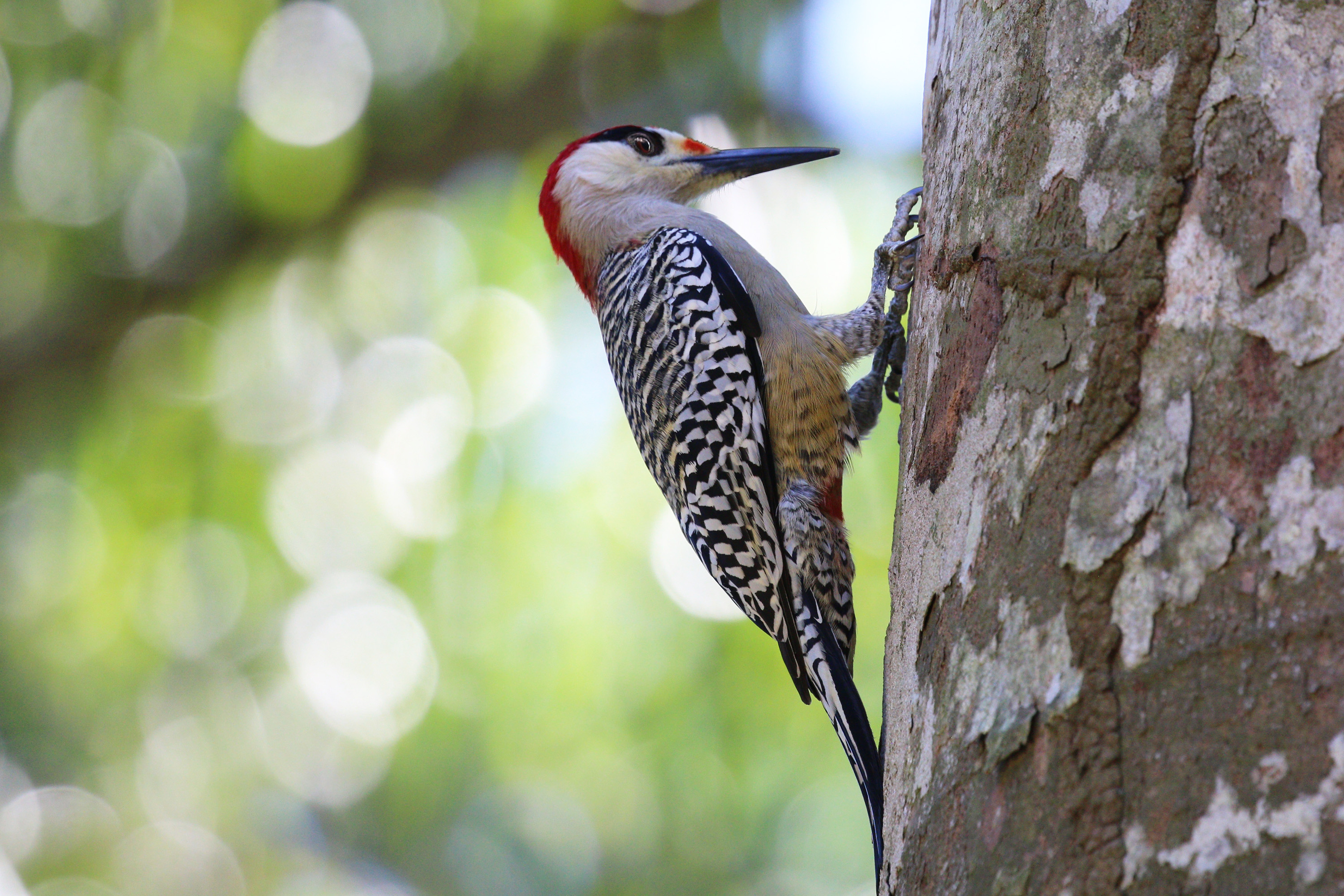
- Male
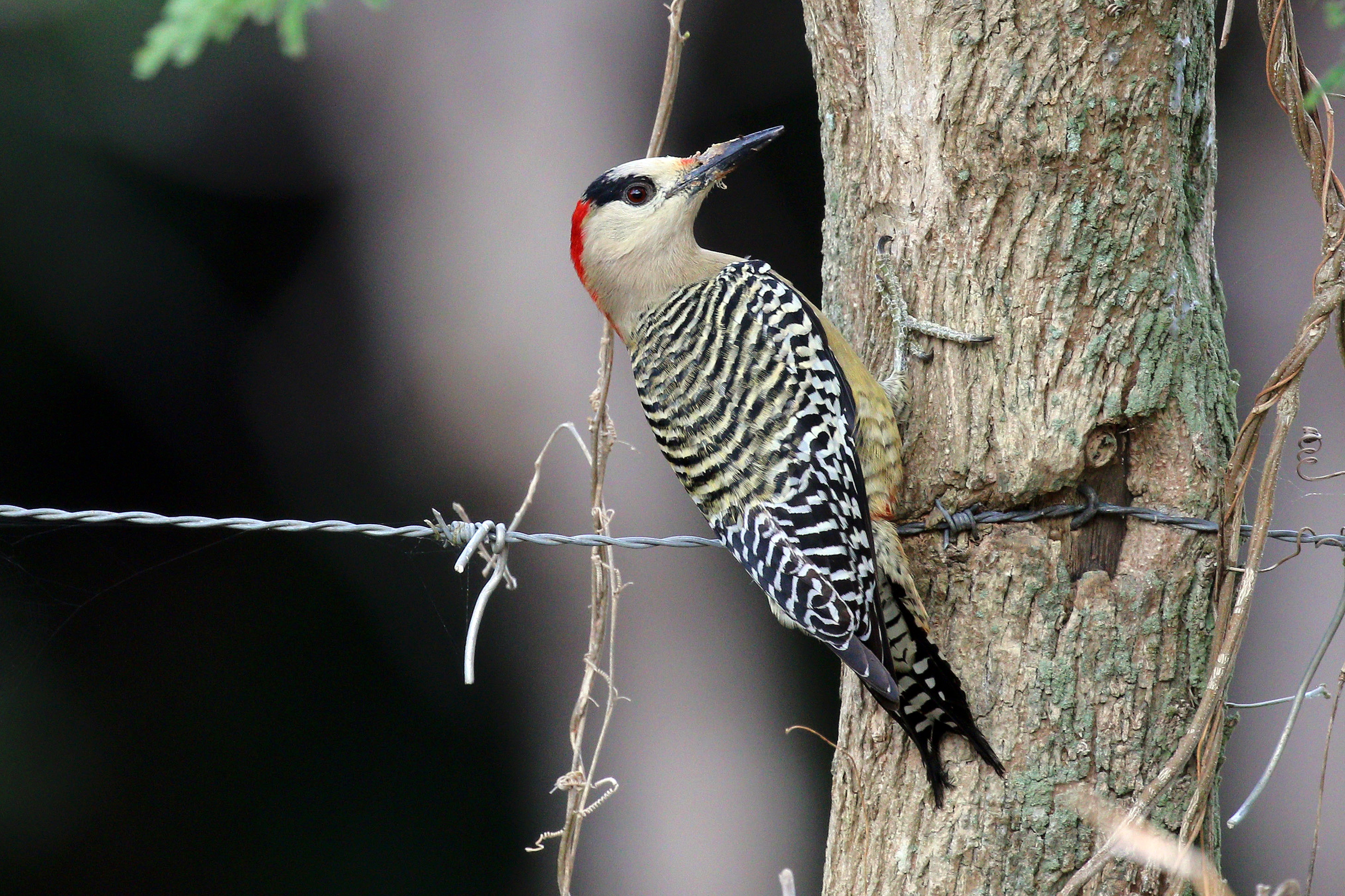
- Female; Both M. s. superciliaris on Cuba

Conservation status
- Least Concern (IUCN 3.1)

Scientific classification
- Kingdom: Animalia
- Phylum: Chordata
- Class: Aves
- Order: Piciformes
- Family: Picidae
- Genus: Melanerpes
- Species: M. superciliaris

Binomial name
- Melanerpes superciliaris (Temminck, 1827)

= West Indian woodpecker =

Species of bird

The West Indian woodpecker (Melanerpes superciliaris) is a species of bird in subfamily Picinae of the woodpecker family Picidae. It is found in the Bahamas, the Cayman Islands and Cuba.

== Taxonomy and systematics ==
The West Indian woodpecker was originally described as Picus superciliaris and has also been assigned to genus Centurus. Major taxonomic systems assign these five subspecies to the West Indian woodpecker:

- M. s. nyeanus (Ridgway, 1886)
- M. s. blakei (Ridgway, 1886)
- M. s. superciliaris (Temminck, 1827)
- M. s. murceus (Bangs, 1910)
- M. s. caymanensis (Cory, 1886)

Populations on two small Cuban islands have been treated as additional subspecies M. s. florentinoi and M. s. sanfelipensis. The treatment was based on only a few specimens, and those populations are possibly extinct. The population on Grand Bahama Island was also sometimes treated as subspecies M. s. bahamensis; it is apparently extinct. None of these subspecies have gained wide acceptance.

== Description ==
The West Indian woodpecker is about 27 to 32 cm (11 to 13 in) long and weighs 48 to 126 g (1.7 to 4.4 oz). Individuals on large islands are larger than those on small islands, and males are generally heavier and slightly larger than females. Males and females have the same plumage except for the pattern on their heads. Adult males of the nominate subspecies M. s. superciliaris have a red crown, nape, and hindneck and a black supercilium that extends to the red. Adult females have a whitish crown and the black supercilium entends around to separate the crown from the red nape. On adults of both sexes the rest of the head is white to buffish white. Their upperparts are mostly barred black and buffy or yellowish white, with white uppertail coverts that have a few black marks. Their flight feathers are black with white bars and tips on the primaries and secondaries. Their tail is mostly black with wide white bars on the innermost and outermost pairs of feathers. Their underparts are grayish with a buffy brown to pale yellow-olive tinge on the breast, whitish flanks and undertail coverts with black bars, and a red to orange red patch on the belly. Their iris is red to reddish brown, their bill is black, and their legs and feet are olive. Juveniles are duller overall than adults, have indistinct barring and often a reddish tinge on the upperparts, and have a larger but less distinct red patch on the belly. Males have a red crown patch and females a red crown with some black feathers.

Subspecies M. s. nyeanus is much smaller than the nominate. It has only a very small black supercilium and a slight green tinge to the underparts. M. s. blakei is also much smaller than the nominate. It has a darker and grayer face and underparts and a greenish-buff tinge to the upper back's pale bars. M. s. murceus is second in size to the nominate and has essentially the same plumage. M. s. caymanensis is smaller than murceus but somewhat larger than nyeanus and blakei. Its face has no black and the female's hindcrown is grayish. The pale bars on its back are strongly buffish and the black ones narrower than the nominate's. Its tail has more white.

== Distribution and habitat ==
The subspecies of West Indian woodpecker are found thus:

- M. s. nyeanus, San Salvador and formerly Grand Bahama islands in the Bahamas
- M. s. blakei, Great and Little Abaco islands in the Bahamas
- M. s. superciliaris, mainland Cuba and many offshore islands and cays
- M. s. murceus, Isla de la Juventud (Isle of Pines); Cayo Largo and Cayo Real though possibly extinct there
- M. s. caymanensis, Grand Cayman island

The West Indian woodpecker subspecies on mainland Cuba and Isla de la Juventud inhabit a variety of wooded landscapes, especially those with abundant royal palms (Roystonea regia), at elevations between sea level and 1,000 m (3,300 ft). M. s. nyeanus on San Salvador is almost entirely restricted to coppice of dense broadleaf vegetation with dead sabal palms (Sabal sp.). M. s. caymanensis inhabits most wooded landscapes on Grand Cayman but is most abundant in forest on limestone areas with little soil, where the vegetation is sparse and low. It shuns residential and open areas and mangroves. M. s. blakei inhabits most types of available woodlands on the Abacos and is common in residential areas.

== Behavior ==
=== Movement ===
All subspecies of the West Indian woodpecker are year-round residents of their respective ranges.

=== Feeding ===
The West Indian woodpecker's diet includes arthropods (mostly insects and spiders), vertebrates such as frogs and lizards, and seeds and fruit of many families. It forages on the ground and at all levels of the vegetation and takes its food by gleaning, pecking, and probing. Both the diet and foraging technique vary somewhat among the subspecies.

=== Breeding ===
The West Indian woodpecker nests between February and August and sometimes produces two broods in a year. The species usually remains paired year-round, and is territorial even outside the nesting season. Both sexes excavate the nest hole, usually in a dead palm or other tree and sometimes in utility poles. The nest is typically between 5 and 30 m (15 and 100 ft) above the ground. The clutch size is five or six eggs. The incubation period averages 12 days; the time to fledging is not known. Both parents incubate the eggs and provision nestlings and fledglings. Most pairs are monogamous but there is one record of a female laying eggs fathered by different males at two nests.

=== Vocal and non-vocal sounds ===
The West Indian woodpecker makes a "kwirr" or "churr", "a loud, rolling call...with a vaguely screaming quality" that is typically given from a perch. It also makes a "kra-kra-kra" call, and other vocalizations are suspected but not detailed. The species' drumming is "rapid tapping on a resonant surface such as a dead tree or utility pole to produce a steady roll (8), at a rate of c 17 strokes per second." It also makes a "slow, soft rapping sound" with the bill as part of courtship.

== Status ==
The IUCN has assessed the West Indian woodpecker as being of Least Concern. It has a large range but its population size is not known and is believed to be decreasing. No immediate threats have been identified. It is common on Cuba and Grand Cayman, but "populations on some small islands are vulnerable". The species has generally been resilient following hurricanes, but the increasing number and intensity of the storms due to climate change may prevent rebound. "The most important priority for protecting vulnerable populations of West Indian Woodpeckers is habitat protection."
