= Panabá Municipality =

Municipality in the Mexican state of Yucatán

Panabá
- Municipality
- Coat of arms

- Location within Mexico
- Coordinates: 21°17′N 88°16′W
- Country: Mexico
- State: Yucatán
- Mexico Ind.: 1821
- Yucatan Est.: 1824
- Elevation: 10 m (33 ft)

Population (2000)
  - Total: 7,802
- Time zone: UTC-6 (Central Standard Time)
- INEGI Code: 057
- Major Airport: Merida (Manuel Crescencio Rejón) International Airport
- IATA Code: MID
- ICAO Code: MMMD

Panabá Municipality is a municipality in the Mexican state of Yucatán. It is located in the eastern region of the Yucatán Peninsula's northern coast. Panabá is also the name of the municipality's largest township, which is also its municipal seat (cabecera municipal). The municipality borders San Felipe and Rio Lagartos to the north, Tizimín to the east, Sucilá to the south and the municipalities of Dzilam de Bravo and Dzilam González to the west.

== Political regionalisation ==
The municipality belongs to the First Federal Electoral District and the Tenth Local Election District.

== Foundation ==
Throughout the colonial period, Panabá was under the jurisdiction of Valladolid through Tizimín. During the nineteenth century Panabá was part of the municipality of Tizimín until 1918.

== Indigenous groups ==
The population of indigenous language (Yucatec Maya) speakers (5 years and over) is 2,465 people.

== Demographic trends ==
According to the Census of Population and Housing made in June 2010 by the INEGI, the total population of the municipality was 7,461 people, of whom 3,718 are male and 3,713 are female. The total population of the town represents 0.32 per cent of the total population of the state.

== Climate ==
Climate data for Panabá
Month	Jan	Feb	Mar	Apr	May	Jun	Jul	Aug	Sep	Oct	Nov	Dec	Year
Mean daily maximum °C (°F)	30.2 (86.4)	30.4 (86.7)	31.8 (89.2)	33.0 (91.4)	33.1 (91.6)	33.2 (91.8)	32.9 (91.2)	33.6 (92.5)	32.5 (90.5)	31.6 (88.9)	30.8 (87.4)	31.0 (87.8)	32.0 (89.6)
Mean daily minimum °C (°F)	14 (57)	15.3 (59.5)	17 (63)	18.0 (64.4)	18.6 (65.5)	19.5 (67.1)	19.8 (67.6)	19.8 (67.6)	19.6 (67.3)	18.4 (65.1)	16.4 (61.5)	14.8 (58.6)	17.6 (63.7)
Average precipitation mm (inches)	41 (1.6)	38 (1.5)	43 (1.7)	33 (1.3)	89 (3.5)	150 (5.9)	140 (5.5)	160 (6.4)	200 (8)	120 (4.7)	51 (2)	51 (2)	1,120 (44.1)
Source: Weatherbase

== Education, health and housing ==
The town has 4 levels of schools: preschool, primary, secondary and high school. There is a library located in the headquarters. A literacy campaign made by the National Institute for Adult Education (INEA) succeeded in increasing literacy in the municipality. In 1980, there was 663 people counted as illiterate and by 1986 this number was reduced to 136. According to the 2010 census, the literacy rate for people between 15 and 24 years of age was 97.2%.
