= List of schools in Espita Municipality, Yucatán =

This is a list of schools in Espita Municipality, Yucatan. In the municipality there are 34 schools, of which 12 are preschools, 16 are primary schools, 5 are secondary schools and one is a high school.

== Dzadz Pichi ==
This is a list of the schools in Dzadz Pichi, Yucatan.

=== Preschool education ===
Schools of preschool education

- Preescolar Indígena Paepi.

=== Primary schools ===
Schools of primary education

- Primaria Comunitaria Indígena.

== Espita ==
This is a list of the schools in the town of Espita, Yucatan.

=== Preschool education ===
Schools of preschool education

- Cecilio Chi.
- Rosario Castellanos.
- Tum ben há.
- Prudencio Patrón Peniche.

=== Primary schools ===
Schools of primary education

- Estado de Michoacán.
- Rafael Ramírez Castañeda.
- Cecilio Chi.
- Prudencio Patrón Peniche.
- Nueva Creación.
- Manuela Olivares.

=== Secondary education ===
Schools of secondary education

- Escuela Secundaria Técnica Num. 12.
- Dr. Fabián Vallado Escalante.

=== High school ===
High schools in Espita.

- Colegio de Estudios Científicos y Tecnológicos del Estado de Yucatán (Cecytey),

== Holca ==
This is a list of the schools in Holca, Yucatan.

=== Preschool education ===
Schools of preschool education

- Francisco Villa.

=== Primary schools ===
Schools of primary education

- Emiliano Zapata.

=== Secondary education ===
Schools of secondary education

- Prudencio Patrón Peniche.

== Kunche ==
This is a list of the schools in Kunche, Yucatan.

=== Preschool education ===
Schools of preschool education

- Javier Chan.

=== Primary schools ===
Schools of primary education

- Alonso Chan.

== Nacuche ==
This is a list of the schools in Nacuche, Yucatan.

=== Preschool education ===
Schools of preschool education

- Angela Peralta.

=== Primary schools ===
Schools of primary education

- Benito Juárez García.
- Benito Juárez García.

=== Secondary education ===
Schools of secondary education

- Mercedes Peniche López.

== San Pedro Chenchela ==
This is a list of the schools in San Pedro Chenchela, Yucatan.

=== Preschool education ===
Schools of preschool education

- Preescolar comunitario.

=== Primary schools ===
Schools of primary education

- Alfredo Peniche Erosa.

== Tuzik ==
This is a list of the schools in Tuzik, Yucatan.

=== Preschool education ===
Schools of preschool education

- Preescolar comunitario.

=== Primary schools ===
Schools of primary education

- Hermanos Serdan.

=== Secondary education ===
Schools of secondary education

- Nicolás Bravo.

== X-Ualtez ==
This is a list of the schools in X-Ualtez, Yucatan.

=== Preschool education ===
Schools of preschool education

- Preescolar comunitario.

=== Primary schools ===
Schools of primary education

- Felipe Carrillo Puerto.

== Xuilub ==
This is a list of the schools in Xuilub, Yucatan.

=== Preschool education ===
Schools of preschool education

- Preescolar comunitario.

=== Primary schools ===
Schools of primary education

- Francisco Mendoza Palma.
