= Tizimín Municipality =

Municipality in the Mexican state of Yucatán

Tizimín
- Municipality
- Coat of arms

- Region 5 Noreste #096

- Location of the Municipality in Mexico
- Country: Mexico
- State: Yucatán
- Mexico Ind.: 1821
- Yucatan Est.: 1824
- Municipality Est.: 1921

Government
  - Municipal President: José Dolores Mezo Peniche (PAN)

Area
  - Total: 4,132.37 km^{2} (1,595.52 sq mi)

Population (2010)
  - Total: 73,135
  - Demonym: Tizimilean
- Time zone: UTC-6 (Central Standard Time)
- Postal Code: 97730
- Area code: 986
- INEGI Code: 31096

Tizimín Municipality is a municipality in the Mexican state of Yucatán. The municipality is located in the north-east of the Mexican state of Yucatán, and it is the largest municipality in the state with a territory that is 11% of the total area of the state. As of 2005 it also has the second largest population of any municipality in the state, the largest being Mérida and the third largest being Valladolid.

The city of Tizimín is the municipal seat and is located at about 160 km east of Mérida, Yucatán, 200 km west of Cancún, Quintana Roo, and 42 km south of Río Lagartos, the city's traditional sea port on the Gulf of Mexico. The municipal seat's population of 42,283 is about 60% of the total population of the municipality.

The word "Tizimin" means "tapir" in the Maya language. With the Spanish conquest of Yucatán, Tizimín was established as a Spanish colonial town in 1544.

== Boundaries ==
The Gulf of Mexico is its northern border and Quintana Roo is its eastern border. And the municipality borders the following municipalities: to the south Temozón, Calotmul and Chemax; and to the west Sucilá, Panabá and Río Lagartos.

== Communities ==
The municipality has 588 named communities, of which the most important are:

- Chan Cenote
- Colonia Yucatán
- Dzonot Carretero
- El Cuyo (small port located on the northeast of the town of Tizimin)
- Kikil
- Popolnáh
- Tixcancal
- Tizimin (municipal seat)

== Economy ==
The city of Tizimín is the second most economically important city of Yucatán state, only after the municipality of Mérida. It has good diversification of commerce. The main activities take place in the agricultural, forestry, industry, fisheries and tourism. Its production of meat, milk and cheese serving a large percentage of the needs of the state of Yucatán and the adjacent territory upstate Quintana Roo, including a good part of the robust demand for Cancun, the town that is one of the main drivers of the economy in southeastern Mexico.

Supporting this active economic development, the municipality has a broad network of educational infrastructure, health facilities, highways and hotels.

== Tourist attractions ==
Cenotes

- Paccha
- 3 Bocas
- Azul

The former convent and parish of the Holy Kings built in the seventeenth century.

Ex convent and temple of San Francisco built in the sixteenth century.

Archaeological:

- Ake Dzonot
- El palmar
- Chunhuele
- Xlacab
- Panabá
- Haltunchen
- Xuencal

Annual agricultural and industrial exhibition.

== Festivals ==
Tizimín is known for its festival in honor of the Three Kings. The festivities begin on December 29 and conclude on January 6 of the following year.

In Sucopo there is a festival honoring the Virgin of the Candelaria, from 28 to 31 January.

== History ==
In the days before the Spanish conquest of Yucatán, Tizimin municipality was a part of the province of Cupules.

1542 The Spanish captain Sebastian Burgos, with his companion Francisco de Montejo (a Nephew), conquered the territory.

1543 The town of Valladolid is founded on the banks of the lagoon Chouac-Ha. (Chouac-Ha lagoon, which was the original location of the now city of Valladolid, now belongs to the municipality of Tizimin.) While Valladolid was founded in here, it was later abandoned as the residents had too many problems with mosquitoes and humidity. As the site is part of the municipality of Tizimin, the fact that this historical event that occurred in the municipality is highlighted as part of its history.

1549 Tizimin was a land parcel owned by Captain Sebastian de Burgos.

1824 The State Congress decrees the reestablishment of Indian republics. Tizimin was one of those republics.

1835 A conservative unitary system of government was instituted in Mexico (a centralized dictatorship unconstitutionally brought forth and held by the then-President: Santa Anna. Yucatán became a department, and authority was imposed from the center.

1838 Discontent increased and an insurrection erupted in Tizimín in May, advocating Yucatecan independence.

1870 This year the parish priest of the village of Tizimin, Manuel Luciano Perez, sends a rare manuscript that has been called Chilam Balam of Tizimin to the Bishop of Yucatán, Crescendo Carrillo y Ancona, with the remark that it has been in his possession for a number of years. It is now preserved in the National Museum of Anthropology and History in Mexico City.

1913 On November 30 the inauguration of the railway from Espita-Tizimin, on this day the first locomotive arrives at the station in Tizimin.

1943 On May 29 start of the fourth centenary celebrations of the founding of Valladolid, in the Chouac-Ha (in this place was founded the city of Valladolid on the site that belongs to the municipality of Tizimin).

1975 For the first time in the history of Yucatán, a European monarch comes to visit Tizimin and its people. On February 28 Queen Elizabeth II of the United Kingdom of Great Britain formally inaugurated the zoo and botanical garden at Tizimin. Queen Elizabeth II also visited Uxmal and until recently the chain that was added so that she could climb the temple of the magician was still in place.
