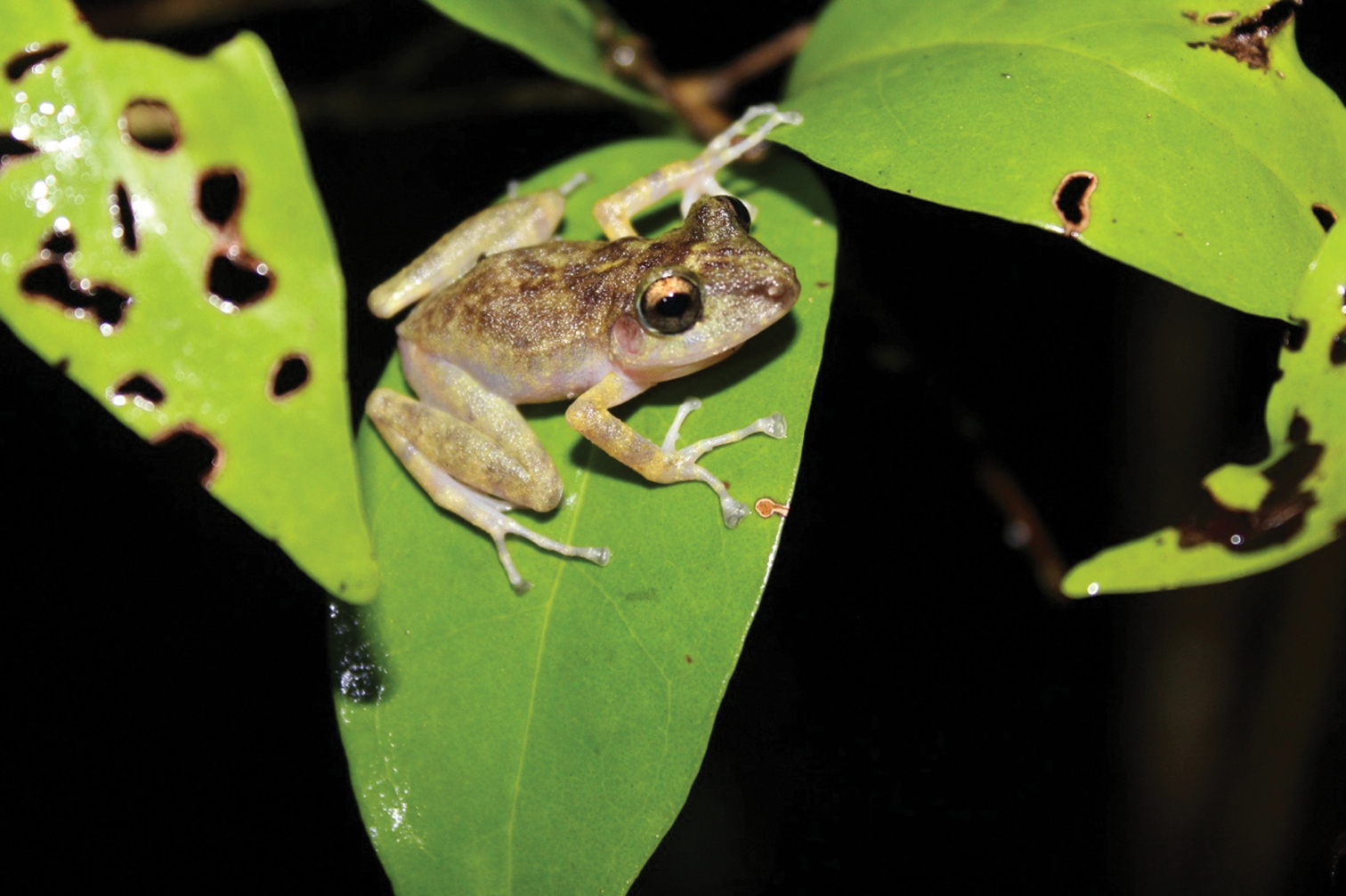
- An adult male at X-Can, Mexico.

Conservation status
- Near Threatened (IUCN 3.1)

Scientific classification
- Kingdom: Animalia
- Phylum: Chordata
- Class: Amphibia
- Order: Anura
- Family: Craugastoridae
- Genus: Craugastor
- Species: C. yucatanensis

Binomial name
- Craugastor yucatanensis (Lynch, 1965)

Synonyms
- Eleutherodactylus yucatanensis Lynch, 1965 "1964"

= Craugastor yucatanensis =

Species of amphibian

Craugastor yucatanensis, also known as the Yucatan robber frog or Yucatan rainfrog, is a species of frog in the family Craugastoridae. It is endemic to the northern part of the Yucatan Peninsula, Mexico. Both terrestrial and arboreal in its lifestyle, its natural habitat are tropical lowland semi-deciduous and deciduous forests. It is threatened by habitat loss caused by tourism.
