= Ría Lagartos Biosphere Reserve =

UNESCO Biosphere Reserve in Yucatán, Mexico

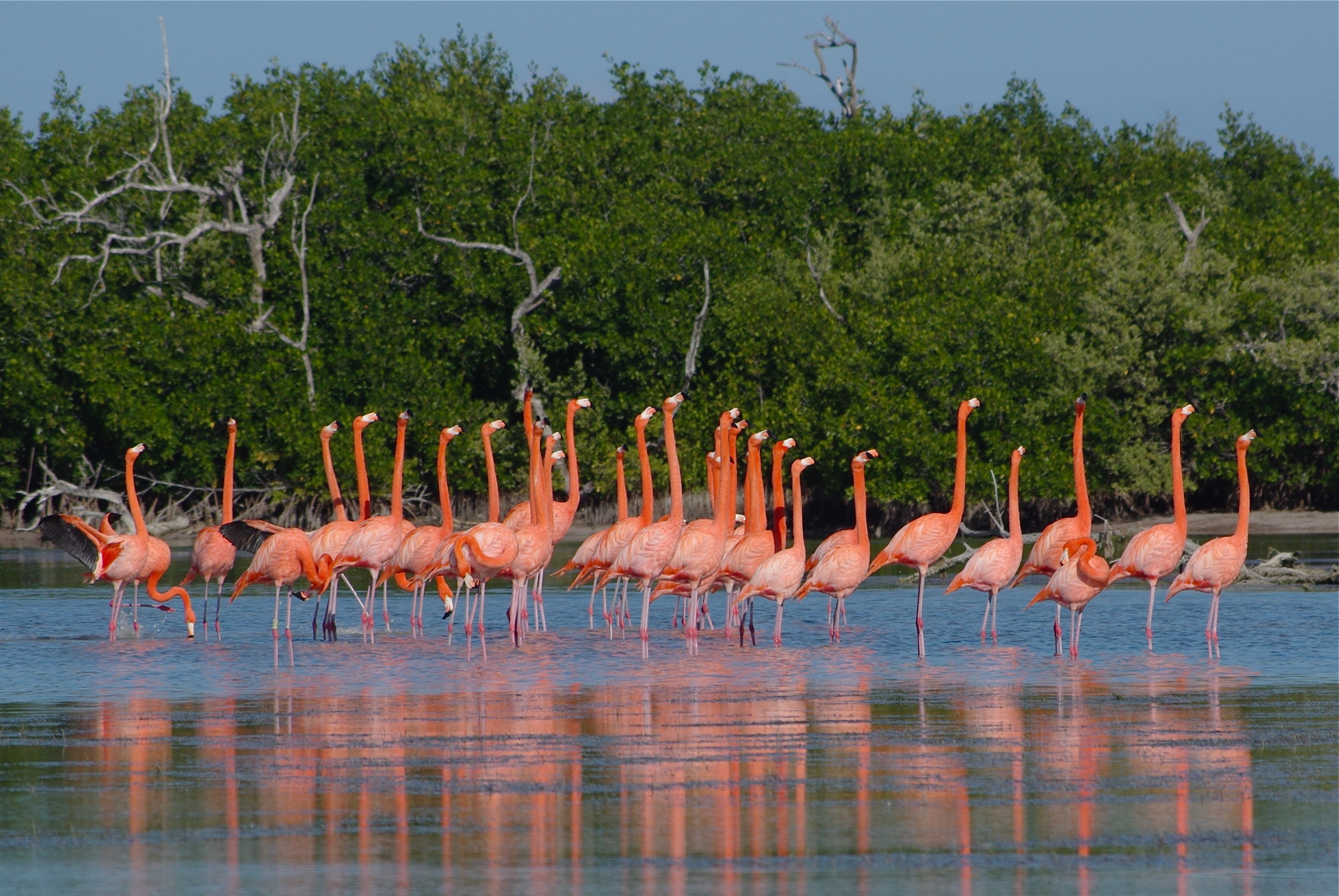
- Flamingoes at Ría Lagartos

- Location within Mexico
- Location: Yucatán Peninsula, Mexico
- Nearest town: San Felipe, Yucatán; Río Lagartos, Yucatán
- Coordinates: 21°35′25″N 88°06′44″W
- Area: 60,348 hectares (233.00 sq mi)
- Established: 2004
- Governing body: National Commission of Natural Protected Areas

Ramsar Wetland
- Official name: Humedal de Importancia Especialmente para la Conservación de Aves Acuáticas Reserva Ría Lagartos
- Designated: 4 July 1986
- Reference no.: 332

Ría Lagartos Biosphere Reserve (Spanish: Reserva de la Biósfera Ría Lagartos) (established 2004) is a UNESCO Biosphere Reserve in the state of Yucatán, Mexico. The reserve is located at the eastern end of the coastal strip of the Yucatán Peninsula, with the Gulf of Mexico at its northern limit. The area encompasses coastal areas of the Gulf of Mexico and includes important wetlands designated under the Ramsar Wetlands Convention. The site presents a rich diversity of landscapes and ecosystems, such as mangroves, small estuaries, medium semi-evergreen forest, low deciduous forest, coastal dune vegetation, coastal lagoons, marshes (petenes) and savanna represented by tular vegetation, grasslands and reed beds that are the main nesting sites for marshland and sea birds.

The reserve's surface area (terrestrial and marine) is 60,348 hectares (233.00 sq mi). The core area is 23,681.55 hectares (91.4350 sq mi), surrounded by buffer zone(s) of 36,666.28 hectares (141.5693 sq mi).

== Ecology ==
Ría Lagartos extends throughout a large wetland area which is a good example of a community characteristic for a coastal tropical savanna climate. The area is considered a globally unique wetland due to its high biological productivity, which in turn is due to conditions of marine to hypersalinity in a karst environment. Given its geographic position, the peninsula keeps a floristic relation with the neighboring regions of Central America, the river basin of the Caribbean Sea and southeastern Mexico.

=== Flora and fauna ===
The wetlands is home to at least 2,477 species and 98 varieties of vascular plants. At least 554 vertebrate species can be seen in the reserve, amongst them 142 endemics. Some of the more common animal species include:

- American crocodile
- American flamingo
- American pygmy kingfisher
- American white pelican
- bare-throated tiger heron
- black ctenosaur
- black skimmer
- black vulture
- black-bellied plover
- black-bellied whistling-duck
- black-necked stilt
- brown basilisk
- brown pelican
- common black hawk
- double-crested cormorant
- golden-fronted woodpecker
- great blue heron
- great kiskadee
- great-tailed grackle
- green heron
- green sea turtle
- hawksbill sea turtle
- hooded oriole
- killdeer
- laughing falcon
- laughing gull
- little blue heron
- magnificent frigatebird
- mangrove swallow
- morelet's crocodile
- muscovy duck
- neotropic cormorant
- northern cardinal
- northern jacana
- northern mockingbird
- northern waterthrush
- olive-throated parakeet
- osprey
- peregrine falcon
- raccoon
- red-winged blackbird
- royal tern
- snowy egret
- tricolored heron
- tropical kingbird
- turquoise-browed motmot
- vermilion flycatcher
- wood stork
- Yucatan jay
- Yucatan woodpecker

== Human impact ==
In the last years, the vegetation has been strongly affected by human activities, particularly by agriculture and livestock raising, practices that imply the destruction of vast surfaces of vegetation. Also, it has been affected by natural catastrophes like the hurricanes that regularly hit this region and the subsequent forest fires. The communities located in the biosphere reserve are San Felipe, Río Lagartos, Las Coloradas and El Cuyo. 6,916 permanent residents live in the buffer zone. The use of natural resources dates back to the pre-Hispanic period. The main productive activities today include fishing, agriculture, livestock rearing, salt extraction, tourism, aquaculture and urban development. The ecotourism activity is stimulated to promote the participation of local inhabitants in the conservation of the natural, archaeological, historical and cultural heritage of the biosphere reserve, providing appropriate economic and social benefits.

From a cultural point of view, the territory includes an important Mayan zone dating back to the period of 300 to 50 years BC. The territory belonged to the chieftainship of Ecab in the pre-Hispanic period. Eighteen of the 1,585 identified archaeological sites in Yucatán are located in this area. In addition, the reserve counts three of the eight concheros (banks of marine shells) that exist in the state.

== Sources ==
This article incorporates text from a free content work (license statement/permission). Text taken from UNESCO - MAB Biosphere Reserves Directory, UNESCO, UNESCO.
