= Instituto Via Delphi =

Mexican non-profit organization

Coordinates: 20°34′49.45″N 87°7′0.08″W

The Via Delphi Institute for Research on Marine Mammals is a Mexican non-profit organization established to generate scientific knowledge about marine mammals, mostly of the Tursiops truncatus species (common bottlenose dolphin). The research center is located in the state of Quintana Roo, near Cancún, where the scientific members make indoor studies. The Via Delphi Institute also conducts research programs with wild dolphin populations from the Campeche and Tabasco coasts, in the Gulf of Mexico, and in Holbox Island in the Mexican Caribbean Sea. The institute is divided in two working groups, one composed of biologists and the other of veterinarians, both supported by graduate students and volunteers.

== History and achievements ==
The Via Delphi Institute was formally constituted in 2007 with the signing of a cooperation agreement with the National Autonomous University of Mexico (UNAM.) This agreement establishes some sets for scientific programs between the Via Delphi Institute, the Biology Institute, and the Sciences and Veterinary faculty of UNAM. The Via Delphi Institute has also worked with CINVESTAV (from the National Polytechnic Institute) in Mérida, the University of Veracruz, the University of San Nicolas de Hidalgo, Michoacán, and the Tec Institute of Seas Studies in Veracruz, among others.

== Research certification ==
With a certification given by the RENIECYT through the National Commission of Science and Technology CONACYT, the Via Delphi Institute receives official support from this recognized public commission, providing it an important status in the Mexican scientific research field. As a result of the institute's research, more than 61 works had been submitted in various worldwide forums, including The Annual Meeting of the Marine Mammal Society, IMATA, The International Association of Aquatic Mammals, and the meetings of the International Association of Aquatic Mammals Medicine.

== Tursiops truncatus breeding program ==
One of the most successful projects of the Via Delphi Institute is the Tursiops truncatus breeding program. This program has a meticulous system of veterinary medicine and medical training. The work has reached a survival average of 70%. During 2008, Via Delphi reached a 100% survival rate, obtaining 11 successful births. The previous achievement inscribes the Via Delphi's Breeding program in the Guinness World Records.

== Via Delphi Institute research programs ==
- Noninvasive monitoring of reproductive stages in dolphins Tursiops truncatus in natural limited environments by the quantification of fecal steroids and reproductive behavioral observation and its ultrasound correlation.
- Abundance and distribution registration of dolphins Tursiops truncatus in the coast area of the Ria Lagartos biosphere, Yucatán, Mexico.
- Following identified dolphins in Laguna de Términos, Campeche.
- Registry of birth, growth, and behavioral development of offspring born in limited natural environments.
- Morphometric registry of dolphins under guard at Via Delphi Group.
- Registry of maternal care in female Tursiops truncatus with different levels of experience establishing dominance hierarchies in dolphins kept in limited natural environments.
- Registration of marine mammals stranded on the shores of the Gulf of Mexico and the Caribbean.
- Growth recording of a baby manatee Trichechus manatus manatus rescued and rehabilitated in the Via Delphi Group facilities.
- Genetic characterization of Tursiops truncatus dolphins kept in limited natural environments.

== Institutional collaboration ==
- UNAM
- CONACYT
- SOMEMMA, Mexican Society for Marine Mammalogy
- IAAAM, International Association for Aquatic Animal Medicine
- SMM, The Society for Marine Mammalogy
- IMATA, International Marine Animal Trainers Association
