= Río Lagartos Municipality =

Municipality in the Mexican state of Yucatán

Río Lagartos
- Municipality
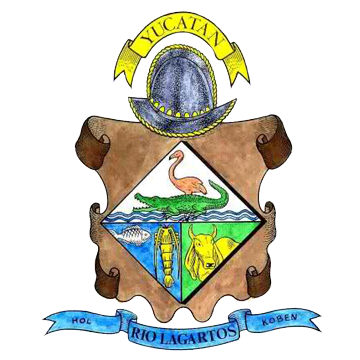
- Coat of arms

- Region 5 Noreste #061

- Location of the Municipality in Mexico
- Coordinates: 21°35′51″N 88°09′28″W
- Country: Mexico
- State: Yucatán
- Mexico Ind.: 1821
- Yucatán Est.: 1824

Government
  - Type: 2012–2015
  - Municipal President: Elmer Santiago Contreras Tabasco

Area
  - Total: 249.09 km^{2} (96.17 sq mi)
- Elevation: 2 m (6.6 ft)

Population (2010)
  - Total: 3,438
  - Density: 13.80/km^{2} (35.75/sq mi)
  - Demonym: Umanense
- Time zone: UTC-6 (Central Standard Time)
- INEGI Code: 061
- Major Airport: Merida (Manuel Crescencio Rejón) International Airport
- IATA Code: MID
- ICAO Code: MMMD

Río Lagartos Municipality (Spanish language: "river of alligators") is a municipality in the Mexican state of Yucatán containing 249.09 km^{2} of land and is located roughly 215 kilometres (134 mi) northeast of the city of Mérida.

== History ==
There is no accurate data on when the town was founded, but before the conquest, it was part of the chieftainship of Ecab. After colonization, it became the Spanish colony's northeastern port. Before 1580, Antonio Rodríguez convinced the Yucatecan Governor Guillén de las Casas to appoint him as guard of the port. Rodríguez negotiated with the chieftains Chuyubchuen, Kikil, Panabá and Sucopó to provide him with indigenous workers to mine salt, fish or make ashes for soap. He secured almost a monopoly on the native workers requiring any Spaniard wanting to open a new enterprise to negotiate with him to rent workers.

Yucatán declared its independence from the Spanish Crown in 1821, and in 1825 the area was assigned to the Valladolid Municipality. In 1905, it was assigned to the Tizimín Municipality and in 1988 it was confirmed as head of its own municipality.

== Governance ==
The municipal president is elected for a three-year term. The town council has four councilpersons, who serve as Secretary and councilors of health, education, public security and cemeteries.

== Communities ==
The head of the municipality is Río Lagartos, Yucatán. The municipality has 36 populated places besides the seat including Las Coloradas, El Edén, Paraíso, San Pablo, Santa Cruz, Santa Pilar Trejo, Santa Rita, Serrano, Tacxahan, and Zabich. The significant populations are shown below:

Community	Population
Entire Municipality (2010)	3,438
Las Coloradas	1068 in 2005
Río Lagartos	2127 in 2005

== Local festivals ==
Every year on 25 July there is a festival to patron of the town, Saint James the Apostle.

== Tourist attractions ==
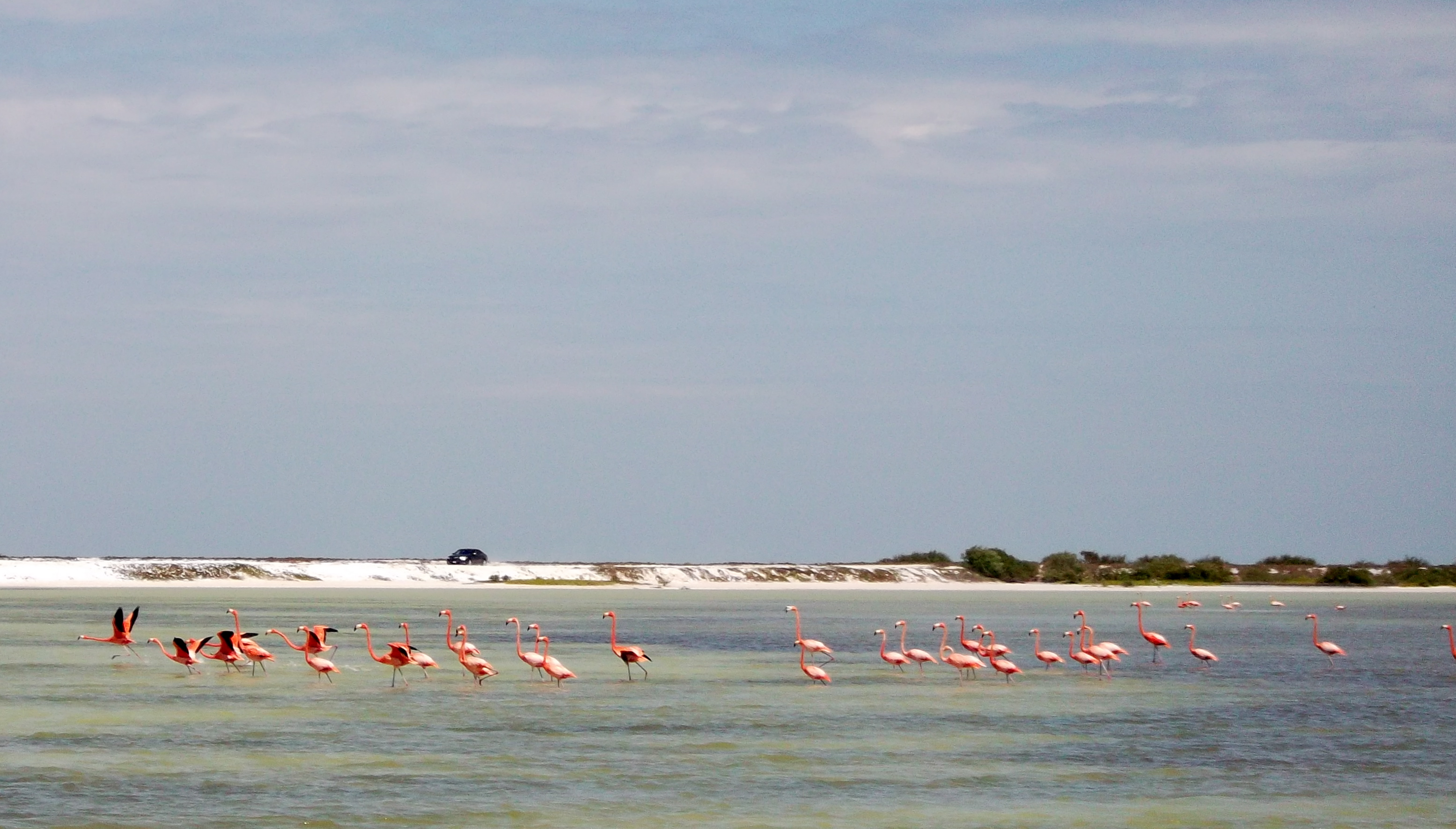
Ría Lagartos

- Birding tours
- Cenote Chiquila
- Cenote Peten Tuchja
- Cenote San Luis Culemix
- Cenote San Manuel
- Cenote San Pedro
- Cenote Santa Pilar
