= Cupul National Airport =

Defunct airfield in Tizimín, Yucatán, Mexico

Tizimín Airfield Aeropuerto de Tizimín
- IATA: ~~TZM~~; ICAO: ~~MM72~~

Summary
- Airport type: Civil
- Serves: Tizimín, Yucatan, Mexico
- Time zone: CST (UTC−06:00)
- Coordinates: 21°9′19″N 88°10′20″W

Map
- Location of the airfield in Yucatán ~~TZM~~ (Mexico)

Runways
Direction	Length		Surface
Direction	m	ft	Surface
~~13/31~~	~~1,200~~	~~3,937~~	~~Asphalt~~
- Sources: GCM, STV,

Tizimín Airfield (Spanish: Aeropuerto de Tizimín), also known as Aeropuerto Nacional Cupul (Cupul National Airport) ~~(IATA: TZM)~~ was an airfield located in Tizimín, Yucatan, Mexico. It served as the main airport for Tizimín, primarily accommodating general aviation activities. Over time, the airfield has been abandoned, with a new police station constructed on the eastern end of the runway. The closest airports currently handling commercial flights are Mérida International Airport and Cancún International Airport.

== See also ==
- List of the busiest airports in Mexico
- List of airports in Mexico
- List of airports by ICAO code: M
- List of busiest airports in North America
- List of the busiest airports in Latin America
- Transportation in Mexico
- Tourism in Mexico
- Mérida International Airport
- Cancún International Airport
