= Espita, Yucatán =

Espita
- Town
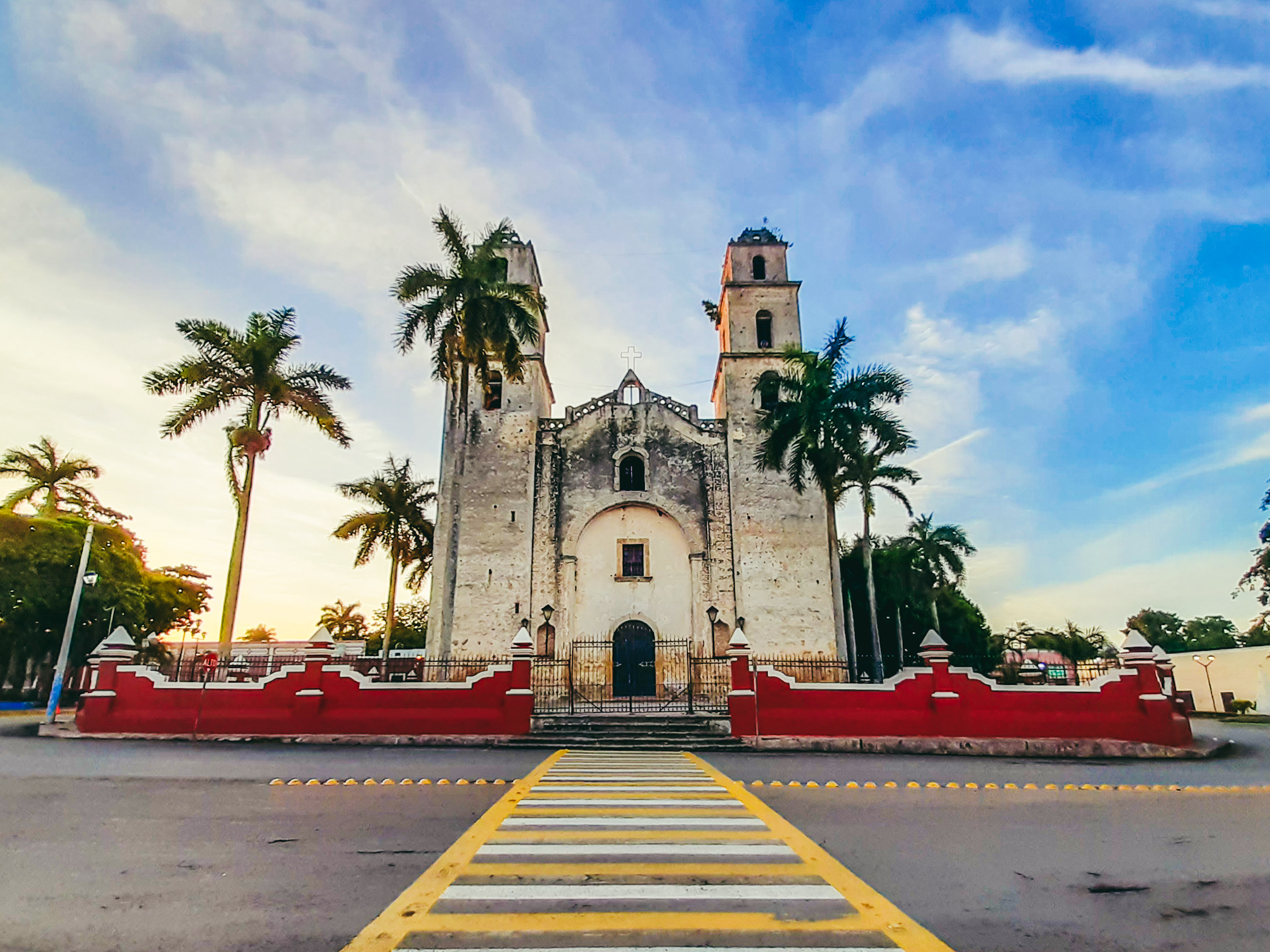

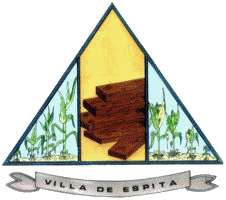
- Seal
- Motto: "The Athens of Yucatan"
- Location within Yucatán (state) Location within Mexico
- Coordinates: 21°00′46″N 88°18′17″W
- Country: Mexico
- State: Yucatán
- Municipality: Espita Municipality

Government
  - Municipal president: Carlos Erosa Correa

Area
  - Total: 6.47 km^{2} (2.50 sq mi)
- Elevation: 27 m (89 ft)

Population (INEGI, 2010)
  - Total: 11,551
  - Density: 1,662.75/km^{2} (4,306.5/sq mi)
- Demonym: espitan
- Time zone: UTC−6 (Central Standard Time)
- ZIP Code: 97730
- Area code: 986
- INEGI Code: 310320001
- Website: www.espita.gob.mx

Espita is a town in Espita Municipality, Yucatán (Mexico) located on the Litoral Oriente (East Coast) or Region I of Yucatan. It has an average height of 27 meters and is located at a distance of 165 km from the Merida City, 80 km from Izamal, 58 km from Chichen Itza, 49 km from Valladolid, 35 km from Ekʼ Balam and 27 km from Tizimín.

During pre-Hispanic times, the site where the town stands today was part of the province of the cupules, where later, with the arrival of the Spanish, was founded the present town and established the encomienda system in 1549. Since colonization vast buildings were built, among which stands the church dedicated to Saint Joseph. In the nineteenth century, the town housed some of the most important maize haciendas in the state, due to its booming economy and the impulse to culture, Espita was considered one of the cultural centers of the Yucatan, and he was known by the nickname of "The Athens of Yucatan". Towards the second half of the twentieth century, the town experienced a decline in its development due in large part to the closure of the haciendas and the consequent decline of its economy.

Today Espita is the fourth most populous town in the eastern of Yucatan, only after Valladolid, Tizimín and Chemax.

In 2023, Espita was designated a Pueblo Mágico by the Mexican government, recognizing its cultural and historical importance.

== Toponymy ==
There are several versions of the original name of the town, the most accepted argument is that it was called x pʼíit jaʼ, which literally means "little water" in the Yucatec Maya language.

The name Espita was given to the town by the Spanish while they were in the conquest of Yucatan. Espita name remained so for three centuries, until the September 15, 1876, when the town council changed the official name to Espita de Peniche Gutiérrez; same as, to date, completely not used in any official document.

== History ==
During pre-Hispanic times, the site where now stands the town belonged to the province of the cupules. Espita, as such, was founded during the Spanish conquest of Yucatán near the 1520s. In 1549 the spanish established the encomienda system in the town, a short time later after the founding of this population.

During 1825 it became part of the party of Tizimin. Around November 30, 1840, was placed as head of the eponymous party created the same year.

On February 15, 1848, despite resistance from their neighbors, Espita fell into the hands of indigenous rebels during the Caste War, same as in 1850 led the espitans to defend the people against the attack of the indigenous rebels in known as the heroic deeds of the large fifteen of Espita.

On April 29, 1852, the State Legislature elevated the place to the category of town. During September 15, 1876, the town council changed the official name to Espita de Peniche Gutiérrez.

== Geography ==
=== Climate ===
Climate data for Espita
Month	Jan	Feb	Mar	Apr	May	Jun	Jul	Aug	Sep	Oct	Nov	Dec	Year
Record high °C (°F)	39.7 (103.5)	35.5 (95.9)	39.9 (103.8)	39.3 (102.7)	42.0 (107.6)	39.6 (103.3)	39.0 (102.2)	38.9 (102.0)	38.1 (100.6)	38.0 (100.4)	39.0 (102.2)	40.0 (104.0)	42.0 (107.6)
Mean daily maximum °C (°F)	29.6 (85.3)	30.4 (86.7)	32.7 (90.9)	34.8 (94.6)	36.2 (97.2)	34.5 (94.1)	34.6 (94.3)	34.4 (93.9)	33.5 (92.3)	32.3 (90.1)	30.9 (87.6)	29.8 (85.6)	32.8 (91.0)
Daily mean °C (°F)	22.8 (73.0)	23.5 (74.3)	25.4 (77.7)	27.5 (81.5)	28.8 (83.8)	28.2 (82.8)	27.8 (82.0)	27.5 (81.5)	27.0 (80.6)	26.3 (79.3)	24.6 (76.3)	23.2 (73.8)	26.1 (79.0)
Mean daily minimum °C (°F)	16.1 (61.0)	16.5 (61.7)	18.1 (64.6)	20.1 (68.2)	21.4 (70.5)	21.8 (71.2)	20.9 (69.6)	20.7 (69.3)	20.4 (68.7)	20.2 (68.4)	18.3 (64.9)	16.6 (61.9)	19.3 (66.7)
Record low °C (°F)	5.0 (41.0)	7.0 (44.6)	6.0 (42.8)	10.6 (51.1)	12.0 (53.6)	11.0 (51.8)	7.0 (44.6)	8.0 (46.4)	7.0 (44.6)	11.0 (51.8)	8.0 (46.4)	6.5 (43.7)	5.0 (41.0)
Average precipitation mm (inches)	50.5 (1.99)	35.2 (1.39)	22.8 (0.90)	39.0 (1.54)	104.5 (4.11)	168.6 (6.64)	132.7 (5.22)	142.4 (5.61)	189.6 (7.46)	125.2 (4.93)	53.2 (2.09)	47.6 (1.87)	1,111.3 (43.75)
Average precipitation days	4.1	3.3	2.2	2.8	5.6	10.0	10.6	11.0	12.4	10.8	4.7	4.4	81.9
Source: Servicio Meteorológico Nacional

== Demographics ==
Historical population
Year	Pop.	±%
1900	2,527	—
1910	2,441	−3.4%
1921	4,496	+84.2%
1930	4,253	−5.4%
1940	4,504	+5.9%
1950	4,948	+9.9%
1960	5,161	+4.3%
1970	5,394	+4.5%
1980	5,779	+7.1%
1990	8,279	+43.3%
2000	9,375	+13.2%
2010	11,551	+23.2%
Source: Archivo Histórico de Localidades

According to the 2005 census made by the INEGI, the population of the town was 10,758 (74.54% of the municipality), of which 5,429 were men and 5,329 women. According to CONAPO, the expected population of 2010 is 12,110 people and 12,390 in 2011.

== Education ==
Type	Students	Teachers	Schools
Preschool education	569	21	4
Primary education	1 829	59	6
Secondary education	485	40	2
High school	368	25	1
Total	3 251	145	13
Source: Secretaría de Educación de Yucatán.

== Culture ==
=== Popular festivities ===
The festivities in honor of baby Jesus, who along with Saint Joseph is the catholic patron saint of Espita, held from December 19 to 29, being the December 25 the main day of festivities.

Are held apart from the various religious ceremonies, bullfights, gremios (dances during the day), dances in the evenings and traditional vaquerías. The final day is usually a walk around town and sang happy birthday to the saint accompanied by mariachis.

The county fair usually runs until the December 31 and it will receive visitors from all neighboring towns and families with origins in the town who live mainly in the cities of Cancún and Mérida, Yucatán.

Since 2009, the fair activities are managed by the group called "Asociación de Palqueros en Fortalecimiento de Nuestras Tradiciones" which is responsible for overseeing the activities of the celebration in honor of baby Jesus.

During the month of March is celebrated in San José, which is the main employer in the community since before 1650, and in his honor was erected in the village church, although not given as much attention as the December celebration. Unlike the celebration of December 25, the feast of San José is limited to masses and lacks a community festival with dairy, dancing and bullfights.

Espita at December

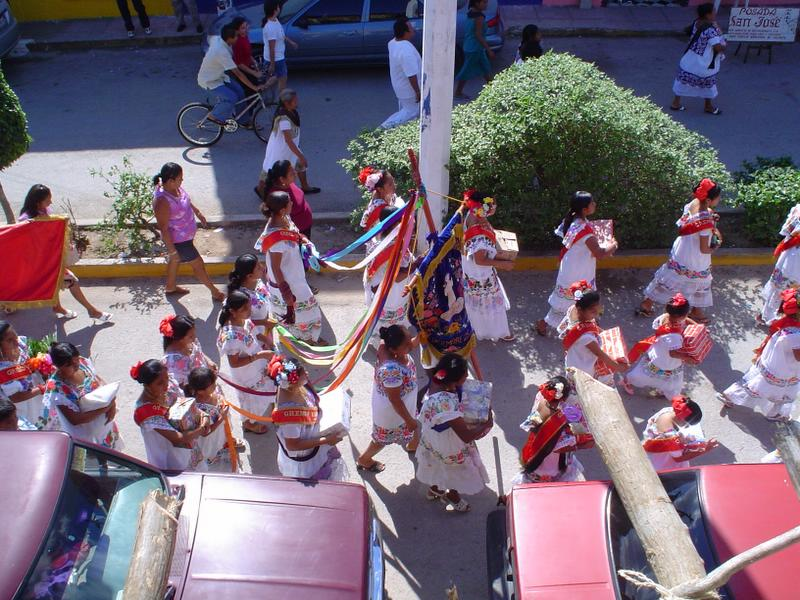
Gremios

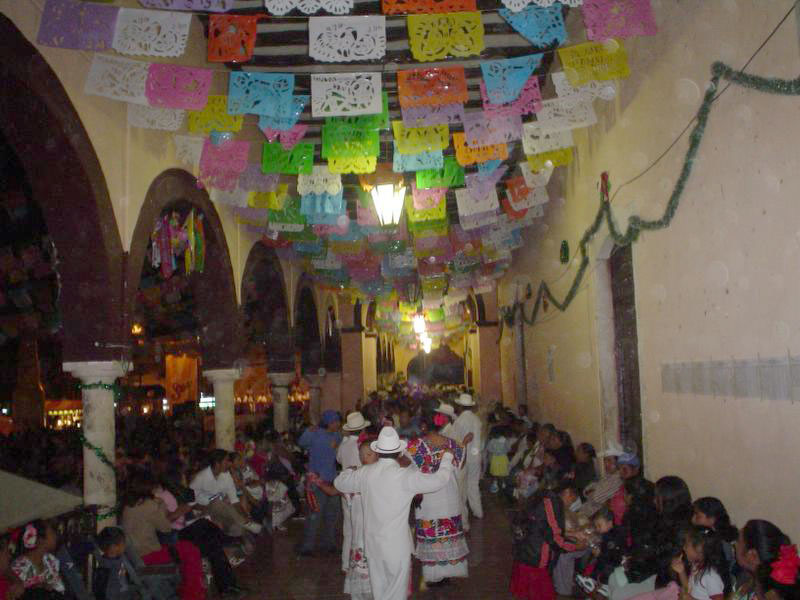
Vaquerías

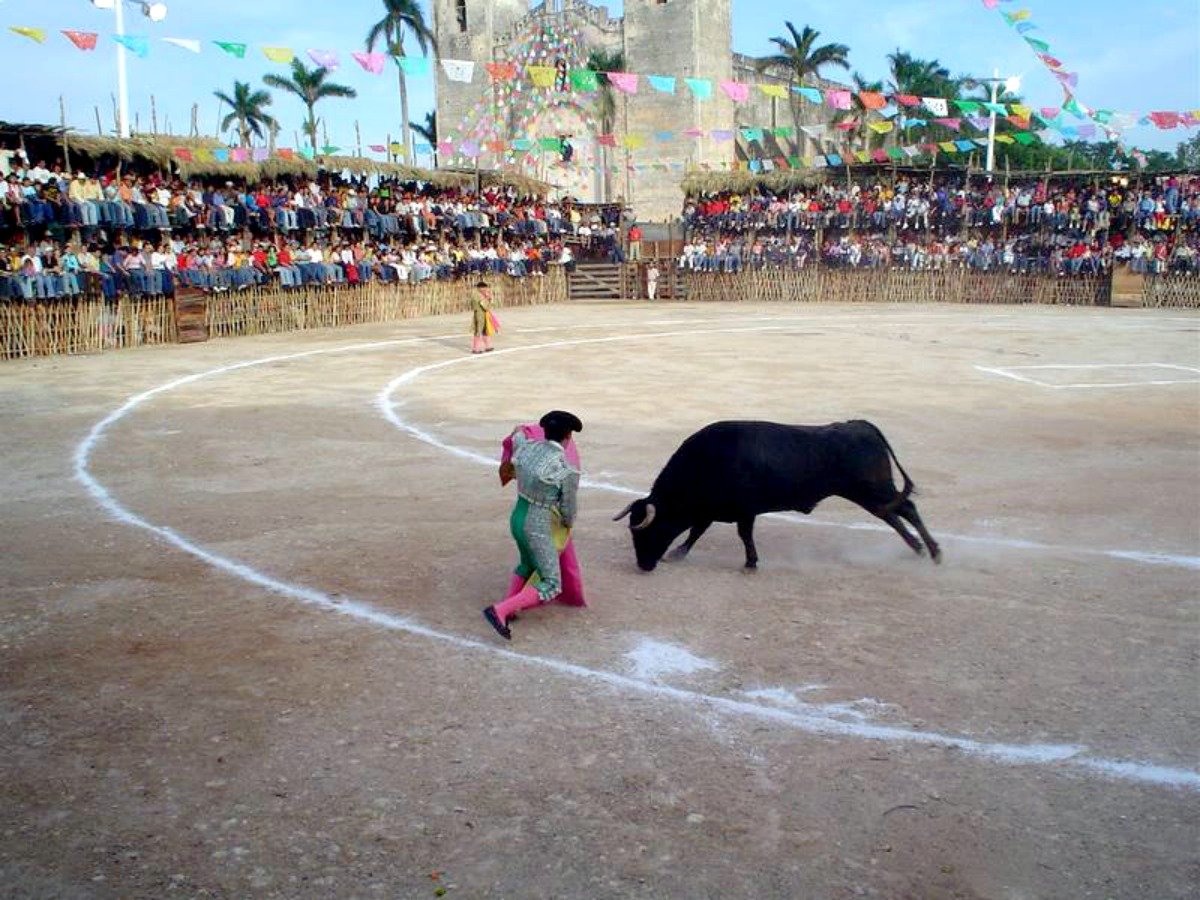
Bullfights

== See also ==
- Espita Municipality
- Yucatán
