= Sucilá Municipality =

Municipality in the Mexican state of Yucatán

Sucilá
- Municipality
- Region 5 Noreste #070

- Location of the Municipality in Mexico
- Coordinates: 21°09′16″N 88°18′49″W
- Country: Mexico
- State: Yucatán
- Mexico Ind.: 1821
- Yucatán Est.: 1824

Government
  - Type: 2012–2015
  - Municipal President: Delfio Amir Peniche Monforte

Area
  - Total: 256.76 km^{2} (99.14 sq mi)
- Elevation: 15 m (49 ft)

Population (2010)
  - Total: 3,930
  - Density: 15.3/km^{2} (39.6/sq mi)
  - Demonym: Suquilense
- Time zone: UTC-6 (Central Standard Time)
- INEGI Code: 070
- Major Airport: Merida (Manuel Crescencio Rejón) International Airport
- IATA Code: MID
- ICAO Code: MMMD

Sucilá Municipality (Spanish pronunciation: [sukiˈla], Yucatec Maya: "zacate (grass) water") is a municipality in the Mexican state of Yucatán containing 256.76 km^{2} (99.14 sq mi) of land and is located roughly 150 kilometres (93 mi) northeast of the city of Mérida.

== History ==
There is no accurate data on when the town was founded, but before the conquest, it was part of the chieftainship of Cupules. At colonization, Sucilá became part of the encomienda system and though an encomienda was established by the seventeenth century, no names were discovered before the encomendera Josefa Chacón y Salazar, who served in 1745.

Yucatán declared its independence from the Spanish Crown in 1821, and in 1825 the area was assigned to the Tizimín Municipality. In 1837, it was assigned to the Espita Municipality. As with other areas of the state, Sucilá was depopulated during the Caste War of Yucatán. In 1988, the area was confirmed as its own municipality.

== Governance ==
The municipal president is elected for a three-year term. The town council has four councilpersons, who serve as Secretary and councilors of public services, public security, urban development and ecology.

== Communities ==
The head of the municipality is Sucilá, Yucatán. The municipality has 63 populated places besides the seat including La Hacienda Xmabalam, San Antonio, San Pedro II, San Miguelito, San Román, Santa Rosa, Santa Teresa, Tierra Blanca, Xmihuan, and Yohches. The significant populations are shown below:

Community	Population
Entire Municipality (2010)	3,930
Sucilá	3645 in 2005

== Local festivals ==
Every year from 2 to 10 September there is a festival in honor of the Nativity of the Virgin Mary.

== Tourist attractions ==
- Church of Saint James the Apostle, built during the seventeenth century
- Cenote Dzibiak
- Cenote K' Aax' Eek
- Cenote San Pedro Iii
- Cenote Sukil-Ha
