= San Felipe Municipality, Yucatán =

Municipality in the Mexican state of Yucatán

San Felipe
- Municipality
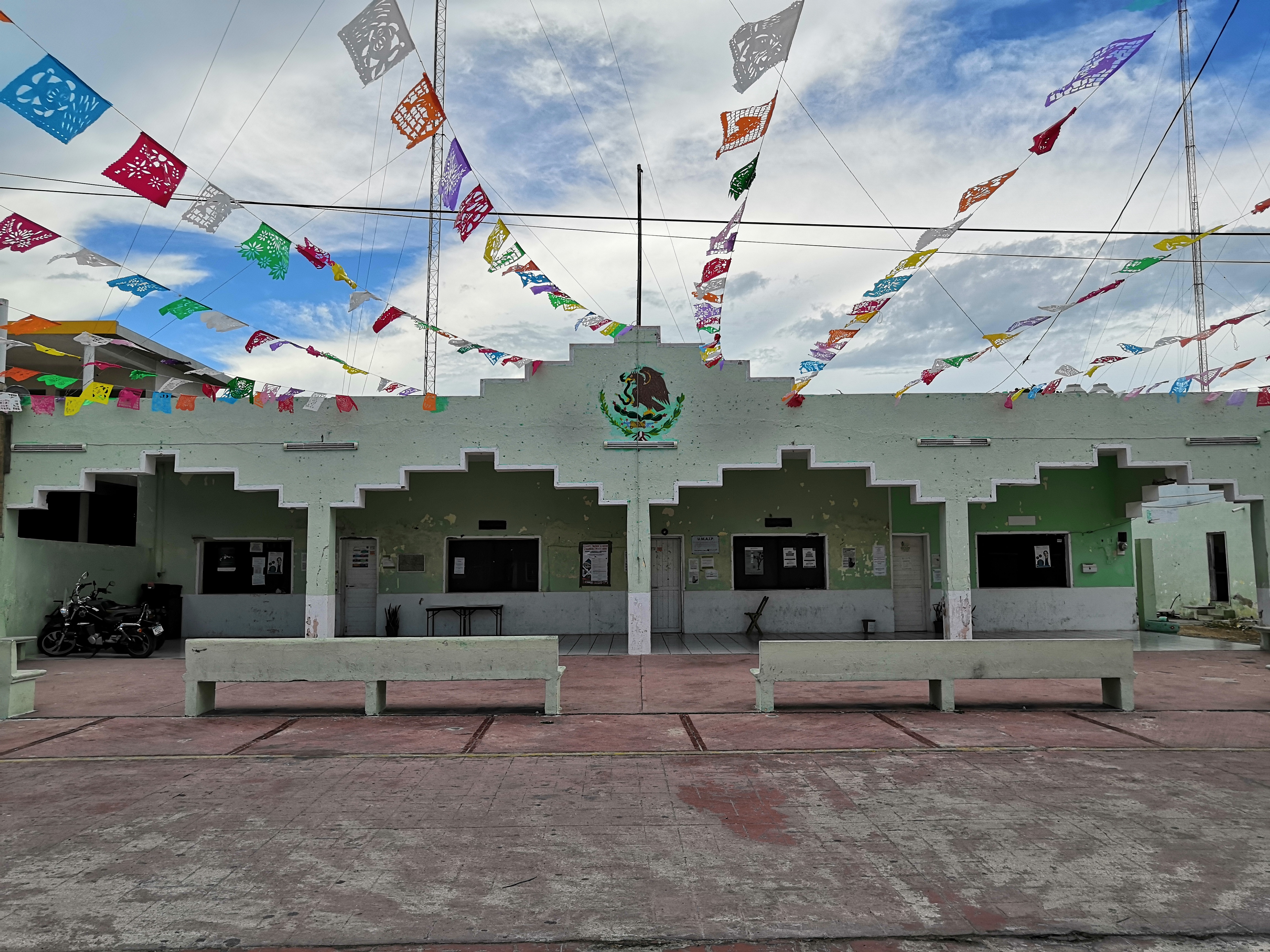

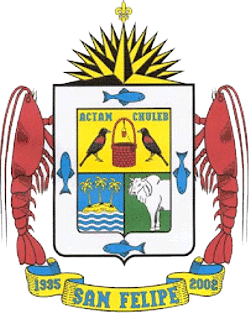
- Coat of arms

- Location of San Felipe in Yucatán

- Location of the Municipality in Mexico
- Coordinates: 21°34′N 88°13′W
- Country: Mexico
- State: Yucatán

Government
  - Type: 2007-2010
  - Municipal President: Gabriel Enrique Marrufo Marfil

Area
  - Total: 680.85 km^{2} (262.88 sq mi)
- Elevation: 2 m (6.6 ft)

Population (2005)
  - Total: 1,838
  - Density: 2.700/km^{2} (6.992/sq mi)
  - Demonym: Sanfelipeños
- Time zone: UTC-6 (Central Standard Time)
- Postal Code: 97616
- Area code: 986
- INEGI Code: 065
- Major Airport: Merida (Manuel Crescencio Rejón) International Airport
- IATA Code: MID
- ICAO Code: MMMD

San Felipe Municipality is a municipality in the Mexican state of Yucatán. Its municipal seat is located in the port town of San Felipe and is located on the north coast of the state, on the Gulf of Mexico. The port is primarily a fishing port, which in recent times has begun significant tourist activity.

== Geography ==
The port town of San Felipe is located 11 kilometers west of Rio Lagartos and at the entrance of the estuary of the Ría Lagartos Biosphere Reserve, world-famous for the concentrations of pink flamingoes. The San Felipe estuary runs parallel to the Gulf Coast to the port of El Cuyo. At its origin, most of the houses in San Felipe was built in cedar varnished so it could resist damage from moisture and salt from the coast, however a number of these buildings were destroyed by Hurricane Gilbert in 1988.

At present, San Felipe offers many services for ecotourism and adventure, accommodation, excursions by boat in the estuary to observe birds and beaches. The town is a good base for trips to Rio Lagartos.

== History ==
For some 200 years (approximately), a group of fishermen from a port in the west, perhaps Santa Clara or Dzilam Bravo, made a fishing trip. For some reason they decided to reach the beach. Some say that the reason was bad weather.

Upon reaching the beach, the men heard the song Chuleb, native birds of the area. They went to the birds and there found a freshwater spring, known here as the Actam Chuleb (Akta Chuleb the Yucatec Maya, in front or ahead of Chuleb). This spring is now a well located in the main park of the population.

The abundant fisheries then became possible after that the men return to the site, taking advantage of a temporary fishing camp, as they do today fishers beaches sanfelipense as Bachul or Chisascab.

By exploring the site found good land for farming and hunting, plus fishing and abundant fresh water, so some families have settled in the place. Initially these were from places like Dzidzantún, Dzilam and other places nearby.

With the good fishing area, people come from various places such as Panabá and Sucilá, among others. Panabá people, attracted by the abundant fishing, proximity to their farms or for the simple novelty of the new town, was installed at the port. In some cases these people went Panabá.

We do not know when, but sometime Actam Chuleb changed its name to San Felipe, in honor of San Felipe de Jesus.

Andalusia encouraged the people, the people grew up with immigrants from various parts. The port then had two streets forming a cross. To contact the people walking on the streets made of sand, were subsequently sascab, they grow and the population was small bridges crossing the ocaes (arms of water as small rivers which are among the mangroves) to reach other parts of the population. Moreover, much of what is now the jetty of the port was a beach.
