= X-Can =

- Town
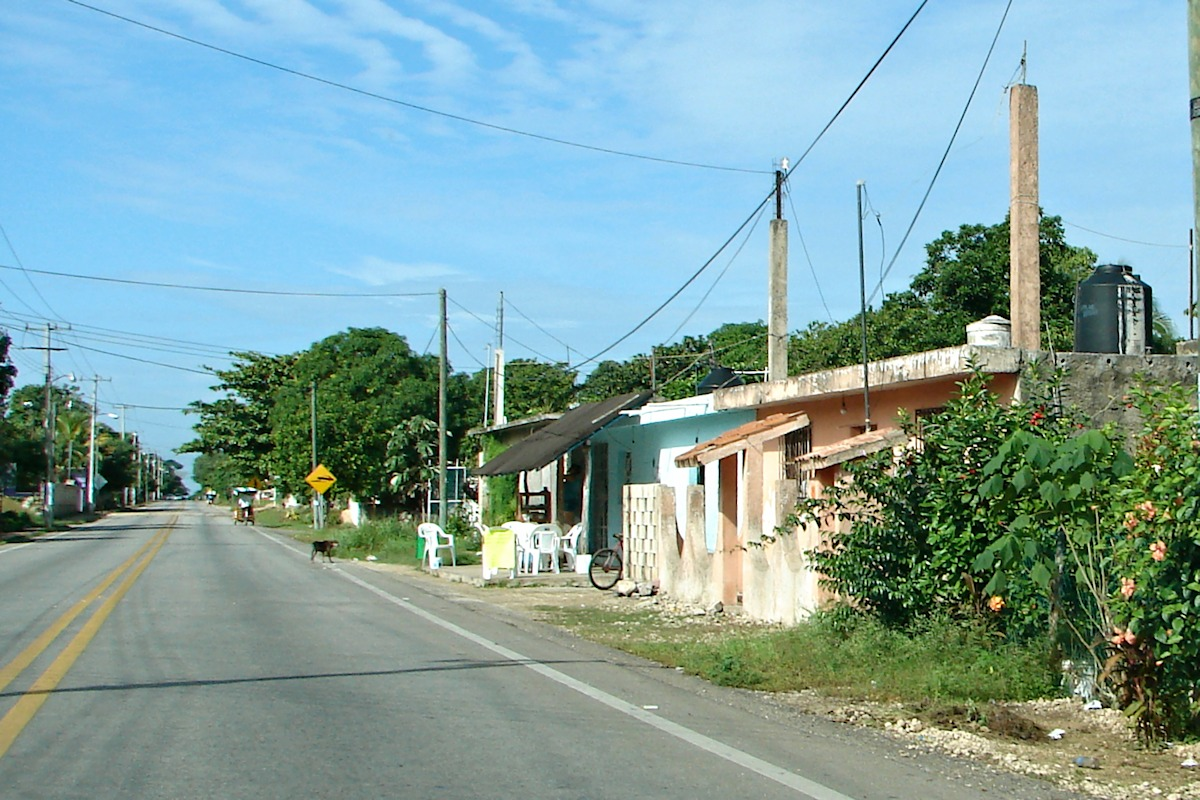

- Location within Yucatán (state)
- Coordinates: 20°51′30″N 87°40′05″W
- Country: Mexico
- State: Yucatán
- Municipality: Chemax
- Elevation: 25 m (82 ft)

Population (2010)
  - Total: 5,191
- Time zone: UTC-6 (Central Standard Time)
- Postal code (of seat): 97779
- Area code: 985
- INEGI code: 310190063

X-Can (Spanish pronunciation: [iʃˈkan]) is a town in the Chemax Municipality, Yucatán in Mexico. As of 2010, the town has a population of 5,191.

== Demographics ==
Historical population

Year	Pop.	±%
1940	194	—
1950	890	+358.8%
1960	1,600	+79.8%
1970	1,947	+21.7%
1980	1,847	−5.1%

Year	Pop.	±%
1990	3,003	+62.6%
1995	3,542	+17.9%
2000	3,904	+10.2%
2005	4,653	+19.2%
2010	5,191	+11.6%
