= Nacuche =

Nacuche, Yucatan
- Village
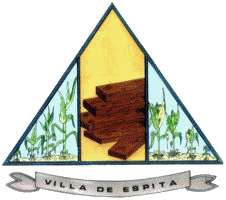
- Seal

- Location of Nacuche, Yucatan

- Nacuche street map
- Coordinates: 20°55′22″N 88°17′45″W
- Country: Mexico
- State: Yucatan
- Municipality: Espita Municipality
- Elevation: 29 m (95 ft)

Population (INEGI, 2005)
  - Total: 1,130
- Time zone: UTC-6 (Central (CST))
  - Summer (DST): UTC-5 (CDT)
- ZIP code: 97736
- Area code: 986
- INEGI Code: 310320004
- Website: www.espita.gob.mx

Nacuche is a village in Espita Municipality, Yucatan (Mexico) located on the Litoral Oriente (East Coast) or Region I of Yucatan. It has an average height of 29 meters. The population was 1,130 at the 2005 census made by the INEGI.

== Geography ==
Nacuche is located at 20°55′2″N 88°17′45″W (20.922778, -88.295833). According to the census data by the INEGI, the village has an average elevation of 29 meters above sea level.

=== Climate ===
The village has a climate of Aw1 (Köppen), warm humid, mean annual temperature over 22 °C and coldest month temperature over 18 °C. Precipitation of driest month less than 60 mm rainfall in summer and winter rainfall rate of 10.2% of the annual total.

== Demographics ==
Historical population
Year	Pop.	±%
1910	52	—
1921	149	+186.5%
1930	231	+55.0%
1940	230	−0.4%
1950	303	+31.7%
1960	290	−4.3%
1970	449	+54.8%
1980	522	+16.3%
1990	747	+43.1%
1995	825	+10.4%
2000	918	+11.3%
2005	1,130	+23.1%
Source: Archivo Histórico de Localidades

As of the census of 2005 made by the INEGI, there were 1,130 people (7.83% of the municipality), of which 589 were men and 541 women. In the village were 240 households.

== Education ==
Type	Students	Teachers	Schools
Preschool education	71	3	1
Primary education	242	9	2
Secondary education	142	15	1
Total	455	27	4
Source: Secretaría de Educación de Yucatán.

== See also ==
- Espita Municipality
- Yucatan
