= Las Coloradas, Yucatán =

Las Coloradas
- Town
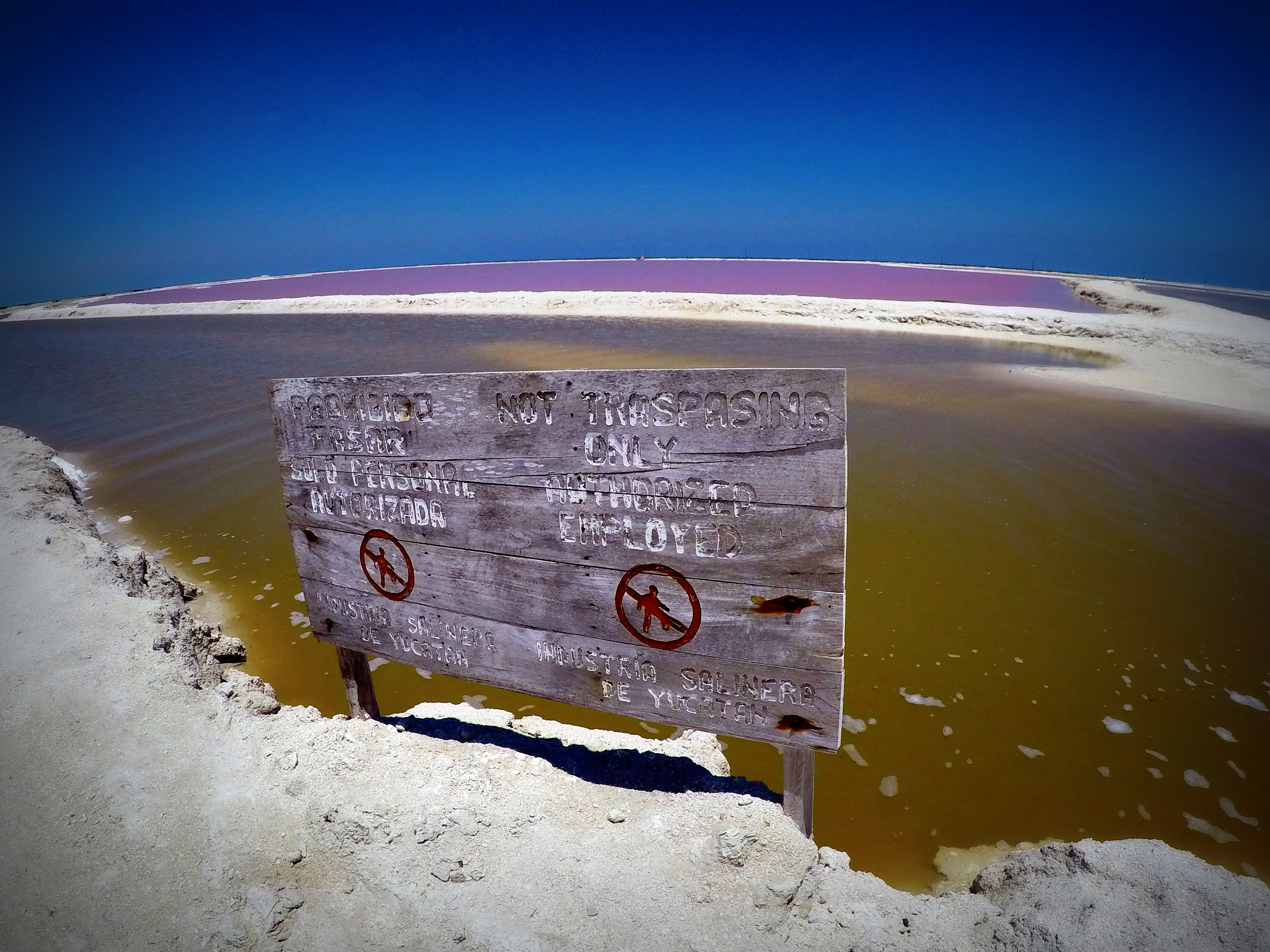
- Laguna Rosa close to Las Coloradas

- Location within Mexico
- Coordinates: 21°36′29″N 87°59′2″W
- Country: Mexico
- State: Yucatán
- Municipality: Rio Lagartos Municipality
- Time zone: UTC-5 (Southeast (US Eastern))

Las Coloradas is a community in the Rio Lagartos Municipality, Yucatán, Mexico. It is located at the northern coast of the Yucatan peninsula on a stretch of land which separates the Gulf of Mexico from the lagoon Ria Lagartos.

The area contains large salt evaporation ponds used for sea salt production. Some of the ponds are tinted pink by microorganisms, including the lagoon known as Laguna Rosa. The ponds lie near a biosphere reserve, and flamingos and other birds can be observed in the area. The pink lagoons have become a tourist attraction, a development attributed in part to photographs shared on Instagram. Tours can be arranged to see the resident flamingos and other birds, including a stop at the coloured lakes if requested.
