= Tizimín =

City in the Mexican state of Yucatán

- City
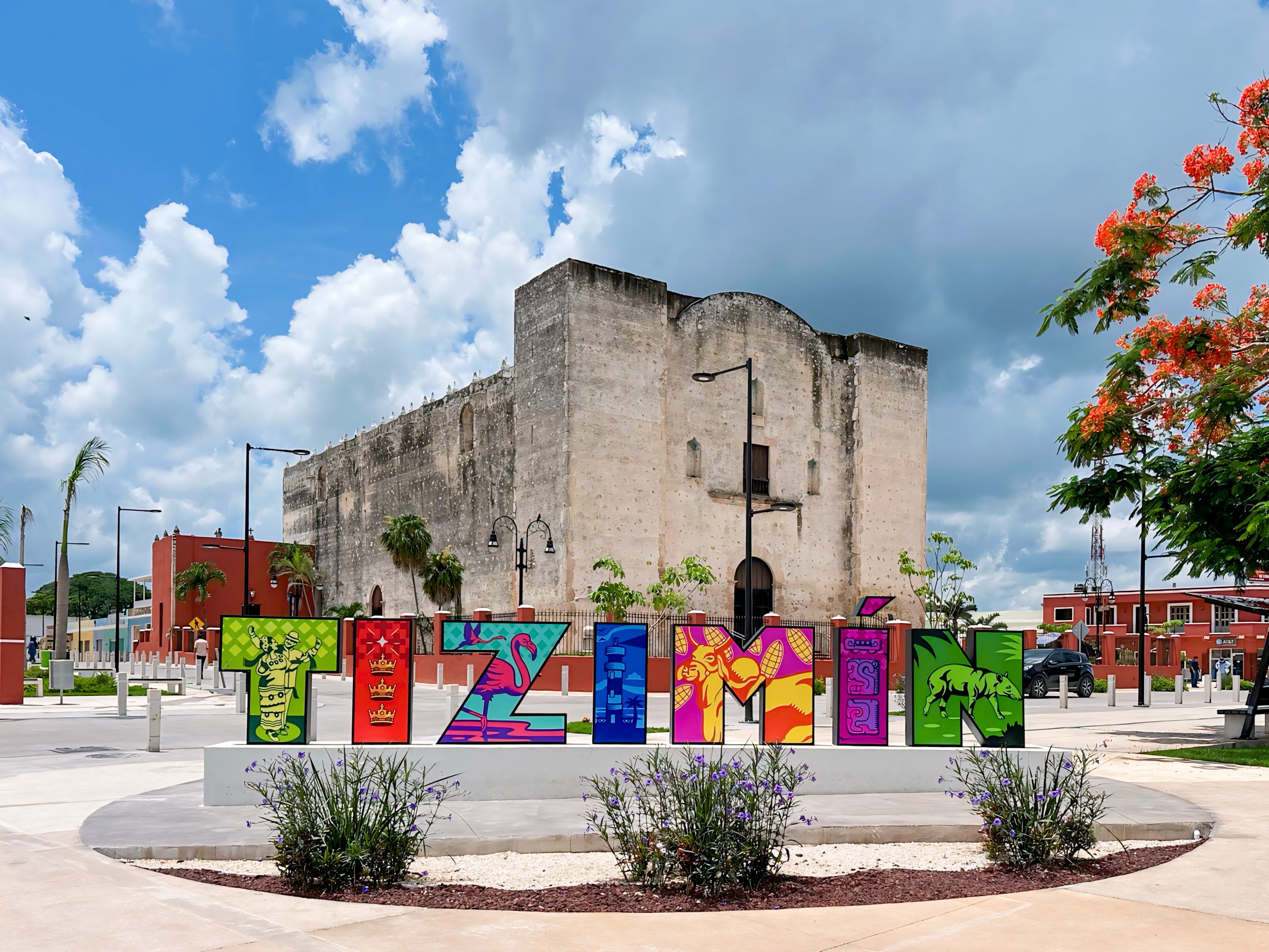
- Church of the Three Kings of Tizimín

- Coat of arms
- Motto: King's City
- Location within Yucatán (state) Location within Mexico
- Coordinates: 21°08′33″N 88°09′53″W
- Country: Mexico
- State: Yucatán
- Municipality: Tizimín Municipality

Government
  - Municipal president: José Dolores Mezo Peniche (PAN)
- Elevation: 20 m (66 ft)

Population (2010)
  - Total: 46,971
- Demonym: Tizimilean
- Postal Code: 97700
- Prefix: 986
- Website: tizimin.gob.mx

Tizimín is a city located in the Tizimín Municipality in the Mexican state of Yucatán. It is situated in the Coastal Zone of the same state.

It has an average elevation of 20 meters (66 ft) and is located 1,492 km (927 mi) from Mexico City, 167 km (104 mi) from the state capital city, Merida, Yucatan, 54 km (34 mi) from Rio Lagartos, 50 km (31 mi) from Valladolid, Yucatan, 36 km (22 mi) from Ek' Balam; and 27 km (17 mi) from Espita.

The city is known for its traditional fair celebrating the Biblical Magi, held in late December and early January. It is also a major Mexican handcraft market, offering rebozos, huipils, tablecloths, jewelry and guayaberas. This fair gives the city its nickname, "King's City".

In 2010, it was the second most populous city in eastern Yucatan, after Valladolid, Yucatán. It was also the third largest city and fourth most populous in the state overall. Currently, it is the leading producer of beef cattle in the state of Yucatan, and serves as the central urban service provider for the northeastern region of the state.

== Geography ==
=== Climate ===
Climate data for Tizimín
| Month | Jan | Feb | Mar | Apr | May | Jun | Jul | Aug | Sep | Oct | Nov | Dec | Year |
|---|---|---|---|---|---|---|---|---|---|---|---|---|---|
| Record high °C (°F) | 36.5 (97.7) | 38.0 (100.4) | 41.0 (105.8) | 41.0 (105.8) | 42.0 (107.6) | 40.0 (104.0) | 39.0 (102.2) | 39.5 (103.1) | 41.0 (105.8) | 39.3 (102.7) | 38.0 (100.4) | 35.6 (96.1) | 42.0 (107.6) |
| Mean daily maximum °C (°F) | 28.9 (84.0) | 30.3 (86.5) | 32.2 (90.0) | 34.2 (93.6) | 35.2 (95.4) | 33.8 (92.8) | 33.5 (92.3) | 33.8 (92.8) | 32.9 (91.2) | 31.2 (88.2) | 30.2 (86.4) | 28.9 (84.0) | 32.1 (89.8) |
| Daily mean °C (°F) | 21.9 (71.4) | 22.8 (73.0) | 24.5 (76.1) | 26.2 (79.2) | 27.8 (82.0) | 27.5 (81.5) | 27.1 (80.8) | 27.3 (81.1) | 26.7 (80.1) | 25.3 (77.5) | 23.9 (75.0) | 22.2 (72.0) | 25.3 (77.5) |
| Mean daily minimum °C (°F) | 15.0 (59.0) | 15.2 (59.4) | 16.7 (62.1) | 18.3 (64.9) | 20.4 (68.7) | 21.1 (70.0) | 20.8 (69.4) | 20.8 (69.4) | 20.6 (69.1) | 19.4 (66.9) | 17.7 (63.9) | 15.5 (59.9) | 18.5 (65.3) |
| Record low °C (°F) | 4.0 (39.2) | 4.0 (39.2) | 5.7 (42.3) | 6.5 (43.7) | 13.5 (56.3) | 15.0 (59.0) | 15.5 (59.9) | 17.0 (62.6) | 17.0 (62.6) | 10.0 (50.0) | 7.0 (44.6) | 4.8 (40.6) | 4.0 (39.2) |
| Average precipitation mm (inches) | 49.4 (1.94) | 41.2 (1.62) | 45.7 (1.80) | 59.1 (2.33) | 111.6 (4.39) | 153.1 (6.03) | 210.4 (8.28) | 168.5 (6.63) | 216.5 (8.52) | 127.9 (5.04) | 52.9 (2.08) | 57.4 (2.26) | 1,293.7 (50.93) |
| Average precipitation days (≥ 0.1 mm) | 4.5 | 4.1 | 3.1 | 2.9 | 7.0 | 12.1 | 14.1 | 13.7 | 14.8 | 10.2 | 5.7 | 4.3 | 96.5 |
Source: Servicio Meteorologico Nacional

== Sister city ==
Tizimín has one sister city since 2011, the city is Evansville, Indiana in the United States.

| City | Location | Country | Establishment |
|---|---|---|---|
| Evansville | Vanderburgh County, Indiana | USA | 2011 |

== Transportation ==
The city is served by the Cupul National Airport (IATA: TZM).

== See also ==
- Tizimín Municipality
- Evansville, Indiana
- Yucatán (state)
