= Chemax =

Town in the Mexican state of Yucatán

Coordinates: 20°39′18″N 87°56′14″W

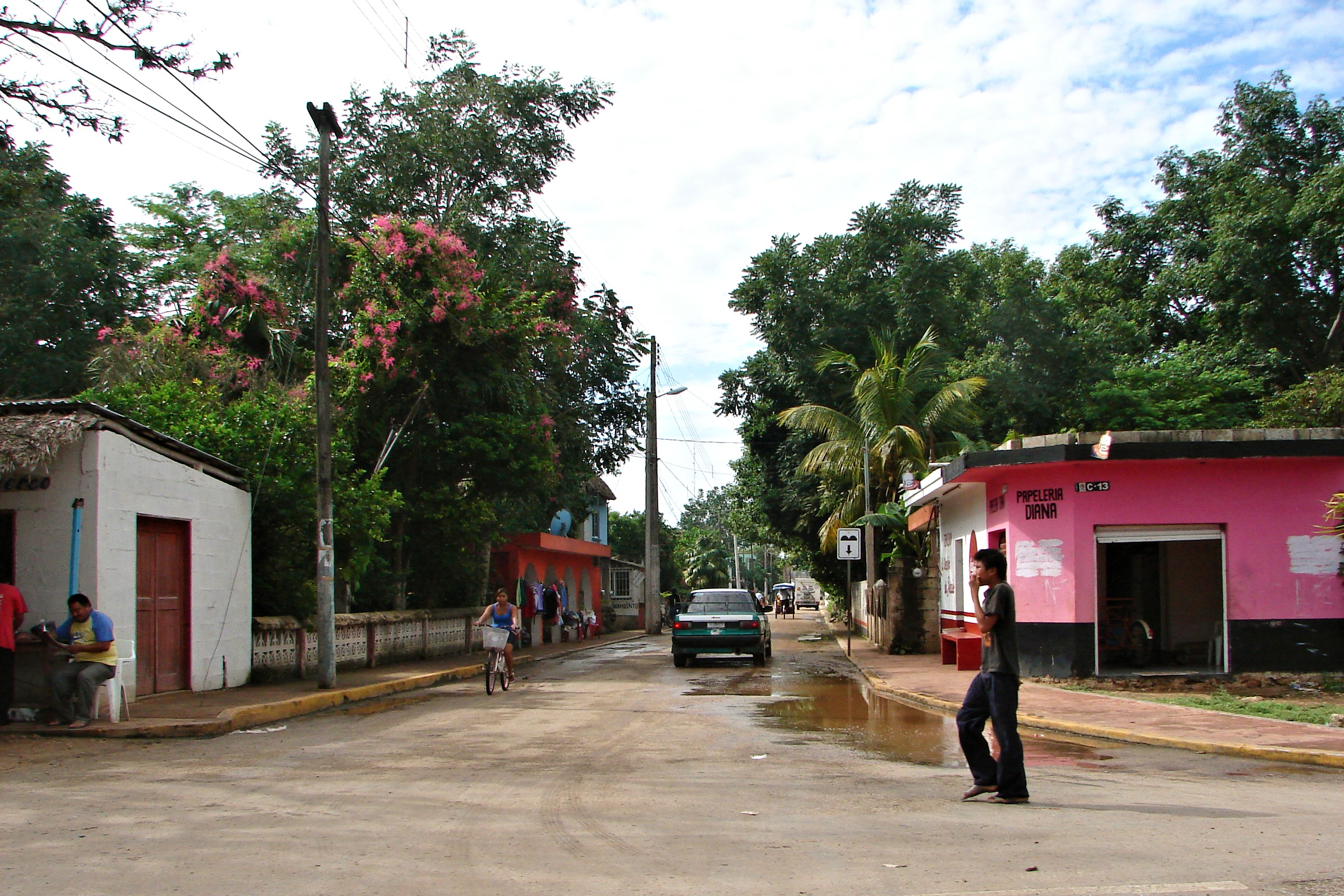
Chemax

Chemax, the Mayan word meaning "tree of monkeys", is a town located in the east of Yucatán State, Mexico. It is from 1918, the head of Chemax Municipality.
