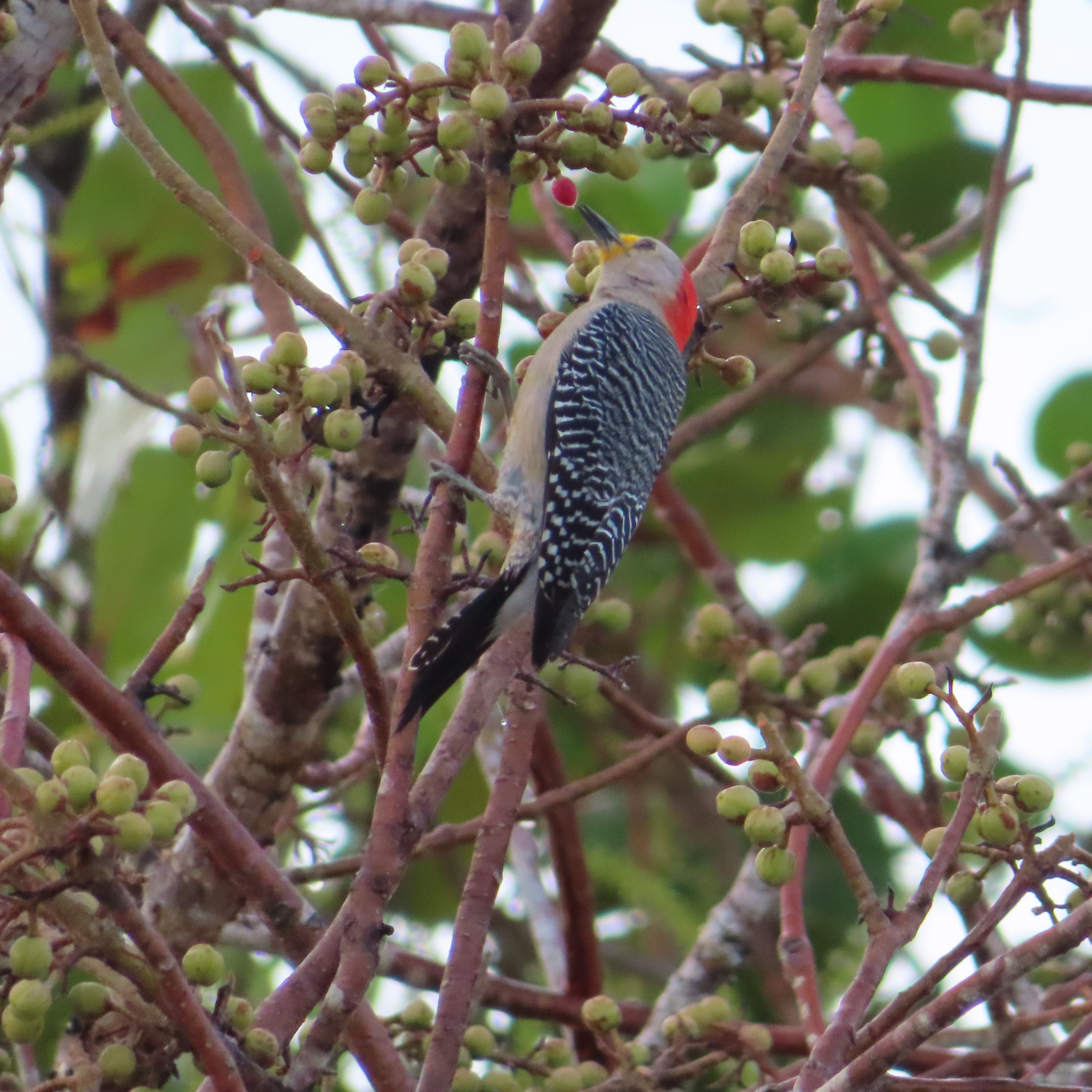
- Adult, eating the fruit of a jocote tree in Celestún, Yucatán, Mexico

Conservation status
- Least Concern (IUCN 3.1)

Scientific classification
- Kingdom: Animalia
- Phylum: Chordata
- Class: Aves
- Order: Piciformes
- Family: Picidae
- Genus: Melanerpes
- Species: M. pygmaeus

Binomial name
- Melanerpes pygmaeus (Ridgway, 1885)

Synonyms
- Centurus pygmaeus

= Yucatan woodpecker =

Species of bird

The Yucatan woodpecker (Melanerpes pygmaeus) is a species of bird in the family Picidae. It is sometimes referred to as the red-vented woodpecker. The Yucatan woodpecker is found in Belize and Mexico, and ranges over the entire Yucatán Peninsula. Its natural habitats are subtropical or tropical dry forests, subtropical or tropical dry shrubland, and heavily degraded former forest.

== Description ==
The adult Yucatan woodpecker is 17 cm (6.7 in) in length. Adults are mainly light gray on the face and underparts; they have black and white barred patterns on their back, wings and tail. Adult males have a red cap going from the eye to the nape, whereas the red cap is only in the occipital area in the females. There are yellow feathers around the base of the bill. There may be a yellowish tinge to the belly and a red wash to the vent area.

The plumage of the Yucatan woodpecker is very similar in appearance to that of the golden-fronted woodpecker (Melanerpes aurifrons), which is also found throughout the entire Yucatán Peninsula. It can be very difficult to distinguish between these two species in the field. The golden-fronted woodpecker — which is much more common than the Yucatan woodpecker — has a larger body and a longer beak, and the female has more red on the nape of the neck than that of the Yucatan woodpecker. The golden-fronted woodpecker also has reddish feathers at the base of the bill, whereas the Yucatan Woodpecker has yellow feathers surrounding the base of the bill. The barring pattern on the back of the golden-fronted woodpecker is such that it has a blackish appearance from a distance, whereas that of the Yucatan woodpecker has a silvery appearance from a distance. Finally, the vocalization of the Yucatan woodpecker is also quite different from that of the golden-fronted woodpecker.

Although the Yucatan woodpecker is also very similar in appearance to the red-crowned woodpecker (Melanerpes rubricapillus), the distribution of these two species does not overlap.

== Subspecies ==
The Yucatan woodpecker has 3 subspecies:

- M. p. pygmaeus (Ridgway, 1885): Cozumel.
- M. p. rubricomus (Peters, JL, 1948): Yucatán Peninsula south to central Belize.
- M. p. tysoni (Bond, 1936): Guanaja I. (off northern Honduras).

== Distribution and habitat ==
The Yucatan woodpecker is endemic to Central America. Its range includes the Yucatán Peninsula and adjoining offshore islands, Cozumel Island, Belize, northeastern Guatemala and Guanaja Island off the coast of Honduras. It is mostly found in clearings and near the edges of dry woodland and in coastal scrub, but also sometimes inhabits damper woodland and degraded habitats.

== Status ==
The population of the Yucatan woodpecker is believed to be stable and its range is large. For these reasons, the International Union for Conservation of Nature has assessed its conservation status as being of "least concern".

== Gallery ==
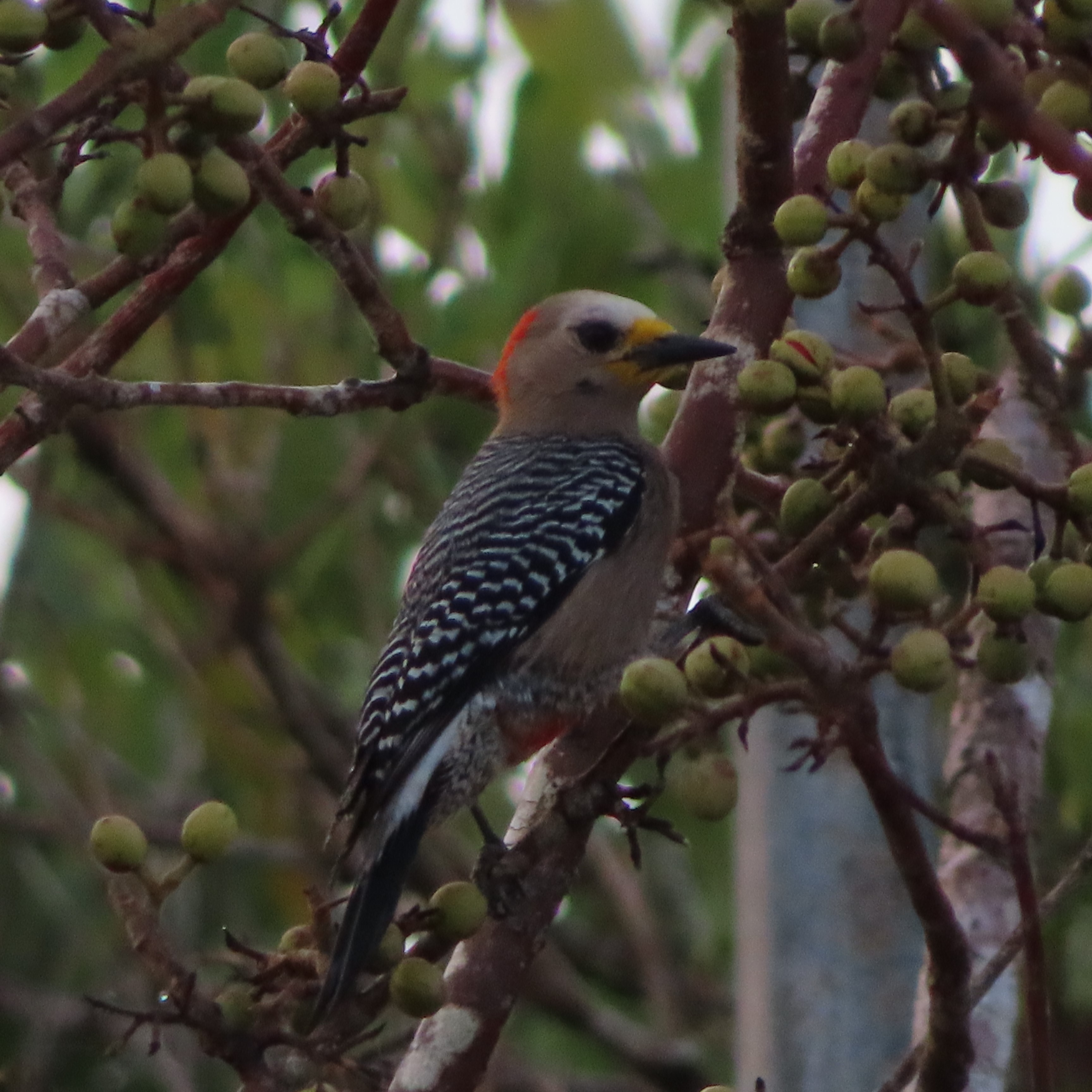
Female

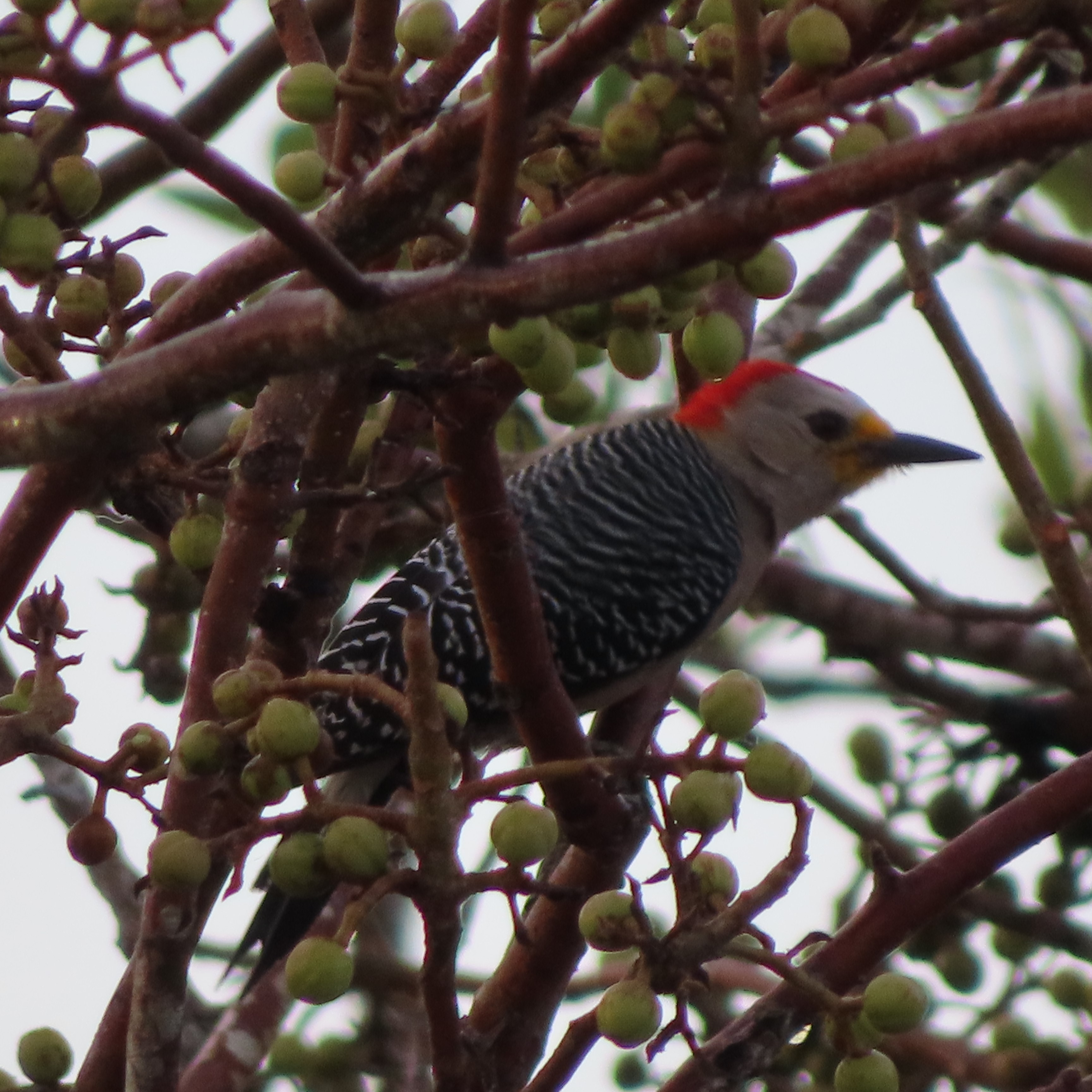
Male

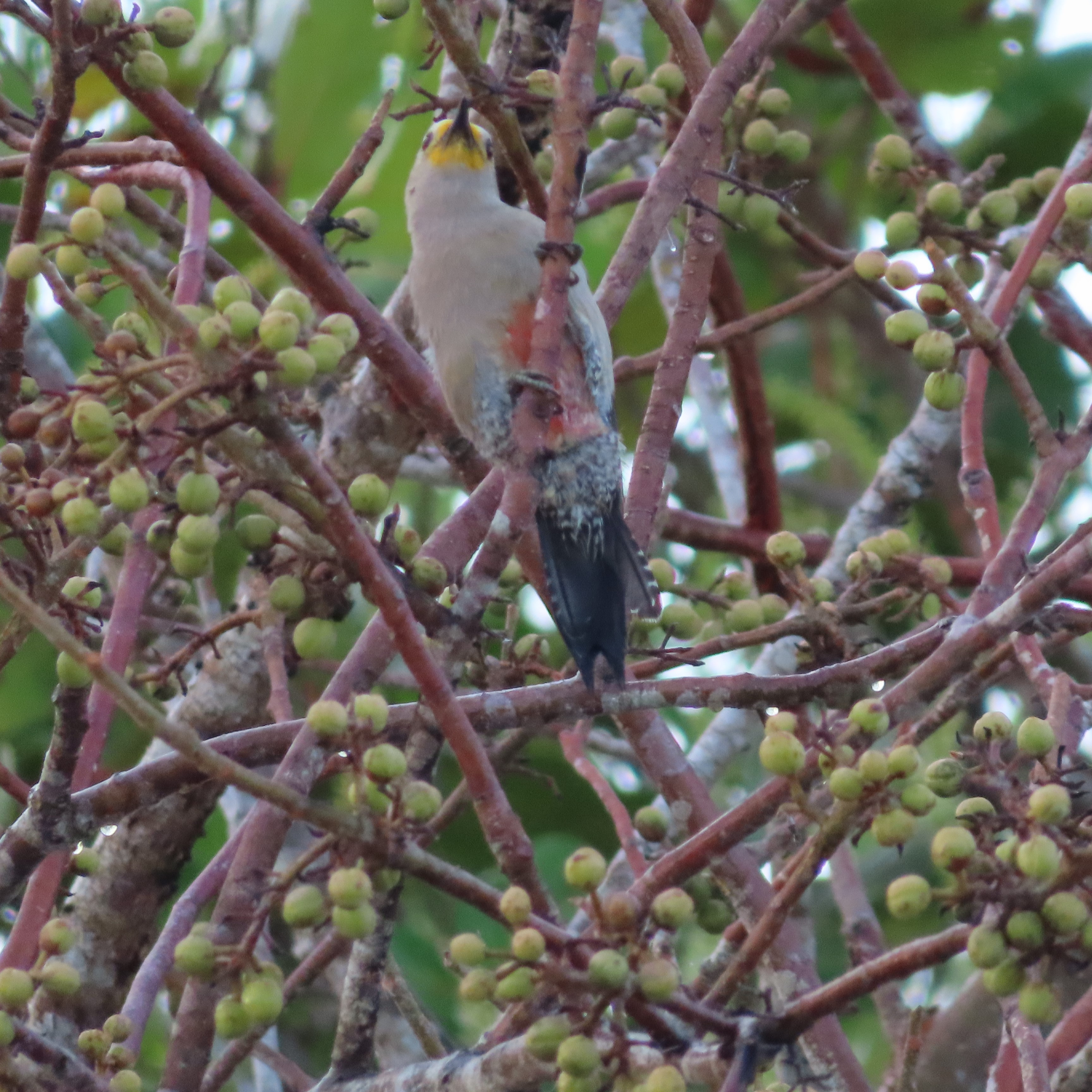
The vent area can be seen in this view. This species is sometimes referred to as the "red-vented woodpecker".
