= Dzilam de Bravo Municipality =

Municipality in the Mexican state of Yucatán

Dzilam de Bravo
- Municipality
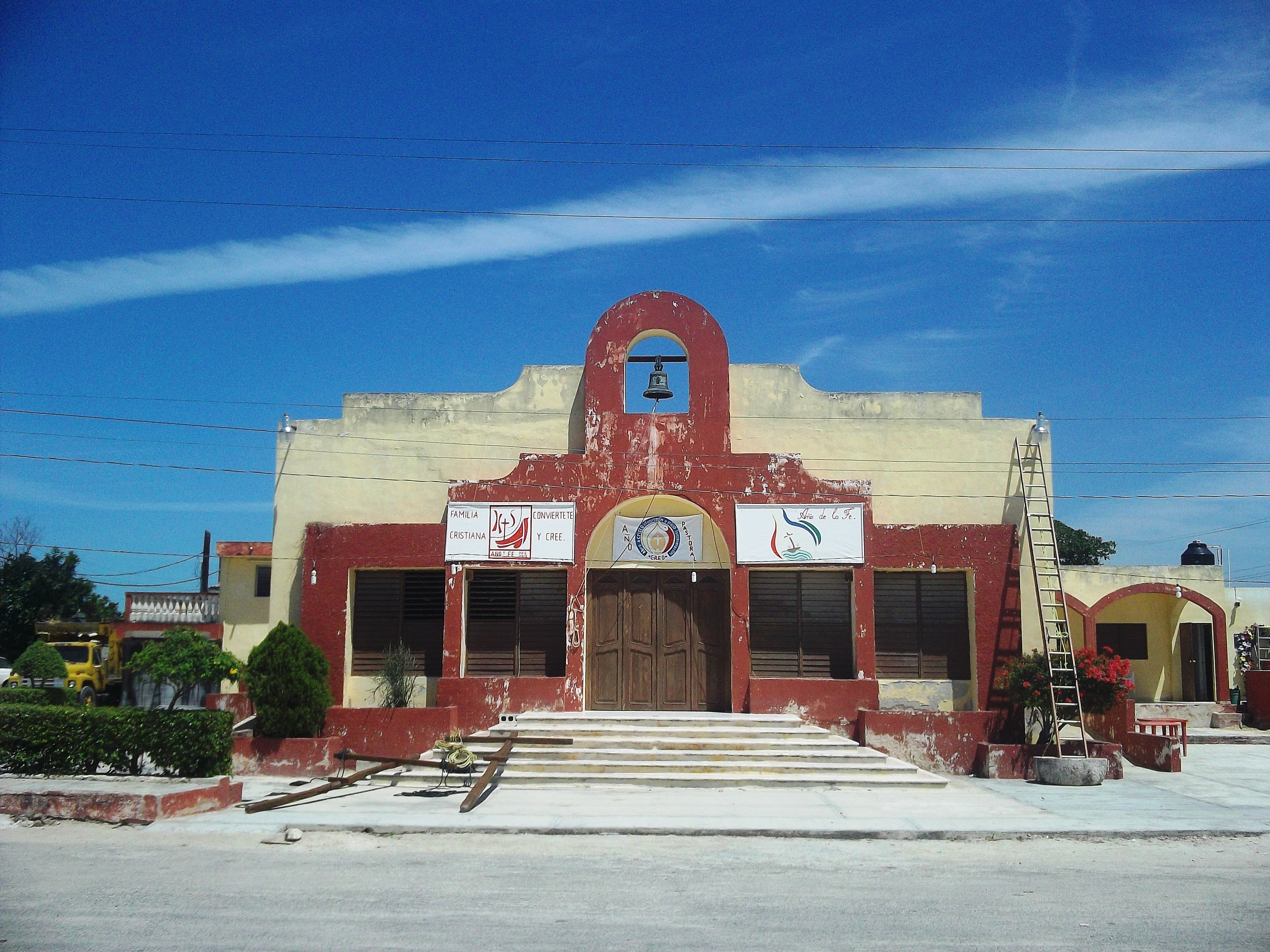
- Principal Church of Dzilam de Bravo, Yucatán

- Municipalities of Yucatán by Region: Region 4 Litoral centro #028

- Location of the Municipality in Mexico
- Coordinates: 21°23′33″N 88°53′29″W
- Country: Mexico
- State: Yucatán

Government
  - Type: 2012–2015
  - Municipal President: Pedro Jesús Castillo Reyes

Area
  - Total: 241.43 km^{2} (93.22 sq mi)
- Elevation: 2 m (6.6 ft)

Population (2010)
  - Total: 2,463
- Time zone: UTC-6 (Central Standard Time)
- INEGI Code: 009
- Major Airport: Merida (Manuel Crescencio Rejón) International Airport
- IATA Code: MID
- ICAO Code: MMMD

Dzilam de Bravo Municipality (In the Yucatec Maya Language: "fierce peeling") is a municipality in the Mexican state of Yucatán containing 241.43 km^{2} of land and located roughly 107 km northeast of the city of Mérida.

== History ==
During pre-Hispanic times, the town fell within the provinces under the chieftainship of Cheles. After the conquest the area became part of the encomienda system. In 1544 Francisco de Montejo established a town at the site.

Yucatán declared its independence from the Spanish Crown in 1821 and in 1825, the area was assigned to the Coastal region with its headquarters in Izamal. From 1900 to 1921 Dzilam de Bravo was a part of the Dzilam González Municipality. In 1921 it was separated to form its own municipality.

== Governance ==
The municipal president is elected for a three-year term. The town council has four councilpersons, who serve as Secretary and councilors of public works and public planning and beautification.

The Municipal Council administers the business of the municipality. It is responsible for budgeting and expenditures and producing all required reports for all branches of the municipal administration. Annually it determines educational standards for schools.

The Police Commissioners ensure public order and safety. They are tasked with enforcing regulations, distributing materials and administering rulings of general compliance issued by the council.

== Communities ==
The head of the municipality is Dzilam de Bravo, Yucatán. The other populated areas include El Cerrito, Espoquin Chico, Noh-Yaxché, Pueblo Nuevo, San Alfredo, San José, X-tabán and Yalcubul. The significant populations are shown below:

Community	Population
Entire Municipality (2010)	2,463
Dzilam de Bravo	2188 in 2005
Pueblo Nuevo	33 in 2005

== Local festivals ==
Every year from the 10 to 13 June they celebrate the festival in honor of San Antonio de Padua, patron saint of the town.

== Tourist attractions ==
- Church of San Antonio de Padua built in the 16th century
- Church of the Immaculate Conception built in the 16th century
- Church of St. Peter built in the 17th century
- Cenote Elepetén
- Bolmay archaeological site
- Palaban archaeological site
- Petul archaeological site
- Poxil archaeological site
- Sotpol archaeological site
- Tamba archaeological site
- Xalau archaeological site
- Xcan archaeological site
- Xcoom archaeological site
- Xmaos archaeological site
- Xuyap archaeological site
- Parque San Felipe
