= Dzilam González Municipality =

Municipality in the Mexican state of Yucatán

Dzilam González
- Municipality
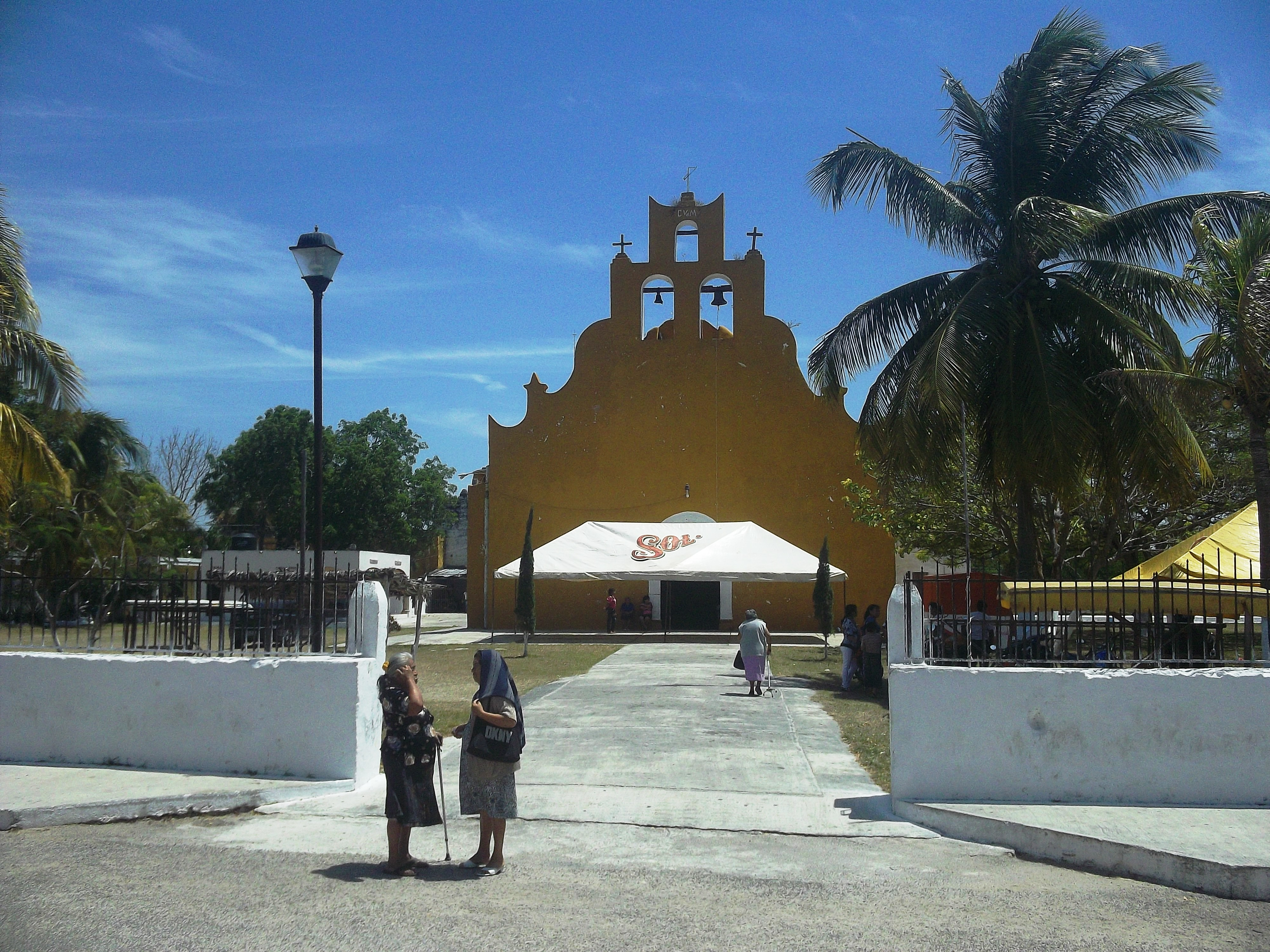
- Principal Church of Dzilam González, Yucatán

- Municipal location in Yucatán

- Location of the Municipality in Mexico
- Coordinates: 21°16′48″N 88°55′45″W
- Country: Mexico
- State: Yucatán

Government
  - Type: 2012–2015
  - Municipal President: Edwi Roberto Martin Segura

Area
  - Total: 545.45 km^{2} (210.60 sq mi)
- Elevation: 3 m (9.8 ft)

Population (2010)
  - Total: 5,905
- Time zone: UTC-6 (Central Standard Time)
- INEGI Code: 029
- Major Airport: Merida (Manuel Crescencio Rejón) International Airport
- IATA Code: MID
- ICAO Code: MMMD

Dzilam González Municipality (In the Yucatec Maya Language: "peeling" combined with the Spanish surname "González") is a municipality in the Mexican state of Yucatán containing 545.45 square kilometres (210.60 sq mi) of land and located roughly 90 kilometres (56 mi) northeast of the city of Mérida. It is located in the former Province of Ah Kin Chel Province to the north of Izamal, about 10 kilometres (6.2 mi) inland from the coast. It was once the port of Dzilam which has now receded inland is known as Dzilam González. The agricultural produces of the area are corn, onions, beans and fruit.

== History ==
During pre-Hispanic times, the town fell within the provinces under the chieftainship of Cheles. After the conquest the area became part of the encomienda system. In 1544 Francisco de Montejo established a town at the site.

Yucatán declared its independence from the Spanish Crown in 1821 and in 1825, the area was assigned to the Coastal region with its headquarters in Izamal. In 1825, "González" was appended to the name to differentiate this place from a port with the same name. In 1900 it was separated to form its own municipality, which included the area that is now Dzilam de Bravo Municipality until 1921, when that was separated.

Some years back there were extensive ruins here but now there are two Mayan ruins.

== Governance ==
The municipal president is elected for a three-year term. The town council has seven councilpersons, who serve as Secretary and councilors of sports, public services, heritage, public security, cemeteries and public works.

The Municipal Council administers the business of the municipality. It is responsible for budgeting and expenditures and producing all required reports for all branches of the municipal administration. Annually it determines educational standards for schools.

The Police Commissioners ensure public order and safety. They are tasked with enforcing regulations, distributing materials and administering rulings of general compliance issued by the council.

== Communities ==
The head of the municipality is Dzilam González, Yucatán. There are 72 populated locations in the municipality. The larger populated areas include Hacienda Escalante, Eugenio Zapata and San Román. The significant populations are shown below:

Community	Population
Entire Municipality (2010)	5,905
Dzilam González	5798 in 2005

== Local festivals ==
Every year from the 10 to 13 June they celebrate the festival in honor of San Antonio de Padua, patron saint of the town.

== Tourist attractions ==
- Cenote Ayim
- Cenote Chen Cimen
- Cenote Labom

== Bibliography ==
- Ellis, Allen R.; Ellis, Phyllis T. (1964). Discovering Mayaland: A Detailed Guide to the State of Yucatan for the Traveler and Sportsman. A.H. Clark Company.
