= Chemax Municipality =

Municipality in the Mexican state of Yucatán

Chemax
- Municipality
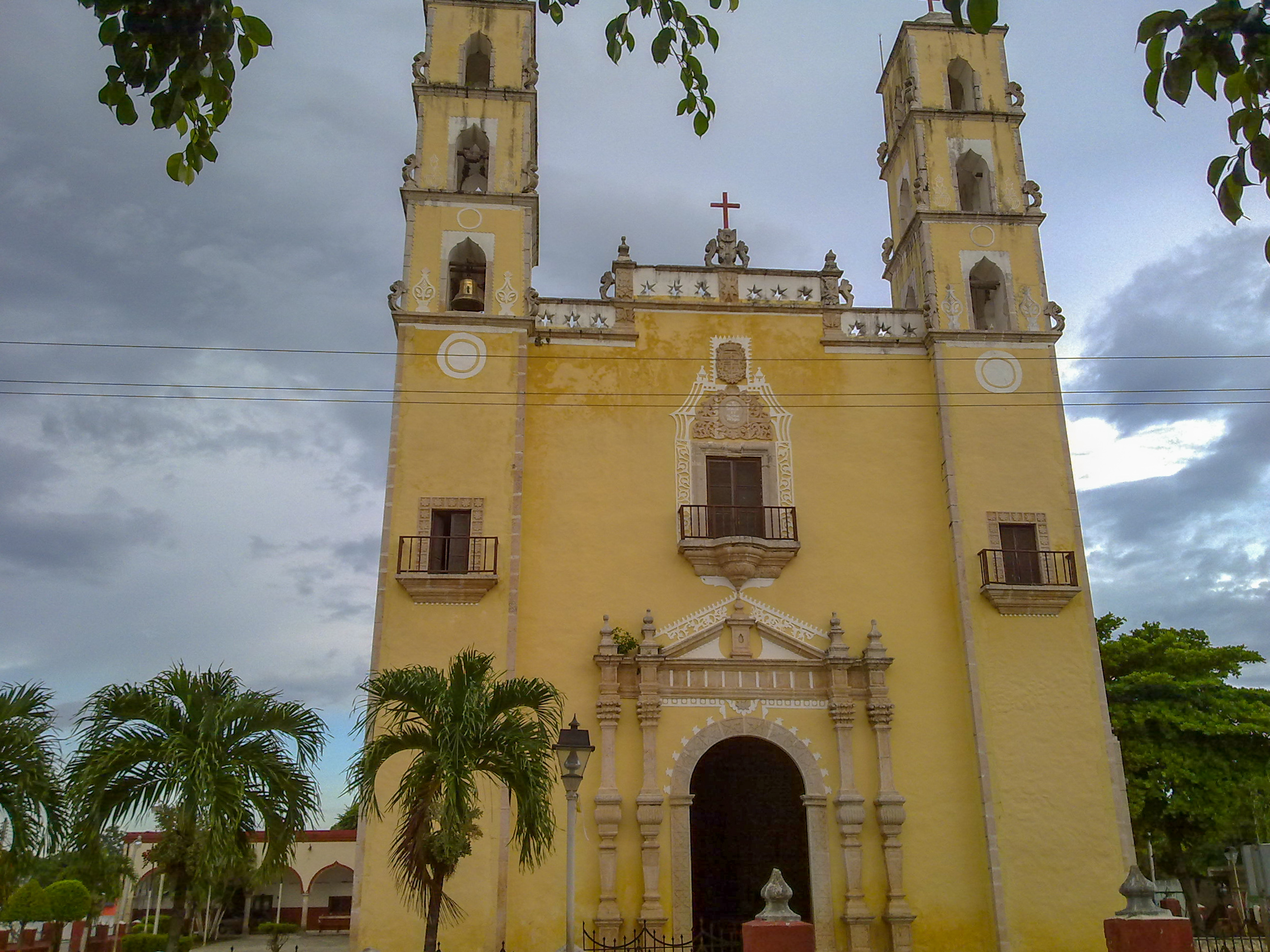
- Principal Church of Chemax

- Coat of arms

- Region 6 Oriente #019

- Location of the Municipality in Mexico
- Coordinates: 20°35′00″N 87°33′00″W
- Country: Mexico
- State: Yucatán
- Mexico Ind.: 1821
- Yucatán Est.: 1824
- Municipal seat: Chemax

Government
  - Type: 2012–2015
  - Municipal President: Lucio Balam Herrera

Area
  - Total: 1,098.6 km^{2} (424.2 sq mi)
- Elevation: 26 m (85 ft)

Population (2010)
  - Total: 33,490
- Demonym: Chemaxeño
- Time zone: UTC-6 (Central Standard Time)
- INEGI Code: 019

Chemax Municipality (Yucatec Maya: [tʃeˈmaʃ], “monkey's tree”) is a municipality in the Mexican state of Yucatán containing 1,098.6 km^{2} of land and located roughly 185 km east of the city of Mérida.

== History ==
There is no accurate data on when the town was founded, though it existed before the conquest as part of the province of Cupules. At colonization, Chemax became part of the encomienda system with the first encomendero noted in 1549 as Juan López de Mena.

Yucatán declared its independence from the Spanish Crown in 1821 and during the Caste War of Yucatán the city was abandoned but repopulated after federal troops regained possession of it. In 1865, the area was assigned to the partition of Valladolid Municipality. In 1918, it was designated as its own municipality.

== Governance ==
The municipal president is elected for a three-year term. The town council has nine councilpersons, who serve as Secretary and councilors of public works, public lighting, police commissaries, public security, public monuments, nomenclature, ecology, and public sanitation.

== Communities ==
The head of the municipality is Chemax, Yucatán. There are 170 populated areas of the municipality with the most important locations being: Además, Catzim, Chemax, Chen, Cocoyol, Kuxeb, Lolbé, Mucel, Punta Laguna, San Juan, San Pedro, Santa Cruz, Santa Elena, Sisbichén, Uspibil, Xalaú, X-Can, X-mab, X-maben, Xochmil, X-tejas and Xuneb. The significant populations are shown below:

Community	Population
Entire Municipality (2010)	33,490
Chechmil	478 in 2005
Chemax	12764 in 2005
Chulután	466 in 2005
Cocoyol	522 in 2005
Kuxeb	642 in 2005
Mucel	900 in 2005
Sisbichen	1566 in 2005
Uspibil	764 in 2005
Xalau	1813 in 2005
X-Can	4653 in 2005
X-Catzin	1757 in 2005

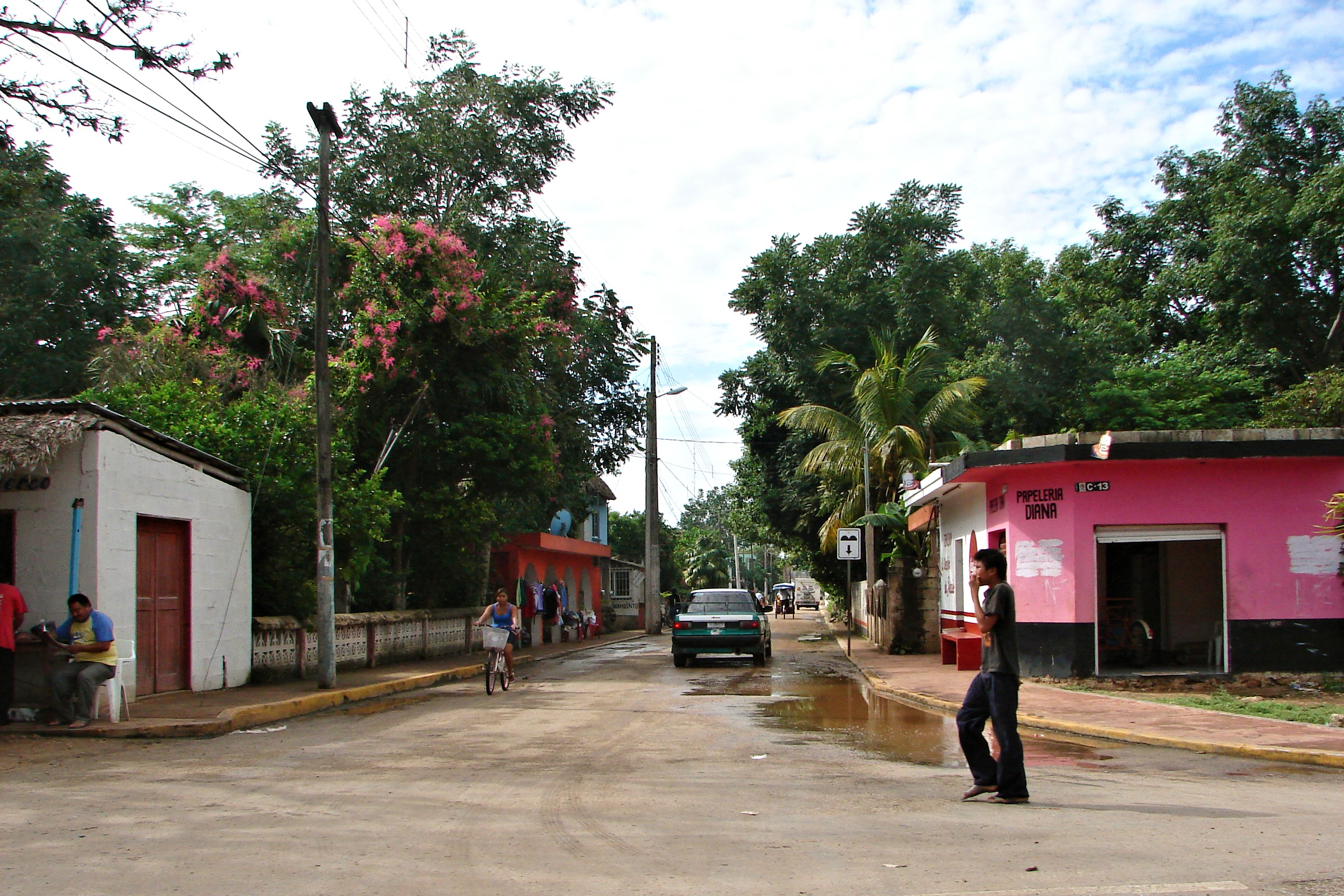
Chemax

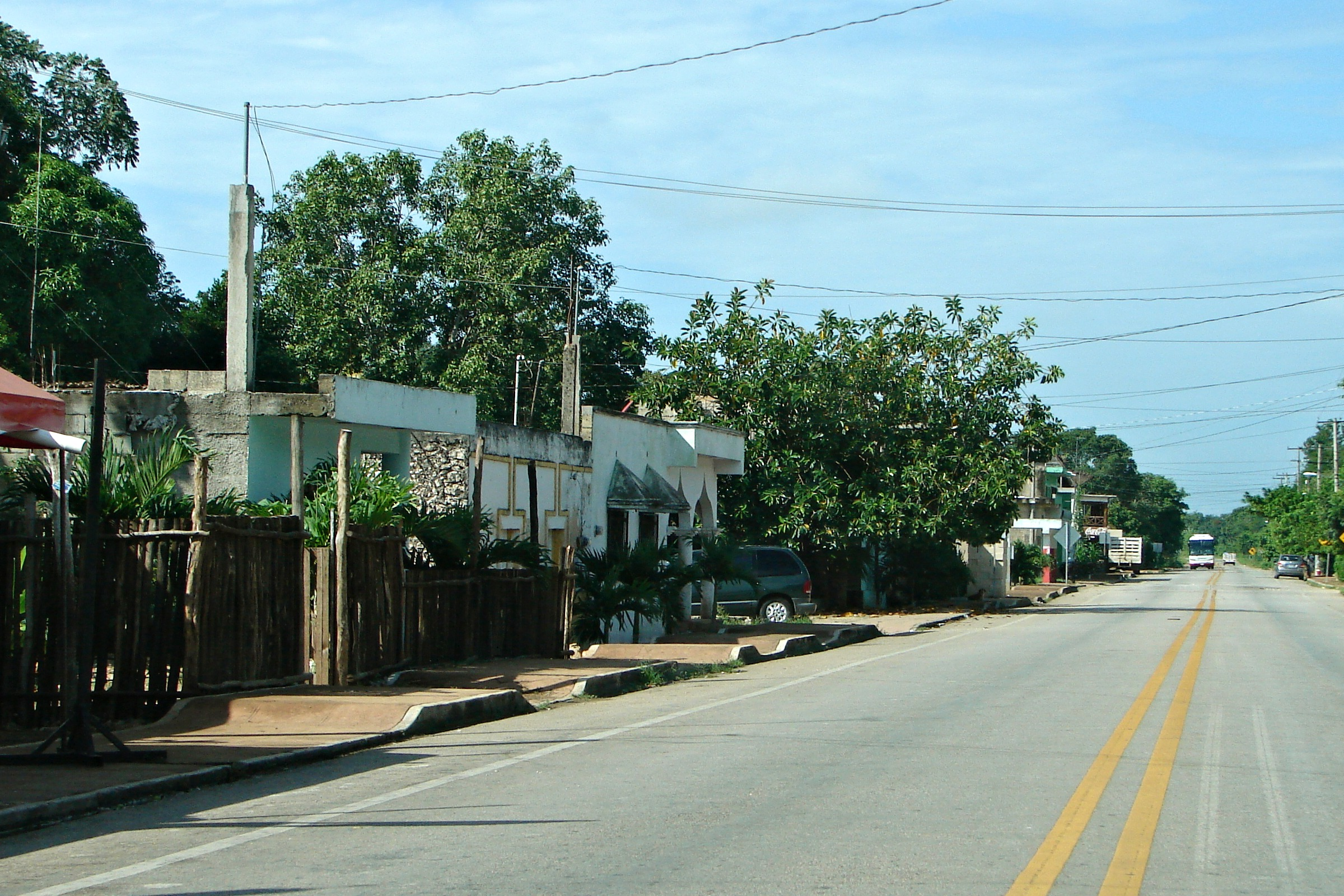
Catzin

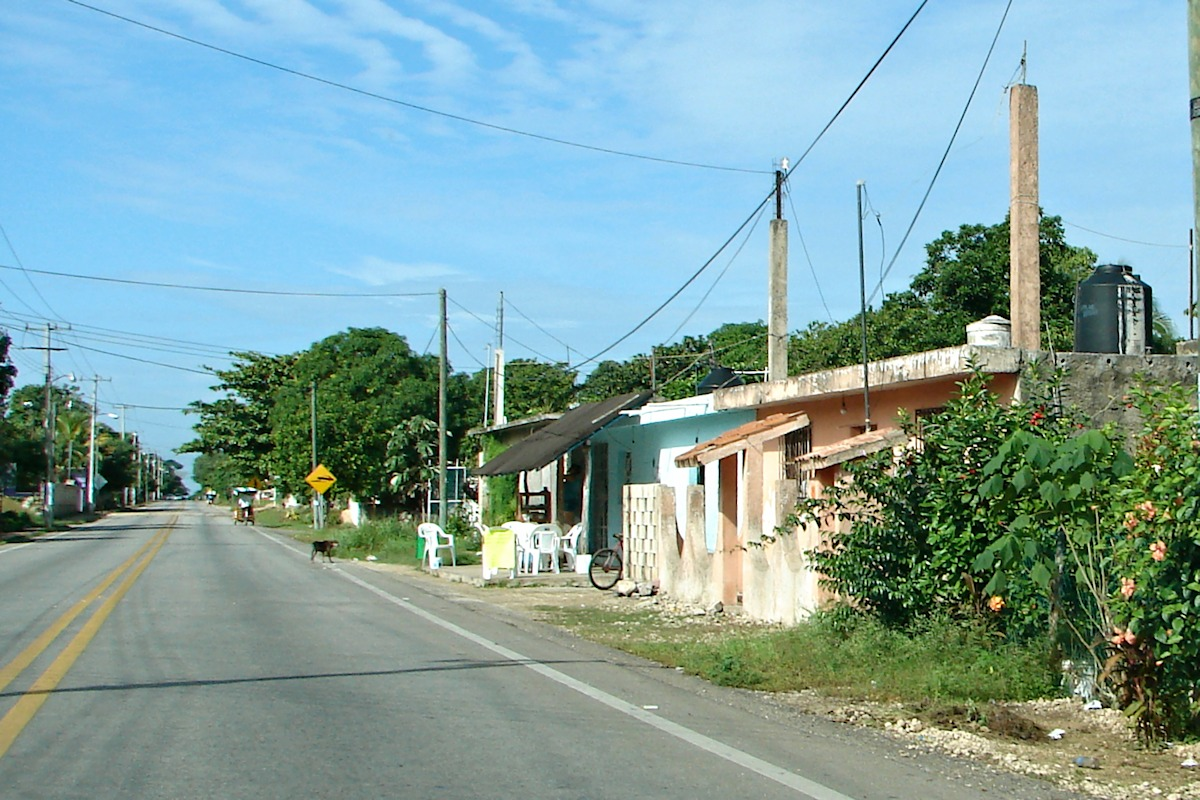
X-Can

== Local festivals ==
- From 10 to 13 June, festival in honor of San Antonio de Padua, patron saint of the town of Chemax.

== Tourist attractions ==
- Churches of San Antonio de Padua, built in the sixteenth century
- Church of La Purísima Concepción, built in the seventeenth century
- Church of San Pedro, built in the seventeenth century
- Archaeological sites at Bolmay, Palaban, Petul, Poxil, Sotpol, Tamba, Xalau, Xcan, Xcoom, Xmaos and Xuyap
- Cenotes at Abli, Aktun Eek, Aktun Teel, Aktun Uspibil and Alamo I

== Climate ==
Considered a tropical savanna climate typically with a pronounced dry season. The Köppen Climate Classification subtype for this climate is Aw (Tropical Savanna Climate).

Climate data for Chemax
Month	Jan	Feb	Mar	Apr	May	Jun	Jul	Aug	Sep	Oct	Nov	Dec	Year
Mean daily maximum °C (°F)	31 (87)	31 (88)	33 (91)	34 (94)	36 (96)	35 (95)	34 (94)	34 (94)	33 (92)	33 (91)	32 (89)	31 (88)	33 (92)
Mean daily minimum °C (°F)	16 (61)	17 (62)	18 (64)	19 (66)	21 (70)	22 (71)	22 (71)	21 (70)	21 (70)	20 (68)	18 (65)	18 (64)	19 (67)
Average precipitation mm (inches)	43 (1.7)	56 (2.2)	46 (1.8)	38 (1.5)	79 (3.1)	150 (5.8)	150 (5.8)	170 (6.6)	160 (6.2)	140 (5.4)	56 (2.2)	51 (2)	1,139 (44.3)
Source: Weatherbase
