= Espita Municipality =

Municipality in the Mexican state of Yucatán

Espita
- Municipality
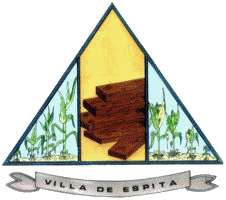
- Coat of arms

- Location of the Municipality
- Country: Mexico
- State: Yucatán
- Mexico Ind.: 1821
- Yucatan Est.: 1824
- Municipality Est.: 1921

Government
  - Municipal President: José Luis Uc Moo (2010-2012)

Area
  - Total: 496.91 km^{2} (191.86 sq mi)
- Elevation: 15 m (49 ft)

Population (2005)
  - Total: 14,432
  - Demonym: espitan
- Time zone: UTC-6 (Central Standard Time)
- Postal Code: 97730
- Area code: 986
- INEGI Code: 31032

Espita Municipality is a municipality in the Mexican state of Yucatán. Its municipal seat is located in the City of Espita and is located on the Litoral Oriente (East Coast) or Region 1 of the state. In 2005, the municipality had the 77th highest HDI in the state with 0.7320, the same as Honduras in 2007.

== Geography ==
This municipality is located in the eastern-part of the state. It is located between latitudes 20° 53' and 21° 08' north and longitudes 88° 16' and 88° 27' west.

It borders the following municipalities: to the north Sucilá to the south Tinum and Uayma, on the east Temozón and Calotmul and the west Dzitas - Cenotillo.

== Demography ==
=== Education ===
| Type | Students | Teachers | Schools |
|---|---|---|---|
| Preschool education | 807 | 33 | 12 |
| Primary education | 2 566 | 87 | 16 |
| Secondary education | 808 | 63 | 5 |
| High school | 396 | 25 | 1 |
| Total | 4 577 | 208 | 34 |
Source: Secretaría de Educación de Yucatán.

=== Communities ===
The Espita municipality has 17 communities and the municipal seat. In 2005, only 7 of its 17 communities had more than 200 inhabitants. Together these 7 communities had a population of 3,605, which together with the municipal seat (10,758), was 14,363, i.e. the 99.52% of the total municipal population.

Communities with over 200 people and their distance from the municipal seat
| Code | Community | Coordinates | Population | Distance |
| 310320002 | Holcá | 21°05′28″N 88°16′07″W | 501 | 9.95 km |
| 310320003 | Kunché | 20°54′35″N 88°18′16″W | 698 | 10.84 km |
| 310320004 | Nacuché | 20°55′22″N 88°17′45″W | 1.130 | 9.36 km |
| 310320005 | San Pedro Chenchelá | 20°52′29″N 88°18′51″W | 261 | 14.58 km |
| 310320007 | Tuzik | 21°06′44″N 88°28′18″W | 384 | 20.91 km |
| 310320008 | X-Ualtez | 21°07′20″N 88°28′22″W | 262 | 21.77 km |
| 310320009 | Xuilub | 20°55′00″N 88°25′12″W | 369 | 15.72 km |
Source: INEGI, Archivo Histórico de Localidaes.

== Landmarks ==
=== Architectural ===
Landmarks include:

- St. Joseph's Temple, built in the eighteenth century.
- The former Franciscan convent, built at the beginning of the sixteenth century.
- The Municipal Palace.

=== Archaeological ===
The area called Pom.
