= Río Lagartos =

Town in Yucatán, Mexico

Coordinates: 21°36′N 88°10′W

Río Lagartos is a town in the state of Yucatán, Mexico. The town lies 42 kilometres north of Tizimín. Mérida is approximately 230 kilometres further west.

Río Lagartos is located at a lagoon, the Ria Lagartos, which is part of a natural reserve. This makes it an ideal place for birdwatching. This lagoon is part of the Petenes mangroves ecoregion, and the Ria Lagartos has been designated as an internationally recognized Important Bird Area (IBA). In 2004, UNESCO designated the area as Ría Lagartos Biosphere Reserve.

The creek where Francisco Hernandez's 1517 expedition tried to obtain water, was named El Estero de los Lagartos, because of the "many large alligators".

== Photo gallery ==
View over Río Lagartos

Port of Río Lagartos

Flamingoes at the lagoon
