= Bidwell Park =

Municipal park in Chico, California

Coordinates: 39.769888°N 121.779156°W

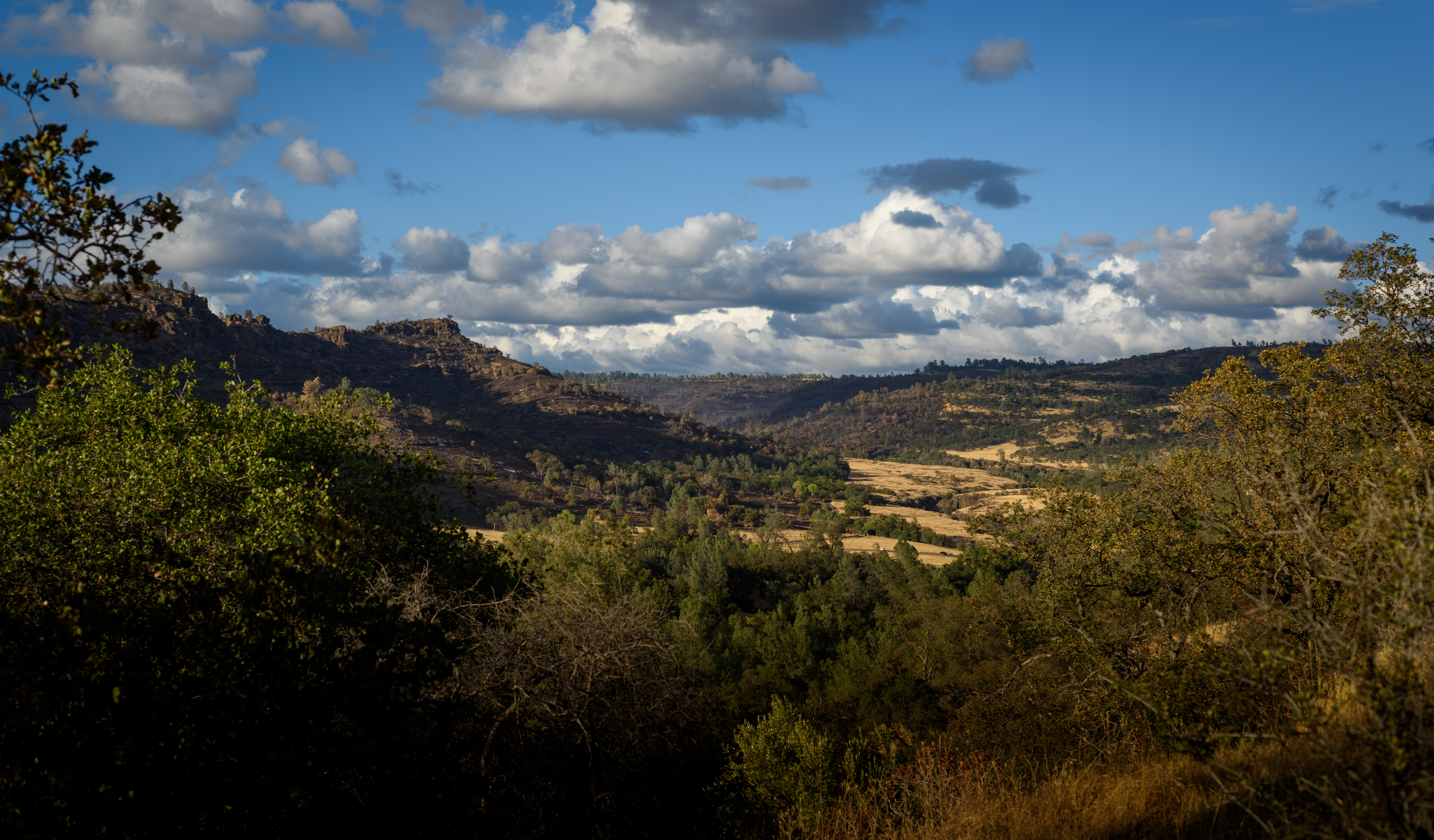
One of the canyon walls in Bidwell Park in Chico, California, showing some of the areas burned by the Park Fire.

Bidwell Park is a municipal park located in Chico, California. The park was established July 10, 1905, through the donation by Annie Bidwell, widow of Chico's founder, John Bidwell, of approximately 2,500 acres (1,000 hectares) of land to the City of Chico. Since that time, the city has purchased additional land, such as Cedar Grove in 1922, and 1,200 acres (490 ha) of land south of Big Chico Creek in upper Bidwell Park in 1995. As of 2009, the total park size is 3,670 acres (1,490 ha), nearly 11 miles (18 km) in length, making it the fifth largest municipal park in California, one of the largest city parks in the United States, and the 58th largest park in the world.

Bidwell Park is divided by Manzanita Avenue. The area west of Manzanita Avenue is referred to as Lower Park and the area to the east is referred to as Middle and Upper Park. Middle Park extends from Manzanita to a point roughly equal to the upstream edge of the Chico Municipal Golf Course. The Upper/Middle and Lower parks have differing terrain. Upper Park is located in the foothills of the southernmost Cascades. It has steep terrain and shallow soils, and contains many rock formations, including the unique Chico Formation sandstone, Lovejoy Basalt, and Tuscan Formation rocks. Lower Park is flat and level with a deep soil structure supporting a thick canopy of trees which provide ample shade for visitors. Special rules apply in the Upper Park and the road is unpaved for much of its length.

In July 2024, the Park Fire was begun by an act of alleged arson in the Upper Park, which burned a portion of the park near Alligator Hole.

== Points of interest ==
Cliffs and Big Chico Creek in Upper Park

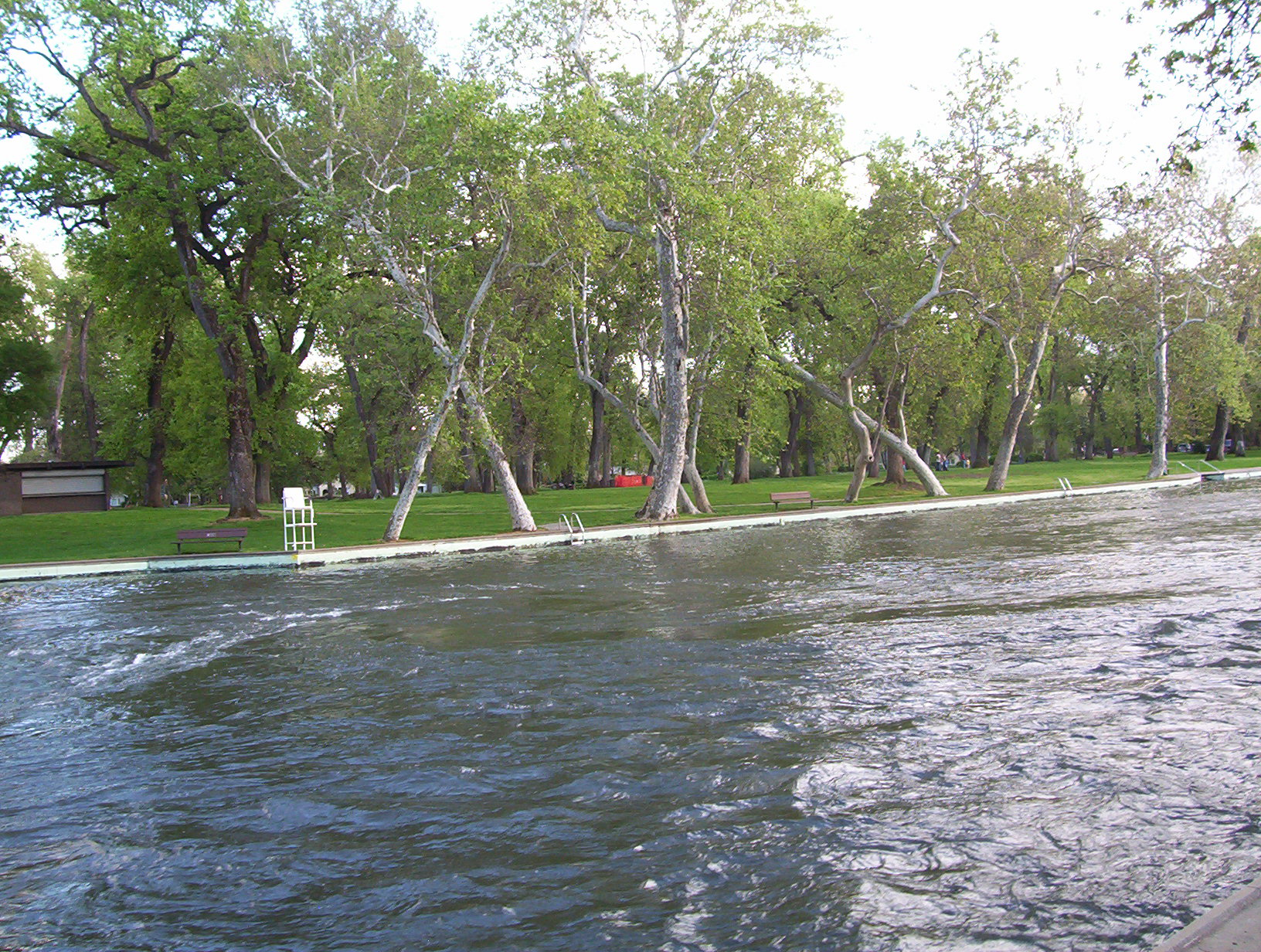
Lower Bidwell Park's Sycamore Pool

- Sycamore Pool, located in the One Mile Recreation Area. The creek was dammed by the city in the 1920s; but the pool was cemented and finished out by the Works Progress Administration (WPA) in the 1930s, as part of several WPA improvements to Bidwell Park. There are tile depth markers every six feet or so along the pool’s edge. The lifeguard chairs look original, but that is uncertain. A bridge across the dam was built later using state Land & Water Conservation Funds. The pool provides a unique swimming experience because its concrete decks, walls, and bottom are built to contain Big Chico Creek as it flows through the park. A dam and fish ladder at one end allow control of the creek's flow. The dam is raised and lifeguards are present from Memorial Day to Labor Day of each year. Above the fish ladder there is a bridge that separates the pool and the creek, from which many locals feed sucker fish in the bottom of the fish ladder. Locals often refer to Sycamore Pool simply as One Mile.
- Caper Acres playground is also located in the One Mile Recreation Area. Originally constructed in the 1950s, the playground provides a fairy tale-themed location for children to play in. Many play attractions in the playground were destroyed by a storm in 1995, but were rebuilt by members of the community. Adult visitors to the playground must be accompanied by a child 13 years of age or younger.
- Cedar Grove is home to the 2nd tree experimentation farm in the U.S. Trees from around the world were planted in the grove by John Bidwell in 1888.
- Five Mile, located near Manzanita Avenue in the upper park area, is a manicured park and picnic area. A flood control dam makes the water deep enough for swimming in the spring and summer. During times of high water, part of the flow of Big Chico Creek is diverted into the Diversion Channel which flows into Lindo Channel, on the north side of town.
- The Hooker Oak was a large Valley Oak which grew along Manzanita Avenue north of Big Chico Creek near the Five Mile recreation area. Investigation of the 'tree' upon its death revealed that it was actually two trees that had grown together.
- Horseshoe Lake, located in upper Bidwell Park, was constructed in the 1930s as a reservoir in which to irrigate the Bidwell Municipal Golf Course, located across Upper Park Road from the lake. The land around the lake was the site of several shooting ranges. One was used by the California National Guard and later, during World War II, the U.S. Army. A concrete bunker used for military target practice still remains next to the lake today. The other two ranges were used by civilians to shoot rifles and shotguns (skeet). All remnants of the shooting ranges (with exception of the military bunker) were removed in 2005 as part of a lead and skeet removal project. The lake is also the site of the annual "Hooked on Fishing, Not on Drugs" fishing derby for children.
- Monkey Face is a rock formation that was so named because it resembles a semi profile of a monkey head. It faces west over parking area E and Horseshoe Lake. The best place to start is from parking area E. As of Jan. 2013, major efforts are being made by the Park Dept. to mitigate erosion damage from multiple trails. Park users can respect the environment by using the trails designated.
- Alligator Hole is a shallow swimming hole in upper Bidwell Park near an area used by the Boy Scouts of America for campouts and other gatherings, between Horseshoe Lake and Bear Hole. Refrain from creating rock dams in the area, which are prevalent in the creek, but impede upon the movement of the salmon runs.
- Bear Hole, located in upper Bidwell Park beyond Horseshoe Lake, is a part of the creek that is frequently used for swimming and diving. The water is deep during the spring and summer and rocks on both sides are used for sunbathing. However, the currents in the area have a reputation for being dangerously unpredictable and have at times been fatal. In 1998 there were 4 drowning deaths within months. Bear Hole has a dirt and gravel parking area and a short trail.
- Diversion Dam, located just upstream from Bear Hole, is so named because it diverted some of the water from Big Chico Creek into a flume for use by the city. Remains of the flume can be seen along the banks of Big Chico Creek downstream of Bear Hole, and just upstream of Alligator Hole the flume track leaves the main creek channel and continues across the open area north of the creek.
- Salmon Hole, located in upper Bidwell Park beyond Bear Hole, is a part of the creek that is used for swimming. The site, which is essentially a large pond along the creek, is less accessible by car than Bear Hole and requires a short hike downward from the top of the rim. Visitors should come prepared to do some climbing. The salmon here have several hurdles to reach their native habitat. Refraining from building rock dams that span the creek is a good idea.
- Devil's Kitchen, North Rim, B Trail, Yahi Trail, Bidwell Municipal Golf Course.

== Ecology ==
Bidwell Park is home to a multitude of plant and animal species because it is at a point where Sierra Nevada, Cascade, and Central Valley species interact. The parks ecology also changes east-west as the park changes from flat valley to rugged foothills. The park's climate is classified as Mediterranean because it has cool rainy winters and hot dry summers.

Animal species include mammals such as American black bear, little brown bat, cougars, beavers, coyotes and others. Prominent birds in the park are acorn woodpecker, red-tailed hawk, Western screech owl, turkey vulture, mallard, Canada goose, and northern flicker. Fish species include salmon (although their numbers have declined greatly), trout, bass and bluegill. Fishing is allowed in certain parts of the park. Reptile species of the area include Western pond turtle, Western toad, Southern alligator lizard, and the venomous Western rattlesnake.

Plant life in the area changes as the park rises out of the valley, from riparian to chaparral and oak woodland. In the riparian along Big Chico Creek the main species include, Western Sycamore, the endemic to California valley oak, wild grape, blackberry, and Northern California black walnut. Oak woodlands are an especially important ecosystem in the park. Past the 5-Mile Recreation Area, the foothills of the southernmost Cascade Mountains begin and the flora changes. Gray pine or Foothill Pine become more frequent. In some parts along the creek ponderosa pine, incense cedar, and douglas-fir are present. California buckeye, manzanita, California bay laurel, miner's lettuce, interior live oak, and seasonal non-native field grasses cover the canyon floor. On top the mesas on each side of the canyon and on the slopes of the canyon blue oak are present due to their deep taproots allowing survival in dry conditions.

== Geography and geology ==
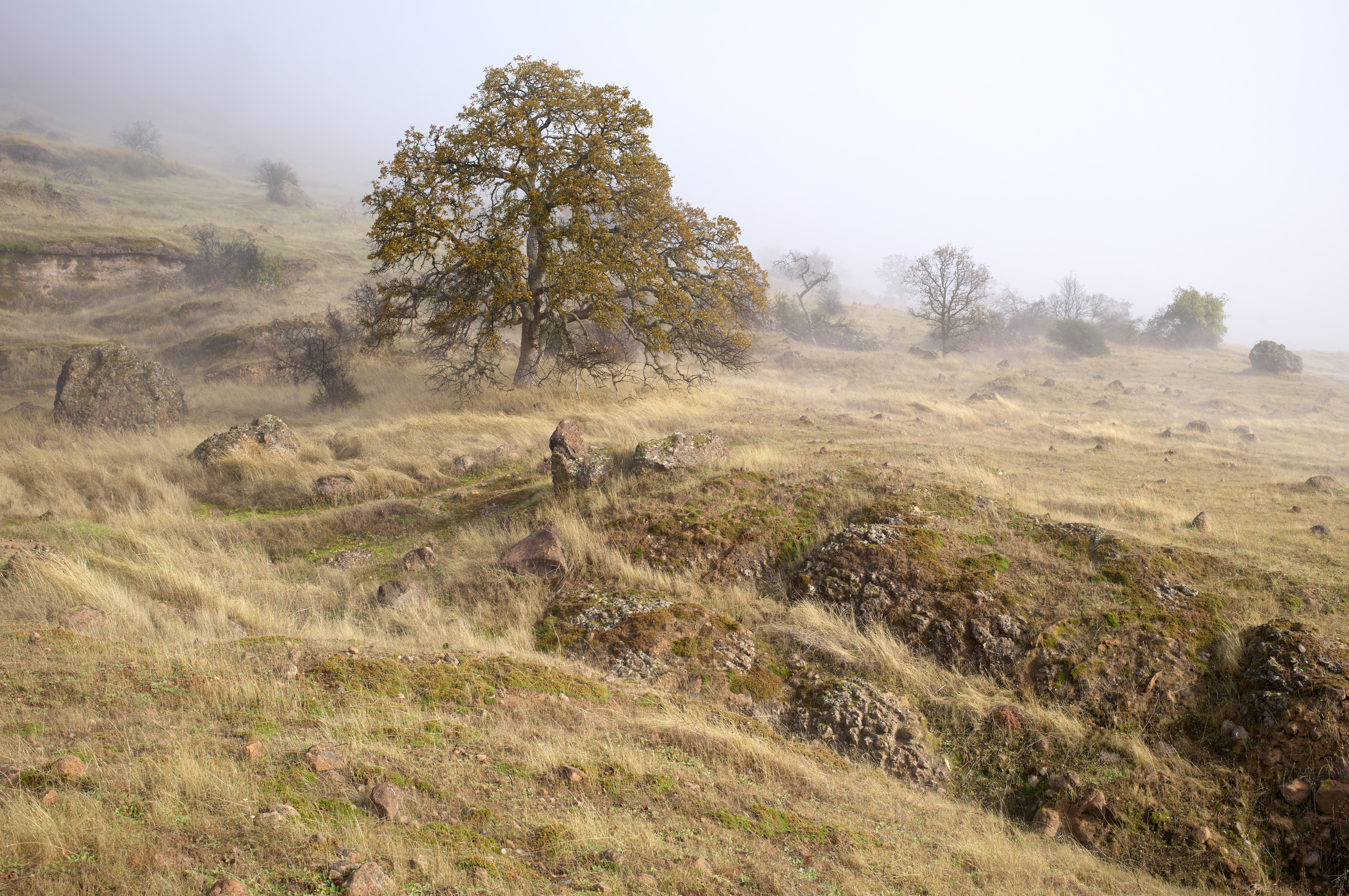
Rock formations along Upper Park Trail

The geography of Bidwell Park is relatively simple. Big Chico Creek enters the park from the east within Iron Canyon, a deep, thin channel characterized by large boulders of basalt, and tall, steep cliffs. Iron Canyon is situated in a larger canyon called Chico Canyon. Chico Canyon is a bowl-shaped canyon with flat mesas on each side. Downstream, the creek exits Iron Canyon and begins to widen at the floor of the relatively flat bottom of Chico Canyon. As the creek leaves the foothills it begins to meander on the floor of the Sacramento Valley. West of 5-Mile Recreation Area, the creek enters more urban parts of the park. The park begins to thin as it stretches into the heart of Chico. By its westernmost point, the park encompasses just the banks of the creek. The western boundary is at the Esplanade road.

The geology of the park varies as the park travels from the Central Valley floor, to the foothills of the Cascade Mountains. The geology of the park is mainly volcanic due to the Cascades being a volcanic range. Big Chico Creek exposes many layers of geologic history of Northern California.

The bedrock layer under the park, and much of California is called the Chico Formation. It consists of sandstone and fossils from an ancient sea that once covered the Central Valley and the ancestral Sierra Nevada Mountains during the Cretaceous Period. This formation is visible in Upper Park near the eastern boundary. It is also visible in many areas outside the park in the Sierra Nevada, Coastal Ranges and Cascade foothills. Above the Chico Formation lies the Lovejoy Basalt. Evident by its dark, smooth complexion, the Lovejoy Basalt makes up most of Iron Canyon in Upper Bidwell Park. Swimming holes such as Bear Hole and Salmon lie in the basalt. This rock erupted from an ancient volcano near present-day Susanville, CA about 15 million years ago, during the Miocene. The Lovejoy Basalt extends through much of Northern California, and is notable at Table Mountain near Oroville, CA, and Black Butte Lake, west of Orland, CA. Above the Lovejoy Basalt lies the Tuscan Formation, a complex of volcanic lahars and volcanic ash, separated by layers of river cobble. The Tuscan Formation was created in a series of volcanic mudflows from extinct volcanoes, Mt. Maidu and Mt. Yana, between 10 and 2 million years ago during the Miocene and Pleistocene. The formation dives beneath Chico and holds the city's immense aquifer from which it derives its water. The Tuscan Formation is visible in all of Upper Park, and forms the steep canyon walls of Chico Canyon, and makes up the famous Monkey Face rock formation. Small caves can sometimes be found in this formation. Lower Bidwell Park sits atop a deep soil complex of alluvium deposited by Big Chico Creek. This allows for the thick canopy of trees and undergrowth seen in lower park.

== Chico Creek Nature Center ==
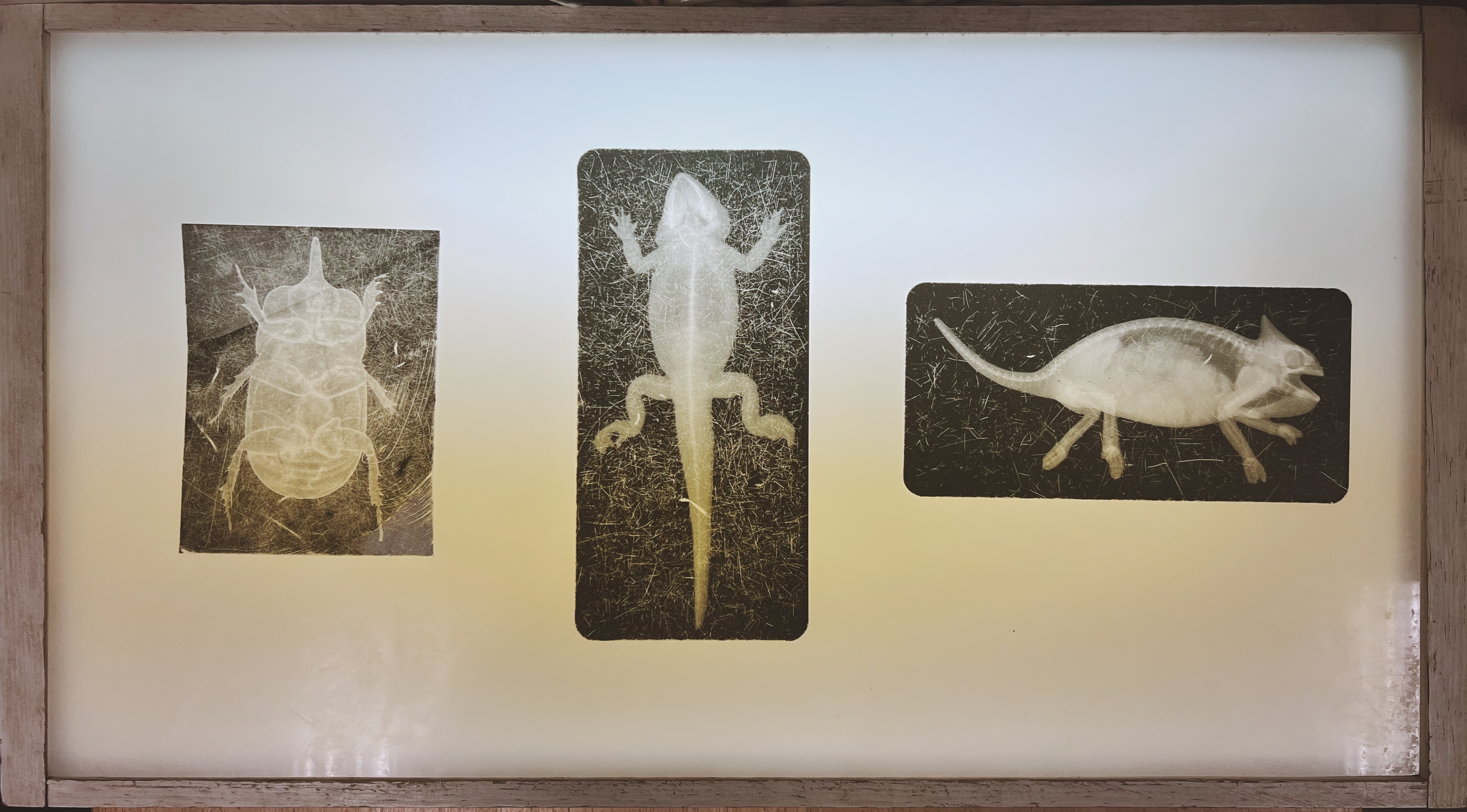
Interactive Light Box at the Chico Creek Nature Center

Chico Creek Nature Center, the park's official interpretive center, is managed by the Chico Area Recreational District (CARD), however, it was a private non-profit until 2018. It is dedicated to enhancing the public's awareness of Bidwell Park and its wildlife. The center features non-releasable injured wildlife and donated animals in the Janeece Webb Living Animal Museum and the Alice Heckert Native Plant Garden. The Center opened a new facility in spring of 2010, including the installation of new natural history exhibits in Howard S. Tucker Hall and a hands-on science classroom, Kristie's Nature Lab.

Programs offered include preschool-age workshops, nature-themed birthday parties, exploration-oriented day camps, and K-6 grade environmental education field trips, guided nature hikes, and nature education programs for all ages.

== See also ==
- Bidwell Mansion State Historic Park
- Big Chico Creek
- City of Chico
