= Chionodes petalumensis =

Scientific classification
- Kingdom: Animalia
- Phylum: Arthropoda
- Clade: Pancrustacea
- Class: Insecta
- Order: Lepidoptera
- Family: Gelechiidae
- Genus: Chionodes
- Species: C. petalumensis

Binomial name
- Chionodes petalumensis Clarke, 1947

Synonyms
- Chionodes raspyon Opler, 1974

Species of moth

Chionodes petalumensis is a species of moth in the family Gelechiidae. It is found in North America from southern British Columbia to California, Arizona and Colorado.

Chionodes petalumensis caterpillars feed on oak leaves, including those of the Garry oak (Quercus garryana) and valley oak (Q. lobata).

The species was first described from Petaluma, California.
