= Hooker Oak =

Historical valley oak in California, US

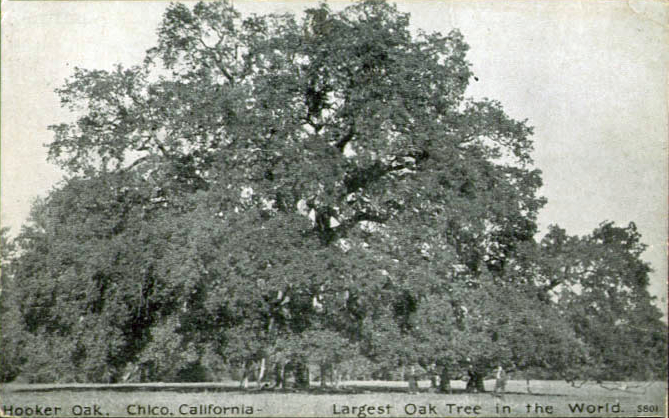
- Postcard featuring the Hooker Oak circa 1910

- Location within California
- 39.738333°N 121.825278°W
- Location: Bidwell Park, Chico, California

California Historical Landmark
- Reference no.: 313

Hooker Oak was an extremely large valley oak tree (Quercus lobata) in Chico, California. Amateur botanist and local socialite Annie Bidwell, whose husband had founded Chico, named the tree in 1887 after English botanist and Director of the Royal Botanical Gardens Sir Joseph Dalton Hooker. It was featured in the 1938 film The Adventures of Robin Hood starring Errol Flynn. The tree fell in 1977, and portions of it were later milled for use by local artisans.

== Discovery ==
Upon first seeing the tree in 1872, Hooker declared the tree to be the largest of its species in the known world. Since then other valley oaks have been found of similar size. On January 7, 1958, the Sacramento Bee reported that in 1921 the Hooker Oak was over 110 ft (34 m) tall and estimated that 7,885 people could stand under its canopy assuming 2 sq ft (0.2 m^{2}) per person.

== Death ==
When it fell on May 1, 1977, it was nearly a hundred feet tall (30 m) and at eight feet (2.4 m) from the ground, 29 feet (8.8 m) in circumference. The largest branch measured 111 feet (34 m) from trunk to tip and the circumference of outside branches was nearly five hundred feet (150 m). Its age had been estimated at a thousand years, but on its demise it was found to be two trees, of 325 years each which had long ago grown into one.

=== Disposition ===
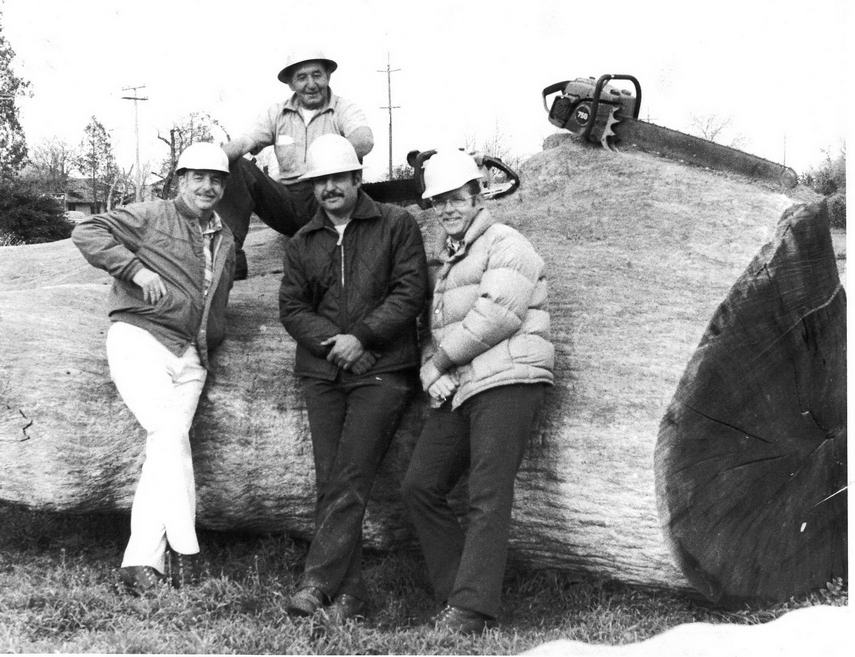
Photo of loggers alongside the main trunk of the Hooker Oak in the early 1980s

For three years after falling, the tree lay on the ground whist city leaders struggled to determine its fate. In the spring of 1980 the City of Chico commissioned Cal Oak Lumber Company to remove and reclaim sound portions of the tree at Cal Oak's Oroville hardwood plant; they were allowed to retain some of the wood as compensation. After milling the oak, Cal Oak arranged for the lumber to be dried at the University of California's Forest Products Laboratory.

Cal Oak set up a program using local artisans as well as the work training centers for the handicapped to produce a limited number of artistically designed items from its share of the tree. Many of these were given to various institutions, which included the Royal Botanical Gardens (in honor of its namesake), the Butte County Historical Society, Bidwell Mansion, Sacramento Valley Museum, Butte College, California State University, Chico, and the University of California at Berkeley. The Royal Botanical Gardens also received acorns from the original tree in 1981 and planted them in their gardens. Chico Fire Chief Elmer Brouillard made gavels and plaques from the wood for the Chico City Council.

=== Characteristics ===
Personnel at both Cal Oak and University of California Berkeley Forestry Lab became intrigued with the lumber. The wood turned out to be as remarkable as was the tree. In order to support its immense crown, the tree grew an abnormal portion of support wood on the upper side of its limbs and stems. This type wood is known as "tension wood" and helped provide the tree with an unbelievable high density: .88 specific gravity, roughly 50% heavier than surrounding oaks. This together with other special characteristics, provided the wood with its unique grain and character, and the tree with its longevity.

== In popular culture ==
The gavel used at City Council meetings by the mayor of Chico was made from the Hooker Oak by Chico Fire Chief Elmer Brouillard. The public benches in the lobby of the Chico City Council Chambers were made out of Hooker Oak wood by local artist Paul Atkins.

The Ceremonial Mace, which is held by the head of the platform party procession during the formal Commencement Ceremonies at Chico State, contains Hooker Oak wood. The mace made its debut on May 3, 2017, during the inauguration of Chico State's first female president, Gayle E. Hutchinson.

The Hooker Oak was featured Warner Brothers Studio's film The Adventures of Robin Hood (1938). Errol Flynn as Robin Hood forms his outlaw band beside the tree (called the "Gallows Oak" in the film).

The local branch of the Society for Creative Anachronism, an international non-profit focusing on pre-17th Century history, is named "The Barony of Rivenoak" after the Hooker Oak. A wood from the tree appears in their ceremonial coronet.

The location of the tree is registered as a California Historical Landmark and can be found in Bidwell Park. The playground erected on the site of the great tree was named in honor of Chico Fire Chief, Elmer Brouillard. A booklet, "The History of the Hooker Oak" was written by Debra Moon for the City Of Chico Bidwell Park Centennial Hooker Oak Bench Project and printed in July 2005.

== See also ==
- List of individual trees
