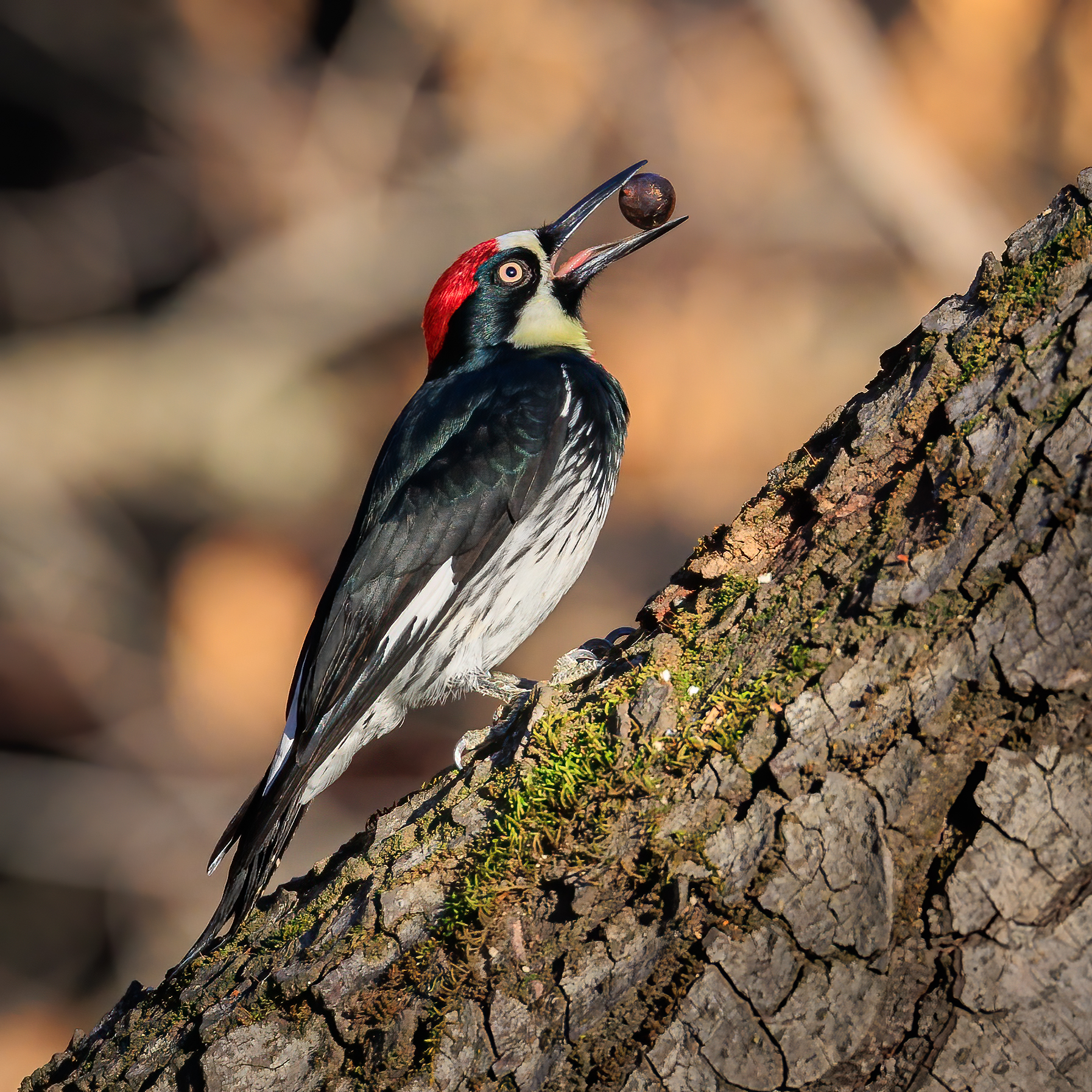
- Male in California, United States
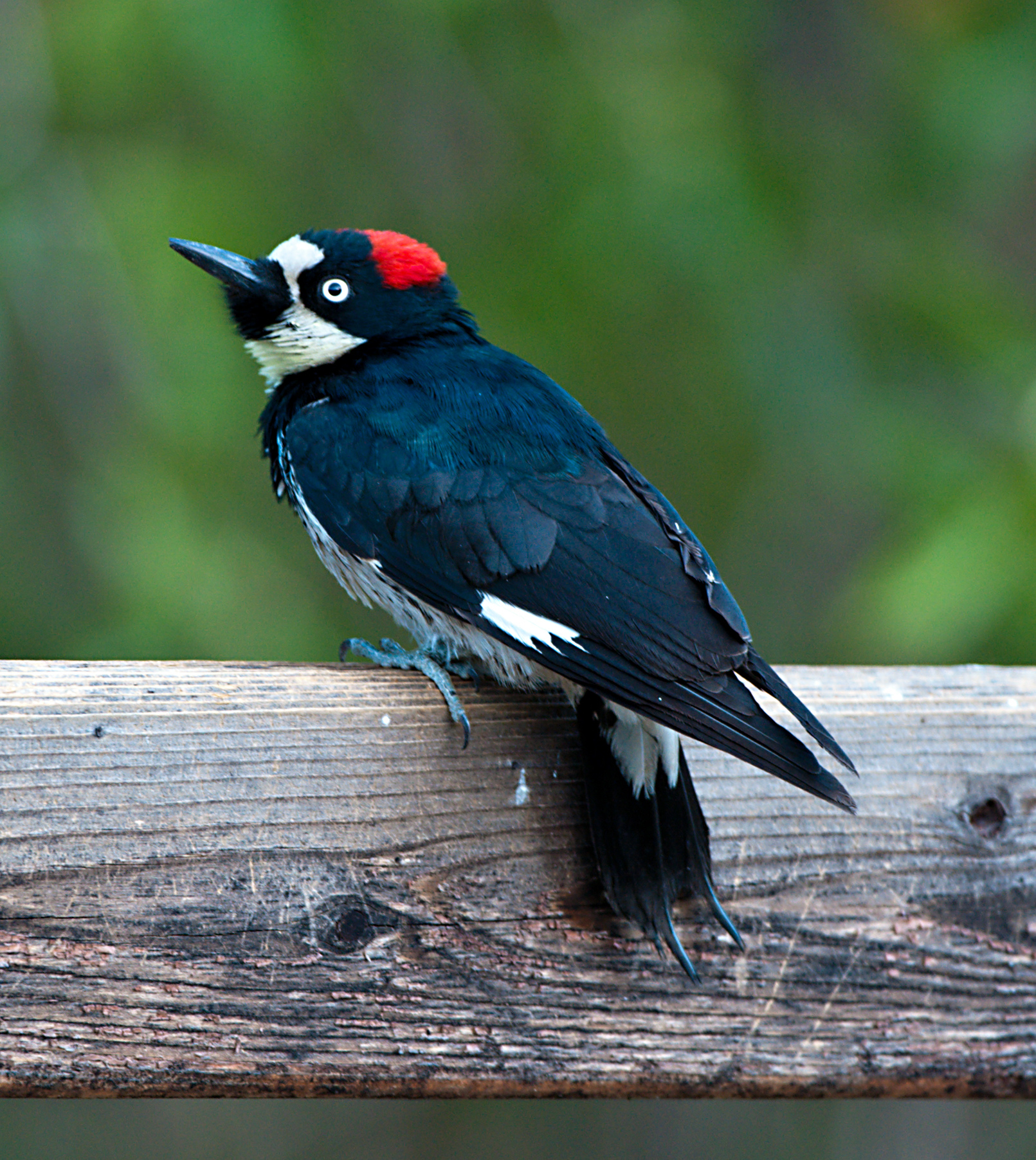
- Female in Arizona, United States

Conservation status
- Least Concern (IUCN 3.1)

Scientific classification
- Kingdom: Animalia
- Phylum: Chordata
- Class: Aves
- Order: Piciformes
- Family: Picidae
- Genus: Melanerpes
- Species: M. formicivorus

Binomial name
- Melanerpes formicivorus (Swainson, 1827)
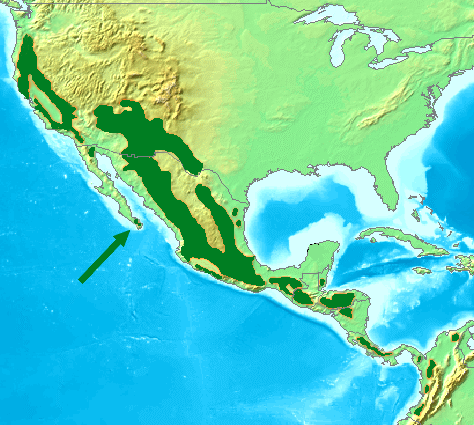
- Range of M. formicivorus

= Acorn woodpecker =

Species of bird

The acorn woodpecker (Melanerpes formicivorus) is a medium-sized woodpecker with a length of around 20 cm (8 in), and an average weight of 85 g (3.0 oz). It is found across Central America, as well as North into the western United States and South into parts of Colombia.

== Taxonomy ==
The acorn woodpecker was formally described in 1827 by the English naturalist William Swainson under the binomial name Picus formicivorus from a specimen collected in Mexico. The specific epithet combines the Latin formica meaning "ant" with -vorus meaning "eating". The type locality is Temascaltepec in Mexico. The acorn woodpecker is one of 24 species now placed in the genus Melanerpes that was introduced by Swainson in 1832. Within Melanerpes the acorn woodpecker is sister to a clade containing two South American species: the white woodpecker (Melanerpes candidus) and the white-fronted woodpecker (Melanerpes cactorum).

Seven subspecies are recognised:

- M. f. bairdi Ridgway, 1881 – Oregon (USA) to north Baja California (Mexico)
- M. f. angustifrons Baird, SF, 1870 – south Baja California (Mexico)
- M. f. formicivorus (Swainson, 1827) – southwest USA to southeast Mexico
- M. f. albeolus Todd, 1910 – east Chiapas (southeast Mexico) to Belize and northeast Guatemala
- M. f. lineatus (Dickey & Van Rossem, 1927) – Chiapas (south Mexico) to north Nicaragua
- M. f. striatipectus Ridgway, 1874 – Nicaragua to west Panama
- M. f. flavigula (Malherbe, 1849) – Colombia
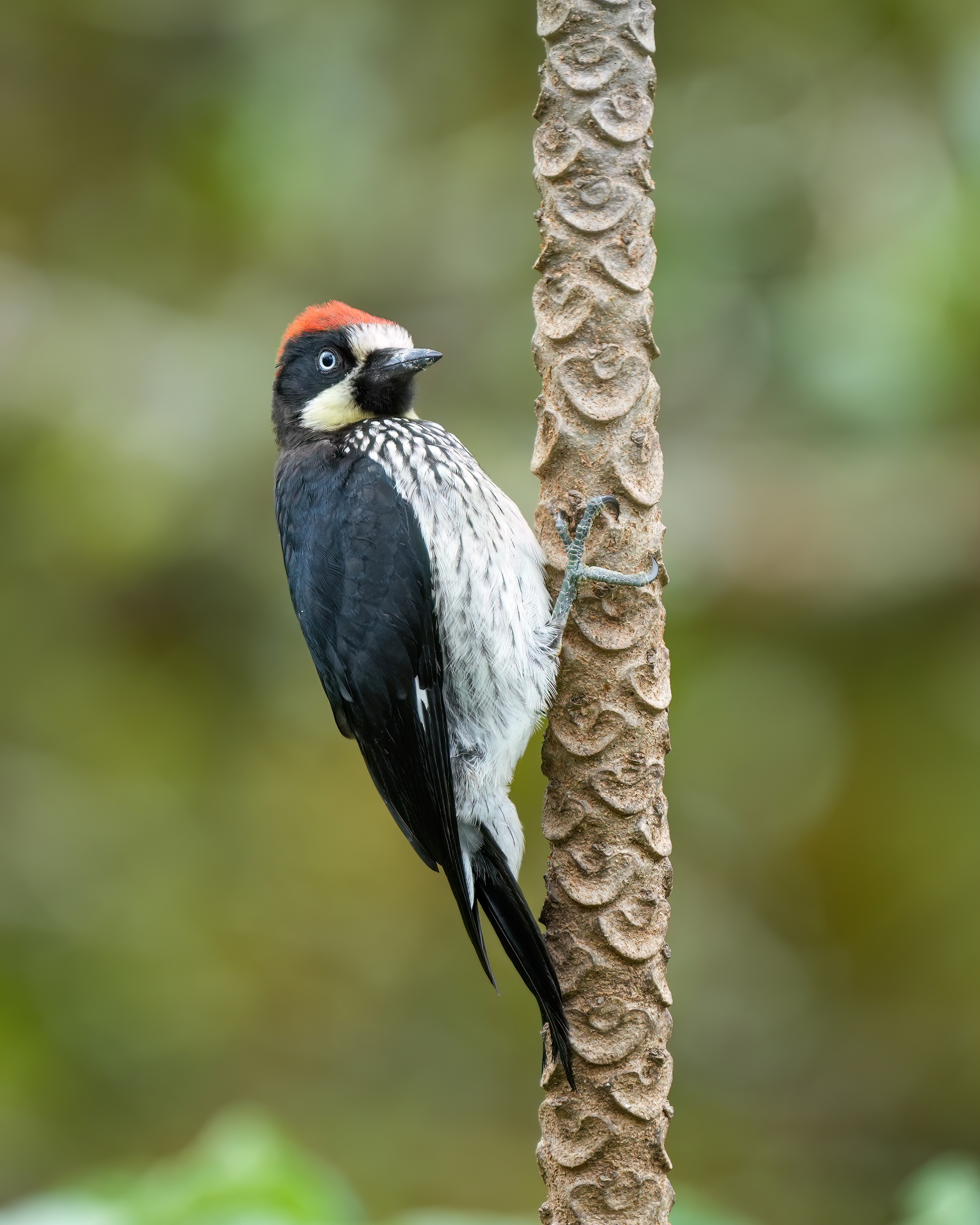
Male M. f. striatipectus, Costa Rica

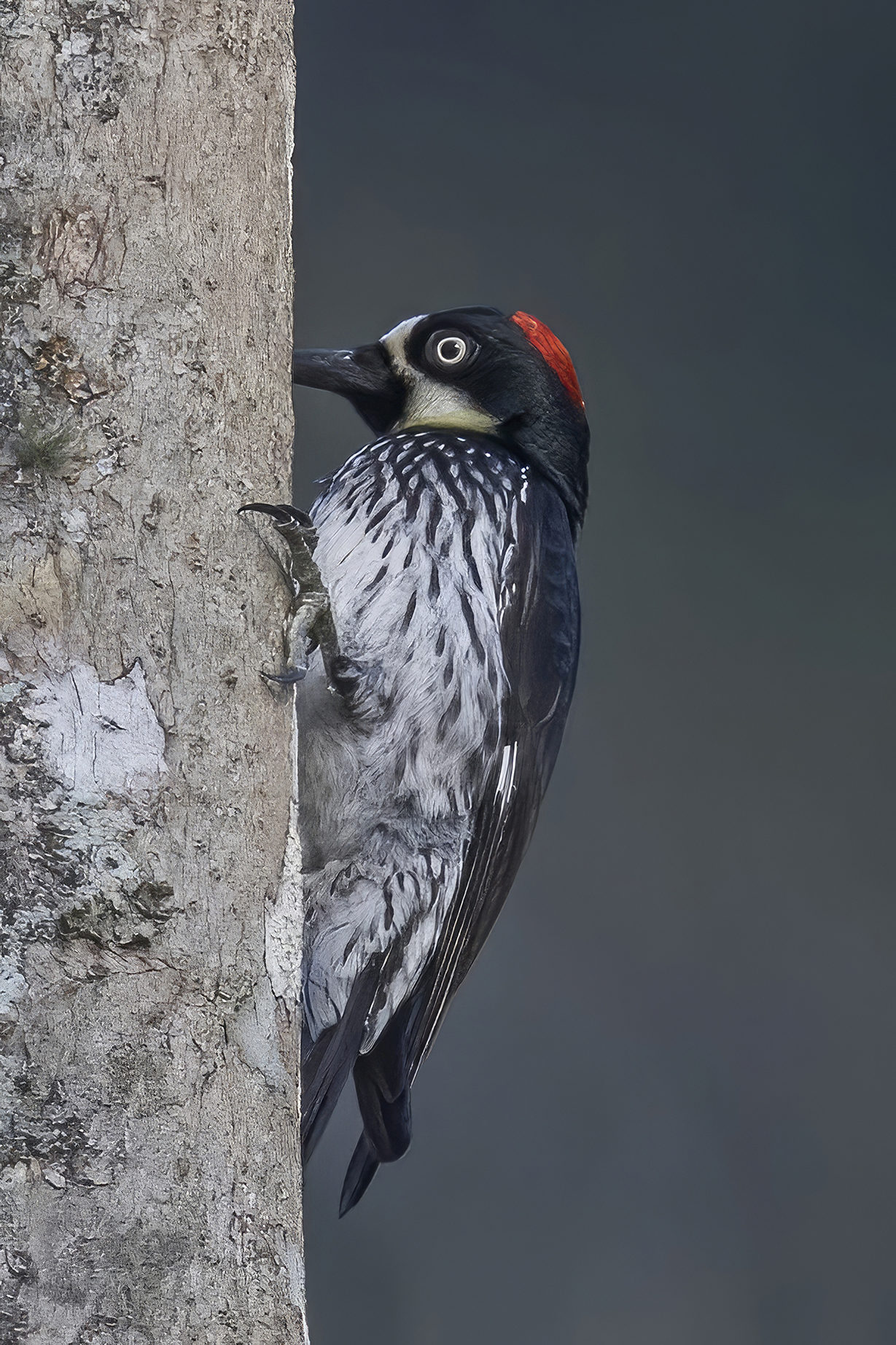
Female M. f. lineatus, Honduras

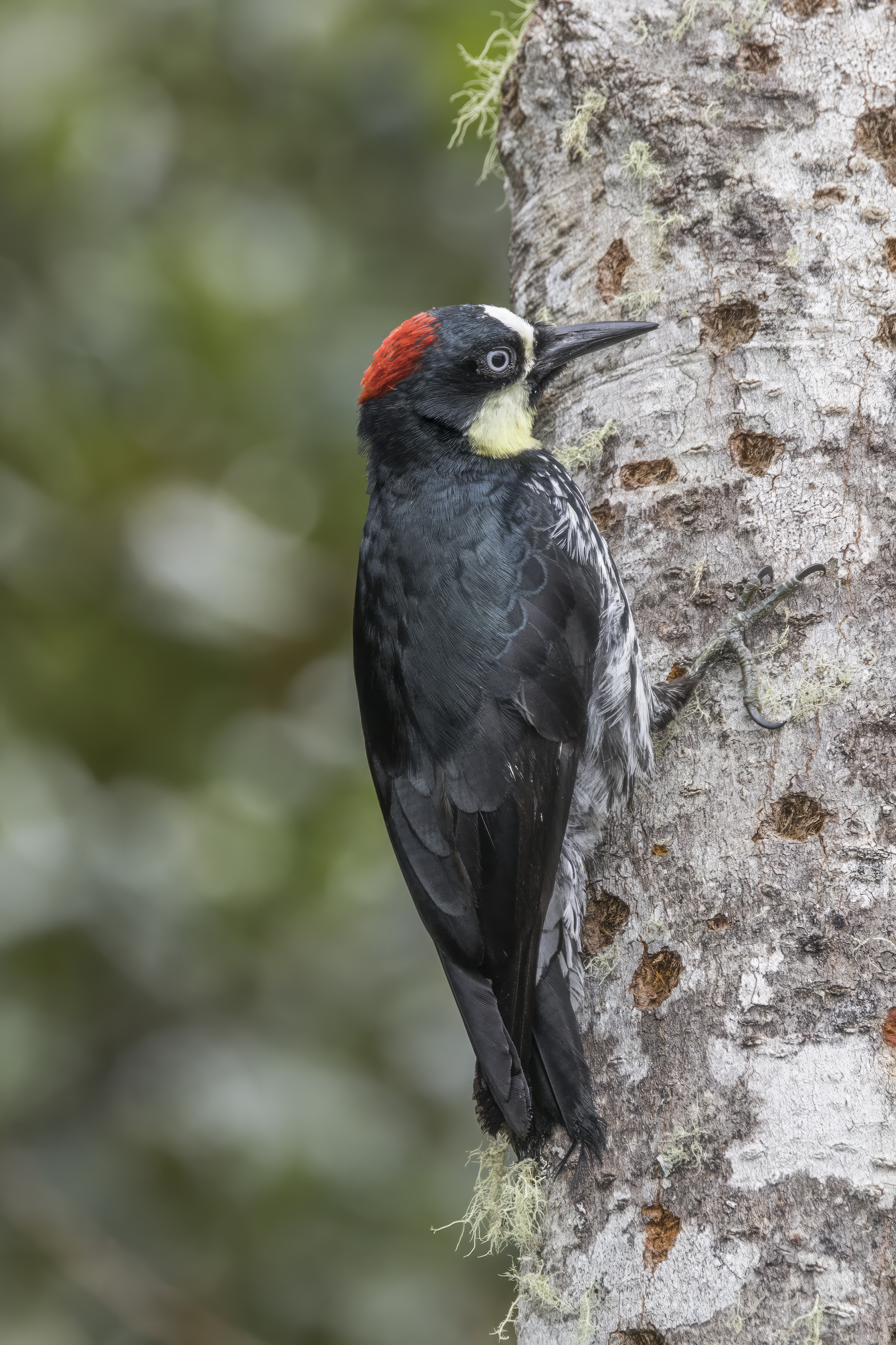
Male M. f. flavigula, Colombia

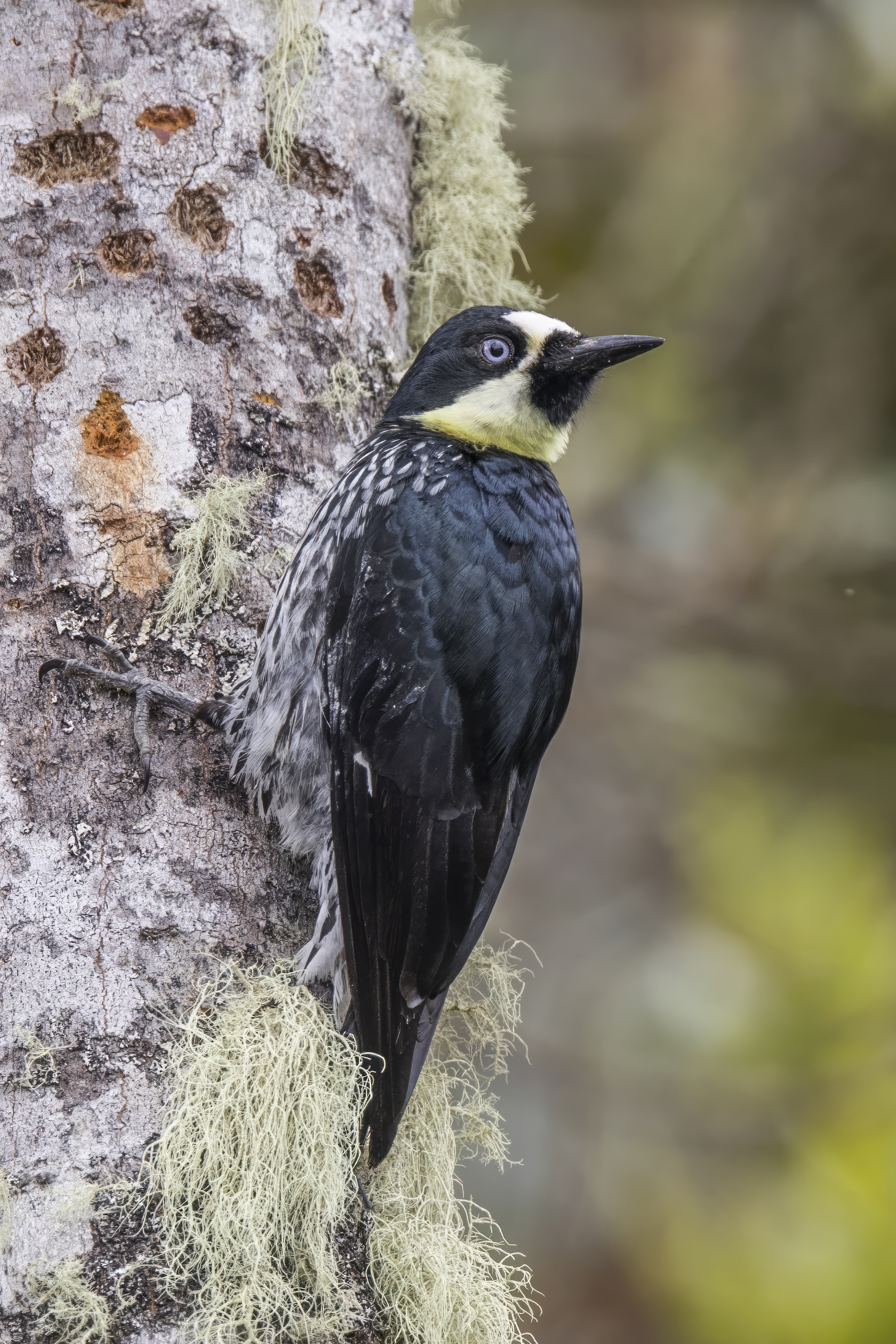
Female M. f. flavigula, Colombia

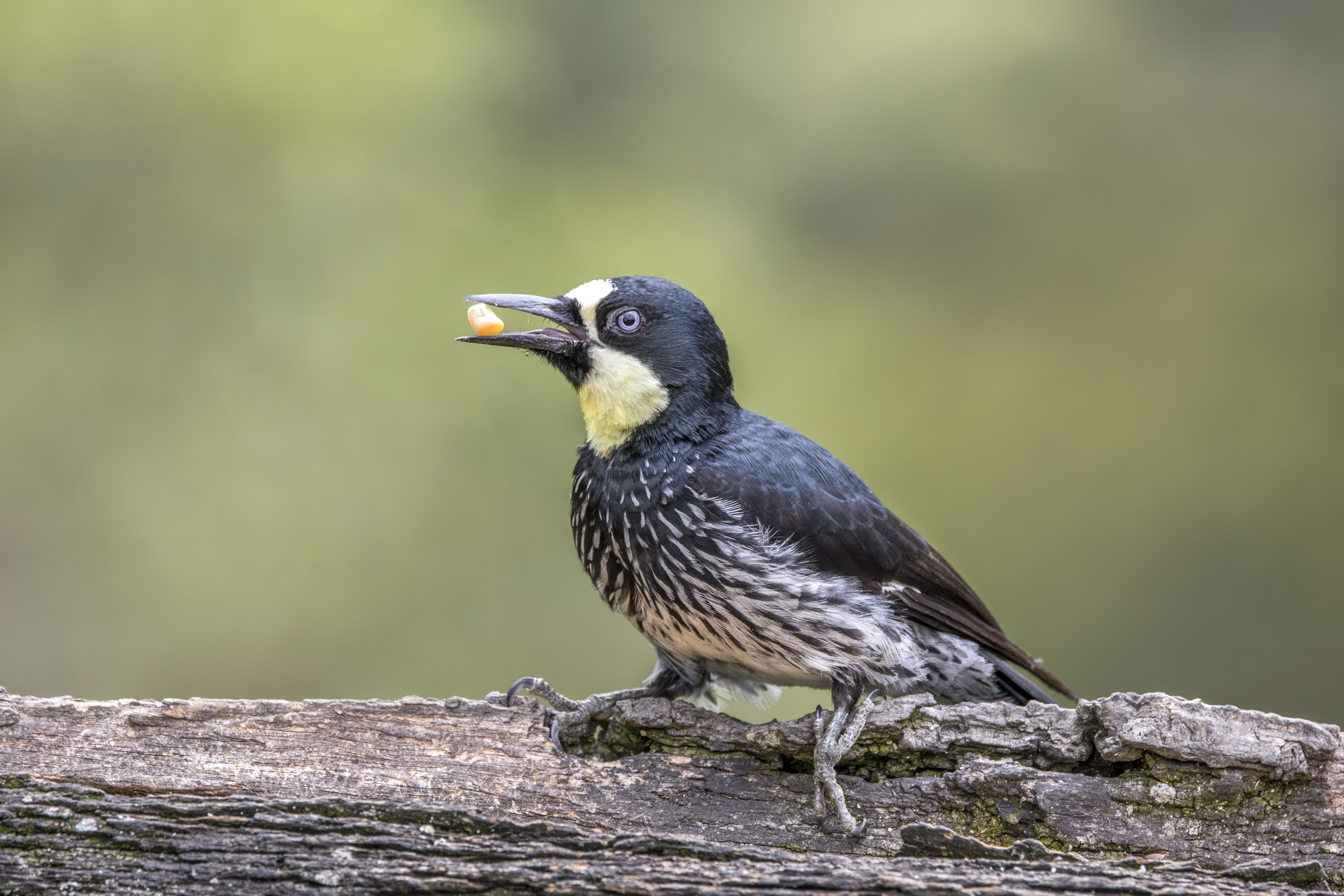
Female M. f. flavigula, Colombia

== Description ==
The adult acorn woodpecker has a brownish-black head, back, wings and tail, white forehead, throat, belly and rump. The eyes are initially dark in fledglings, turning to white within a few months. There is a small part on the small of their backs where there are some greenish feathers. The bird is mostly black, with adult males have a red cap starting at the forehead, whereas females have a black area between the forehead and the cap. The white neck, throat, and forehead patches are distinctive identifiers. When flying, they take a few flaps of their wings and drop a foot or so. White circles on their wings are visible when in flight. Acorn woodpeckers have a call that sounds almost like they are laughing.

Measurements:

- Length: 19–23 cm (7.5–9.1 in)
- Weight: 65–90 g (2.3–3.2 oz)
- Wingspan: 35–43 cm (14–17 in)

=== Distribution and habitat ===
The acorn woodpecker's habitat is forested areas with oaks in the coastal areas and foothills of Oregon, California, and the southwestern United States, south through Central America to Colombia. This species may occur at low elevations in the north of its range, but rarely below 1,000 m (3,300 ft) in Central America, and it breeds up to the timberline. Nests are excavated in a cavity in a dead tree or a dead part of a tree.

== Behaviour and ecology ==
=== Breeding ===
Acorn woodpeckers are cooperative breeders, living and breeding in family groups of up to 15 individuals. Field studies have shown that within the same population, groups range from monogamous pairs to polygynandrous breeding collectives consisting of coalitions of up to 8 males and 4 females, along with nonbreeding "helpers at the nest" that are offspring from prior breeding events. Regardless of composition, all breeder males (who are usually brothers or fathers and their sons) compete for matings with all breeder females (who are sisters or a mother and her daughter), the latter of which lay their eggs communally in the same nest cavity. There is considerable variability within and among populations, suggesting extraordinary social plasticity. Cooperative breeding, defined as more than two birds taking care of nestlings in the nest, is a relatively rare evolutionary trait that is thought to occur in only nine percent of bird species. Most cooperative breeding species have helpers at the nest, but acorn woodpeckers are unusual in exhibiting both helping at the nest and cooperative polygamy (polygynandry). It is generally believed that limited territories are a key driver of cooperative breeding behavior in birds, and in the case of the acorn woodpecker, the availability of acorn storage granaries (see below) is a key limited resource.

Breeding coalitions consist of up to eight cobreeding males and up to four joint-nesting females. However, most nests consist of only a single breeder female and 1 to 3 cobreeder males. Nesting groups can also contain up to ten offspring helpers. As mentioned above, the breeder males are often brothers, and the females are usually sisters. However, reproductive vacancies—formed when all the breeders of one sex die—are filled by unrelated birds from elsewhere, so inbreeding is rare, despite the high degree of relatedness among most group members.

In groups with more than one breeding female, the females lay their eggs in a single nest cavity. A female usually destroys any eggs in the nest before she starts to lay. Once all the females start to lay, they stop removing eggs. Although multiple paternity and maternity are common within groups containing multiple cobreeders, no extra-group paternity has been detected.

=== Food and feeding ===
Acorn woodpeckers are omnivorous and get most of their food from tree sap, insects, and green and mature acorns. In California, acorn woodpeckers obtain acorns from several oak species including valley oak, blue oak, coast live oak, California black oak, and canyon live oak which comprises 50% or more of their diet. In Arizona and New Mexico, acorns account for 25-50% of their diet. The relative importance of each species varies geographically and from year to year with acorn production. At Hastings reservation in California's central coast, Acorn woodpeckers sometimes exhibit two breeding seasons: the usual one in spring, and on one-third of years, one in August centered around the new acorn crop. The woodpeckers often inhabit areas where several oak species are present, whose acorn crops do not necessarily peak or fail in the same years, evening out the acorn supply.

Many populations of this woodpecker store acorns in "granaries", usually large trees or woody structures (such as utility poles, pinecones, fence posts and wood tri on buildings) which contain hundreds to thousands of individually drilled storage holes. They may use living or dead trees and prefer trees with thick and/or relatively soft bark, including Quercus lobata. The same granaries are used year after year and new holes are always being added. Trees used for granaries and the species of the acorns being stored may differ, and the woodpeckers prefer large trees so that they can make more holes and store more acorns. Larger granaries increase the woodpecker's chances of storing enough to last the winter. Acorns are wedged tightly into individually drilled holes so that they are more difficult for other animals to remove. As the acorns dry and shrink, the woodpeckers continually check their stores and will move loose acorns to smaller holes. Acorn woodpeckers defend their resources against jays, flickers, squirrels and other birds.

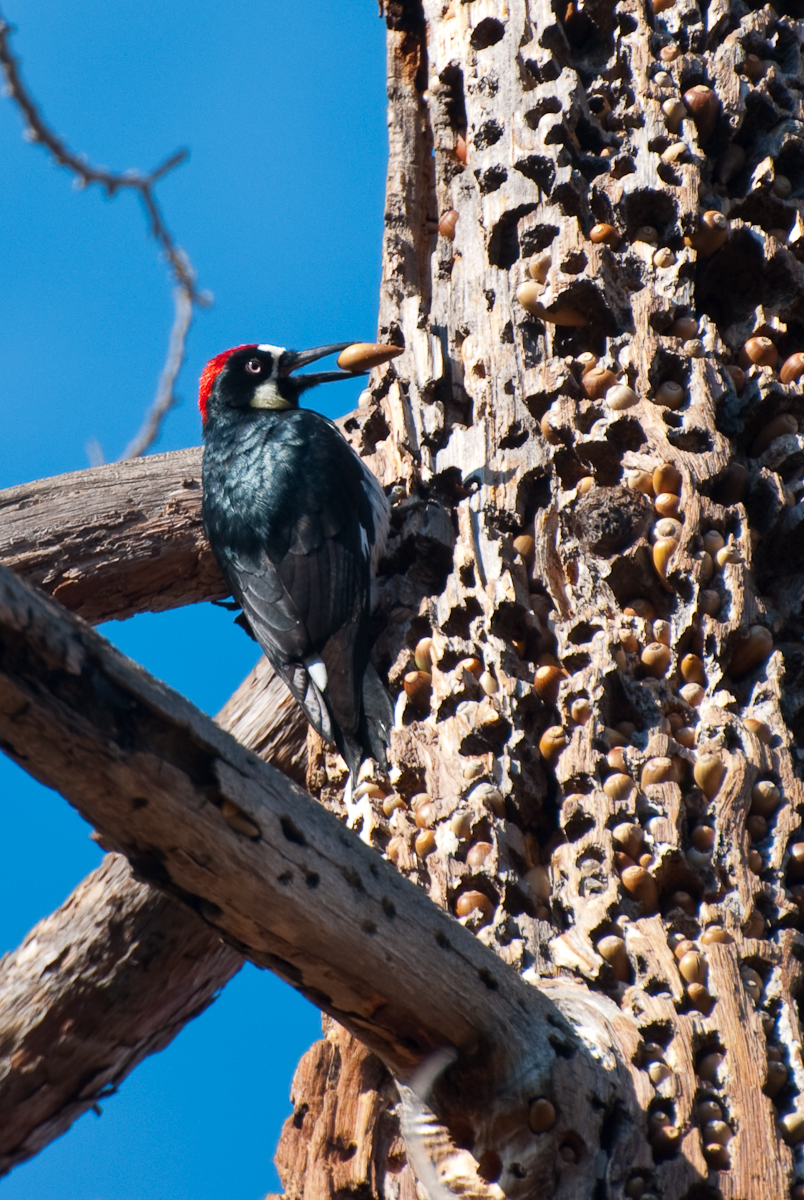
Male with "granary tree" full of acorns

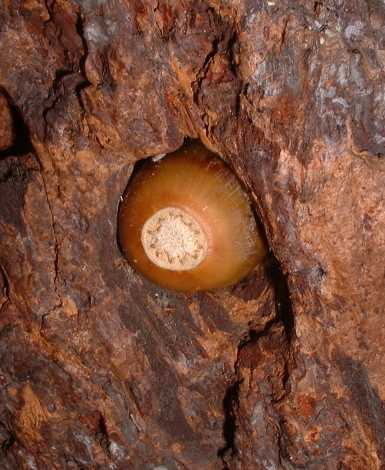
Hoarded acorn

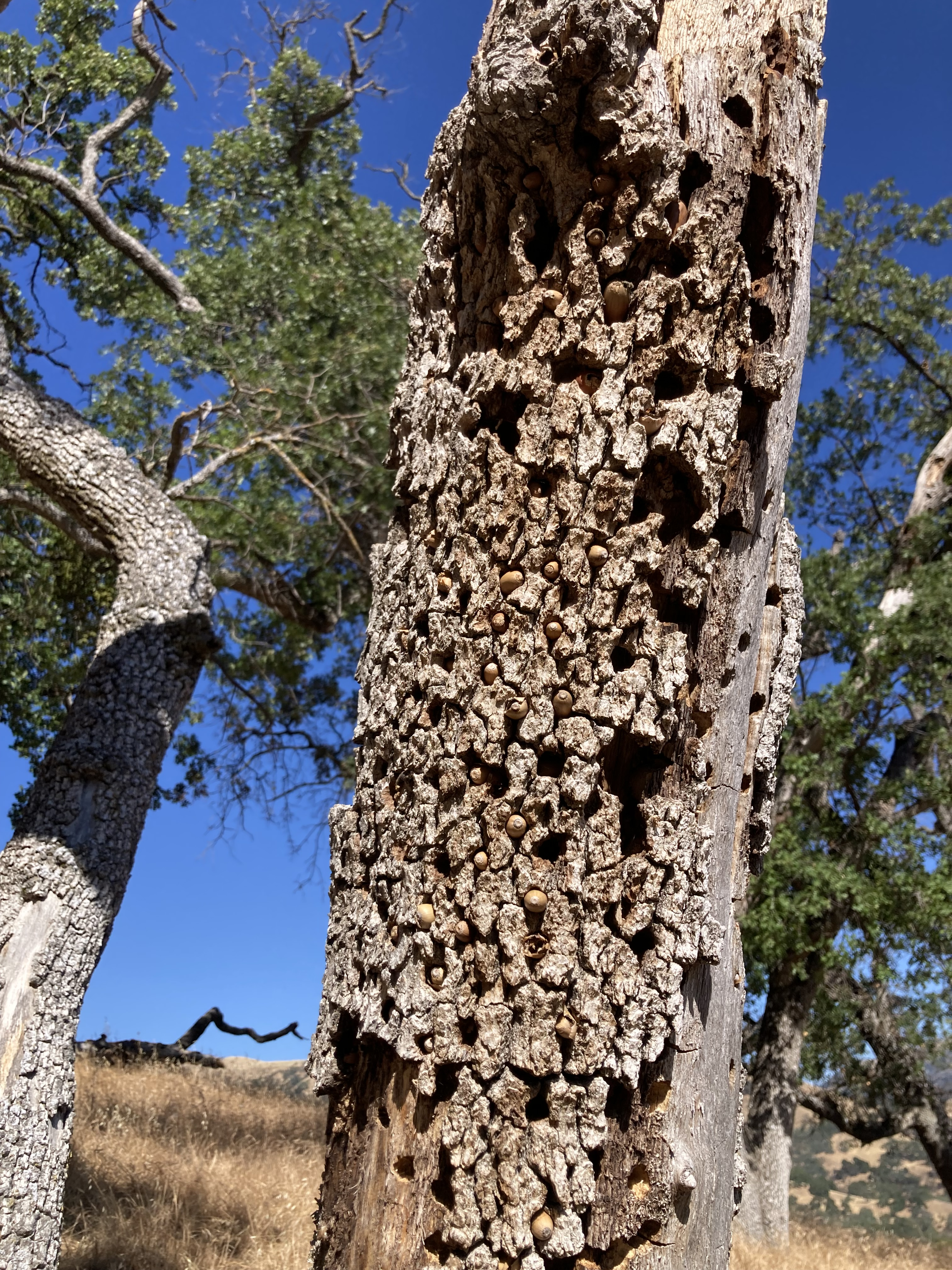
Granary tree in Sunol Wilderness

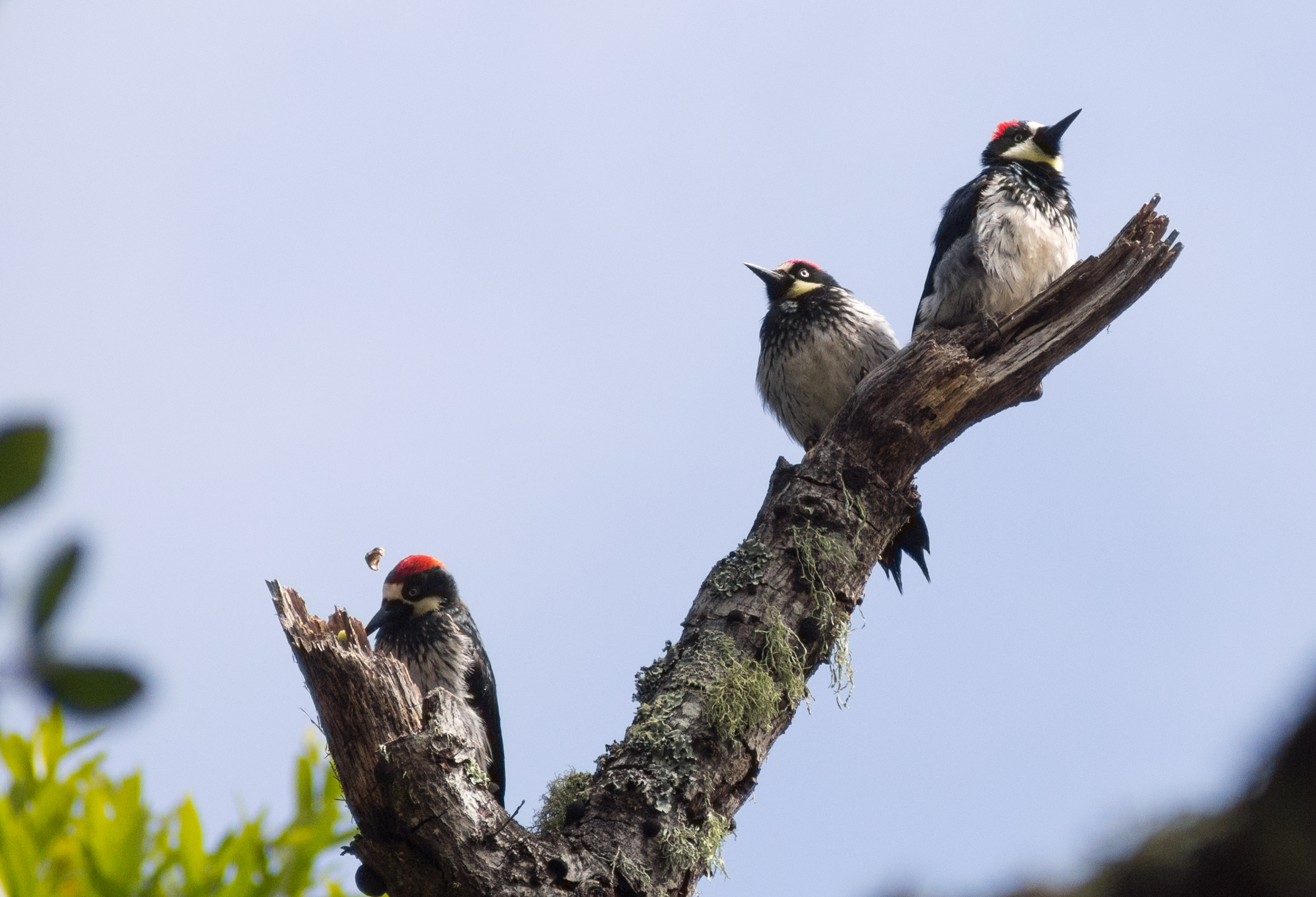
Three woodpeckers in California. One breaks open an acorn.

Food storage behavior varies geographically. In tropical parts of this species range, some populations do not maintain the large, distinct granaries characteristic of the California populations. Some tropical populations do not store food at all or store food in other natural containers such as bromeliads. In southeastern Arizona, where acorn availability is less reliable two foraging strategies may occur within close geographic proximity: some woodpeckers will form breeding pairs, not construct granaries, and will migrate at the end of the breeding season, while others will form the cooperative resident breeding groups that build and maintain granaries..

== Threats and status ==
Acorn woodpeckers, like many other species, are threatened by habitat loss and degradation. Competition for nest cavities by non-native species is an ongoing threat in urbanized areas. Conservation of this species is dependent on the maintenance of functional ecosystems that provide the full range of resources upon which the species depends. These include mature forests with oaks capable of producing large mast crops and places for the woodpeckers to nest, roost, and store mast. Residents are encouraged to preserve mature oak and pine-oak stands of trees and to provide dead limbs and snags for nesting, roosting, and granary sites to help preserve the acorn woodpecker's population.

== Popular culture ==
Walter Lantz is believed to have patterned the call of his cartoon character Woody Woodpecker on that of the acorn woodpecker, while patterning his appearance on that of the pileated woodpecker, which has a prominent crest.
