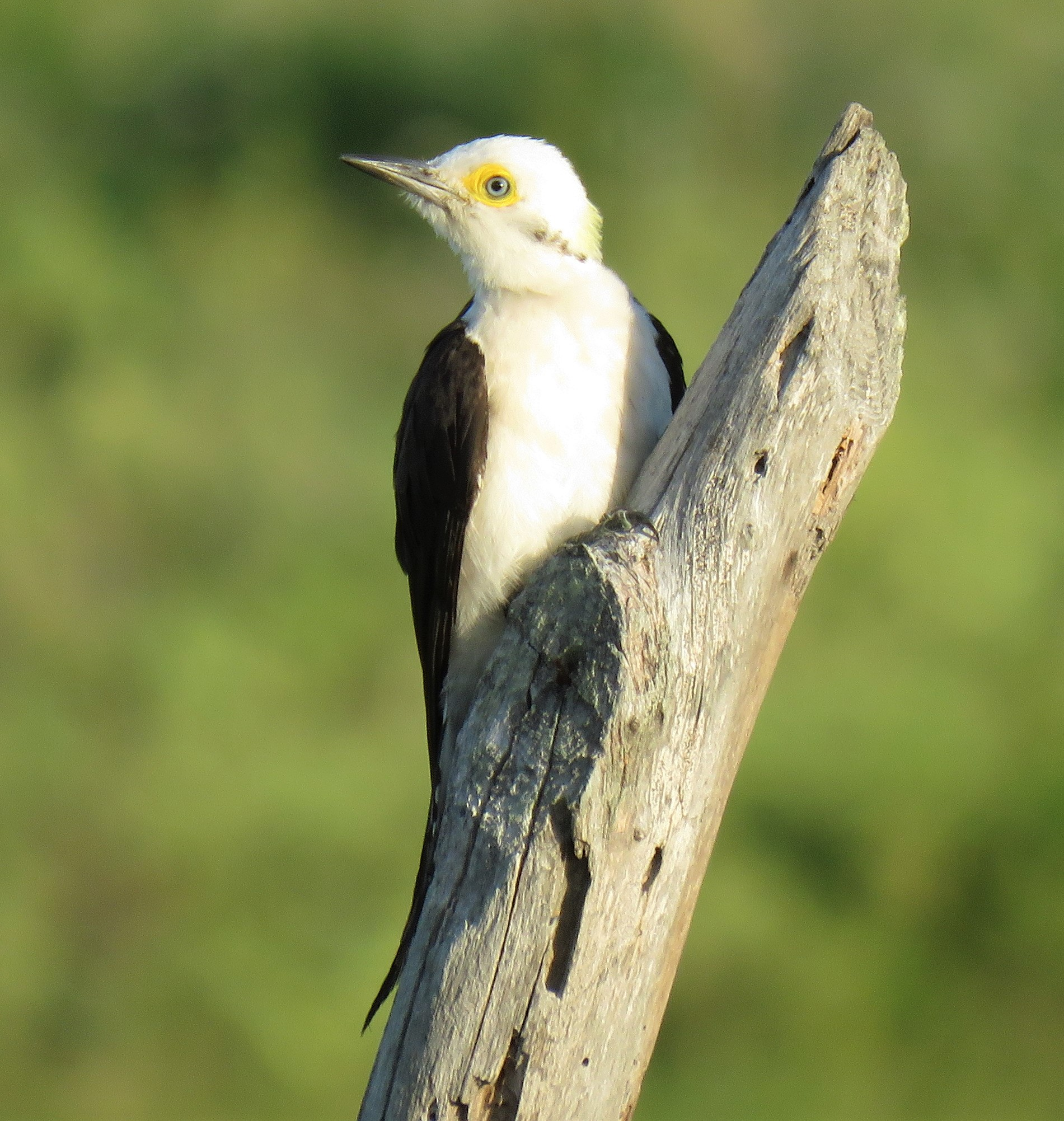

Conservation status
- Least Concern (IUCN 3.1)

Scientific classification
- Kingdom: Animalia
- Phylum: Chordata
- Class: Aves
- Order: Piciformes
- Family: Picidae
- Genus: Melanerpes
- Species: M. candidus

Binomial name
- Melanerpes candidus (Otto, 1796)

= White woodpecker =

Species of bird

The white woodpecker (Melanerpes candidus) is a South American species of woodpecker (family Picidae) native to the wooded grasslands of Suriname, French Guiana, Brazil, Bolivia, Paraguay, Uruguay and Argentina. It is a bright white bird with black wings and a distinctive small bright yellow eye patch. The IUCN has rated it as a "least-concern species".

== Taxonomy ==
The species was first described as Melanerpes candidus in 1796 by the French naturalist Bernhard Christian Otto, the type locality being Cayenne. It is sometimes placed in its own genus Leuconerpes, but shows many similarities in morphology to Melanerpes. No subspecies are known (monotypic).

== Description ==
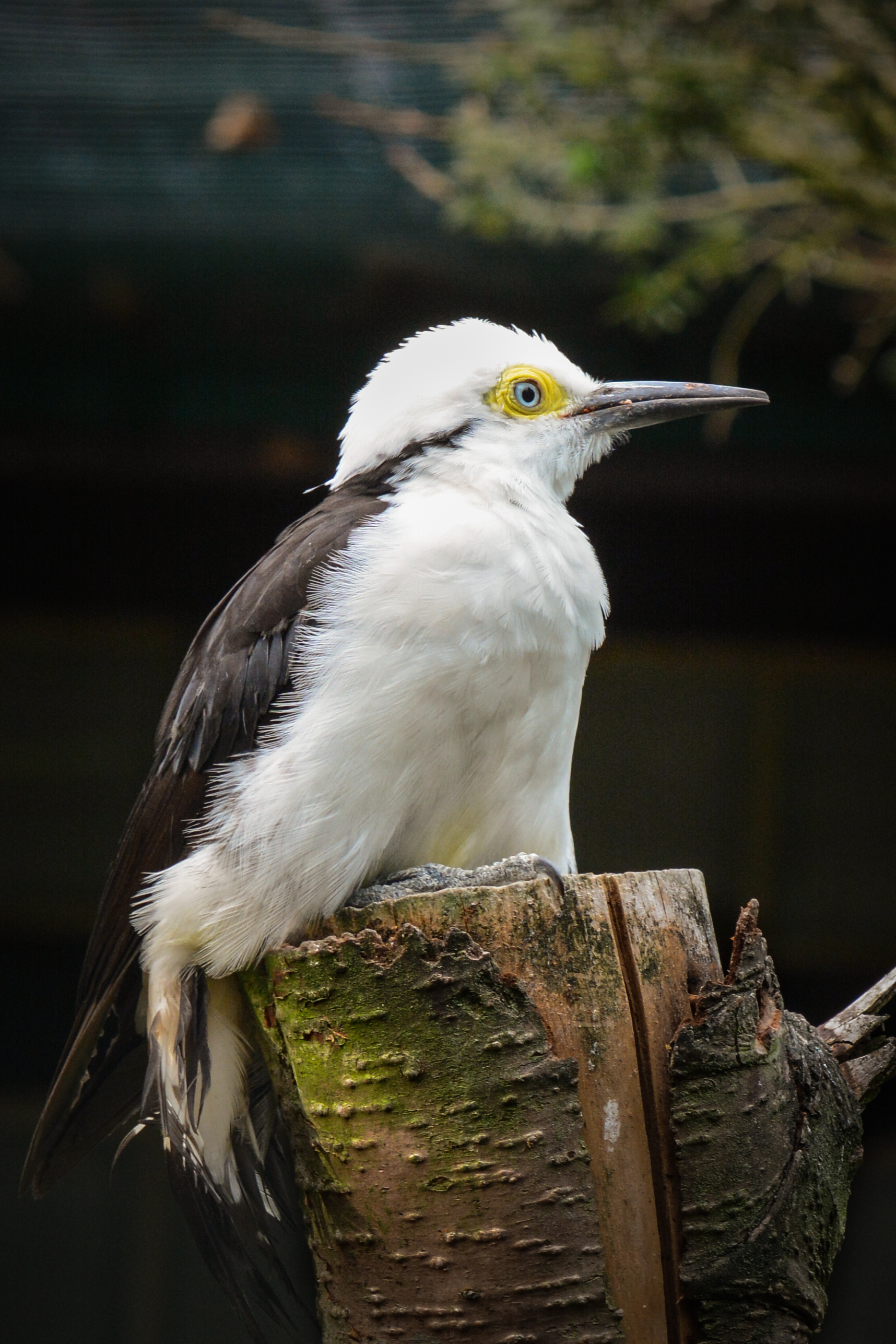
White woodpecker at Weltvogelpark Walsrode, Germany

This woodpecker grows to a length of 24 to 29 cm (9.4 to 11.4 in) and weighs around 108 g (3.8 oz), with a range of 98 to 131 g (3.5 to 4.6 oz). It is one of the largest Melanerpes woodpeckers along with the Jamaican woodpecker and Lewis' woodpecker. The mantle, back, wings and tail of the adult are black, the flight feathers being brownish-black above and the underside of the wings being greyish-black. The crown, face, rump and underparts are white, sometimes with some buff shading. The male has some yellowing of the breast and nape which the female lacks, and both sexes have a certain amount of yellow on the belly. A narrow black stripe runs from behind the eye to the nape. There is a bare ring of yellow skin around the eye which has a yellowish iris. The beak is long and grey, paler near the base, and the legs are grey. Juveniles are browner and less glossy than the adults, with the pale areas being buff rather than white. The orbital ring on juveniles is grey rather than yellow, and both sexes may have some yellow on the nape.

== Distribution and habitat ==
The white woodpecker has a large distribution in South America to the east of the Andes. Its range extends from Suriname and French Guiana, through much of Brazil to southeastern Peru, Bolivia, Paraguay, Uruguay and northern Argentina. It is found at altitudes of up to about 2,000 m (6,600 ft), and is non-migratory, but prone to making short distance movements. Its habitat is forest edges, open dry woodland, wooded savannah, scrubland with scattered trees, plantations, orchards, parkland and mangroves. It is opportunistic and adaptable, being seen in city suburbs, and expanding its range into areas of felled timber.

== Ecology ==
Groups of up to ten white woodpeckers are sometimes seen flying with floppy wing-beats in procession. The diet is varied and includes fruits, berries and seeds, the bird being a significant disperser of some species of seed. It forages in noisy family groups and also raids wild bee and wasp nests, feeding on the adult insects, larvae and honey. It breeds between September and November. It may sometimes nest communally, but very little is known of its breeding habits.

== Status ==
M. candidus has an extremely large range estimated at over 10,000,000 km^{2} (3,900,000 mi^{2}), and seems to be extending its range at the southern end of its distribution. Although it is a generally uncommon bird with a somewhat patchy distribution, the total population is thought to be increasing, and the International Union for Conservation of Nature has assessed its conservation status as being of "least concern".
