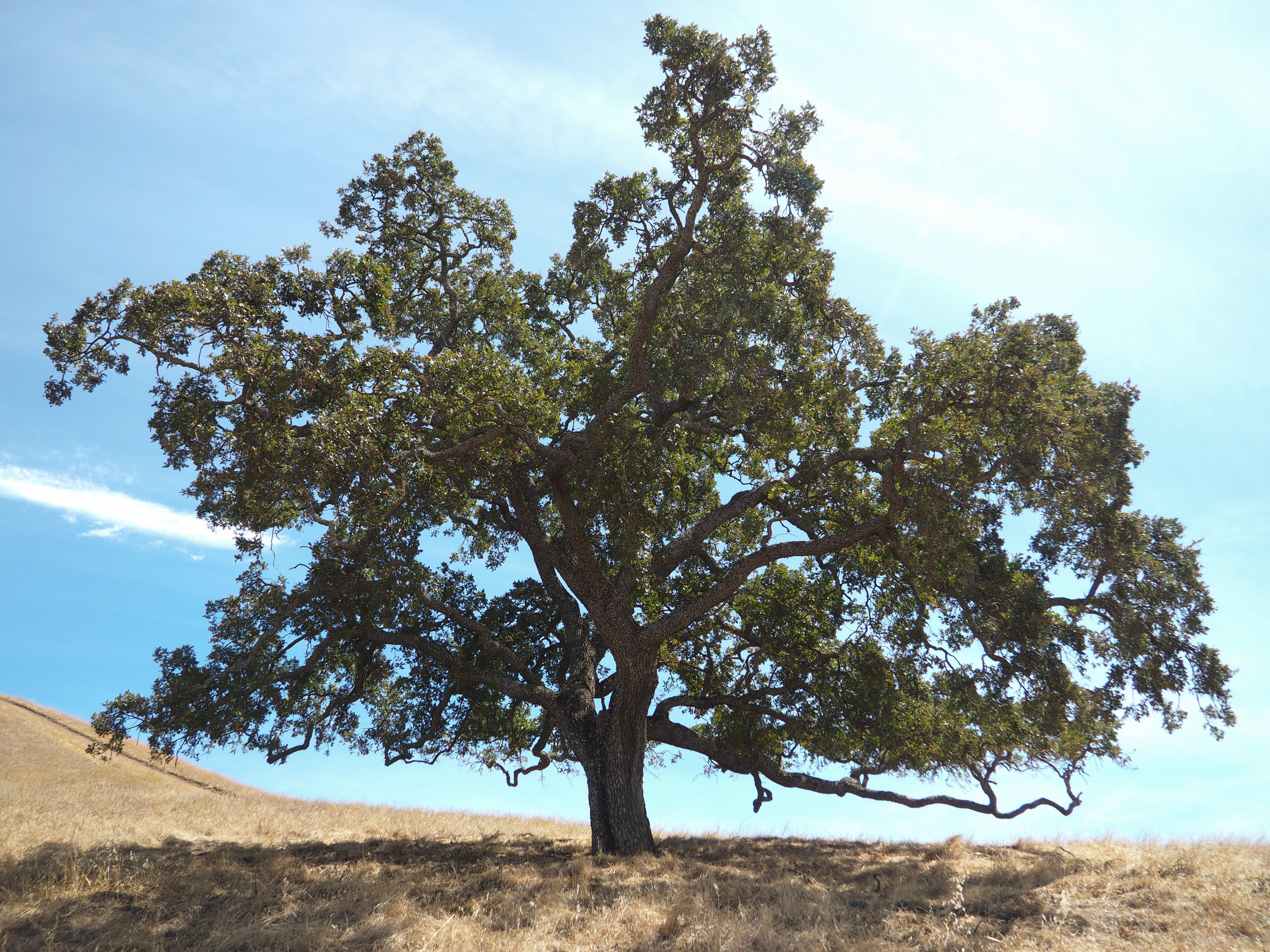
- Valley Oak on Mount Diablo.

Conservation status
- Near Threatened (IUCN 3.1)

Scientific classification
- Kingdom: Plantae
- Clade: Tracheophytes
- Clade: Angiosperms
- Clade: Eudicots
- Clade: Rosids
- Order: Fagales
- Family: Fagaceae
- Genus: Quercus
- Subgenus: Quercus subg. Quercus
- Section: Quercus sect. Quercus
- Species: Q. lobata

Binomial name
- Quercus lobata Née
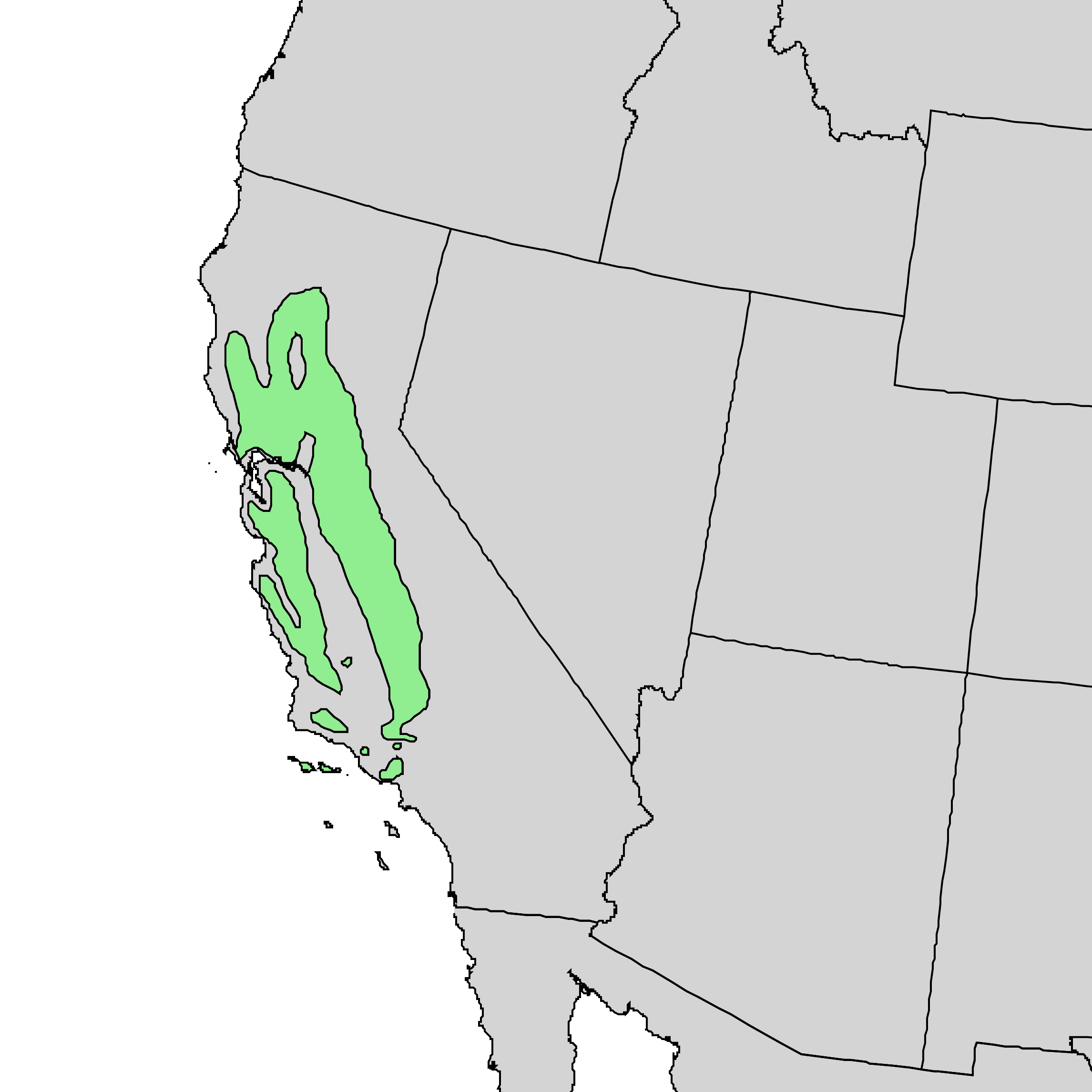
- Natural range of Quercus lobata

Synonyms
- List: Quercus hindsiana Benth. ex Dippel; Quercus hindsii Benth.; Quercus longiglanda Torr. & Frém.; Quercus lyrata Spreng.

= Quercus lobata =

Species of oak tree

Quercus lobata, commonly called the valley oak or roble, is a deciduous oak endemic to California. It is among the largest North American oaks, sometimes exceeding 100 ft in height and developing a broad, spreading crown. It grows in interior valleys and foothills from Siskiyou to San Diego counties, where it is a characteristic species of valley oak woodlands, savannahs and riparian forests. Mature trees have extensive root systems, including deep tap roots capable of reaching buried soil moisture to help it survive California's long, dry Mediterranean summers. It can live for hundreds of years.

The species is classified as Near Threatened by the IUCN as much of its former habitat has been converted to agriculture and urban development, and successful recruitment of young trees is limited in many populations. It has deeply lobed leaves and long, slender acorns.

== Description ==
The valley oak may surpass 30 meters (98 feet) in height, with a sturdy trunk possibly exceeding 3 m (10 ft) in diameter, and growing over four feet per year when provided with sufficient water. The "Henley Oak", in Covelo, California, is the tallest known valley oak, at 47 m (153 ft).

The branches have an irregular, spreading and arching appearance. During autumn, the leaves turn a yellow to light orange color but become brown later in the season. In advancing age, the branches droop. The trees have pewter-colored rippled bark.

Typically, the leaves are 5–10 centimeters (2–4 inches) long and are roundly and deeply lobed. The leaf width is approximately one half its length. Each leaf is matte green with an underneath pale green appearance; moreover, the leaf is covered with abundant soft fuzz, yielding an almost velvety feeling. When a fresh leaf is rubbed or broken, an aromatic scent is exuded, evoking a forest odor. The wood is a dull brown approaching yellow.

Mature, broad-crowned specimen

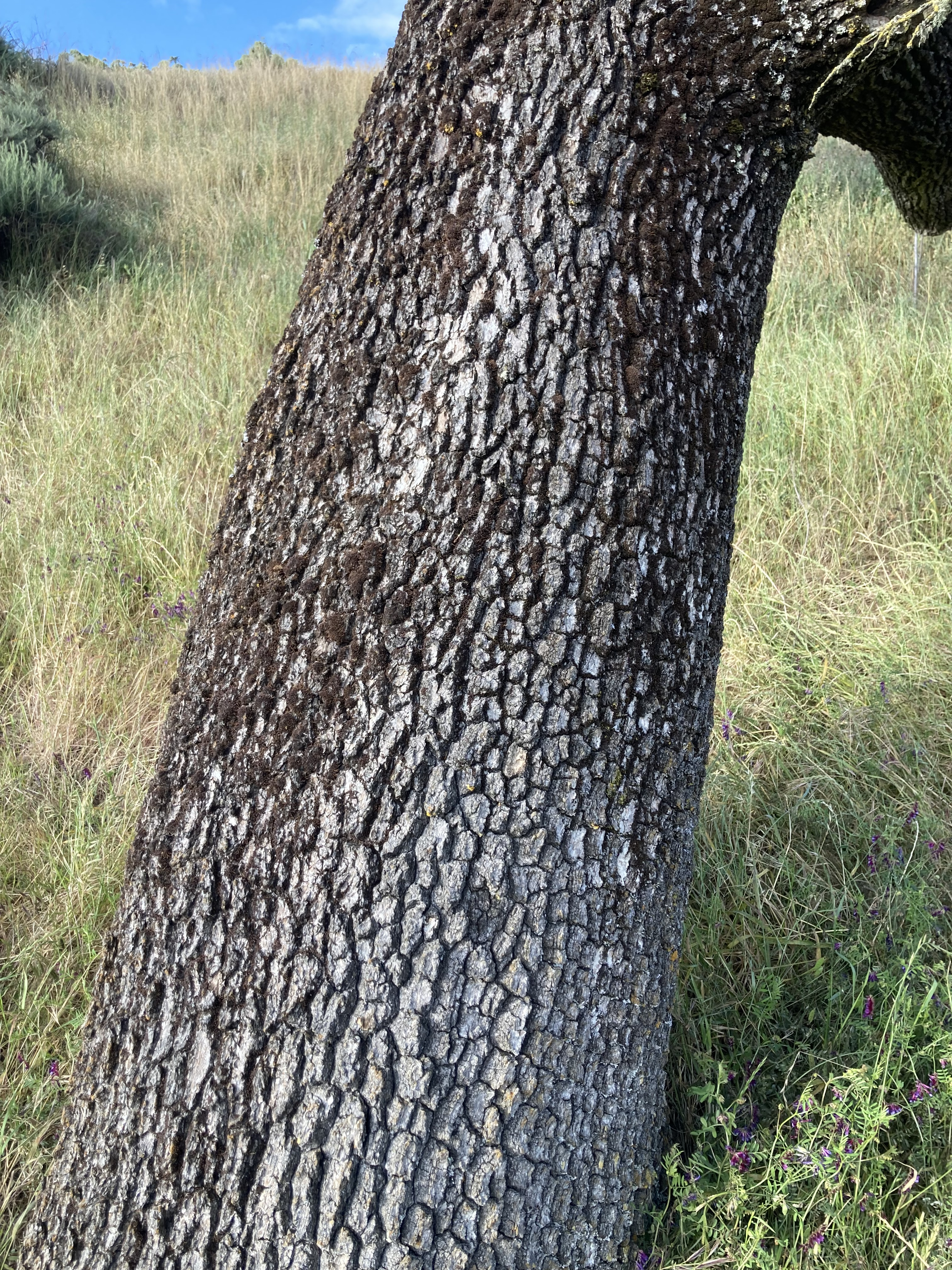
Deeply furrowed bark of a tree

The acorns, showing elongated shape and acorn cups

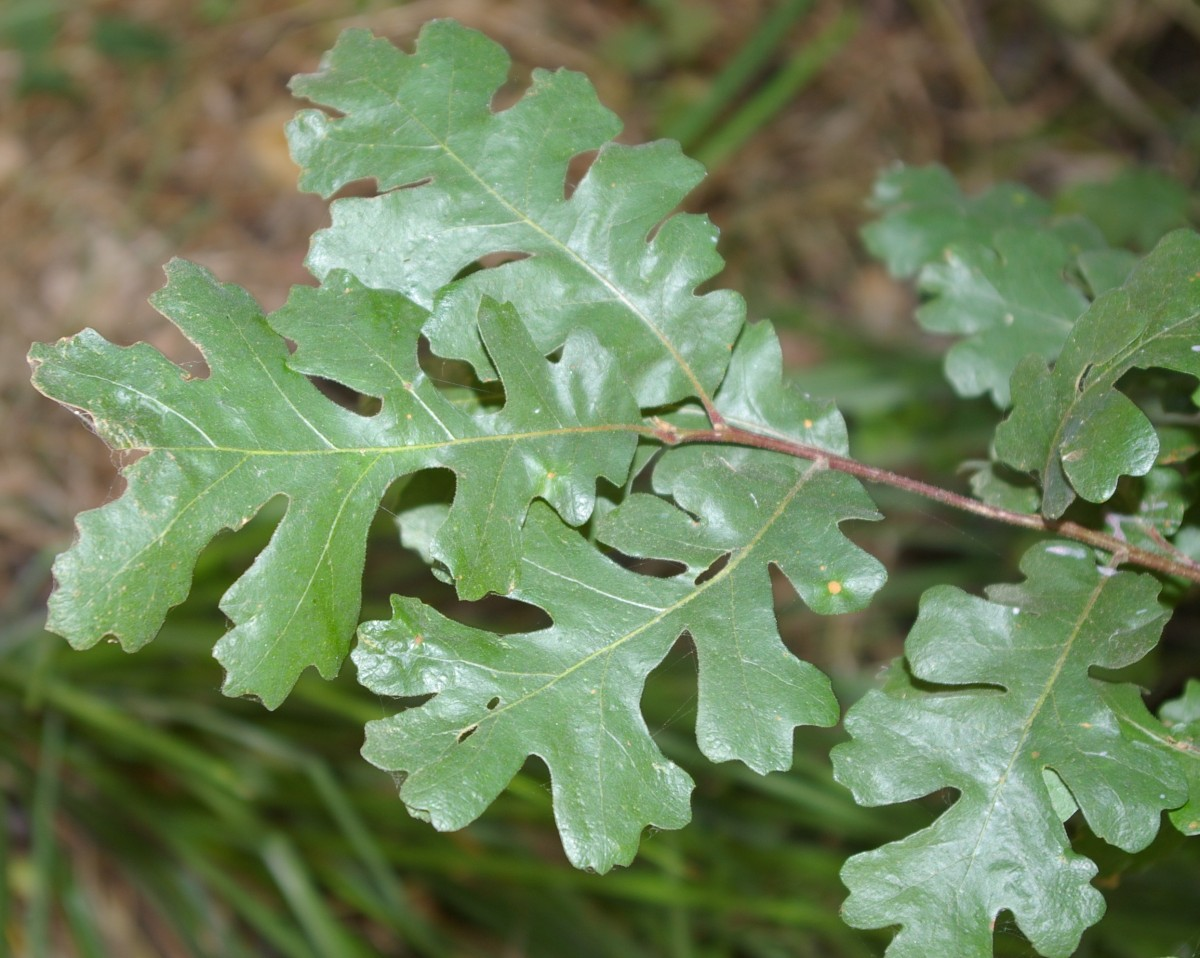
Deeply lobed leaves

The acorns are medium to dark brown and are long (3 to 5 cm (1 1/4 to 2 in)) and slender (1.2 to 2 cm (1/2 to 3/4 in)). The caps have deep stippling and are found most often as singlets, but occasionally as doublets. The acorns ripen from October to November. Viable acorns germinate in their first winter, and none remain by mid-winter.

== Taxonomy ==
Valley oak is of the white oak evolutionary lineage, which is officially known as the section Quercus in subgenus Quercus. This section comprises numerous oaks from California and elsewhere, which species share similar leaves, acorns, bark and wood pulp. Early settlers used a variety of common names for the valley oak including: white oak, bottom oak, swamp oak, water oak and mush oak. The Spaniards, because the tree looked like the white oaks in Europe, called the tree "roble".

The Concow tribe call the acorns lō-ē' (Konkow language).

== Distribution and habitat ==
Valley oak tolerates cool wet winters and hot dry summers, but requires abundant water. It is most abundant in rich deep soils of valley floors below 600 meters (2000 feet) in elevation. Valley oak is found in dense riparian forests, open foothill woodlands and valley savannas. Commonly associated trees are coast live oak, interior live oak, blue oak, California black walnut, California sycamore and gray pine.

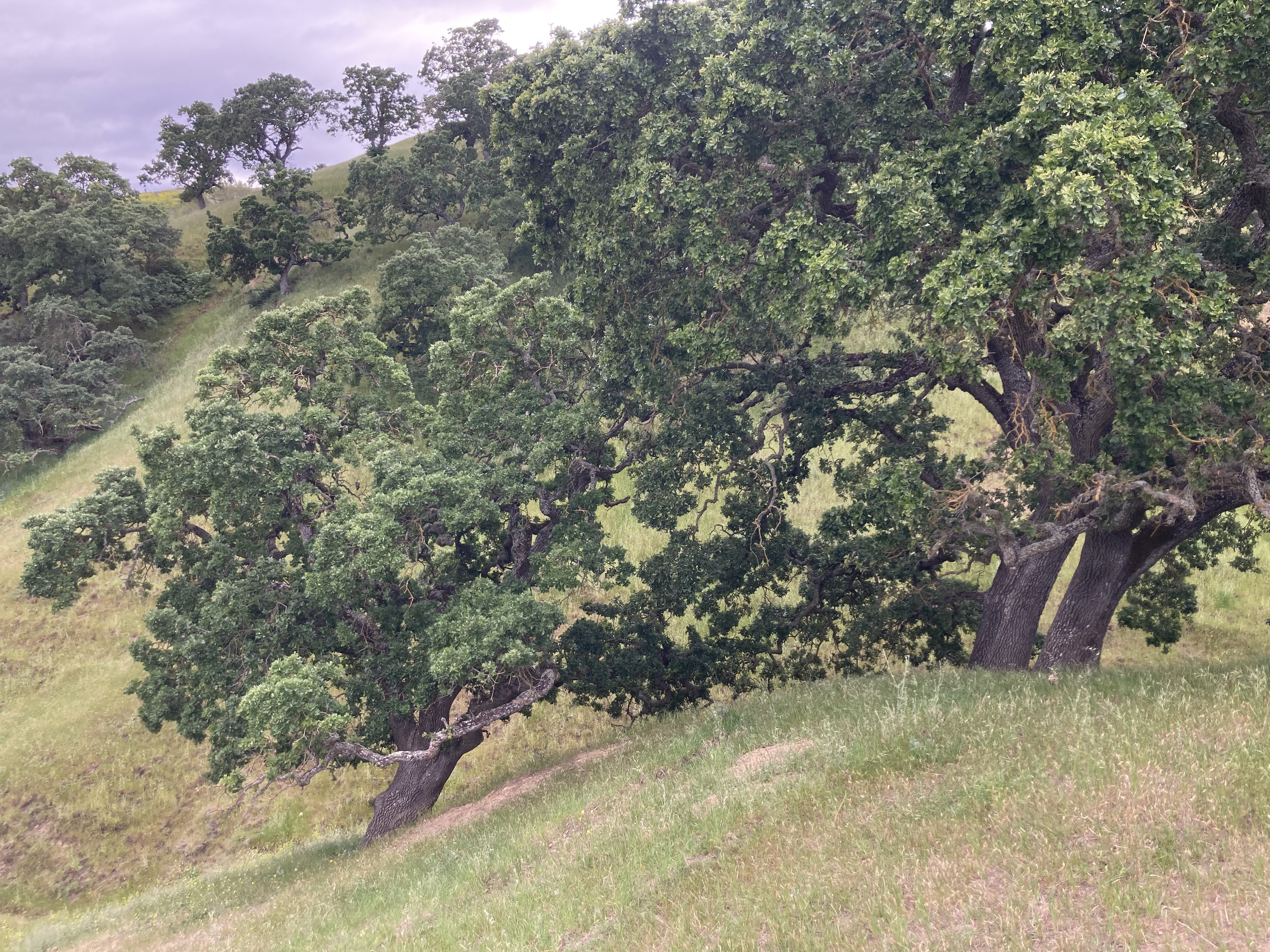
Typical savannah habitat

The valley oak is widely distributed in: the California Central Valley; many smaller valleys such as the San Fernando Valley (original Spanish place-name from oak savannah), Santa Clarita Valley, Conejo Valley, and Santa Ynez Valley; the Inner Coast Ranges south of the Eel River; and the Transverse Ranges from the Tehachapi Mountains to the Simi Hills, Santa Susana Mountains. It is also present on Santa Cruz Island and Catalina Island in the Pacific Ocean. Some of the most picturesque stands are found in Sonoma Valley, Round Valley in Mendocino County and the southern Salinas Valley near the up-river reaches of the Salinas River.

== Ecology ==
=== Reproduction ===
Valley oak is wind pollinated and its acorns mature in one growing season. The acorns of Q. lobata are recalcitrant, meaning they are intolerant of drying or cold. they can germinate as soon as they fall from the tree, and occasionally germinate while still on the tree. Seed-caching animals, such as California Scrub Jays and California ground squirrels can aid in the germination of seeds by burying them underground where they are less likely to be consumed. The seeds are most likely to sprout when buried under 2-4 inches of soil.

Establishment of seedlings and saplings can be low. Besides acorn predation, above-ground herbivory by pocket gophers and cattle, competition from annual grasses for water can contribute to sapling mortality. Once a sapling grows above the browse line, mortality rates drop off. Seedlings grow best in partial shade or on northern slopes.

A sapling at Briones Regional park

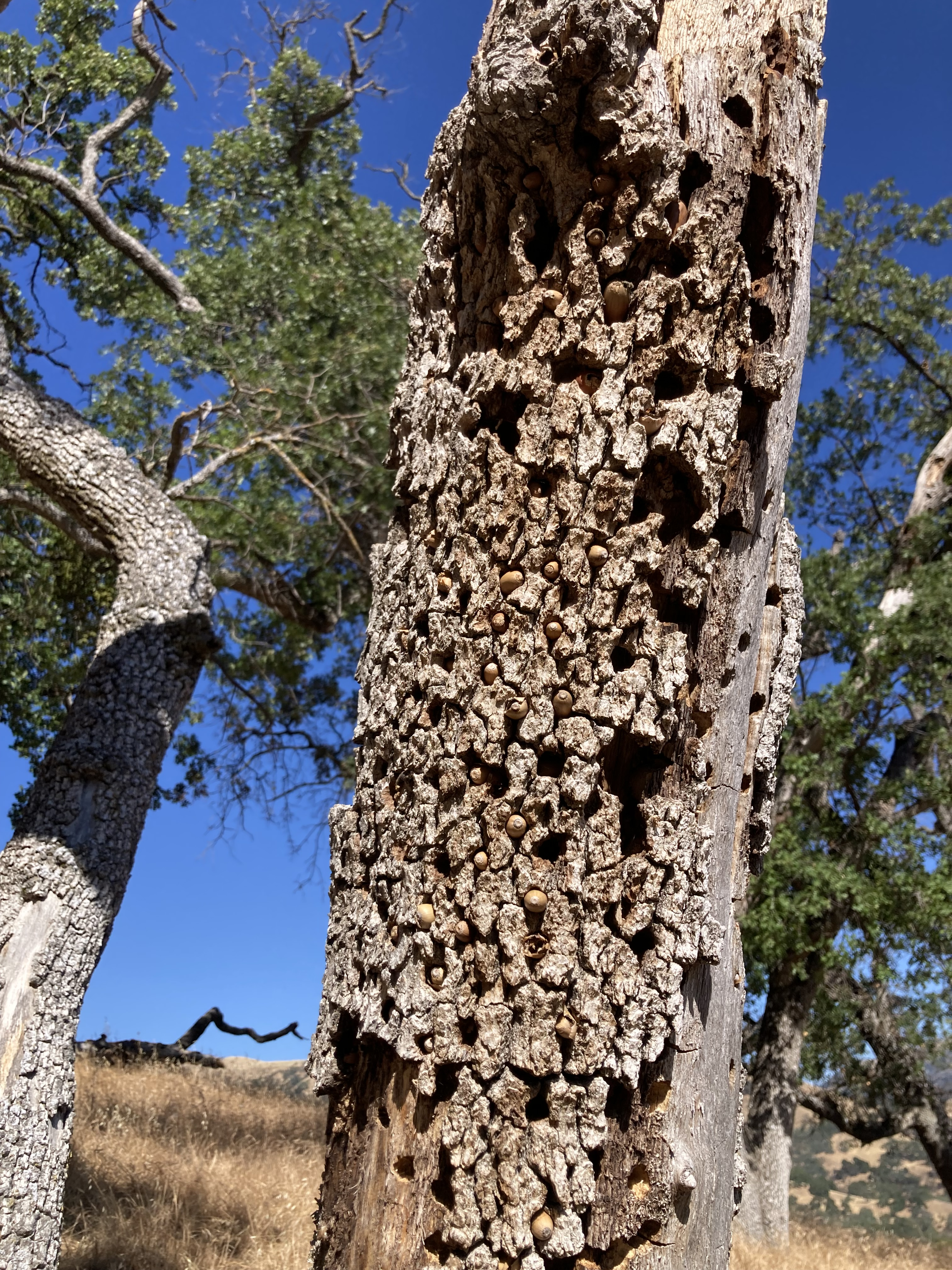
Acorn woodpeckers store acorns in Q. lobata bark.

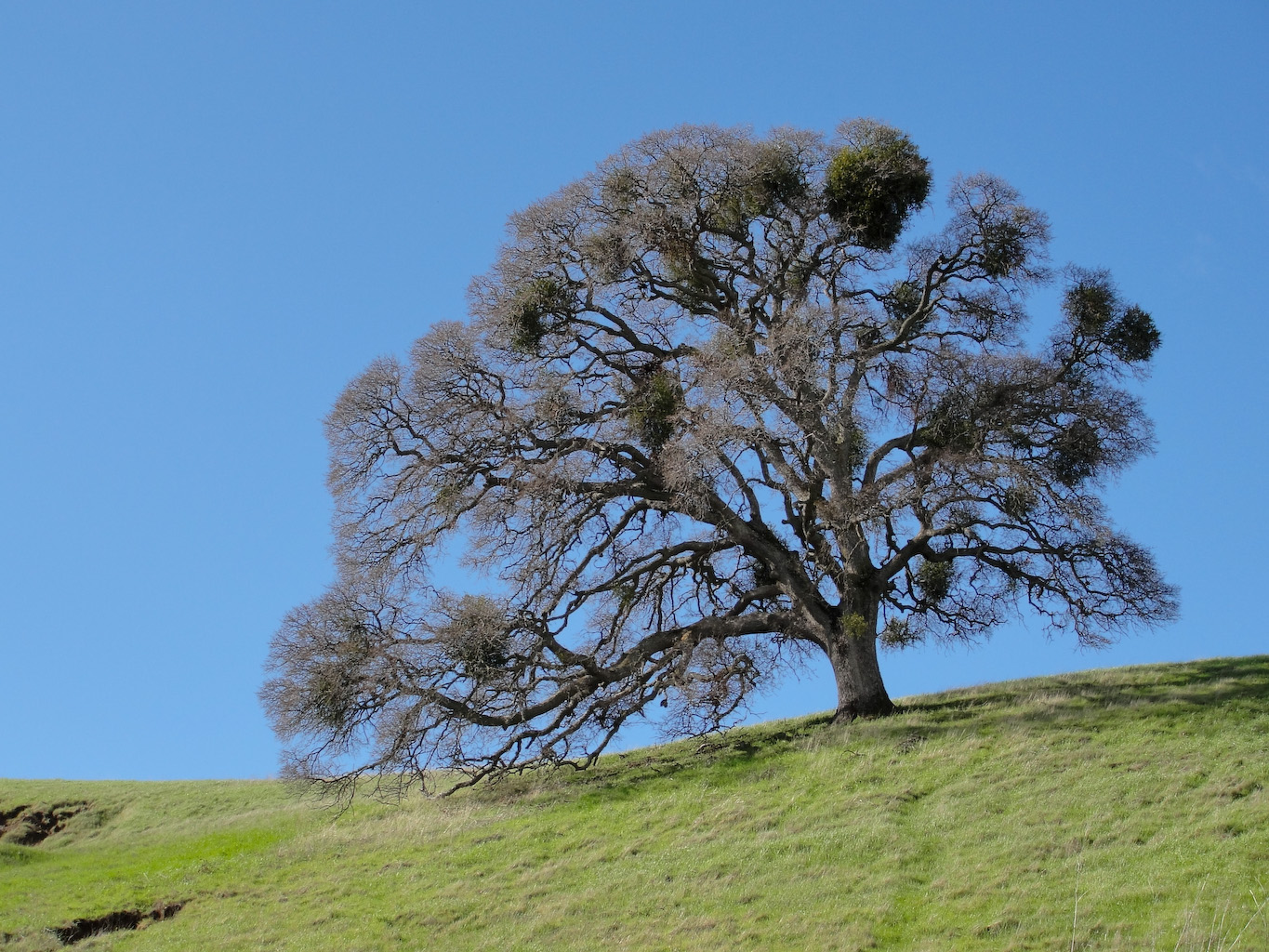
Valley oak is often afflicted by mistletoe, Phoradendron villosum

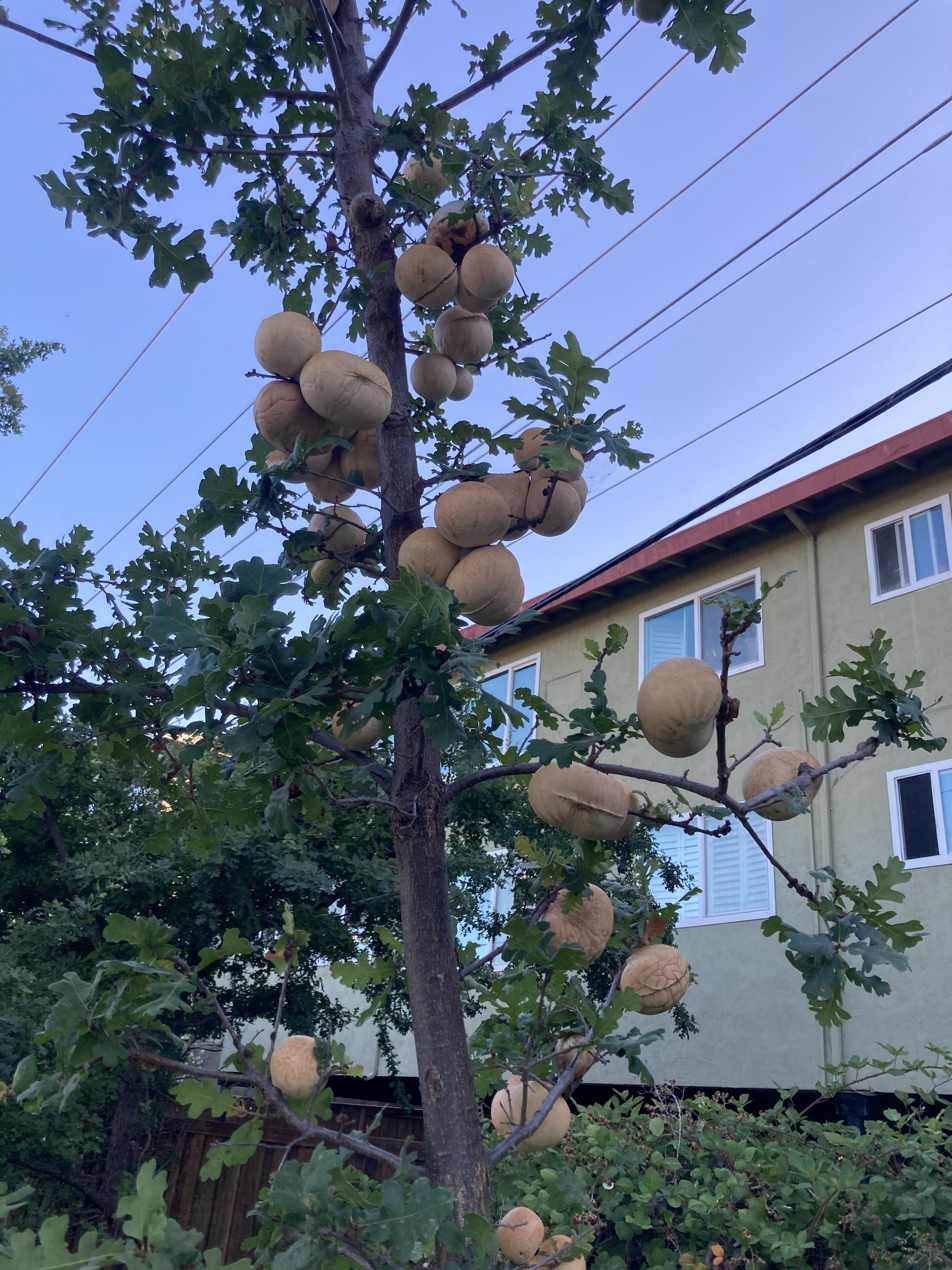
Oak apples are often formed by the gall wasp Andricus quercuscalifornicus

=== Fire ecology ===
Valley oaks can tolerate low- to mid-severity wildfires, as historically valley oak woodlands burned on a yearly basis. Young saplings and seedlings may be top-killed, while large specimens' thick bark provides resistance to fire. Smaller trees can resprout from the root crown, while larger trees tend to put out epicormic sprouts after a fire. Fire helps maintain valley oak habitat and limit the spread of advancing Coulter and Ponderosa pines. Fire scars can damage trees and provide an entry point for heart-rot fungi. Acorns buried by California scrub jays usually survive fires and these can aid in oak woodland regeneration.

=== Wildlife interactions ===
A variety of mammals and birds eat the acorns, including the acorn woodpecker, California scrub jay, yellow-billed magpie, California ground squirrel, black tailed deer, feral pigs and cattle. The acorns are also attacked by bruchid beetles, but can survive moderate levels of infestation. Swainson's hawks use large valley oaks as nesting sites and they are a preferred foraging substrate for Bullock's oriole and the house wren.

Globular galls are frequently attached to twigs of mature specimens of valley oak. These house the larval stage of small indigenous wasps Andricus quercuscalifornicus. A related wasp species, Feron kingi, produces small red conical galls on leaf surfaces. The valley oak is the only known food plant of Chionodes petalumensis caterpillars. Oak mistletoe is a common hemiparasite of the valley oak, and forms conspicuous green clumps that are especially visibly in winter when the tree has lost its leaves.

== Uses ==
The acorns are sweet and edible; Native Americans including the Southern Paiute people roasted them and ground the edible portion into meal to make into bread and mush.

Difficulties in acquiring valley oak wood as well as issues stemming from its drying such as cracking and warping have shifted its consumption from a general purpose lumber to a primarily niche product. Valley oak wood has a small, but significant market for use in cabinetry though, and is also suitable for hardwood flooring. Tyloses present in the pores of valley oak wood increase its impermeability to fluids allowing it to be used in the production of water-tight vessels. Such vessels include wine barrels where valley oak wood sees limited role in the composition of and where it has similar properties to other white oaks such as a reduced tannin load compared to the red oaks and an open grain that allows for an increased transfer of oxygen.

== Observational history ==
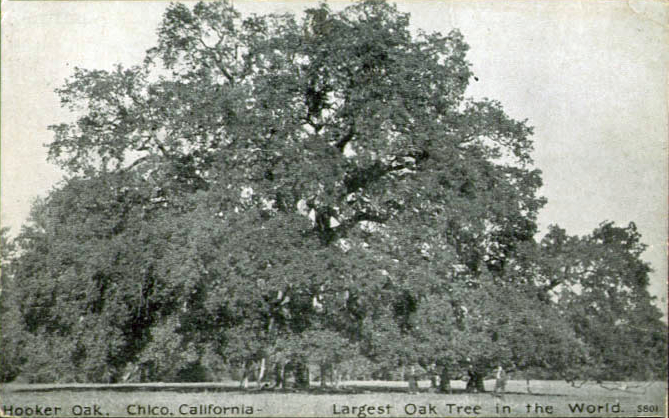
The Hooker Oak, Chico, California (c. 1910)

In 1792, the English explorer George Vancouver noted on his expedition through the Santa Clara Valley, after seeing an expanse of valley oaks:

For about twenty miles it could only be compared to a park which had originally been closely planted with the true old English oak; the underwood, that had probably attended its early growth, had the appearance of having been cleared away and left the stately lords of the forest in complete possession of the soil which was covered with luxuriant foliage.

In the year 1861, William Henry Brewer, the chief botanist for the first California Geological Survey wrote of the valley oaks that he saw in Monterey County:

First I passed through a wild canyon, then over hills covered with oats, with here and there trees—oaks and pines. Some of these oaks were noble ones indeed. How I wish one stood in our yard at home....I measured one [valley oak] with wide spreading and cragged branches, that was 26.5 feet in circumference. Another had a diameter of over six feet, and the branches spread over 75 feet each way. I lay beneath its shade a little while before going on.

The Hooker Oak of Chico, California, was once considered the largest-known valley oak. When it fell on May 1, 1977, it was nearly 30 m (100 ft) and 8.8 m (29 ft) in circumference at 2.4 m (8 ft) from the ground.

== See also ==
- California oak woodland
- List of Quercus species
