= Bernhard Christian Otto =

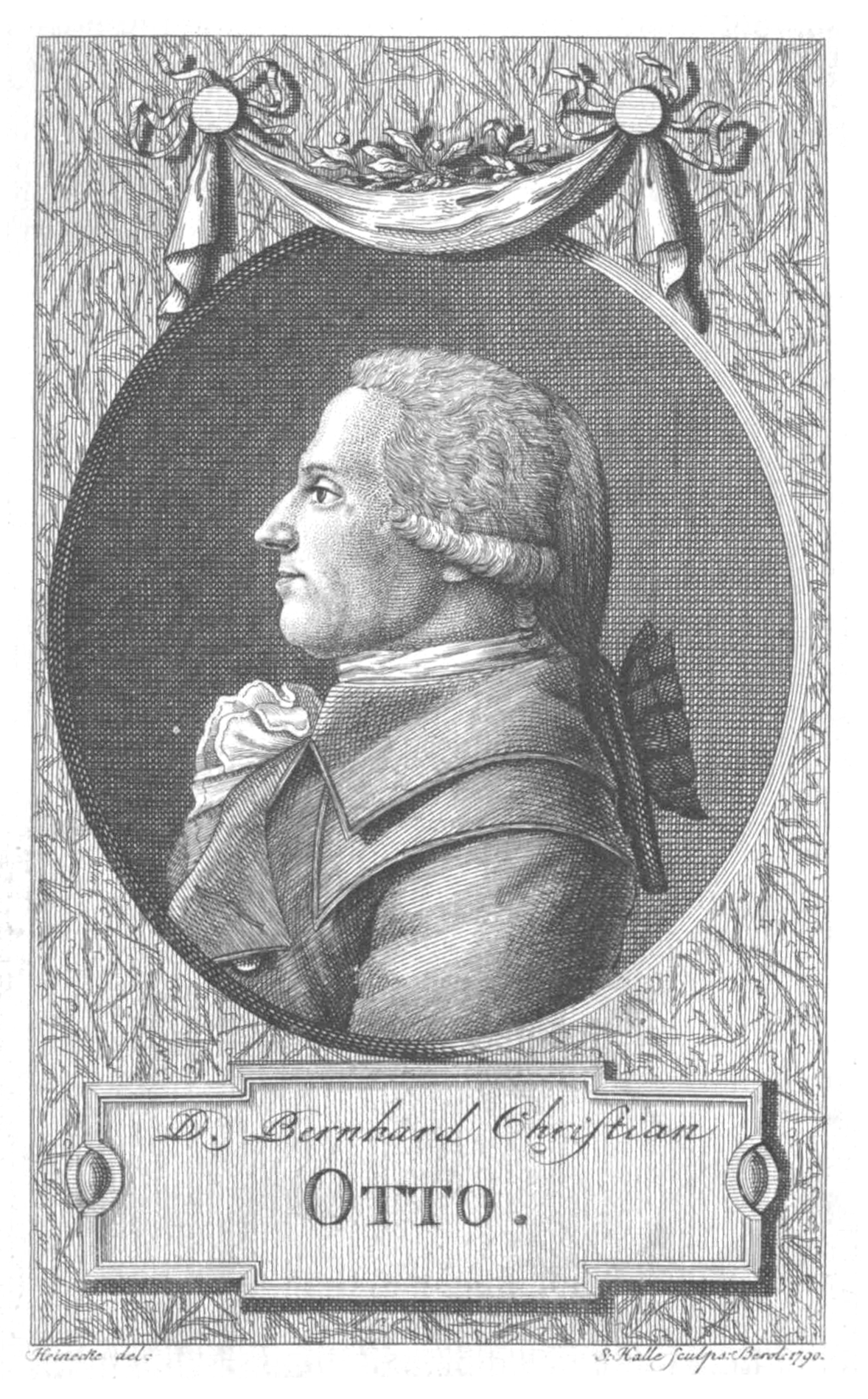

Bernhard Christian Otto (6 March 1745 – 5 November 1835) was a German medical doctor, professor of medicine, naturalist and economist.

Otto was born in Niepars near Stralsund to Pastor Gotthard Joachim Jacob Otto of Niepars and his wife Agnese Regina, daughter of Pastor Dionisius Casper Droysen (died 1765) of Dersekow. He studied medicine at the University of Göttingen and received a doctorate in 1771. In 1772 he became a teacher at the Greifswald medical faculty where he gave lectures in surgery and delivery for midwives and surgeons. From 1776 he also offered lectures in natural history and became a professor of natural history and economics in 1781, while also managing the botanical garden. He also served as rector at the University of Greifswald before moving to Frankfurt as a professor of medicine at the Alma Mater Viadrina in 1788. In 1792 he took up the position vacated upon the death of professor Peter Immanuel Hartmann. He retired when the university was moved to Breslau and stayed on in Frankfurt where he continued research. He translated several works from French to German including the works on birds by Buffon, in the process also assigning binomial names to some of the species. Thus Otto became the binomial authority for the "Cayenne black and white woodpecker" Picus candidus. He became blind in later life.
