= Muchucux =

Coordinates: 20°28′37″N 088°27′03″W

Muchucux is a community in Chankom Municipality in the state of Yucatán, Mexico.

== See also ==
- Chichen Itza
- Uayma
- Valladolid, Yucatán
