= Dzitás Municipality =

Municipality in the Mexican state of Yucatán

Dzitás
- Municipality
- Region 6 Oriente #030

- Location of the Municipality in Mexico
- Coordinates: 20°50′22″N 88°31′34″W
- Country: Mexico
- State: Yucatán
- Mexico Ind.: 1821
- Yucatán Est.: 1824

Government
  - Type: 2012–2015
  - Municipal President: José Crescencio Canul Polanco

Area
  - Total: 456.03 km^{2} (176.07 sq mi)
- Elevation: 32 m (105 ft)

Population (2010)
  - Total: 3,540
  - Density: 7.76/km^{2} (20.1/sq mi)
  - Demonym: Umanense
- Time zone: UTC-6 (Central Standard Time)
- INEGI Code: 101
- Major Airport: Merida (Manuel Crescencio Rejón) International Airport
- IATA Code: MID
- ICAO Code: MMMD

Dzitás Municipality (In the Yucatec Maya Language: “plant name: mamay or plantain") is a municipality in the Mexican state of Yucatán containing 456.03 km^{2} of land and is located roughly 125 km east of the city of Mérida.

== History ==
There is no accurate data on when the town was founded, though it existed before the conquest as part of the province of Cupules. At colonization, Dzitás became part of the encomienda system. What is now known as Dzitas was divided into two different encomiendos. Part was designated to Juan Rodrígez in 1549 and the other to Diego de Alcocer. In 1579 the first part was held by Juan Rodrígez and Diego de Alcocer and the second by Diego de Alcocer and Francisca Briceño. The parts were divided between Luis Carrillo de Albornoz and Francisco Rodríguez Montalvo in 1652 and in 1688 between Felipe Carrillo and Isabel Peraza de Ayala.

Yucatán declared its independence from the Spanish Crown in 1821, and in 1825 the area was assigned to the partition of Valladolid Municipality. In 1918 it was designated as its own municipality, but lost a portion of its area in 1931 with the creation of Quintana Roo Municipality.

In 1931 the anthropologists Robert and Margaret Park Redfield stayed in the county seat of Dzitas for extended periods and published The Folk Culture of Yucatan, and Disease and its treatment in Dzitas, Yucatan

== Governance ==
The municipal president is elected for a three-year term. The town council has four councilpersons, who serve as Secretary and councilors of public works, public monuments and markets.

== Communities ==
The head of the municipality is Dzitás, Yucatán. There are 10 populated areas of the municipality with the most important being Dzitás, Dzitcacao, Santa Rosa, Xocempich and Yaxché. The significant populations are shown below:

Community	Population
Entire Municipality (2010)	3,540
Dzitás	2826 in 2005
Xocempich	563 in 2005

== Local festivals ==
Every year from 16 to 22 January is the Festival of Santa Inés, patron saint of the town.

== Tourist attractions ==
- Church of Santa Inés, built in 1870
- Archaeological sites at Chech, Chicche, Distas, Ichmul, Lalul, Popolá and Yanxhacat
- Cenotes at Anikabil, Ceh Mukul, Chan Dzonot I, Chan Dzonot II, Chicche
