= Flora Belle Jan =

American journalist and poet

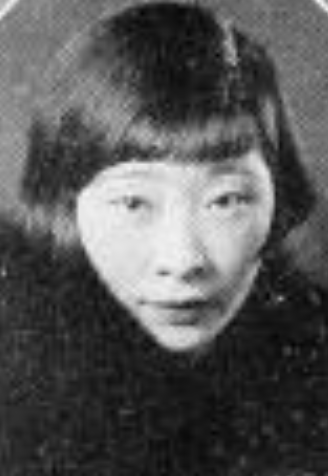
- Flora Belle Jan, from the 1927 yearbook of the University of Chicago
- Born: September 22, 1906; Fresno, California, US
- Died: January 22, 1950 (aged 43); Yuma, Arizona, US
- Occupation: Journalist

Flora Belle Jan Wang (September 22, 1906 – January 22, 1950) was an American journalist and poet. She was born in California, and lived in China from the early 1930s until 1949.

== Early life and education ==
Jan was born and raised in Fresno, California, one of the eight children of Jan Suey Ming and Yen Shee, both Chinese immigrants from Guangdong province. Her parents ran a restaurant. She was recognized as a promising writer in her teens. She represented Fresno in a beauty contest in San Francisco's Chinatown in 1925.

Jan attended Fresno State College and the University of California, Berkeley, and graduated from the University of Chicago in 1927. She was president of the Chinese Club at the University of Chicago, and she lived with sociologist Robert E. Park and his wife, social worker Clara Cahill Park.

== Career ==
Jan was a journalist, and wrote articles for the San Francisco Examiner, The Chicago Daily News, The Fresno Bee, The Shanghai Herald, and other publications. She also wrote poetry, plays, and fiction.

Jan moved with her husband and son to China in the early 1930s, and stayed there until after World War II, returning to California with her daughters in 1949. She worked for the United States Office of War Information in Beijing, and wrote for English-language newspapers and magazines.

== Publications ==
- "Lure of Spring is Here; Teachers Tell of Youthful Love; Days of Romance Recalled" (1923)
- "Ming Toy Takes Up Hiking; East Turns to West in Out Doors; Khaki Replaces Silk Today"
- "Long Trail to Chinatown; Fresno's Oriental Center is Quaint; Many Curious People Seen" (1923)
- "Chinese Girls Give Gay Ball" (1923)
- "Japanese Girls are Apt; Quick to Gain Knowledge; Music, Oratory, Dancing" (1923)
- "Love Sweet, Ah, But Pinch Hitters' Sweeter--Girls Swat Mere Fickle Mankind" (1923)
- "Impersonates Delivery Boy; Local Chinese Belle is Versatile; Also Drives Wicked Flivver" (1923)
- "Chinatown Sheiks are a Modest Lot; Eschew Slang, Love-Moaning Blues" (1924)
- "Fleet Stirs Orient Dream" (1924)
- "Two Poems" (1926)
- "Three Poems" (1928)

== Personal life and legacy ==
Flora Jan was born a United States citizen, but lost her citizenship when she married psychologist Charles Wang, a fellow alumnus of the University of Chicago. They had a son, Hanson, who was born in the United States, and two daughters, Fleur and Fiore, who were both born in China. She became a naturalized American citizen in 1932. She died in 1950, at the age of 43, while visiting her close friend Ludmelia Holstein in Yuma, Arizona. Her letters to Holstein are held by the Hoover Institution Library. They were edited and published as Unbound Spirit: Letters of Flora Belle Jan in 2009, with an introduction by Judy Yung. Her daughter Fleur Yano was a professor of physics and astronomy at California State University, Los Angeles.
