= Chankom Municipality =

Municipality in the Mexican state of Yucatán

Chankom
- Municipality
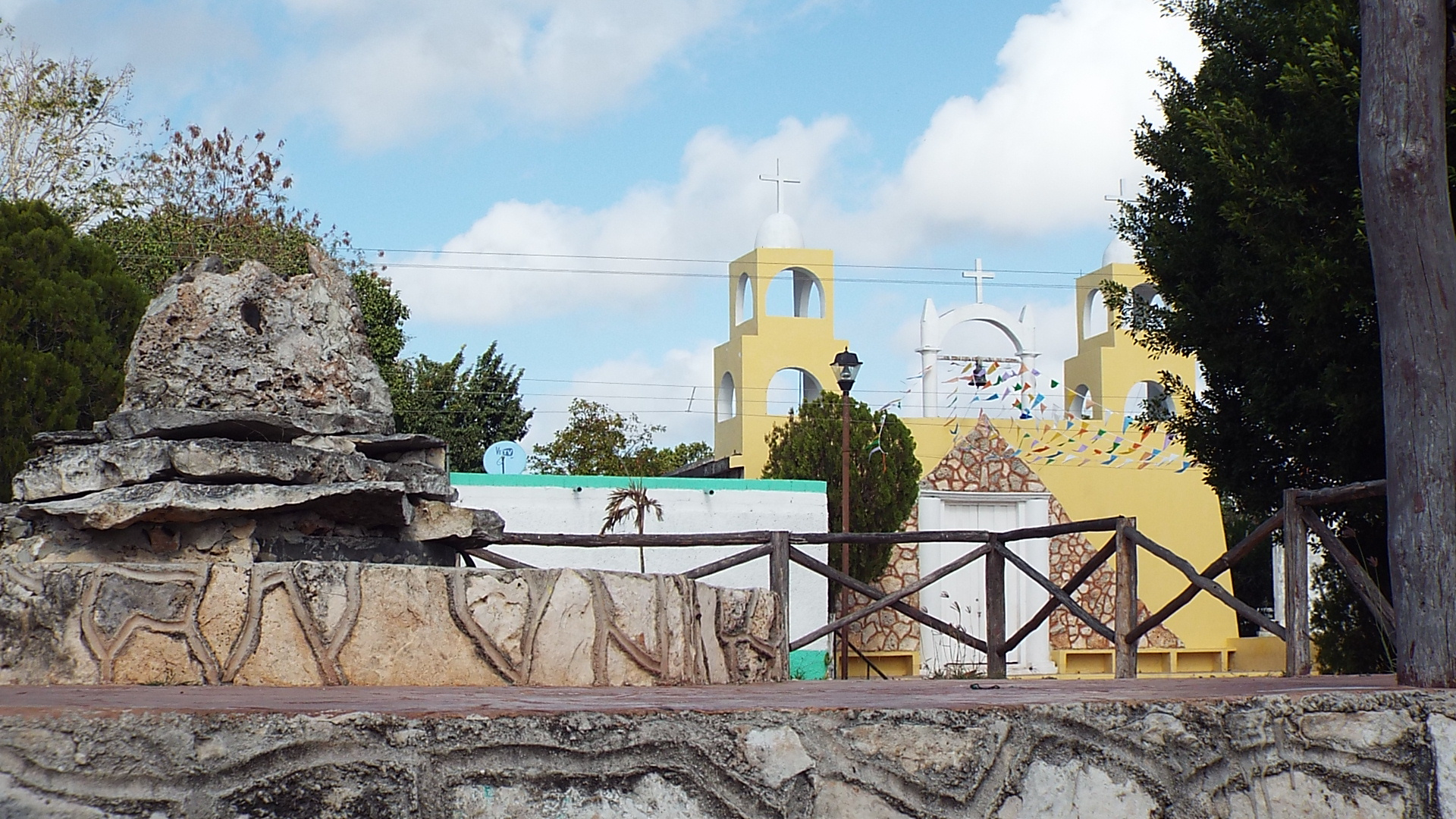

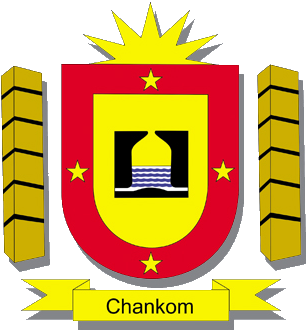
- Coat of arms

- Region 6 Oriente #017

- Location of the municipality in Mexico
- Coordinates: 20°34′05″N 88°30′48″W
- Country: Mexico
- State: Yucatán

Government
  - Type: 2012–2015
  - Municipal President: Benjamín Cime Ek

Area
  - Total: 137.95 km^{2} (53.26 sq mi)
- Elevation: 27 m (89 ft)

Population (2010)
  - Total: 4,464
- Time zone: UTC-6 (Central Standard Time)
- INEGI Code: 009
- Major Airport: Merida (Manuel Crescencio Rejón) International Airport
- IATA Code: MID
- ICAO Code: MMMD

Chankom Municipality (in the Yucatec Maya language: “little ravine”) is a municipality in the Mexican state of Yucatán containing 137.95 km^{2} of land and located roughly 135 km southeast of the city of Mérida.

== History ==
Before the arrival of the Spanish, the area was populated as evidenced by archeological sites but no specific information is known of the inhabitants nor the encomienda system. The area was depopulated by the Caste War of Yucatán and the inhabitants did not return to the area until the 1890s.

Chankom was established as a ranchería assigned to the Valladolid region in 1928. Seven years later, it was designated as its own municipality.

In 1931-1948 the anthropologists Robert and Margaret Park Redfield and Alfonso Villa Rojas stayed in the county seat of Chankom for extended periods (Villas taught there) and published Chan Kom, a Maya Village, A Village that Chose Progress, Chan Kom Revisited, and The Folk Culture of Yucatan.

In 1986-2006 the anthropologist Alicia Re Cruz stayed in Chankom and published The two Milpas of Chan Kom: scenarios of a Maya village life and a documentary, The Mayan dreams of Chan Kom: tourism, migration, and changing identities in the Yucatan.

== Governance ==
The municipal president is elected for a three-year term. The town council has four councilpersons, who serve as Secretary and councilors of policing, public services and ecology.

== Communities ==
The head of the municipality is Chankom, Yucatán. There are 17 populated places in the municipality including Chuntabil, Maykab, Muchucuxca, Nictehá, Sacpasil, San Isidro, San Juan, Santa María Koochilá, Santa Rosa, Ticimul, Tomku, Tzukmuc, Xanla, Xbohon, Xcalakdzonot, X-Cocail, Xhuaymil, Xkatún, Xkopeteil, X-Pamba, Xtamech, Xtohil, Yacbchem, and Yochotún. The significant populations are shown below:

Community	Population
Entire Municipality (2010)	4,464
Chankom	628 in 2005
Muchucuxcáh	314 in 2005
Ticimul	642 in 2005
Tzukmuc	212 in 2005
Xanlá	406 in 2005
X-Bohom	108 in 2005
X-Cocail	161 in 2005
Xkalakdzonot	770 in 2005
Xkatún	130 in 2005
Xkopteil	754 in 2005

== Local festivals ==
Every year from the 9 to 13 November the town holds a celebration for its patron saint, San Diego.

== Tourist attractions ==
- Cenote Chankom
- Cenote Kochila
- Cenote Muchucuxca
- Cenote Nicte-Ha
- Cenote Santa María
- Archaeological site Cosil
- Archaeological site Kochilá
- Archaeological site Ticimul
- Archaeological site Xcocail
