= Church of Saint Servatius =

The Church of Saint Servatius may refer to:

- St. Servatius Church, Indonesia
- Church of Saint Servatius (Valladolid), Mexico
- Basilica of Saint Servatius, Netherlands
