= Clara Cahill Park =

American social worker

- Born: Clara Belle Cahill; July 2, 1868; Michigan
- Died: October 28, 1951 (age 83); Chicago, Illinois
- Occupations: Social worker, reformer, artist, writer
- Spouse: Robert E. Park
- Children: 4, including Margaret Park Redfield
- Father: Edward Cahill
- Relatives: Robert Redfield (son-in-law); Lisa Peattie (granddaughter)

Clara Cahill Park (July 2, 1868 – October 28, 1951) was an American social worker, artist, feminist, and writer.

== Early life and education ==
Clara Belle Cahill was born in Michigan, the daughter of Edward Cahill and Lucy Crawford Cahill. Her father was an abolitionist lawyer, a Union Army veteran, and a judge on the Michigan Supreme Court. She trained as an artist at the Art Academy of Cincinnati and the Art Institute of Chicago.

== Career ==
Park was vice-president of the Massachusetts Congress of Mothers, and worked with the Massachusetts Federation of Women's Clubs to promote a public pension for widowed mothers, asking "why shouldn't the state pay the money to the mother herself to help her live in decency and bring up her own family?" The campaign was successful and a provision for widows' pensions became state law in 1913. In 1912 and 1913, she contributed several short essays to Boston Globe panel discussions on marriage and family questions such as "What is the Essential Purpose of Marriage?" and "How Do Loveless Marriages Affect Offspring?"

In 1926 and 1927 she went to Mexico to live with her daughter Margaret Park Redfield and son-in-law Robert Redfield, and her young grandchildren, while the Redfields were doing anthropological fieldwork in Tepoztlán. In 1930s she gave lectures, and exhibited pastel portraits she made in her world travels, at exhibits in Hawaii, Japan, China, South Africa, Brazil, and across the United States. In 1949 she joined her daughter Theodosia Park Breed and granddaughter Sylvia Breed in a "three generations" art show in Chicago.

== Publications ==
- "Coming to New York to Study Art" (1894, essay)
- "The Manners Tart" (1895, essay)
- "The True Story of Blackbird" (1896, article)
- "The Gnome and the Fauns" (1896, short story)
- "Native Women in Africa: Their Hard Lot in the March of Progress" (1904, pamphlet)
- "Widows’ Pension in Massachusetts" (1912, article)
- "Union for Mother Protection in Germany (1912, article)
- "To Carry on the Race" (1912, short essay)
- "Women Learn to Save" (1912, short essay)
- "The Loveless Home" (1913, short essay)
- "An Almost Unlimited Field" (1913, short essay)
- "Helping the Widowed Mother Keep a Home" (1913, article)
- "Motherhood and Pensions" (1913, article)
- "Pensions for Mothers" (1913, article)
- "Women are More Frugal than Men" (1914, short essay)

== Personal life ==
Clara Cahill married sociologist Robert E. Park in 1894. They had four children. She was effectively a single parent for long stretches, as her husband lived in another state to teach or traveled abroad for study; she found the arrangement difficult, writing to her husband that "I have been imposed on, not intentionally, but carelessly and veritably". Her husband died in 1944, and she died in 1951, at the age of 83, in Chicago.
