= Uayma Municipality =

Municipality in the Mexican state of Yucatán

Uayma
- Municipality
- Principal Church of Uayma, Yucatán

- Region 6 Oriente #099

- Location of the Municipality in Mexico
- Coordinates: 20°43′N 88°19′W
- Country: Mexico
- State: Yucatán
- Mexico Ind.: 1821
- Yucatán Est.: 1824
- Municipality Est: 1918

Government
  - Type: 2012–2015
  - Municipal President: Juana Neyvi Chi Castro

Area
  - Total: 196.72 km^{2} (75.95 sq mi)
- Elevation: 28 m (92 ft)

Population (2010)
  - Total: 3,782
  - Density: 19.23/km^{2} (49.79/sq mi)
  - Demonym: Umanense
- Time zone: UTC-6 (Central Standard Time)
- Postal Code: 97390
- Area code: 988
- INEGI Code: 099
- Major Airport: Merida (Manuel Crescencio Rejón) International Airport
- IATA Code: MID
- ICAO Code: MMMD

Uayma Municipality (In the Yucatec Maya Language: “water not here”) is a municipality in the Mexican state of Yucatán containing 196.72 km^{2} of land and located roughly 165 km east of the city of Mérida.

== History ==
During the Classic period of the Maya civilization, the ancient Maya city of Ichmul de Morley (Mut'ul), flourished as a regional power and seat of a ruling dynasty.

There is no accurate data on when the town was founded, though it existed before the conquest and in antiquity belonged to the chieftainship of Cupules. At colonization, Uayma became part of the encomienda system with the first recorded encomendero as Juan Bellido 1549-1579. From him it passed to Martín de Güemes 1579; Gaspar González, Pedro de Valencia, and Pedro de Valencia II 1607; Francisco Menéndez Morán 1683-1688; and thereafter to Joaquin Menéndez.

Yucatán declared its independence from the Spanish Crown in 1821 and in 1825, the area was assigned to the partition of Valladolid Municipality. During the Caste War of Yucatán the city was abandoned but repopulated after federal troops regained possession of it. In 1918, it was designated as its own municipality.

== Governance ==
The municipal president is elected for a three-year term. The town council has four councilpersons, who serve as Secretary and councilors of public works, education, nomenclature and public monuments.

== Communities ==
The head of the municipality is Uayma, Yucatán. There are 16 populated areas of the municipality. The most notable, after the seat, include San Lorenzo, Santa María Aznar, and Xkatbe. The significant populations are shown below:

Community	Population
Entire Municipality (2010)	3,782
San Lorenzo	47 in 2005
Santa María Aznar	514 in 2005
Uayma	2434 in 2005

== Local festivals ==
Every year on 3 May the festival of the Holy Cross is celebrated and on 15 May the feast of San Isidro Labrador, the town's patron saint is held. Also on 4 August a fiesta for Santo Domingo is recognized.

== Tourist attractions ==
- The ex-convent and Church of Santo Domingo, built in the seventeenth century, destroyed during the Caste War, and rebuilt in the 19th century is one of the most famous structures of the municipality.
