= James M. Redfield =

American classical philologist (1935–2026)

- Born: 1935
- Died: May 28, 2026 (aged 90–91)
- Education: University of Chicago; New College, Oxford
- Children: James Adam Redfield
- Relatives: Robert Redfield (father); Robert E. Park (grandfather)

James M. Redfield (May 2, 1935 – May 28, 2026) was an American academic. He made numerous contributions to current scholarship on Homer and Herodotus. His most notable work was Nature and Culture in the Iliad: The Tragedy of Hector (University of Chicago Press, 1975), an anthropological reading of the Iliad with the stated goal of analyzing Hector's role in the work.

== Life and career ==
Redfield's father, Robert Redfield, was also a University of Chicago professor, teaching anthropology and ethnolinguistics, and serving as Dean of the Division of the Social Sciences from 1934 to 1946. His maternal grandfather, Robert E. Park, was also a University of Chicago professor, teaching sociology from 1914 to 1933 and playing a leading role in the Chicago School of sociology.

James Redfield was a member of the Department of Classical Languages and Literature and the Committee on Social Thought at Chicago. He took his undergraduate degree from the University of Chicago in 1954, studied at New College, Oxford from 1956 to 1958, and returned to Chicago for his Ph.D. in 1961. He was appointed a professor at The College at the University of Chicago in 1976. He retired in 2016, and taught as an emeritus faculty until 2023.

He held the distinction (along with four other professors) of having been awarded the University's Quantrell Award for Excellence in Undergraduate Teaching twice. He won it in 1965 and again in 1987.

His son, also named James Redfield, is a professor at Saint Louis University.

Redfield died on May 28, 2026.

== Publications ==
- Nature and Culture in the Iliad: The Tragedy of Hector (University of Chicago Press, 1975)
- The Locrian Maidens: Love and Death in Greek Italy (University of Chicago Press, 2004)
- Plato’s Seventh Letter. Translation and Commentary (Hackett, 2026).
