= Ichmul de Morley =

Maya site in Yucatán, Mexico

- Mut'ul
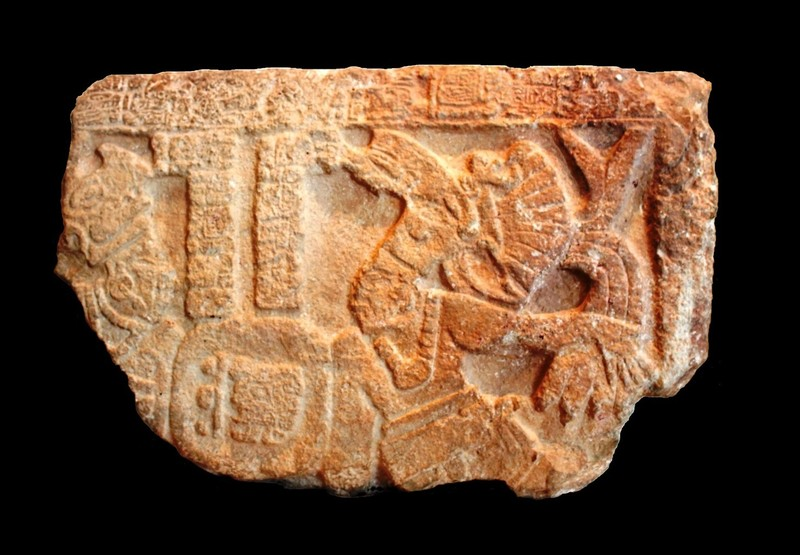
- Panel 2 from Ichmul de Morley showing two rulers as ball players.

- Location within Mexico Location within Yucatán (state)
- Type: Ancient Maya site
- Periods: Late Classic - Early Postclassic
- Cultures: Maya civilization
- Location: Mexico

History
- Built: 600 - 1000 AD

Site notes
- Discovered: 1919
- Public access: Closed

Ichmul de Morley, originally named Mut'ul, is a Maya culture archaeological site located in the municipality of Uayma, in eastern Yucatán, Mexico. It was a Maya city that reached its peak during the Late Classic and Early Postclassic periods of Mesoamerica, when it became an important center of political power in the region and the seat of a ruling dynasty. It is located between Chichen Itza and Ek' Balam and even with the significant power these sites acquired, it has been identified that the city managed to maintain its political autonomy. It was first documented by the archaeologist Sylvanus Morley in 1919 after the discovery of two large monuments with hieroglyphic inscriptions, in both, two rulers are depicted as Mesoamerican ballgame players.

== History ==
Ichmul de Morley was a Maya city in eastern Yucatán, developed during the Late Classic and Early Postclassic periods of the Mayan civilization and had its own ruling dynasty. Its original name, according to its emblem glyph, was Mut'ul. The site is located halfway between Chichen Itza and Ek' Balam, two major powers that were in constant war. Despite its proximity to Chichen Itza, the site shows no signs of having been under its influence. It is known that it resisted as an autonomous center in a region that was culturally and politically dominated by Chichen Itza. The absence of defensive walls around the city also indicates that, unlike other sites near Chichen Itza, it was not under threat of attack from the Itza.

Panel 2 of Ichmul de Morley depicts two rulers finely dressed wearing headdresses and ceremonial attire. The hieroglyphic inscription on the monument refers to a ruler of the city under the royal title of K'uhul Mut'ul Ajaw, "Holy Lord of Mut'ul", and to a ruler of Ek' Balam known as Ukit Jol Ahkul. According to archaeological research, this event occurred around the year 830 AD in the city of Ek' Balam, as no evidence of a ball court has been found in Ichmul de Morley. In the Stele 1 of the Dzilam González archaeological site a military victory of that city against Ichmul de Morley is recorded, the monument shows a local ruler standing over the emblem glyphs of Ichmul of Morley (Mut'ul) and another nearby site referred as the places of origin of two captives depicted below, kneeling with their hands tied and their heads down, symbolizing their defeat.

Near the ruins of Ichmul de Morley, an abandoned old henequen Hacienda was built using stones from the pre-Columbian mounds of the archaeological site.

The archaeological site of Ichmul de Morley was first documented in 1919 by the archaeologist Sylvanus Morley as part of an archaeological expedition in search of Maya scripts in the region, following a report that pointed the presence of large mounds and monuments with hieroglyphic inscriptions at the site. During his expedition, he discovered and documented two large late Classic style limestone monuments, known as Panels 1 and 2. Since then the site became known as Ichmul "de Morley" (Spanish for Ichmul "of Morley") to recognize it as the site explored by that archaeologist and to distinguish it from other sites with similar name. In 2016, the Panel 1 of Ichmul de Morley was recovered by the National Institute of Anthropology and History after being in the private collection of a hotel in Mérida for several years. Currently, the structures of the site remain buried in dense jungle vegetation, the Panel 1 is displayed in the Gran Museo del Mundo Maya of Mérida while the Panel 2 is located in the Maya Museum of Cancún.
