= Uayma =

Town in the Mexican state of Yucatán

Coordinates: 20°44′N 88°19′W

Uayma's Convent Church

Uayma is a town in the Mexican state of Yucatán. It serves as the municipal seat of the surrounding municipality of Uayma.

== Municipal seat ==
Uayma is a town of 2300 inhabitants located in the center of the Yucatán Peninsula, about 15 kilometers north and west of Valladolid. In colonial times Uayma was a major stop on the El Camino Real between Mérida and Valladolid (Yucatán's third city).

The church was built originally by the Spaniards to enforce their culture in Uayma, which was at the time an important Mayan center. Stones from nearby Mayan temples (including Chichen Itza) were used to build the church, some of which can be seen on the facade. In the 19th century, the church was practically destroyed in the Caste War of Yucatán when the Cruzob Mayas tried to eradicate all evidence of Spanish rule in the Yucatán Peninsula. Other colonial structures and more recently built structures, including a railway station, remain in various states of disrepair around the town.

Renovation of the town's unique church was completed in 2005. Restoration was completed due to the efforts of Elba Villareal de Garcia Ponce and Fernando Garces Fierros, through both a private program called Adopte una Obra de Arte (Adopt a Work of Art) and the government's Institute of Anthropology and History (INAH).
