= Quintana Roo Municipality =

Municipality in the Mexican state of Yucatán

Quintana Roo
- Municipality
- Region 6 Oriente #060

- Location of the Municipality in Mexico
- Coordinates: 20°52′07″N 89°37′53″W
- Country: Mexico
- State: Yucatán

Government
  - Type: 2012–2015
  - Municipal President: Alba Deaneli Aguilar May

Area
  - Total: 139.24 km^{2} (53.76 sq mi)
- Elevation: 26 m (85 ft)

Population (2010)
  - Total: 942
- Time zone: UTC-6 (Central Standard Time)
- INEGI Code: 009
- Major Airport: Merida (Manuel Crescencio Rejón) International Airport
- IATA Code: MID
- ICAO Code: MMMD
- Website: Official Website

Quintana Roo Municipality (Named after a patriot, Andrés Quintana Roo, from Mérida, Yucatán, who supported Mexican independence.) is a municipality in the Mexican state of Yucatán containing 139.24 km^{2} of land and located roughly 104 km east of the city of Mérida.

== History ==
In pre-Hispanic times this area belonged to the chieftainship of Cupules. After the conquest the area became part of the encomienda system.

Yucatán declared its independence from the Spanish Crown in 1821. In 1871 the ranch Hobchén which had been part of the Dzitás Municipality became a pueblo with the name of Quintana Roo. In 1931, it was designated as its own municipality.

== Governance ==
The municipal president is elected for a three-year term. The town council has four aldermen, who serve as Secretary of the Town Hall; and councilors of public works, public security and potable water.

The Municipal Council administers the business of the municipality. It is responsible for budgeting and expenditures and producing all required reports for all branches of the municipal administration. Annually it determines educational standards for schools.

The Police Commissioners ensure public order and safety. They are tasked with enforcing regulations, distributing materials and administering rulings of general compliance issued by the council.

== Communities ==
The head of the municipality is Quintana Roo, Yucatán. The other populated areas in the municipality are Carrillo, Dzulotok Pueblo, Maxcapixcil, San Andrés, San Antonio, Santa Inés, San Juan, and Santa María. The significant populations are shown below:

| Community | Population |
|---|---|
| Entire Municipality (2010) | 942 |
| Quintana Roo | 965 in 2005 |

== Local festivals ==
Every year from 23 to 27 February is a fiesta of the pueblo; from 8 to 12 June the feast in honor of St. Barnabas is celebrated; and the last of August, a celebration for San Bartolomé is held.

== Tourist attractions ==
- Church of San Bartolomé, built in the eighteenth century
- The Chapel of La Mejorada, built in the eighteenth century
- Hacienda Calcehtoc
