= Cenote Zací =

Cenote in Valladolid, Yucatán, Mexico

Coordinates: 20.6916°N 88.1973°W

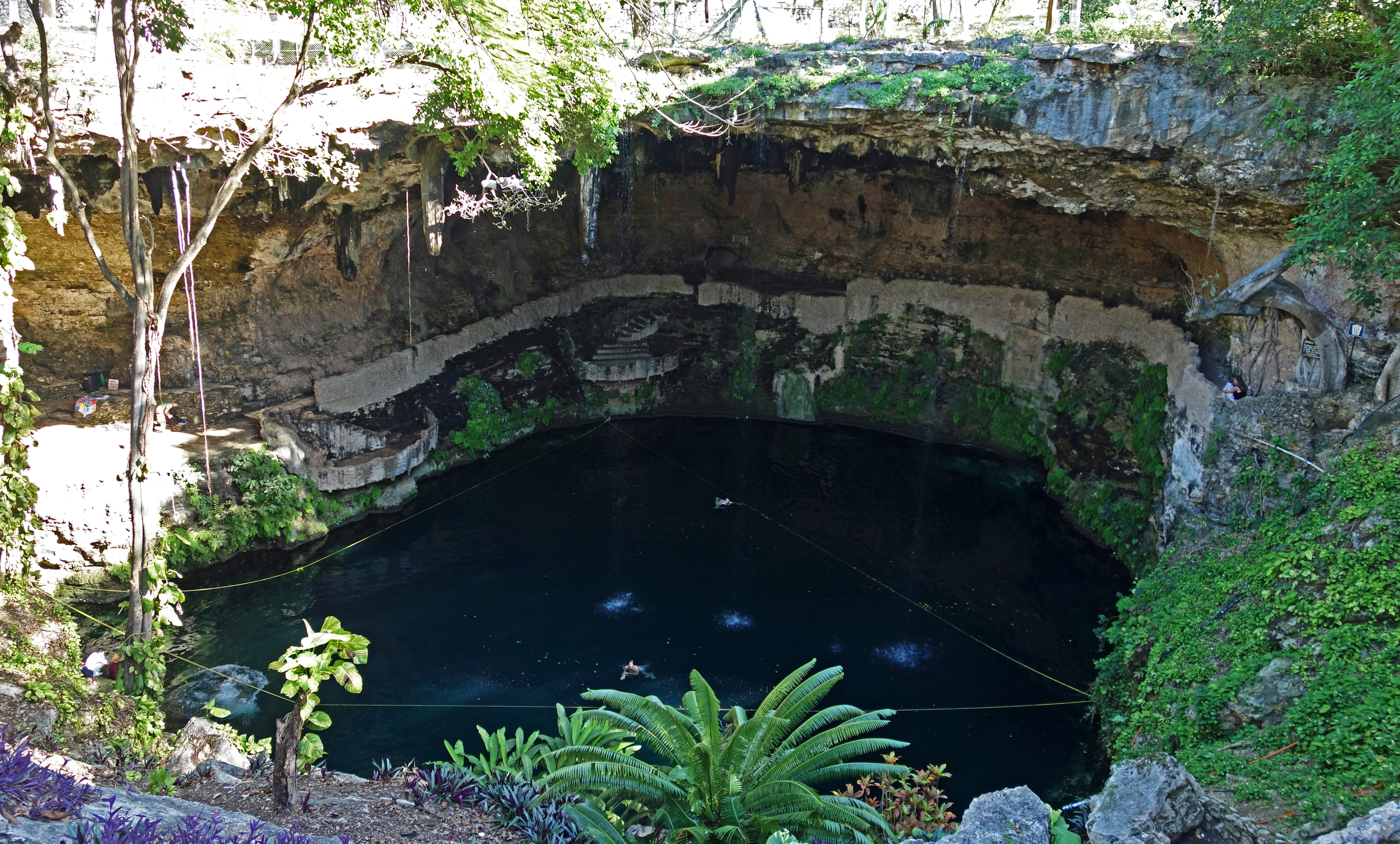
Cenote Zací, January 2017

Cenote Zací (Spanish pronunciation: [seˈnote saˈki]) is a cenote located in the city of Valladolid, Yucatán.

The name Zací (“White Hawk”) comes from the Mayan settlement that was located there. It is where the Capul clan fought against the first conquistadors. Valladolid was later founded in 1543. The cenote was once the city’s water source.

The cenote is in a partially collapsed cavern. The cave is 150 feet across and 260 feet deep. There are some stalactites on the ceiling of the cave. There is a sloped passage with stairs carved from the rock that lead down to the water. It is larger and more open than most other cenotes. The flora around the cenote include poplars, ferns, philodendrons, and orchids. The fauna include swallows, bats, catfish, dragonflies, beetles, and snails. The rocks inside the cave have algae and moss on the outside. The water depth is 25 to 30 meters in the shallow areas and 100 meters in the deepest area. Swimming is allowed. However, it is not encouraged since there are no changing rooms. Furthermore, the proximity to sewer pipes discourages some visitors from swimming. Some jump off a ledge into the water. There is an open-air restaurant at the top of the cenote. Mayan artifacts can be found at a museum.

Its urban location makes it unique amongst other cenotes. It is located only a few blocks northeast from the main plaza. It is on the block formed by Calles 34, 36, 37, and 39.

There is an entrance fee, which was M$ 60 per adult and M$ 30 per child in 2024 (July).
