= The Shanghai Herald =

English newspaper in Shanghai, China

The Shanghai Herald was an English-language newspaper published in Shanghai, China.

The editor of the Shanghai Herald and China Critic, Kwei Chung-shu, had graduated from the University of Wisconsin.

Günther Lenhardt, a journalist from Berlin, Germany, established the Herald. He hired two journalists from Vienna, Austria, Ladislaus Frank and Mark Siegelberg, who had previously worked for the Shanghai Jewish Chronicle. Hartmut Walravens, author of German Influence on the Press in China, said that despite the paper's establishment, "the Shanghai Jewish Chronicle remained the leading paper". The Shanghai Herald and the Shanghai Journal formed an affiliation on March 1, 1946. The Herald began publishing a German supplement, called The Shanghai Herald / German Language Supplement.

== Content ==
One regular feature of the Herald was "Der Wochenslat" ("the weekly salad") by Kurt Lewin.
