= Margaret Park Redfield =

American anthropologist

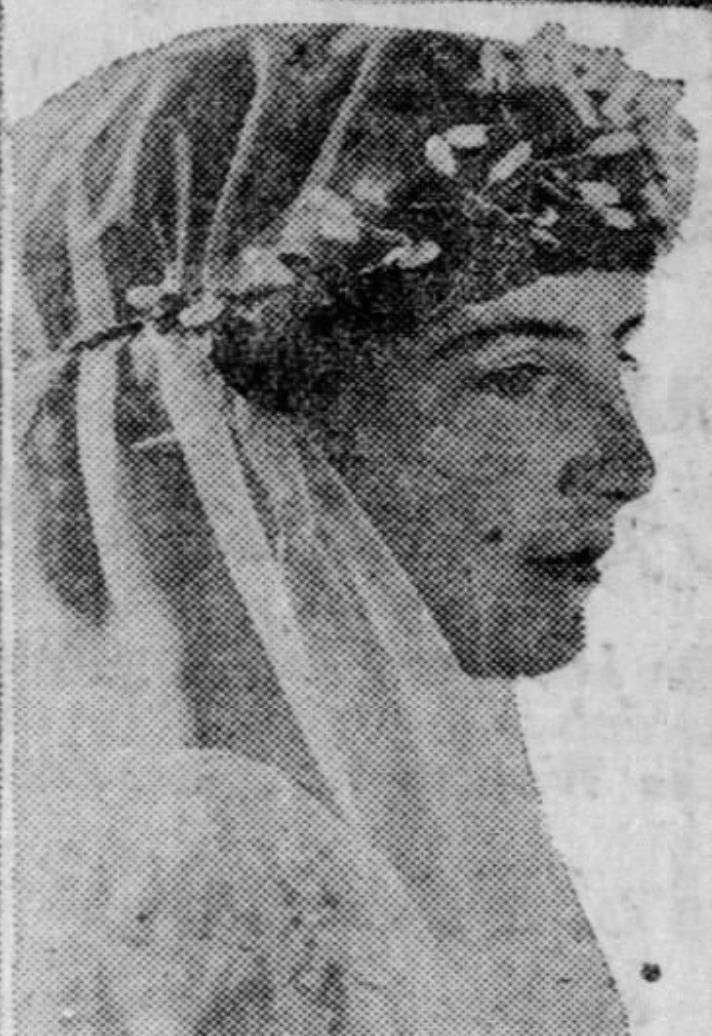
- Margaret Park Redfield, from a 1920 newspaper
- Born: Margaret Lucy Park; December 6, 1898; Lansing, Michigan, United States
- Died: February 6, 1977 (aged 78)
- Occupation: Anthropologist
- Spouse: Robert Redfield
- Children: 4, including Lisa Peattie
- Parent(s): Robert E. Park and Clara Cahill Park

Margaret Lucy Park Redfield (December 6, 1898 – February 6, 1977) was an American anthropologist and editor, who worked in Mexico's Yucatán region, and on projects about rural China.

== Early life and education ==
Margaret Park was born in Lansing, Michigan and raised in Wollaston, Massachusetts, the daughter of Robert E. Park and Clara Cahill Park. Her father was a sociology professor at the University of Chicago and Fisk University, and assistant to Booker T. Washington at Tuskegee Institute; her mother was an artist, clubwoman, and social worker. She studied at Wellesley College for one year, then completed her undergraduate education at the University of Chicago, completing a bachelor's degree in anthropology in 1920.

== Career ==
Redfield collaborated with her husband Robert Redfield in his work in Mexico and Guatemala, and did some ethnographic projects independently. She assisted him and other anthropologists, most notably Fei Xiaotong, in publishing their work. She also wrote reviews for American Journal of Sociology. After her husband's death, she compiled two collections of his scholarship.

== Publications ==
- "Notes on the Cookery of Tepoztlan, Morelos" (1929)
- "The folk literature of a Yucatecan town" (1935)
- "Disease and Its Treatment in Dzitas, Yucatan" (1940, with Robert Redfield)
- Fei Xiaotong, Earthbound China: A Study of Rural Economy in Yunnan (1945, edited by Margaret Park Redfield)
- "The American Family: Consensus and Freedom" (1946)
- Fei Xiaotong, China's Gentry: Essays in Rural-Urban Relations (1953, edited by Margaret Park Redfield)
- Papers of Robert Redfield: Human Nature and the Study of Society (1962, compiled by Margaret Park Redfield)
- Papers of Robert Redfield: The Social Uses of Social Science (1963, compiled by Margaret Park Redfield)

== Personal life and legacy ==
Park married fellow anthropologist Robert Redfield in 1920. They had four children, among them Lisa Peattie, Joanna, and James. One son, Robert III or "Tito", died in a tobogganing accident as a boy. Her husband died in 1958, and she died in 1977, in Chicago, at the age of 78. There is a collection of her papers at the University of Chicago Library.
