= Lisa Peattie =

American anthropologist

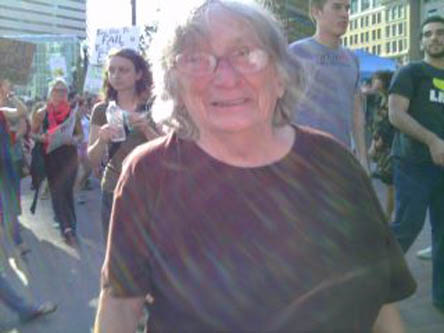
- Peattie at an Occupy Boston march in 2011
- Born: Lisa Redfield; March 1, 1924; Chicago, Illinois, U.S.
- Died: December 13, 2018 (aged 94)
- Education: University of Chicago (Ph.D.)
- Known for: Advocacy planning
- Spouse: Roderick Elia Peattie (m. 1943; died 1963)
- Awards: ACSP Distinguished Educator Award
- Scientific career
- Fields: Urban Anthropology
- Workplaces: Massachusetts Institute of Technology
- Thesis: (1968)

Lisa Redfield Peattie (1924–2018) was an American anthropologist and professor of urban anthropology at the Massachusetts Institute of Technology. She was best known for her work in advocacy planning, a type of urban planning which seeks social change by including all interests and groups in the planning process. Peattie, who earned her Ph.D. from University of Chicago in 1968, published extensively on slums and squatter settlements. She also engaged in numerous peace actions, and had a long, although minor and nonviolent, arrest record.

== Biography ==
Born in Chicago, she was brought up partly in Mexico, in Morelos and Yucatán, where her parents Robert Redfield and Margaret Park Redfield were conducting fieldwork. Her grandfather, Robert E. Park, was an American urban sociologist who worked with Booker T Washington (with whom he shared a fascination with cities and the theory of cities) at the Tuskegee Institute. Together they searched for "The Man Farthest Down". He later taught at the University of Chicago on the theory of urban ecology. Her father was an anthropologist, also at the University of Chicago, had an interest in tracing connections – between archaeology, anthropological linguistics, physical anthropology, cultural anthropology, and ethnology in a synthesis of disciplines and between village cultures in his fieldwork.

She began her anthropological life in 1948 with the Fox Project, which began as a summer of fieldwork for six Chicago graduate students, at Meskwaki Settlement in Iowa, and which, with the encouragement of Sol Tax, became a decade-long effort to redefine anthropology not as pure science, but as part of the human and moral landscape, in what he called "action anthropology", and which was later to reappear in her urban planning work as "advocacy planning".

In 1943 she married Roderick Elia Peattie, the nephew of her aunt's husband. She published two children's books with him: The Law and The City, which began her lifelong study of cities.

Lisa and Roderick went on to have four children.

In 1962 Lisa and Roderick Peattie were hired by the Harvard–MIT Joint Center for Urban Studies, under a contract with the Venezuelan government, as project anthropologist and architect respectively, to help plan the city of Guayana, near the junction of the Orinoco and the Caroni rivers in the interior of Venezuela. They were the only members of the team to live on the site; the rest of the design team worked on the project from the capitol, Caracas, 660 km away. She observed directly the effects of the then-new profession of Urban Planning as it was experienced by the planned-upon population; she reported this radicalizing experience in her first popular book: The View from the Barrio.

Peattie at her home in Venezuela with her family.

Roderick Peattie died in Venezuela, in a car accident in December, 1962. About a year after her husband's death, Lisa Peattie returned to the United States by car with her children and settled in Newton, Massachusetts. Peattie joined the faculty of MIT, where she taught Urban Anthropology until her retirement. She was one of the first women to win tenure at MIT.

In 1966 she, with other faculty and students of M.I.T. and Harvard, organized Urban Planning Aid. This organization was to offer assistance to local residents against highway construction, and housing problems. It took an active part in the urban renewal fights and the Freeway and expressway revolts of the 1960s and 1970s. In the course of these anti-development struggles, she began a study and critique of conventional economic theory, which was strongly pro-development.

She inspired activists in such widely varied subjects as poverty and conviviality. She also was involved in the Homeless Empowerment Project, and in the creation of "Spare Change News", a street newspaper whose mission is "to present, by our own example, that homeless and economically disadvantaged people, with the proper resources, empowerment, opportunity, and encouragement are capable of creating change for ourselves in society." She also became involved in the fight against nuclear arms.

== Awards ==
- ACSP Distinguished Educator Award (1999)

== Books and articles ==
- The View From The Barrio. University of Michigan. 1968. ISBN 9780472722808.
- The informal sector: A few facts from Bogota, some comments and a list of issues. 1974. OCLC 30427428.
- Living poor: A view from the bottom. Urban poverty, a comparison of the Latin American and the United States experience, v. 4. Los Angeles : School of Architecture and Urban Planning, University of California. 1975. OCLC 3785333.
- Thinking about Development. Springer. 1982. ISBN 978-0306407611.
- "Women's Claims: A Study in Political Economy (The Library of Political Economy)", with Martin Rein, Oxford University Press, 1983 ISBN 0-19-877180-0 ISBN 978-0198771807
- Planning: Rethinking Ciudad Guayana. University of Michigan Press. 1987. ISBN 978-0472080694.
- New politics, the state, and planning. UCLA, Graduate School of Architecture and Urban Planning. 1987. OCLC 22261853.
- Planners and protesters: Airport opposition as social movement. Institute for Urban Studies monograph series, no. 9. University of Maryland at College Park, Institute for Urban Studies. 1991. ISBN 9780913749197.
