= Church of Saint Servatius (Valladolid) =

- Iglesia de San Servacio
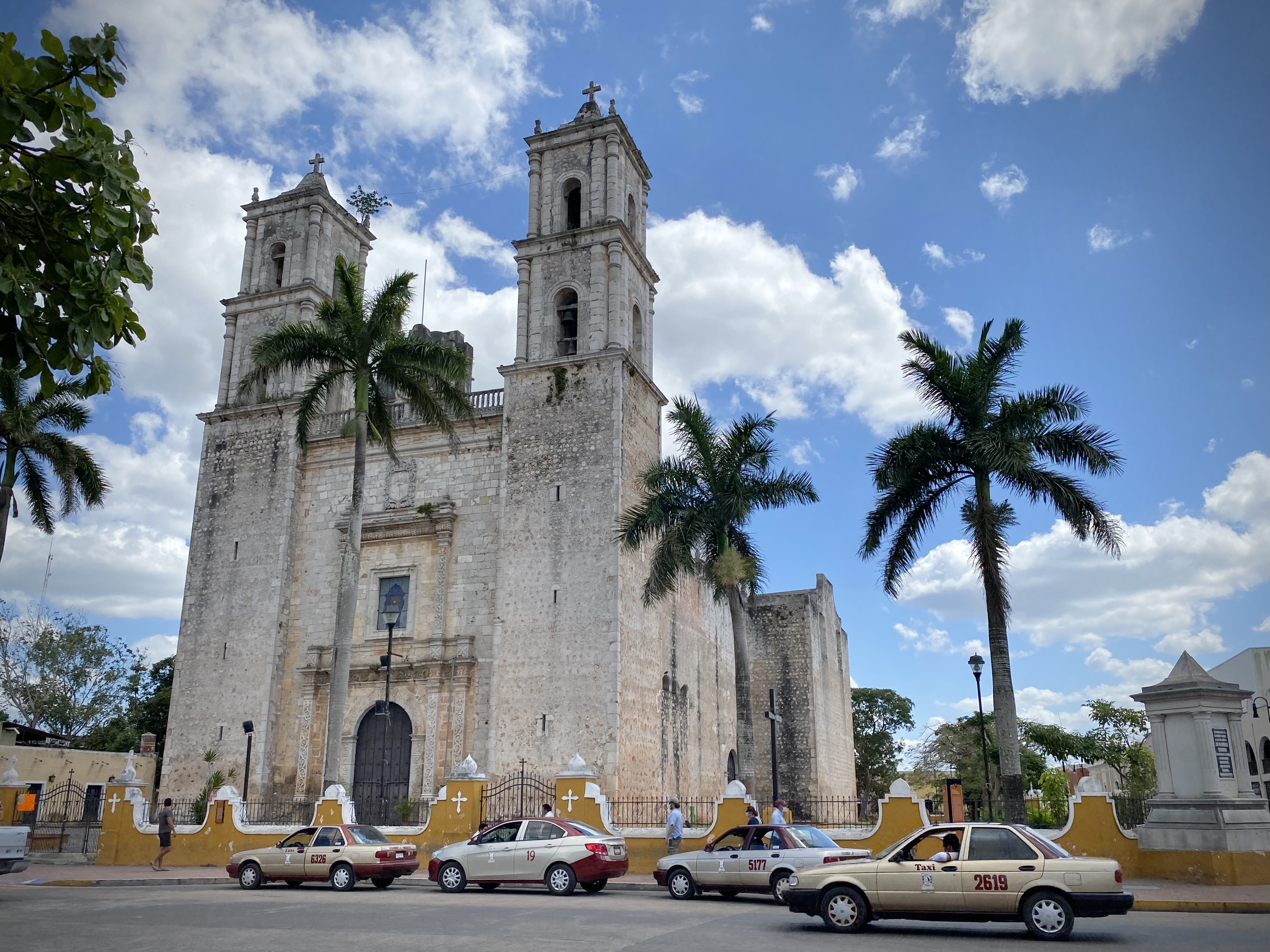
- The church in 2021
- Church of Saint Servatius
- 20.6896°N 88.2019°W
- Location: Valladolid, Yucatán, Mexico
- Address: Calle 41-A, Centro, Valladolid
- Denomination: Roman Catholic

History
- Founded: March 24, 1545 (original)
- Dedication: Servatius of Tongeren

Architecture
- Style: Barrel vault; Spanish Colonial; Churrigueresque (interior)
- Completed: 1706

Administration
- Diocese: Diocese of Yucatán

The Church of Saint Servatius (Note: often misidentified as Saint Gervais or San Gervasio) (Spanish: Iglesia de San Servacio) is a Roman Catholic parish church located on the south side of Parque Francisco Cantón, the main plaza of Valladolid, Yucatán, Mexico. The church is one of the oldest surviving religious structures in the Yucatán Peninsula.

The current structure was built in 1706, with a northward orientation. It replaced the original church, which was demolished following a violent incident known locally as "the crime of the mayors". Its distinctive north-facing orientation, which is unique among colonial churches in Yucatán, is thought to be either a pragmatic alignment with the plaza or a deliberate ecclesiastical punishment for the city's repeated rebellions against Spanish authority.

The church is dedicated to Saint Servatius, a fourth-century Bishop of Tongeren. The building serves as the main parish church of Valladolid and houses the venerated image of the Virgin of Candelaria, patron saint of the city.

== History ==
=== Original church (1545) ===
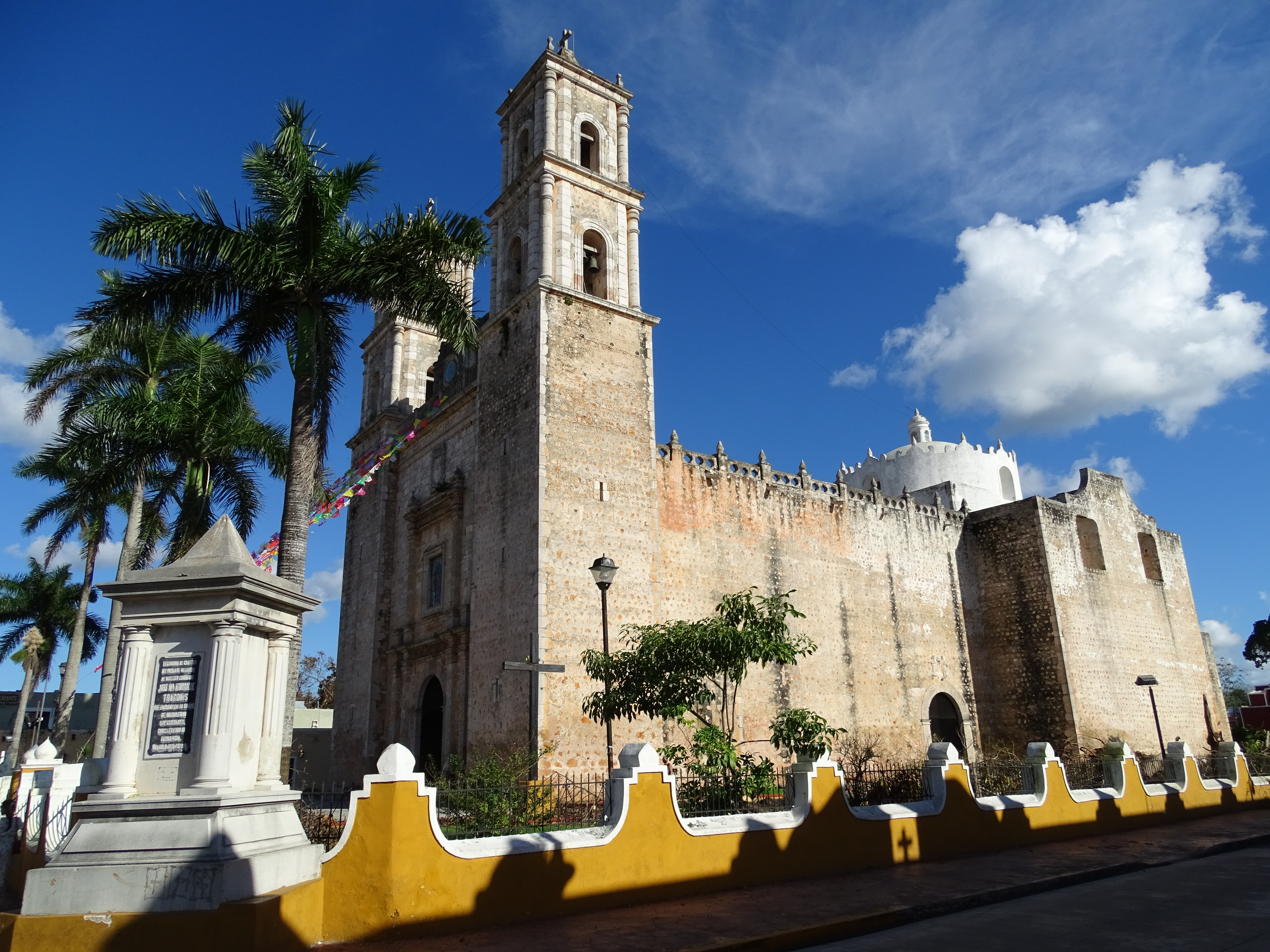
The west side of the church

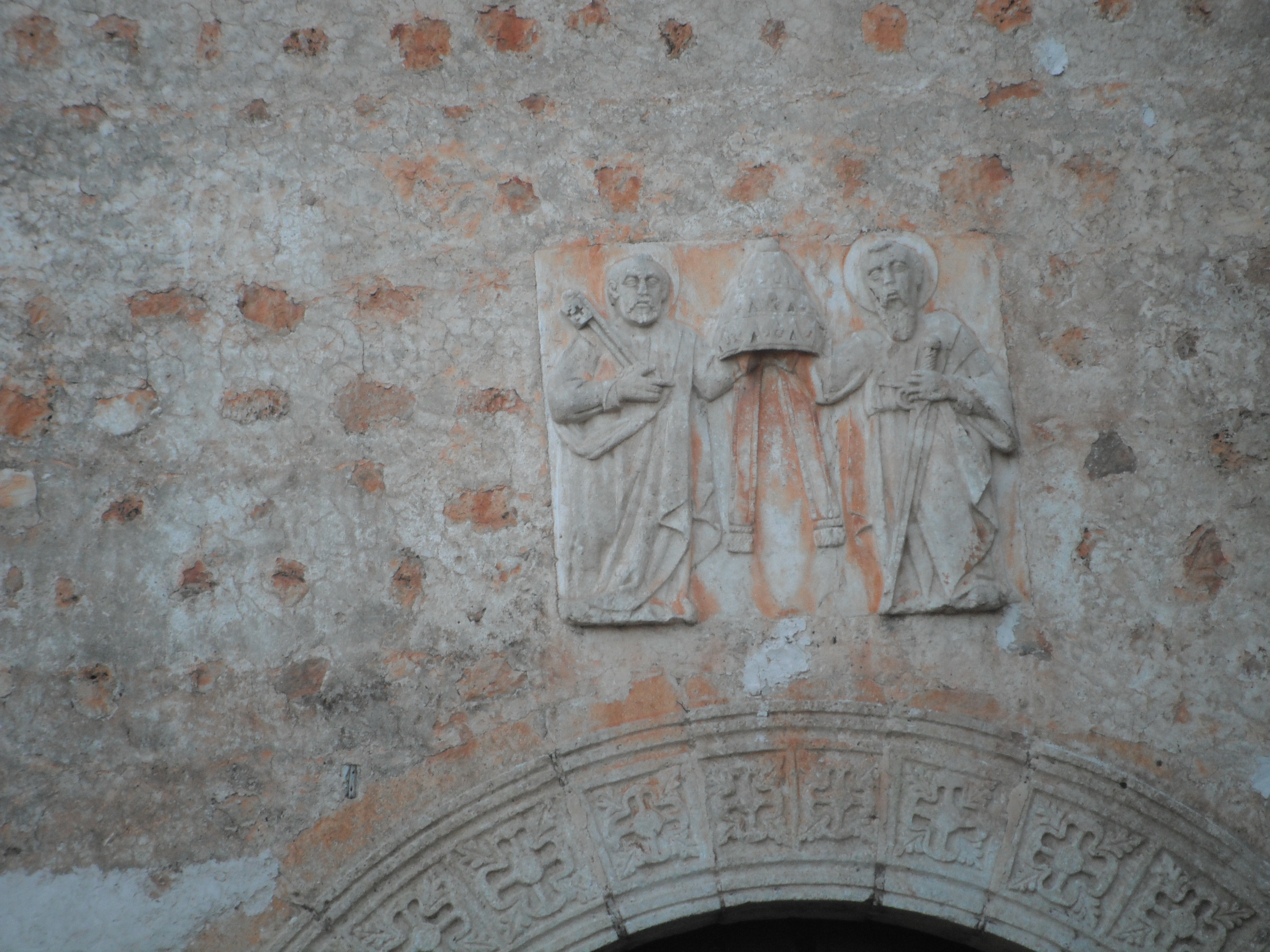
Figures of Saint Peter and Saint Paul can be seen on top of the west entrance

Shortly after the relocation of Valladolid to the current location, construction of a church began. Figures of Saint Peter and Saint Paul were sculpted at the building's entrance.

=== The "crime of the mayors" and rebuilding (1703–1706) ===
The killings were later known as "the crime of the mayors" (el crimen de los alcaldes).

As part of the rebuilding, the altar was repositioned and the main entrance relocated so that it would face north toward the main plaza, now Parque Francisco Cantón, reversing the westward orientation standard for Yucatecan colonial churches.

The historical marker on the church's exterior explains that the reorientation resulted from the 1706 rebuilding, so that the main access would face the main plaza. Although it has also been interpreted as a form of ecclesiastical or political punishment for the city's repeated rebellions against Spanish colonial authority.

== Architecture ==
=== Exterior ===
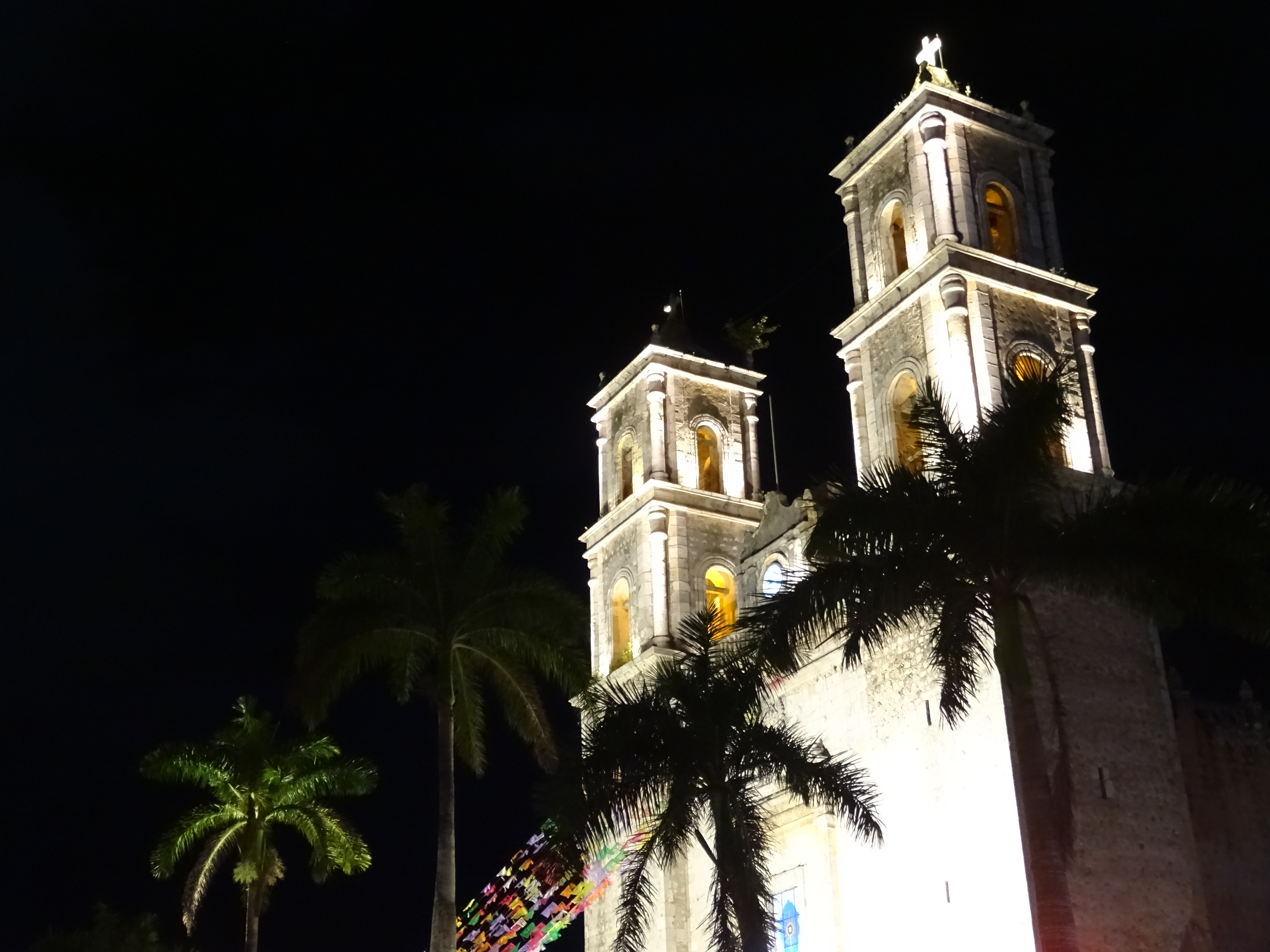
The church's bell towers

The Church of Saint Servatius has a Spanish Colonial style. The building has a barrel vault structure. Its exterior features a series of vertical portholes designed to allow the church's occupants to fire upon attackers during Indigenous rebellions.

The church has two square bell towers, each with one stone-carved cross. Above the facade, there is a 19th-century clock.

=== Interior ===
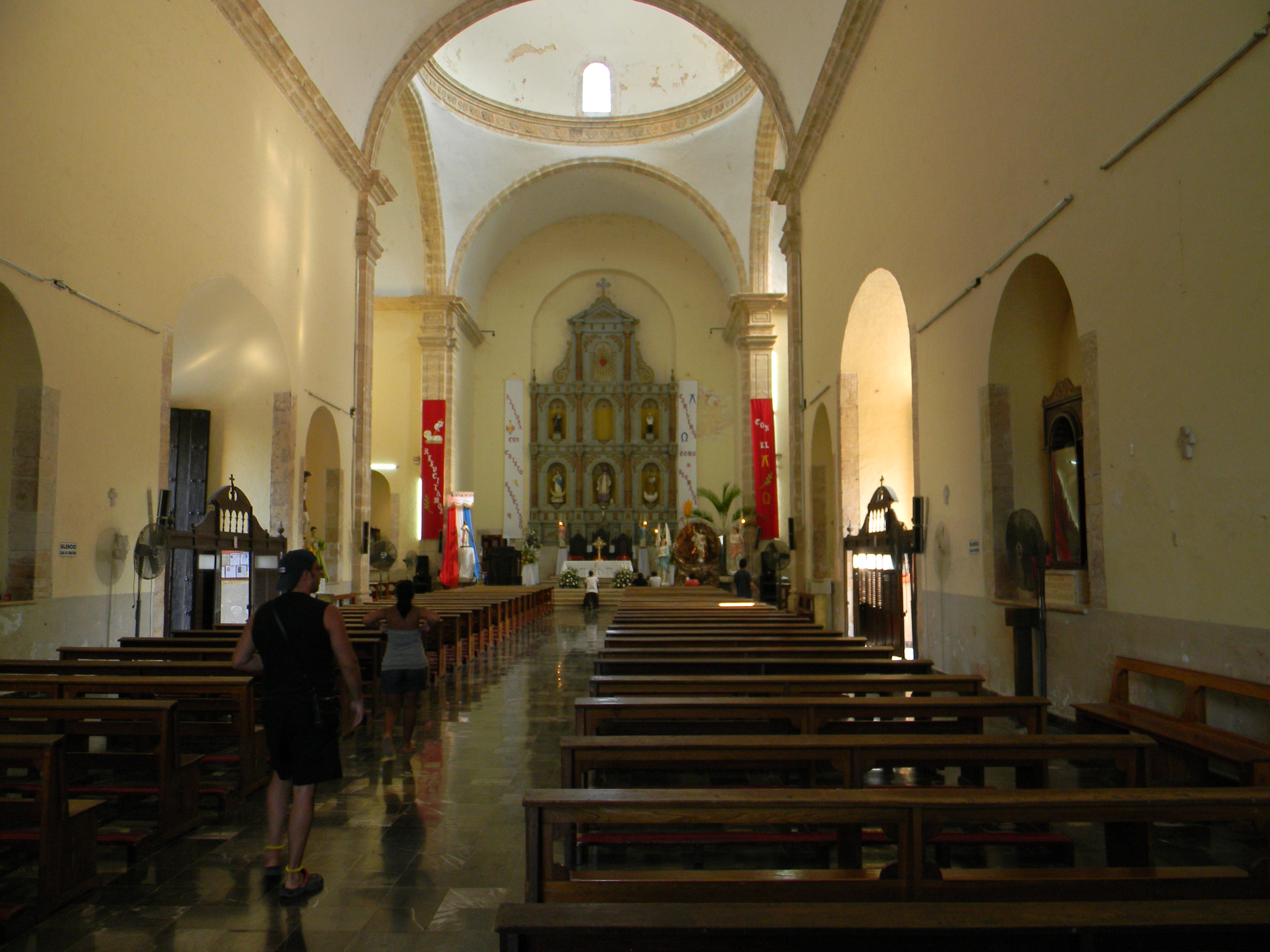
The church's interior

The building has an altarpiece accompanied by four minor altarpieces, each featuring carved sculptures set within niches. The altar has a Churrigueresque style.

The Church of Saint Servatius houses the venerated image of the Virgin of Candelaria, patron saint of the city. Several crypts are also located within the church, estimated to date from the late 19th or early 20th century.
