= Robert Redfield =

American anthropologist (1897–1958)

- Born: December 4, 1897; Chicago, Illinois, U.S.
- Died: October 16, 1958 (aged 60); Chicago, Illinois
- Education: University of Chicago (JD, PhD)
- Spouse: Margaret Park Redfield
- Children: 4, including Lisa and James
- Scientific career
- Fields: Anthropology; Ethnolinguistics; Communication Studies
- Workplaces: University of Chicago

Robert Redfield (December 4, 1897 – October 16, 1958) was an American anthropologist and ethnolinguist, whose ethnographic work in Tepoztlán, Mexico, is considered a landmark of Latin American ethnography. He was associated with the University of Chicago for his entire career: all of his higher education took place there, and he joined the faculty in 1927 and remained there until his death in 1958, serving as Dean of Social Sciences from 1934 to 1946. Redfield was a co-founder of the University of Chicago Committee on Social Thought alongside other prominent Chicago professors Robert Maynard Hutchins, Frank Knight, and John UIrich Nef.

== Career ==
In 1923 he and his wife Margaret Park Redfield traveled to Mexico, where he met Manuel Gamio, a Mexican anthropologist who had studied with Franz Boas. Redfield graduated from the University of Chicago with a degree in Communication Studies, eventually with a J.D. from its law school and then a Ph.D. in cultural anthropology, which he began to teach in 1927.

He was elected to the American Philosophical Society in 1947 and the American Academy of Arts and Sciences in 1950. After a series of published field studies from Mexican communities (Tepoztlán in Morelos and Chan Kom in Yucatán), in 1953 he published The Primitive World and its Transformation and in 1956, Peasant Society and Culture. Moving further into a broader synthesis of disciplines, Redfield embraced a forum for interdisciplinary thought that included archeology, anthropological linguistics, physical anthropology, cultural anthropology, and ethnology.

Redfield wrote in 1955 about his own experience doing research in Latin America on peasants. As he did research, he realized he had been trained to treat the society as an isolated culture. However, he found people were involved with trade and there were connections between villages and states. More than that, the village culture was not bounded. Beliefs and practices were not isolated. Redfield decided it did not make sense to study people as isolated units, but rather it would be better to understand people in a broader perspective. Traditionally, anthropologists studied folkways in the "little tradition", taking into account broader civilization, the "great tradition". He was elected a Fellow of the American Academy of Arts and Sciences in 1950.

One of Redfield's students at the University of Chicago was well-known novelist Kurt Vonnegut. Vonnegut was influenced by Redfield's work on the "folk society" and references him in his novel Slapstick, as well as throughout his non-fiction speeches and commencement addresses. Vonnegut recalls:

when I went to the University of Chicago, and I heard the head of the Department of Anthropology, Robert Redfield, lecture on the folk society, which was essentially a stable, isolated extended family, he did not have to tell me how nice that could be.

Vonnegut would later remark that "Dr. Redfield's theory of the Folk Society ... has been the starting point for my politics, such as they are."

=== University of Chicago Anthropology ===
Redfield intermittently served as Chair of the Department of Anthropology along with Sol Tax after the retirement of Fay-Cooper Cole in the late 1940s. Cole had built up the Archaeology Laboratory Skeletal Collection, which began during the earliest iterations of the department in the late 1890s through the 1940s. The collection of human remains of both Indigenous and non-Indigenous people, bone fragments, and artifacts were compiled, studied, stored, and possibly exhibited on the campus. The skeletal collection contained human remains and archaeological objects taken and collected by faculty, students, curators, and donors through excavations of Illinois burial mounds such as the Fisher Mounds, Starved Rock, Kincaid, Algeria, Globe, Arizona, among materials from private donors. The collection also contained human remains from the University's Anatomy Department and Medical School. Donations accounted for a significant portion of the collection. Skeletal remains of 400 Indigenous people, as well as 10,000 bone fragments, stone, pottery and shell implements and artifacts largely excavated from Fisher and Adler Mounds, were donated in 1930 by George Langford, an engineer from Joliet who as also an amateur anthropologist, an honorary Research Associate in the Department of Anthropology at the University of Chicago, and later Curator of Plant Fossils at Field Museum.

The politics of the department had changed with the faculty body, and Redfield and Tax determined that the Skeletal Collection no longer served the research purposes of the department, and the storage space could be better used. They tasked a graduate student in the department to inventory and report on the collection. Around 1950, much of the skeletal collection was unofficially dispersed to other institutions like Indiana University, Illinois State Museum, Beloit College, and the Field Museum. Under NAGPRA guidelines, these institutions are now responsible for deaccessioning and repatriating Native American human remains and funerary objects. The remaining skeletal materials do not account for extent of the historical collection; the department's report recommended that the majority be "dumped."

The contemporary University of Chicago Archaeology Laboratory continues to hold non-Native American human remains, the paleoanthropology laboratory contains a large osteology collection.

== Scholarly views ==
In addition to his field anthropology work, Redfield made public and published contributions to the philosophy of social science. In a series of lectures, Redfield advocated for a value-laden understanding of the work of the social scientist, as well as a unified approach to the social sciences and the humanities. Against those who advocate for value-free science, for example, Redfield argued that "The values of the social scientist are necessary to his scientific work. Values are a part of the methods of social science. They are the means to learning about other people’s values."

For Redfield, the social scientist does not merely study, but actively forms values. He argues that:

"Social science is one of the ways to form our convictions as to the good life. This it does not as preaching does it, by telling us what the good is and what our duty is. It does not do it as ethics does it, by examining central questions as to the nature of conduct and by criticizing and formulating systematic rules of conduct. It does it by remaining science. It does it by making clear to us where our choices lead us and what means must be employed to reach what ends. It does it by extending our understanding of where our ideals are in conflict with our practices and where our ideals are in conflict with each other. And it does this through those intensive studies of particular societies and particular men which are not ordinarily carried on in ethics and which are outside the powers and responsibilities of the preacher."

Redfield also favored the tendency of the German university system to associate the social sciences and humanities together as Geisteswissenschaften, the spiritual or human sciences. Redfield explored this topic at length in an article entitled Social Science Among the Humanities, originally published in 1951 in Measure: A Critical Journal and later collected in his posthumous papers. While the methods of the social sciences may attempt to mimic the methods of the natural sciences, Redfield argued the social sciences and the humanities share a common object of study that unites them. He explains, "No one is more deeply engaged in the examination and understanding of human nature than are the dramatist and the novelist. In learning about human nature, men of literature and men of social science share a common effort, a common interest."

== Personal life ==
Redfield was the son-in-law of University of Chicago sociologist Robert E. Park. Redfield and his wife Margaret were the parents of Lisa Redfield Peattie, Professor Emerita at the Massachusetts Institute of Technology; James M. Redfield, a professor of classics at the University of Chicago; and Joanna Redfield Gutmann (1930–2009). Another son, Robert (called Tito), died at the age of twelve from injuries sustained in a sledding accident. His brother-in-law was the naturalist Donald C. Peattie, whose nephew married Redfield's daughter Lisa.

Redfield died in October 1958 from complications of lymphatic leukemia.

The papers of Robert and Margaret Redfield are located at the Special Collections Research Center, University of Chicago Library.

== Published works ==
Redfield's published works include:

- Tepoztlan, a Mexican Village: A Study in Folk Life. Chicago: University of Chicago Press (1930).
- Folk Cultures of the Yucatán. Chicago: University of Chicago Press (1948).
- The Primitive World and Its Transformations. Ithaca: Cornell University Press (1953).
- The Role of Cities in Economic Development and Cultural Change. Chicago: University of Chicago Press (1954).
- The Little Community. Chicago: University of Chicago Press (1956).
- Talk with a Stranger. Stamford, Connecticut: Overbrook Press (1958).

== See also ==
- Fei Xiaotong
- Melville J. Herskovits
- Katherine Dunham
