= Valladolid Municipality, Yucatán =

Municipality in the Mexican state of Yucatán

- Municipality
- Coat of arms

- Valladolid municipality in the Yucatán
- Coordinates: 20.62°N 88.13°W
- Country: Mexico
- State: Yucatán
- Municipal seat: Valladolid

Population (2020)
  - Total: 85,460

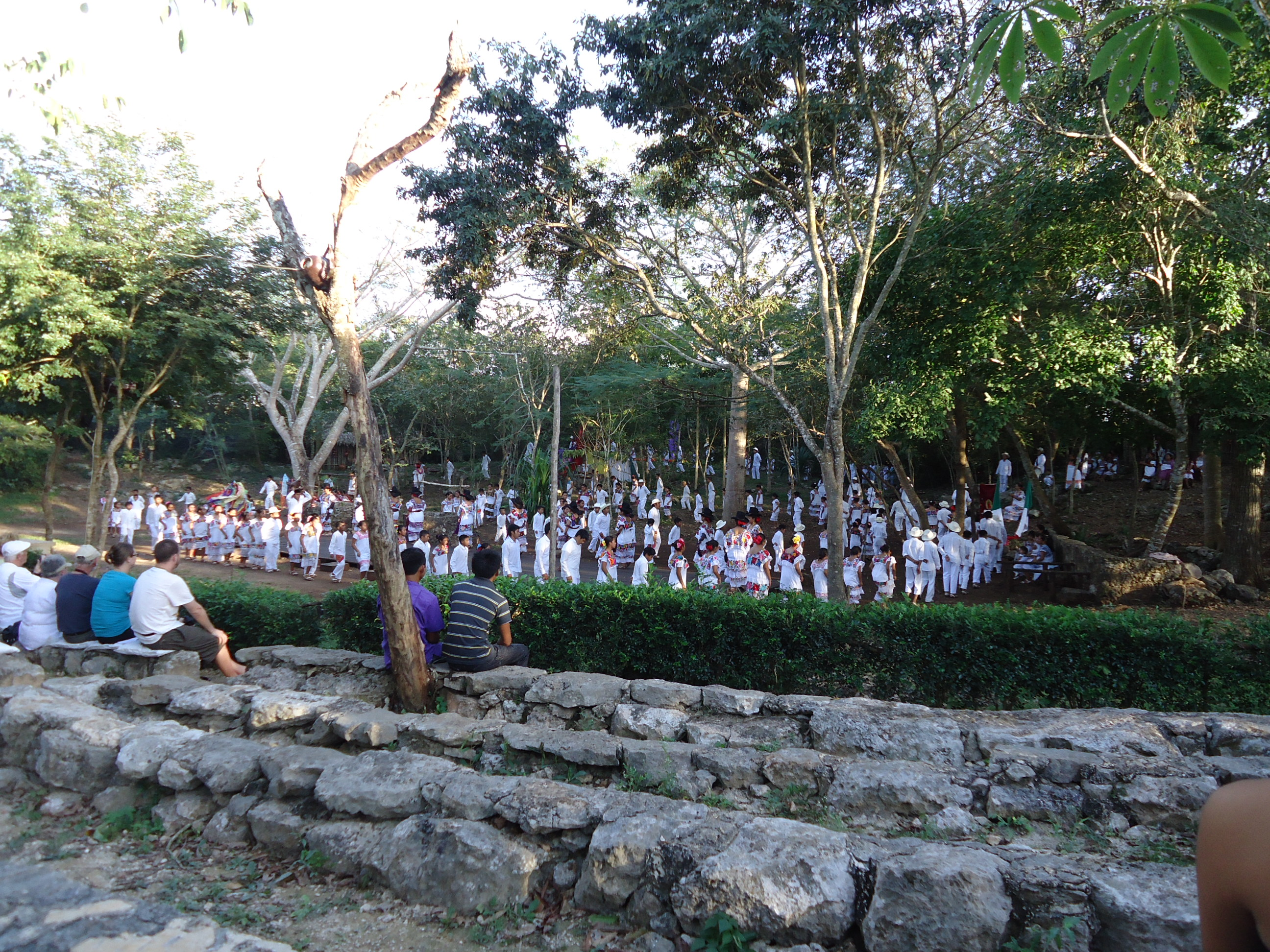
Theater in Xocén

Valladolid Municipality (Saki' in Maya) has its seat in Valladolid, Yucatán in the southeastern part of the Mexican state of Yucatán. Valladolid is in the inland eastern part of the state.
