= Valladolid, Yucatán =

Municipal city seat in Yucatán State, Mexico

Valladolid
- City
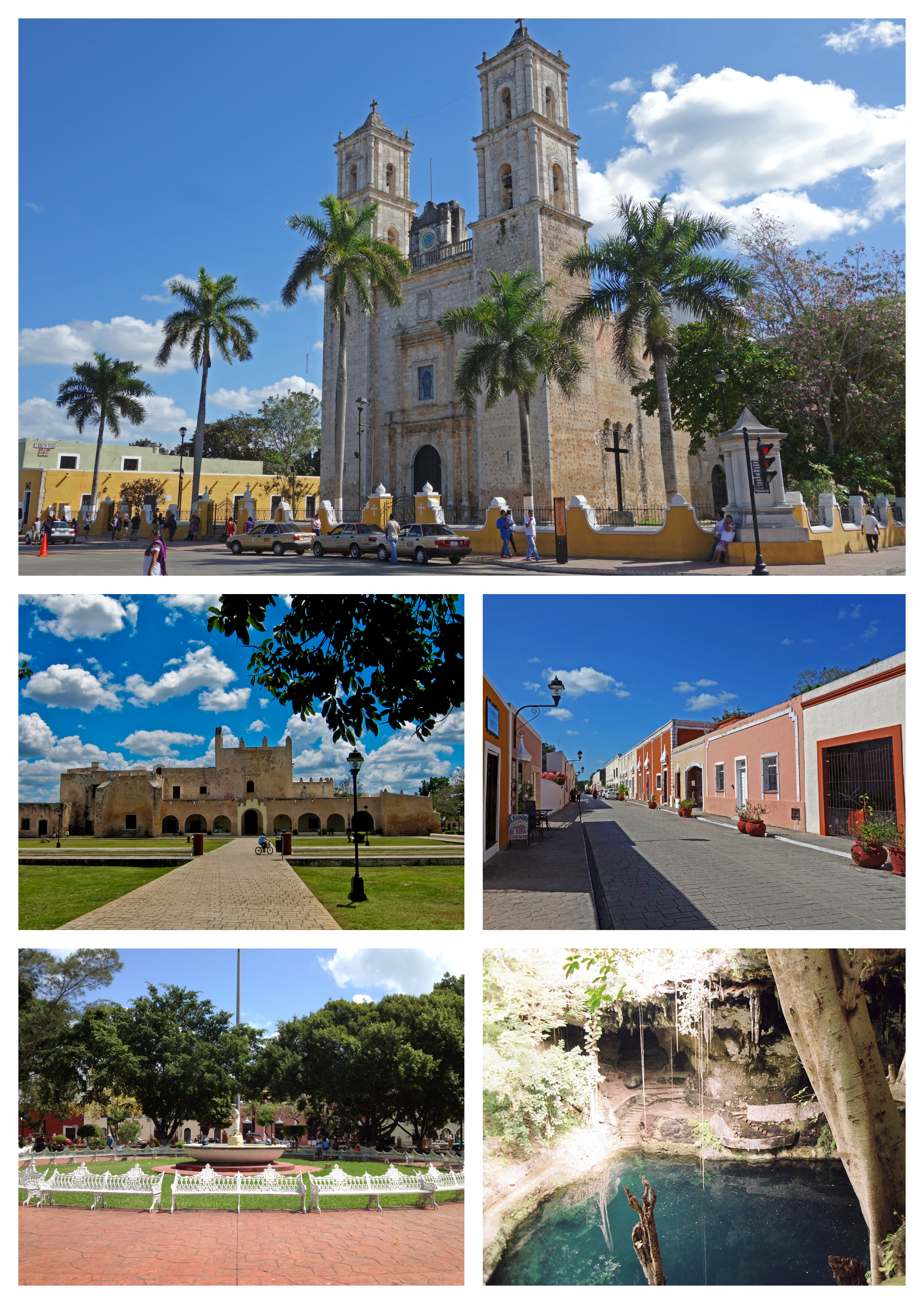
- Clockwise, from top: Church of Saint Servatius, historic center, cenote, Parque Francisco Cantón, Monastery of San Bernardino de Siena

- Coat of arms
- Nickname: La Sultana del Oriente (The Sultaness of the East)
- Motto: Cuatro Veces Heróica (Four Times Heroic)
- Location within Yucatán (state) Location within Mexico
- Coordinates: 20°41′22″N 88°12′06″W
- Country: Mexico
- State: Yucatán
- Municipality: Valladolid
- Founded: May 28, 1543
- Founder: Francisco de Montejo (the Nephew)
- Named for: Valladolid, Spain
- HDI: ▲0.7745 high

Government
  - Municipal president: Enrique Ayora Sosa (2018-2021)

Area
  - Total: 431.4 sq mi (1,117 km^{2})
- Elevation: 30 ft (9.1 m)

Population (2020)
  - Total: 56,494
  - Density: 131.0/sq mi (50.56/km^{2})
- Demonym: Vallisoletano(a)
- Time zone: UTC-6 (Central Standard Time)
- Postal code: 97780
- Calling Code: 985
- Climate: Aw

Valladolid (Spanish: [ba.ʝa.ðo.ˈlið]; Sakiʼ in Maya) is a city located in the eastern region of the Mexican state of Yucatán. It is the seat of Valladolid Municipality. Valladolid is located approximately 170 km (105 mi) east of the state capital Mérida, 40 km (25 mi) east of Chichén Itzá, and 150 km (93 mi) west of Cancún.

Valladolid is part of the Pueblos Mágicos promotional initiative led by the federal Secretariat of Tourism.

== History ==
Named after Valladolid, at the time the capital of Spain, Valladolid in Yucatán was established by Spanish Conquistador Francisco de Montejo's nephew on May 27, 1543, at some distance from the current town, at a lagoon called Chouac-Ha in the municipality of Tizimín. Early Spanish settlers complained about the mosquitos and humidity at the original location, and petitioned to have the city moved further inland. On March 24, 1545, Valladolid was relocated to its current location, built atop a Mayan town called Zací or Zací-Val, whose buildings were dismantled to reuse the stones to build the Spanish colonial town. The following year, the Maya people revolted, but the rebellion was suppressed with the support of additional Spanish troops from Mérida.

In 1705, there was another revolt by local Maya; the rebels killed a number of town officials who had taken refuge in the cathedral. When the revolt was suppressed, the cathedral was considered irreparably profaned, and was demolished. A new cathedral was built the following year that still exists, and was oriented to face north, unlike most other Colonial churches in Yucatán which faced east.

Valladolid had a population of 15,000 in 1840. In January 1847, the native Mayas rioted again, killing some eighty whites and sacking their houses. After a Maya noble was shot by firing squad, the riot became a general uprising. It was led by Jacinto Pat, batab of Tihosuco and by Cecilio Chi of nearby Ichmul. The city and the surrounding region was the scene of intense battle during the Yucatán Caste War, and the Ladino forces were compelled to abandon Valladolid on March 14, 1848, with half being killed by ambush before they had reached Mérida. The city was sacked by Maya rebels but was recaptured later in the war.

Until the beginning of the 20th century, Valladolid was the third-largest and most important city of the Yucatán Peninsula (after Mérida and Campeche). It had a sizable well-to-do Criollo population, with a number of old Spanish-style mansions in the old city. Valladolid was widely known by its nickname, The Sultana of the East.

== Sights ==
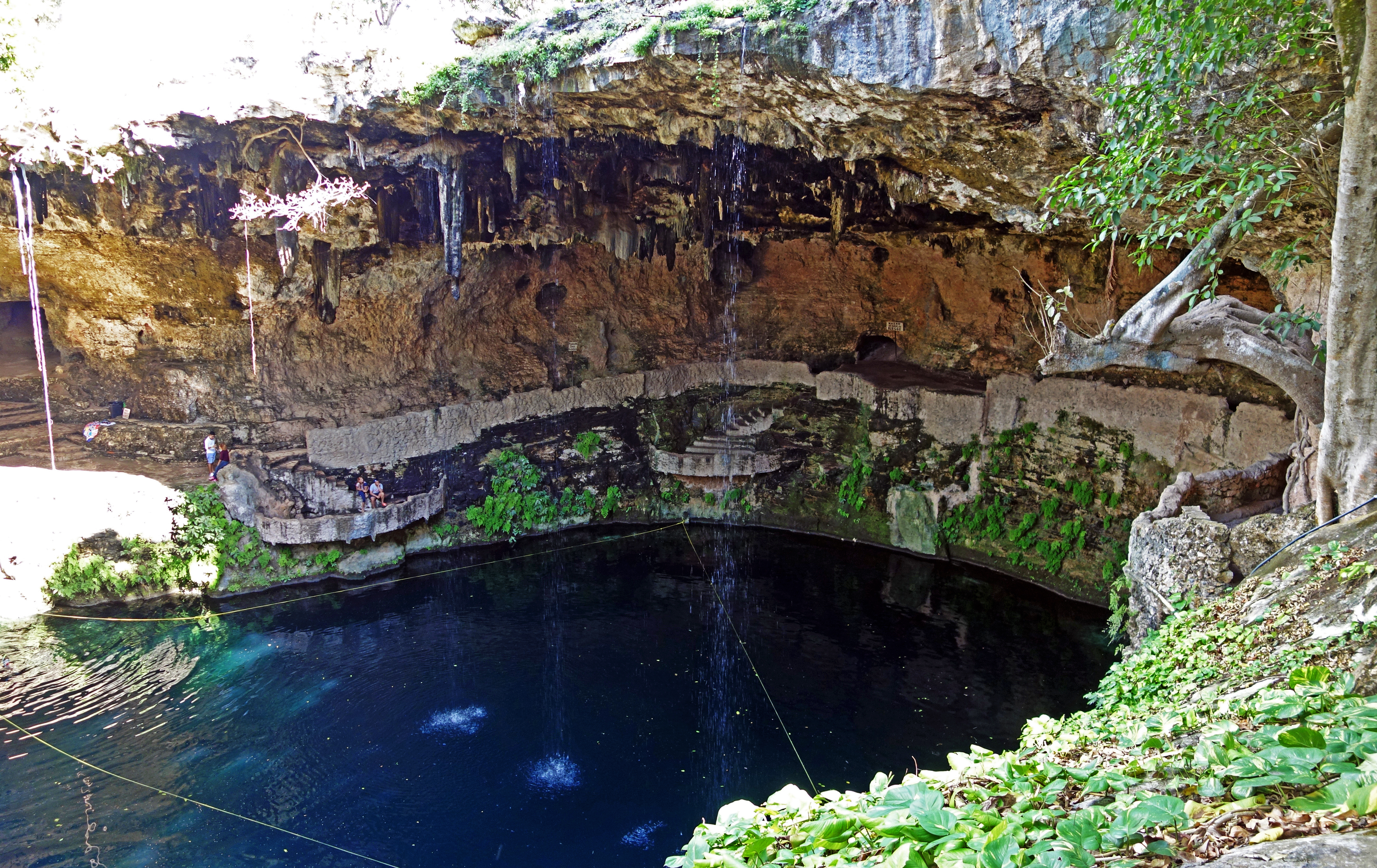
Cenote Zací

Valladolid is a popular city in which to explore the history and culture of the Yucatán Peninsula. Notable sights include the colonial-era ex-convent and church Convent of San Bernardino de Siena (named after saint Bernardino of Siena), which was built by Franciscan missionaries between 1552 and 1560 in the Sisal neighbourhood.

This monastic complex is linked to the historic city center via the Calzada de los Frailes, a preserved 16th-century colonial avenue featuring restored masonry architecture and traditional Yucatecan street layouts.

In downtown Valladolid is the Church of Saint Servatius (named after Saint Servatius), located in the main square of the city. The center of the city's grid-like road structure features a plaza — Parque Principal Francisco Cantón Rosado — surrounded by restaurants and shops and filled with "sillas tú y yo" common to the Yucatán peninsula. Located close to the heart of the city is the Cenote Zací, a landscaped freshwater cenote or underground sinkhole in which visitors can explore and swim. There is also a restaurant on the premises of the Cenote Zací and artisans selling handcrafts. Valladolid is a popular base for visiting nearby major Maya ruins such as Chichén Itzá and Ekʼ Balam, as well as Cenote Ik Kil. Many principal sites are marked with bilingual signage to make them more hospitable for English-speaking tourists.

== Gastronomy ==
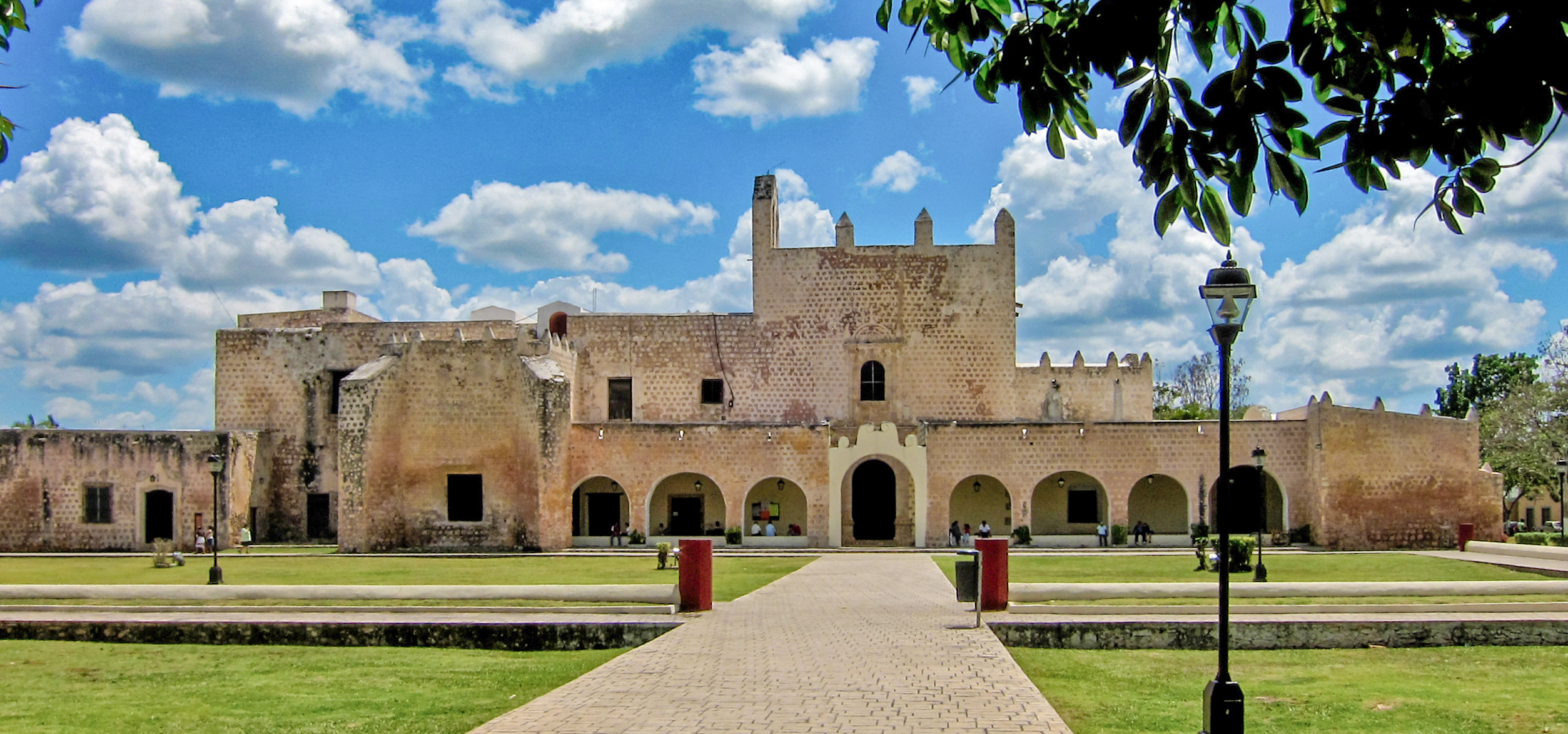
Convent of San Bernardino de Siena

The typical dish of the region is Lomitos de Valladolid which is a pork dish in fresh tomato sauce; Cochinita pibil meat marinated in achiote, and spices, wrapped in banana leaf and barbecued or baked in a pit; lechon al horno, bistek de cazuela, relleno negro which is turkey cooked with a paste of charred chillies and vegetables with bits of hard-boiled eggs, frijol con puerco and chicken in escabeche. Valladolid is also known for its longaniza which are a type of pork-based salami sausage with traditional condiments. Local traditional candies are based on materials from the region such as honey, coconut, corn and others. Traditional ice cream is also very popular. The most common flavours are coconut, corn and fruits of the region as guanabana, mamey sapote and others.

== Climate ==
The climate in the Yucatán Peninsula is hot and dry. There is also tropical rain with hot and predominate trade winds most times of the year. Valladolid features a tropical wet and dry climate. The city lies in the trade wind belt close to the Tropic of Cancer, with the prevailing wind from the east. Valladolid's climate is hot and humidity is moderate to high, depending on the time of year. The average annual high temperature is 33 °C (91 °F), ranging from 28 °C (82 °F) in January to 36 °C (97 °F) in May, but temperatures often rise above 38 °C (100 °F) in the afternoon in this time. Low temperatures range between 18 °C (64 °F) in January to 23 °C (73 °F) in May and June. It is most often a few degrees hotter in Valladolid than coastal areas due to its inland location and low elevation. The rainy season runs from June through October, associated with the Mexican monsoon which draws warm, moist air landward. Easterly waves and tropical storms also affect the area during this season.

Climate data for Valladolid, Yucatán (1981–2000)
Month	Jan	Feb	Mar	Apr	May	Jun	Jul	Aug	Sep	Oct	Nov	Dec	Year
Record high °C (°F)	36.3 (97.3)	36.6 (97.9)	40.5 (104.9)	41.6 (106.9)	42.8 (109.0)	42.0 (107.6)	39.6 (103.3)	39.5 (103.1)	38.5 (101.3)	38.5 (101.3)	37.5 (99.5)	34.6 (94.3)	42.8 (109.0)
Mean daily maximum °C (°F)	29.8 (85.6)	31.3 (88.3)	33.0 (91.4)	35.2 (95.4)	36.2 (97.2)	34.5 (94.1)	34.6 (94.3)	34.6 (94.3)	33.9 (93.0)	32.4 (90.3)	31.1 (88.0)	29.9 (85.8)	33.0 (91.4)
Daily mean °C (°F)	23.5 (74.3)	24.4 (75.9)	25.7 (78.3)	27.9 (82.2)	29.1 (84.4)	28.8 (83.8)	28.4 (83.1)	28.4 (83.1)	28.1 (82.6)	26.8 (80.2)	25.0 (77.0)	23.8 (74.8)	26.6 (79.9)
Mean daily minimum °C (°F)	17.1 (62.8)	17.5 (63.5)	18.5 (65.3)	20.6 (69.1)	22.1 (71.8)	23.1 (73.6)	22.2 (72.0)	22.2 (72.0)	22.2 (72.0)	21.2 (70.2)	18.9 (66.0)	17.6 (63.7)	20.3 (68.5)
Record low °C (°F)	7.6 (45.7)	8.4 (47.1)	8.1 (46.6)	10.7 (51.3)	13.4 (56.1)	19.3 (66.7)	19.4 (66.9)	19.4 (66.9)	19.4 (66.9)	15.2 (59.4)	11.2 (52.2)	9.1 (48.4)	7.6 (45.7)
Average precipitation mm (inches)	39.0 (1.54)	56.8 (2.24)	59.1 (2.33)	33.8 (1.33)	74.6 (2.94)	172.0 (6.77)	141.9 (5.59)	141.5 (5.57)	176.8 (6.96)	145.9 (5.74)	46.4 (1.83)	53.5 (2.11)	1,141.2 (44.93)
Average precipitation days (≥ 0.1 mm)	6.1	4.2	3.0	3.1	7.3	12.9	15.5	17.1	18.4	14.6	5.9	5.8	113.8
Average relative humidity (%)	75	71	69	68	68	75	75	76	78	79	77	76	74
Mean monthly sunshine hours	224	242	272	259	251	229	223	223	203	233	209	210	2,778
Source 1: Servicio Meteorológico National
Source 2: Deutscher Wetterdienst (sun, 1961–1990) (Note: Station ID for Valladolid, YUC. is 76647 Use this station ID to locate the sunshine duration)

== Transportation ==
The Tren Maya stops at Valladolid at the Valladolid railway station.

Valladolid has a grid layout for streets and is connected to surrounding areas by federal highways. Highway 180 and its tolled variant both traverse the city and connect it to Cancún as well as archaeological sites. An Autobuses de Oriente bus terminal situated in the heart of the city also connects Valladolid to other parts of the Yucatán Peninsula.

== Gallery ==
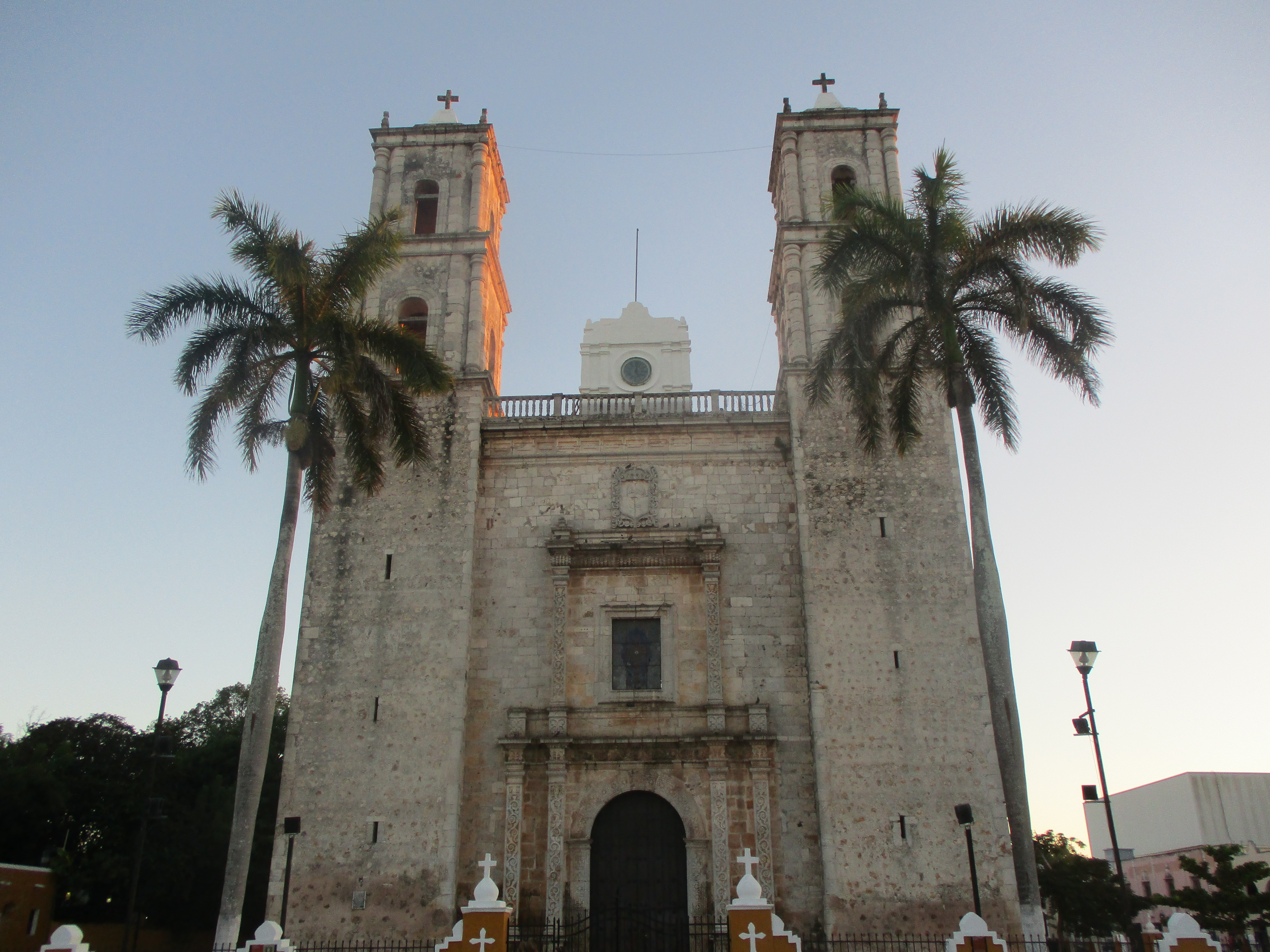
Cathedral

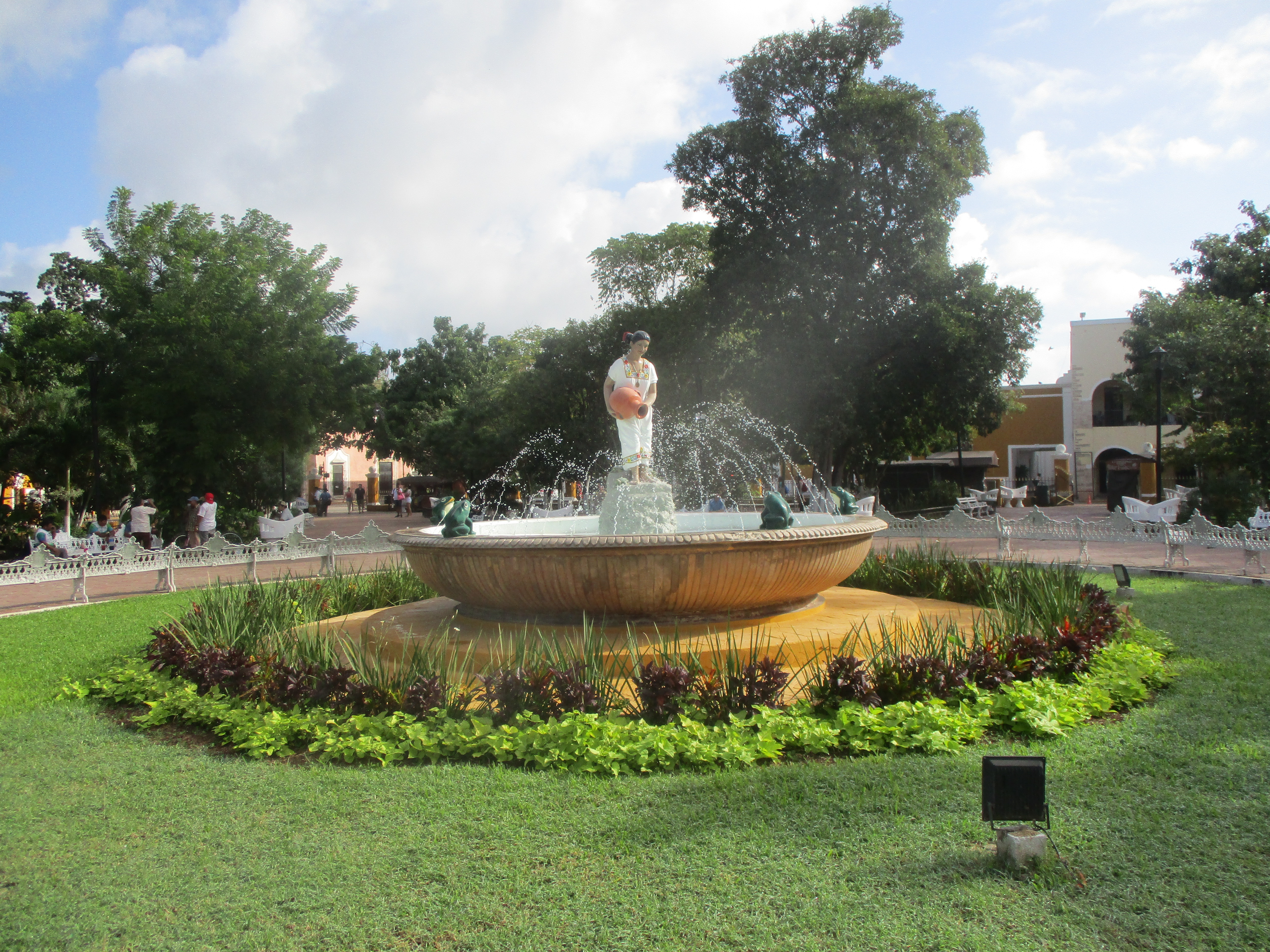
Fountain in Parque Francisco Canton

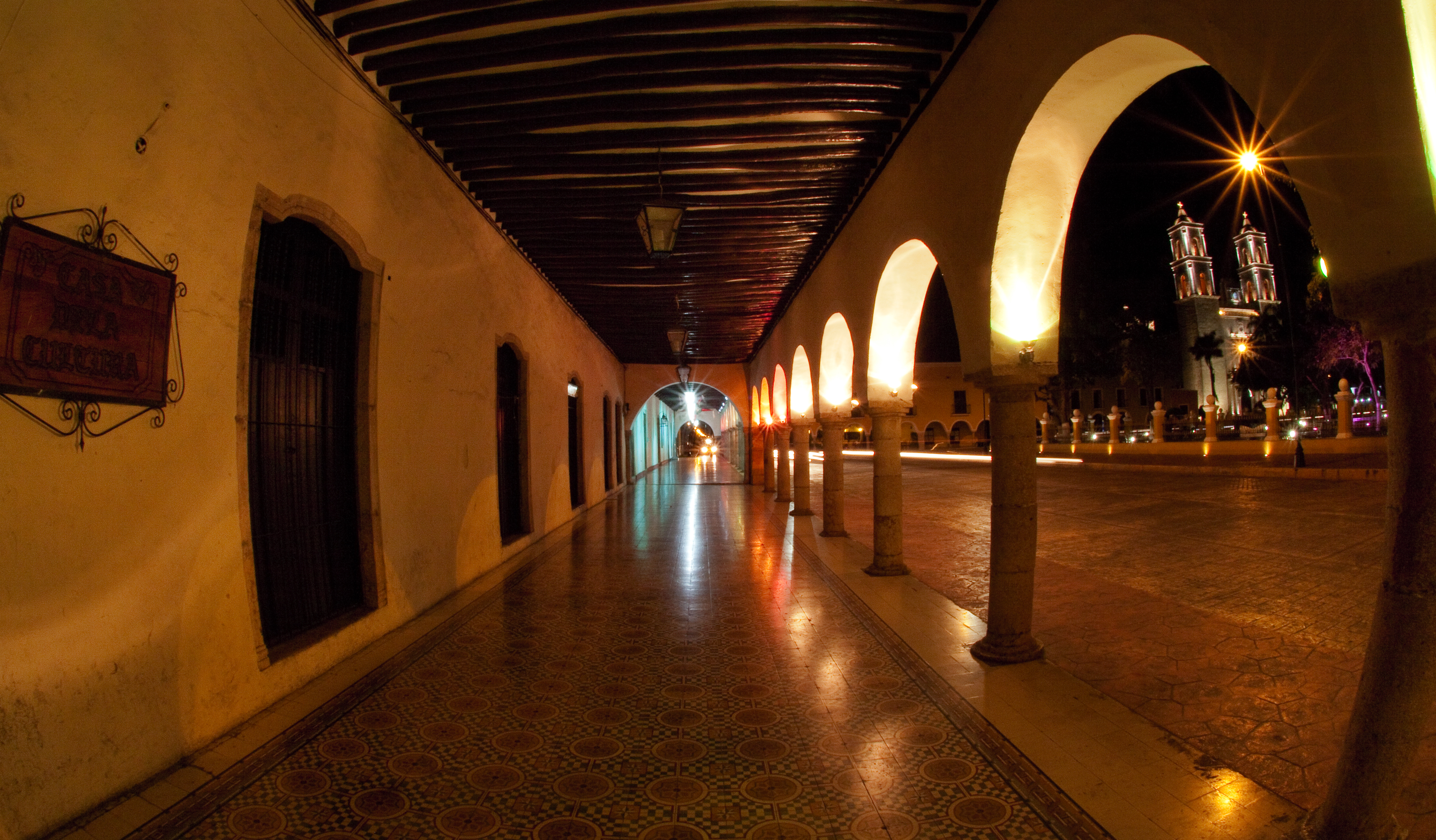
Gallery of Municipal Palace

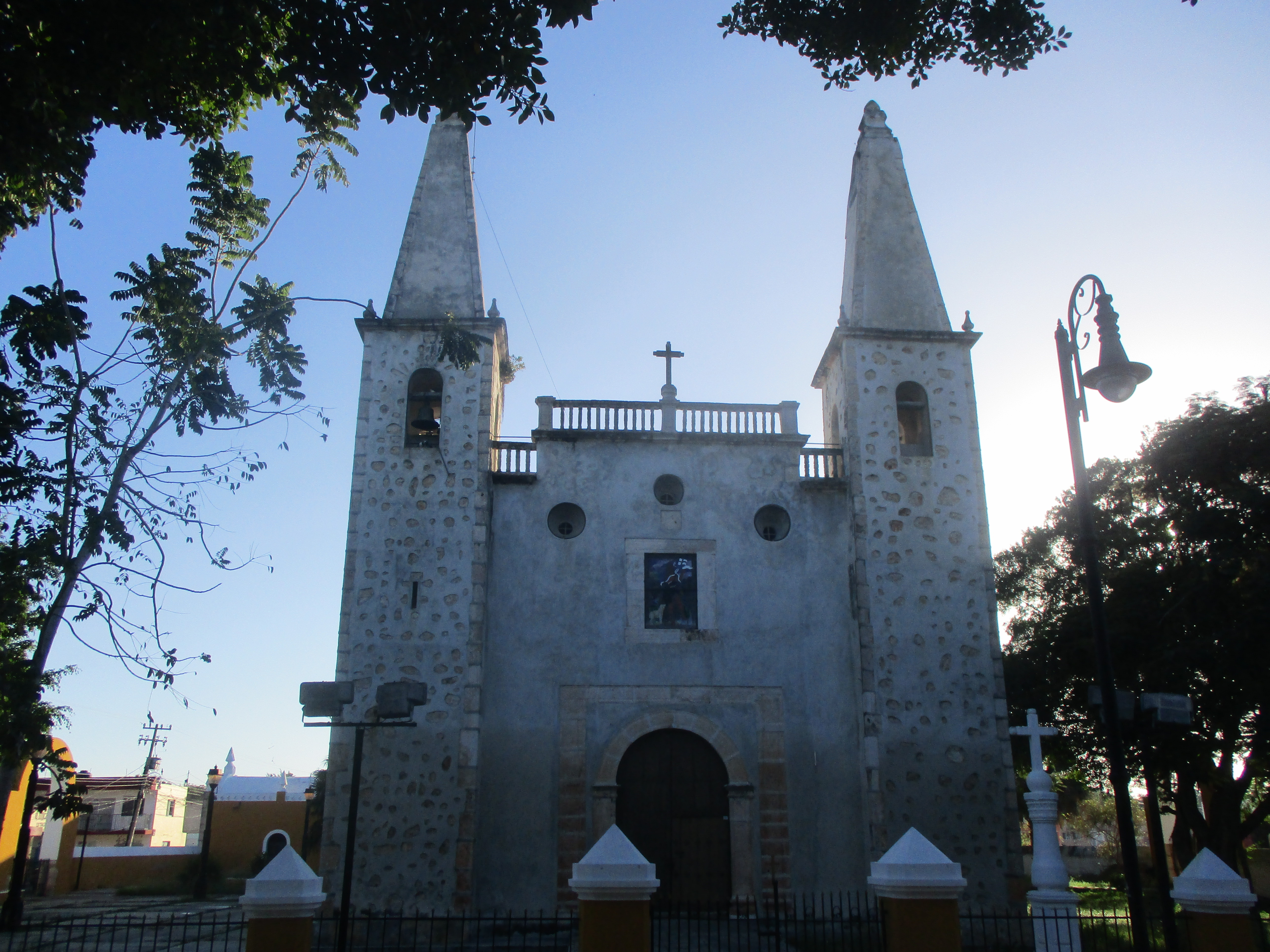
San Juan Church

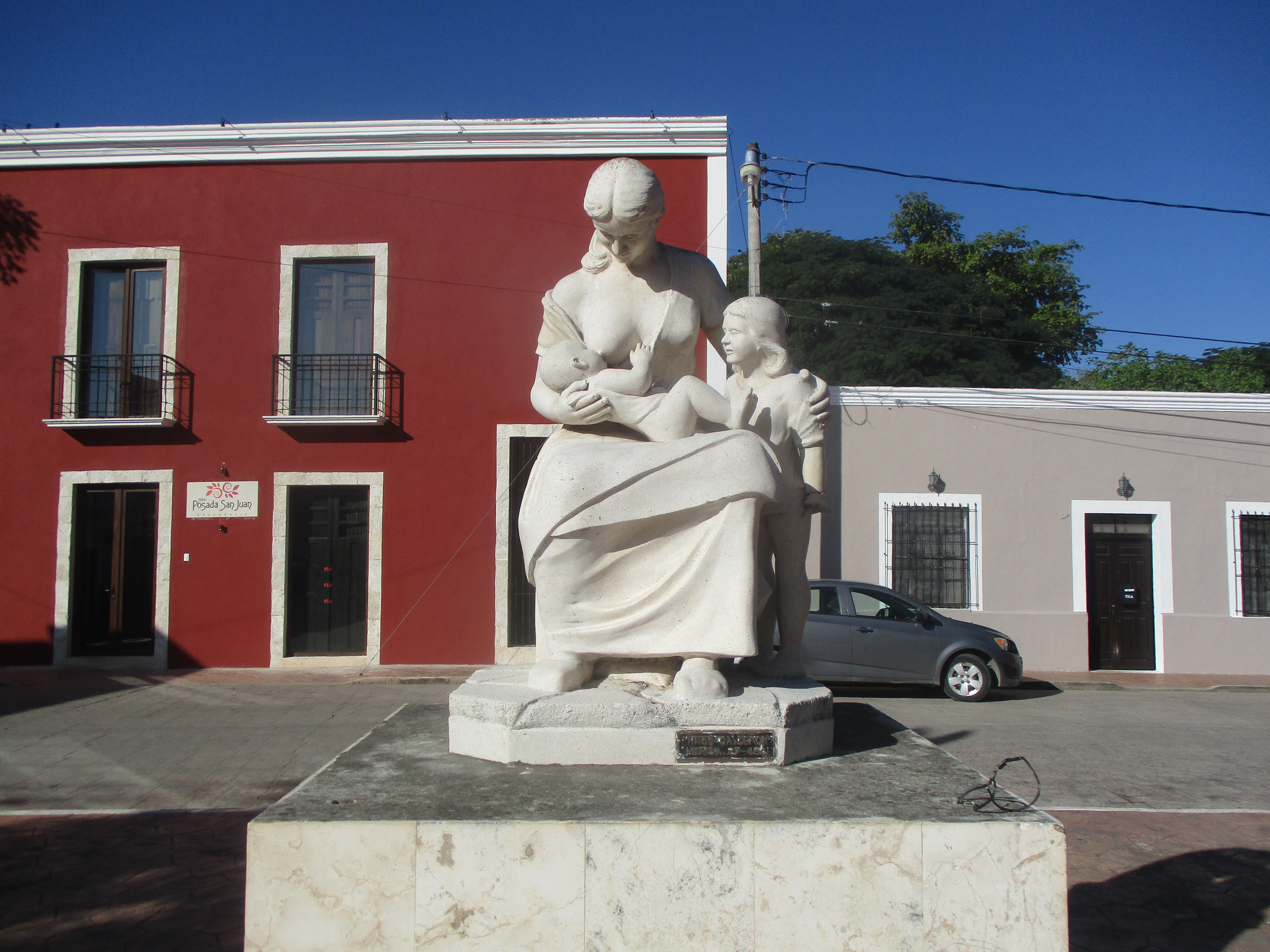
Monument to Motherhood

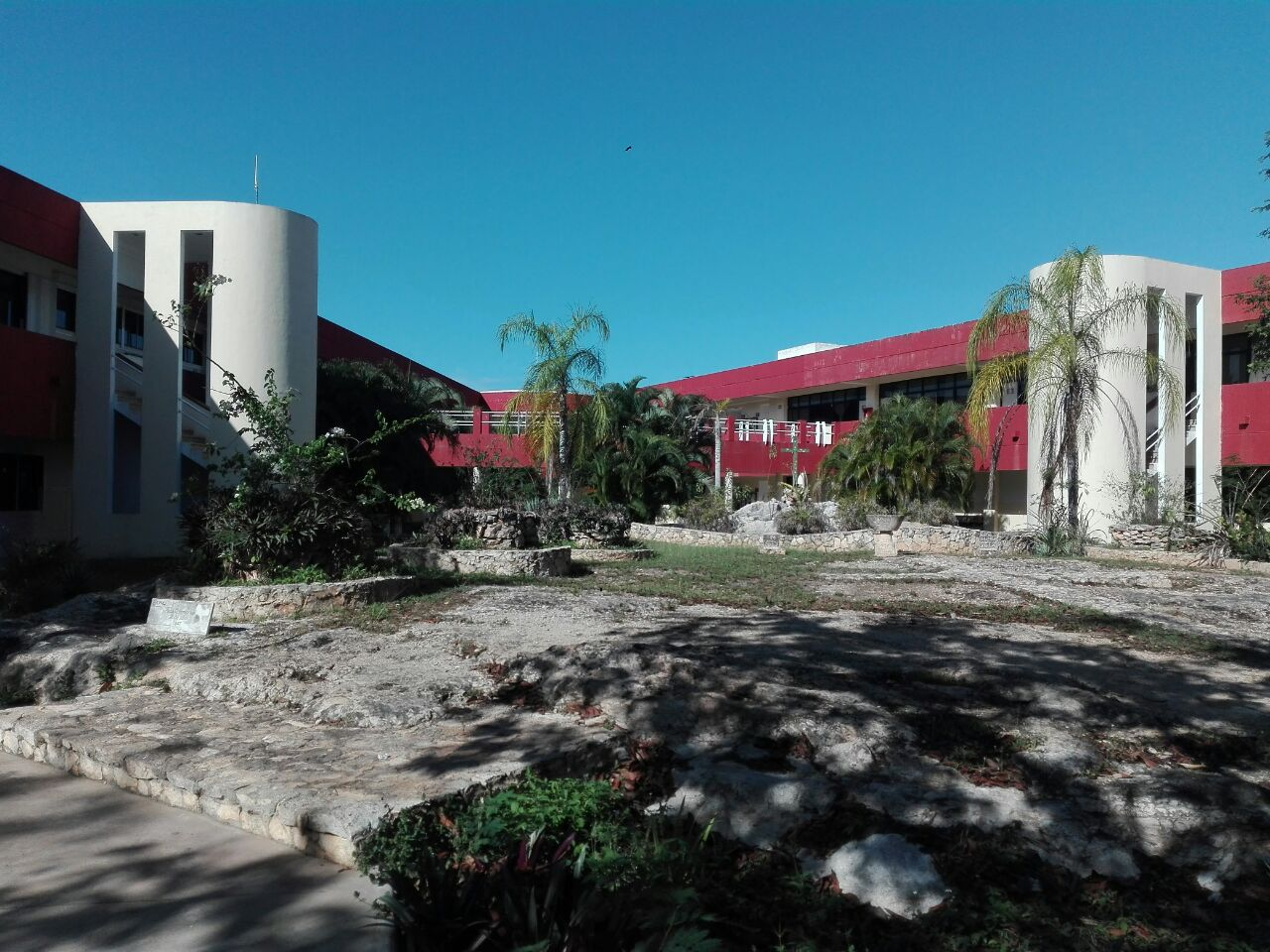
Universidad de Oriente

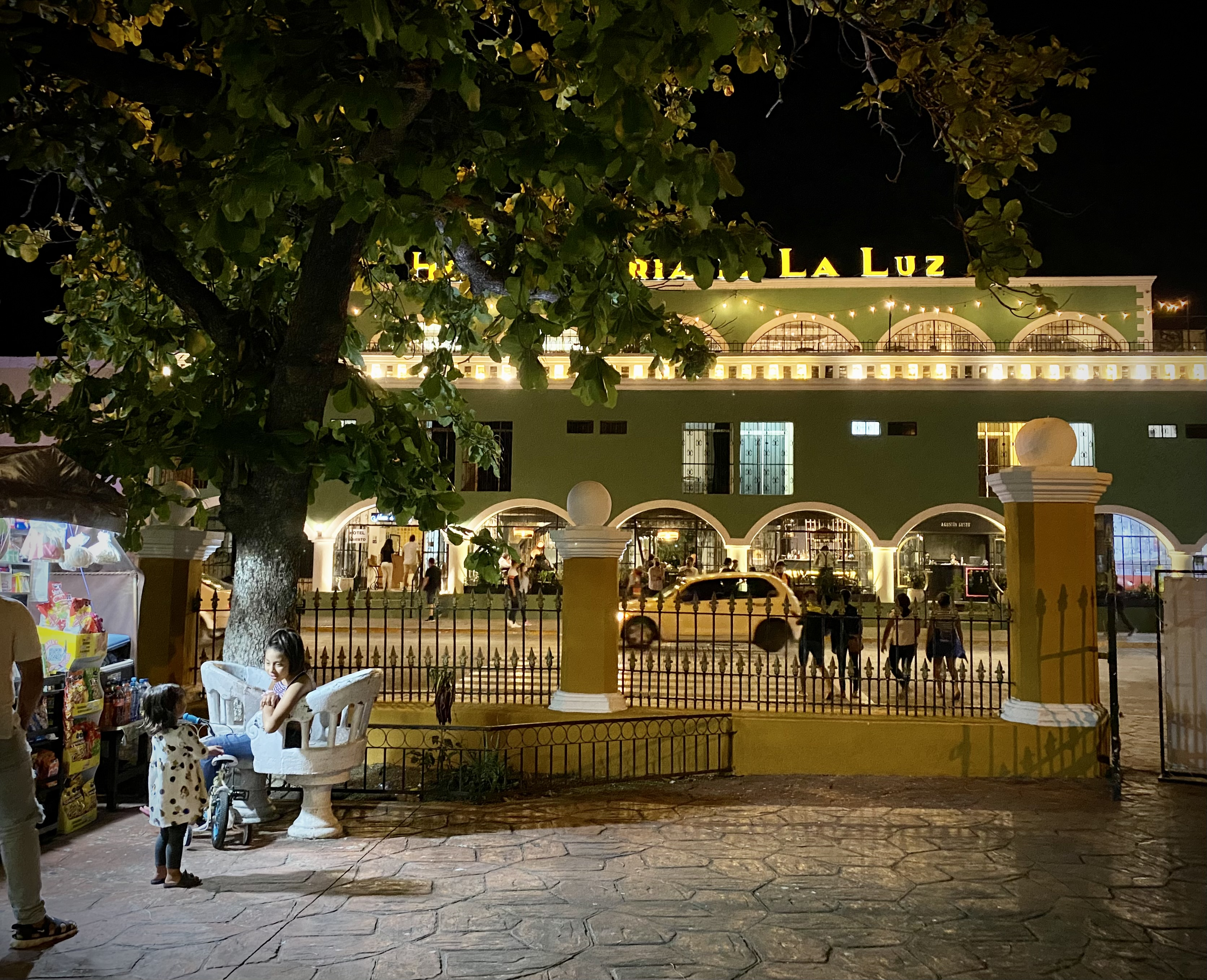
Hotel facing main plaza

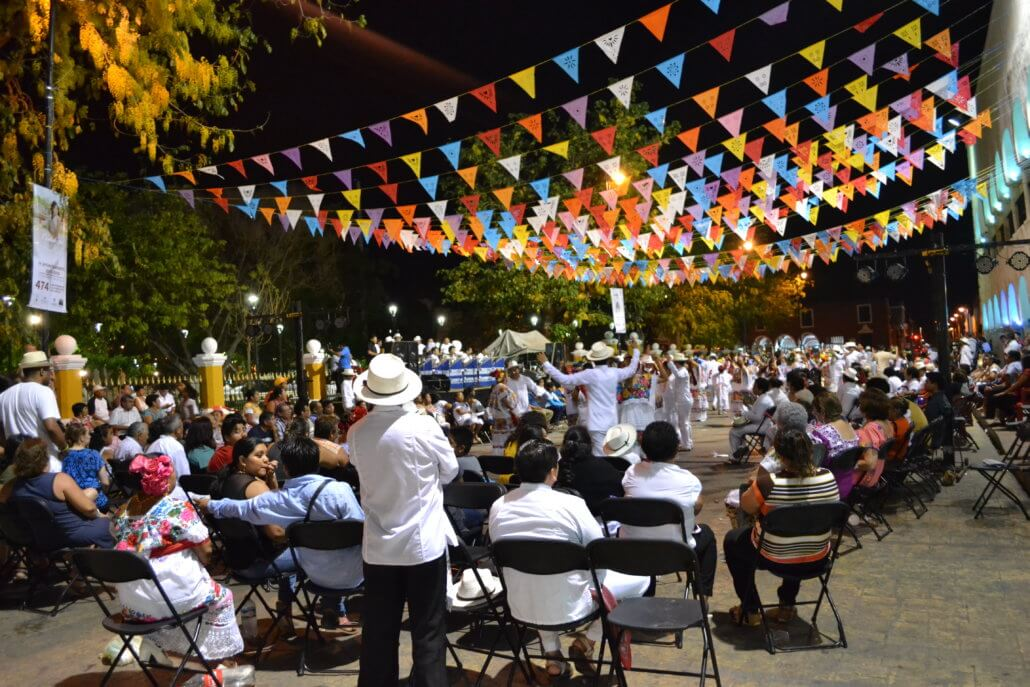
Celebration of anniversary of founding of the City
