= Arco Norte =

Toll highway in Mexico

Federal Highway M40D
- Carretera federal M40D
- Autopista Arco Norte; Libramiento Norte del Valle de México

Route information
- Maintained by Impulsora del Desarrollo y el Empleo en América Latina (IDEAL)
- Length: 223 km (139 mi)

Major junctions
- West end: Fed. 15D / Fed. 55 / Fed. 55D at Atlacomulco, State of Mexico
- Fed. 57D near Jilotepec de Abasolo, State of Mexico; Fed. 85 to Fed. 85D northeast of Tizayuca, Hidalgo; Fed. 132D / Fed. 132 near Tepeapulco, Hidalgo; Fed. 136 near Sanctórum, Tlaxcala; Fed. 117D to Fed. 117 near San Martín Texmelucan, Puebla
- East end: Fed. 150D at San Martín Texmelucan, Puebla

Location
- Country: Mexico

Highway system
- Mexican Federal Highways; List; Autopistas

The Arco Norte (lit.: Northern Arc), designated and signed as Federal Highway M40D, is a toll road in Mexico. It serves as a bypass around Greater Mexico City and currently links the Mexico-Puebla toll road on the east with the Mexico-Guadalajara toll road on the west.

The toll in 2017 for the entire 223 kilometres (139 mi) stretch of highway is 405 pesos.

== Route description ==
The highway begins east of Mexico City at Mexican Federal Highway 150D, near San Martín Texmelucan de Labastida, which lies just inside Puebla state. The highway has two lanes in each direction and begins northward through low mountains at 2,500 m (8,200 ft) above sea level. It continues through the western side of Tlaxcala state, then through the area where the states of Mexico and Hidalgo border each other, at about 2,400 m (7,900 ft) above sea level. The highway bends to the west, with few exits in the area. It serves few large population centers. As it reaches Tula, the area is greener and lies about 2,400 m (7,900 ft) above sea level. Then it rises to about 2400 m and meets the Mexico-Querétaro toll road, where it ended upon the opening of its first phase of 169 kilometres (105 mi) in 2009. A second phase of 54 kilometres (34 mi) opened two years later, extending the road west and south to Atlacomulco and the junction with Mexican Federal Highway 15D toward Guadalajara.

== History ==
Construction of the Arco Norte began on February 28, 2006. The first phase opened in July 2009 (between the Autopista Mexico-Puebla and the Autopista Mexico-Querétaro, 169 km [105 mi]). The second phase to Atlacomulco was formally opened on May 3, 2011.

== Junctions ==
Autopista Mexico City-Puebla

San Martín Texmelucan de Labastida

Sanctórum

Calpulalpan

Tepeapulco

Nopaltepec

Tizayuca

Ajoloapan

Atitalaquia

Tula

Tula-Norte

Autopista Mexico City-Querétaro

Jilotepec de Abasolo

Acambay

Mexican Federal Highway 15D/Mexican Federal Highway 57, Mexican Federal Highway 55, Mexican Federal Highway 55D, Atlacomulco
