= Mexican Federal Highway 117D =

Toll highway in Mexico

Federal Highway 117D
- Carretera federal 117D
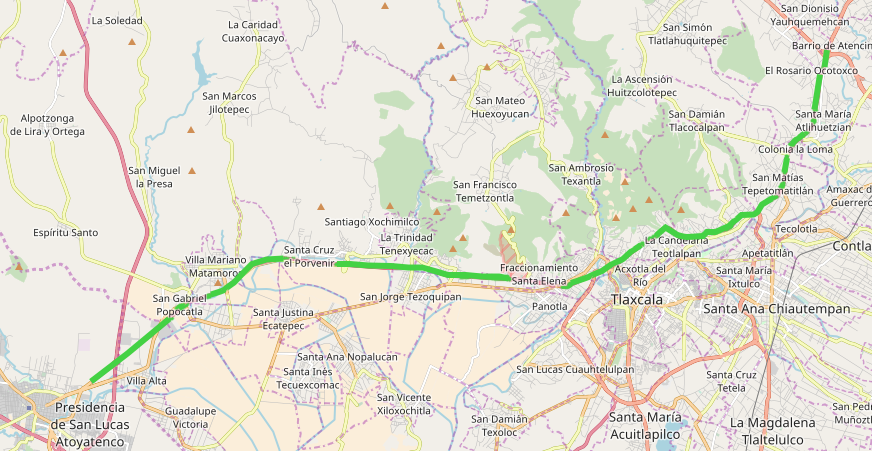

Route information
- Maintained by Promotora y Operadora de Infraestructura S.A. de C.V.

Autopista San Martín Texmelucan-Tlaxcala
- Length: 35.2 km (21.9 mi)
- North end: Fed. 136 / Fed. 119 in El Molinito, Tlaxcala
- Major intersections: Fed. 121 in Tlaxcala, Tlaxcala; Fed. 117D (Libramiento de Tlaxcala)
- South end: Fed. 117 in San Martín Texmelucan, Puebla

Libramiento de Tlaxcala
- Length: 11 km (6.8 mi)
- West end: Fed. 117D west of Tlaxcala
- Major intersections: Fed. 119
- East end: Fed. 121 east of Tlaxcala

Location
- Country: Mexico

Highway system
- Mexican Federal Highways; List; Autopistas

Federal Highway 117D is the designation for two toll highways in eastern Mexico.

== San Martín Texmelucan-Tlaxcala-El Molinito ==
The first of the two roads connects San Martín Texmelucan, Puebla to El Molinito, northeast of Tlaxcala City and southwest of Apizaco. The road is operated by Promotora y Operadora de Infraestructura S.A. de C.V. (PINFRA). A toll of 63 pesos per car is charged to travel between Texmelucan and Tlaxcala.

== Libramiento de Tlaxcala ==
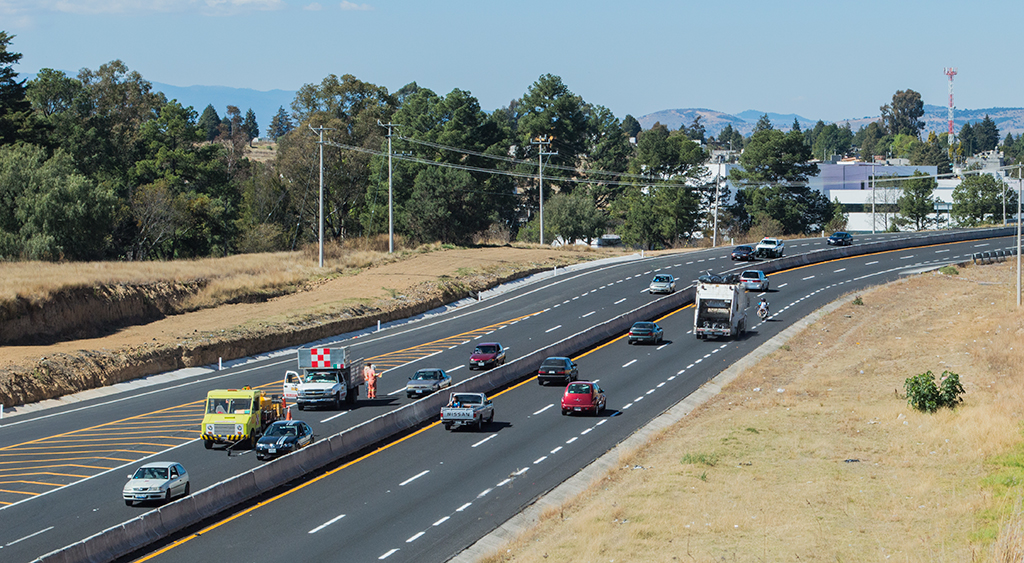
The Libramiento de Tlaxcala in April 2015, soon after its official opening

The 11 kilometres (6.8 mi) Libramiento de Tlaxcala serves as a southern bypass of the city, connecting the highway to Texmelucan, the state toll road between Puebla and Tlaxcala, and Mexican Federal Highway 121. It was inaugurated on March 27, 2015. The bypass's construction began in 2009, with three kilometers remaining unfinished from 2012 to 2015.
