= Mexican Federal Highway 47D =

Federal toll highway in Mexico

Federal Highway 47D
- Carretera federal 47D
- Macrolibramiento Palmillas-Apaseo el Grande; Libramiento Centenario de la Constitución de 1917

Route information
- Maintained by Empresas ICA
- Length: 90 km (56 mi)
- Existed: May 18, 2017–present

Major junctions
- East end: Fed. 45 at Palmillas, Querétaro
- Fed. 57D / Fed. 57 at Palmillas, Querétaro; Fed. 120 near Amealco de Bonfil, Querétaro; Fed. 45 at Apaseo el Alto, Guanajuato
- West end: Fed. 45D at Apaseo el Grande, Guanajuato

Location
- Country: Mexico

Highway system
- Mexican Federal Highways; List; Autopistas

The Macrolibramiento Palmillas-Apaseo el Grande, also known as the Libramiento Centenario de la Constitución de 1917 (Centennial of the Constitution of 1917 Bypass), is a toll highway in the Mexican states of Querétaro and Guanajuato, designed to serve as a large-scale bypass of Querétaro City and San Juan del Río, signed as Mexican Federal Highway 47D. It is operated by Empresas ICA and carries a toll of 75 pesos per car and 37 pesos per motorcycle.

== History ==
In 2012, ICA, member of the consortium Controladora de Operaciones de Infraestructura, S.A. de C.V., obtained a 30-year concession for the highway from Palmillas to Apaseo el Grande. This project was conceived in order to connect the Bajío region, home of an increasing number of industrial parks that generate truck traffic, to Mexico City without traversing Querétaro City and in less time; it was also considered the third-most important highway project of Enrique Peña Nieto's presidency and the most important for central Mexico.

Construction began in April 2013; while originally planned for completion in 2015, the road faced delays due to difficulties acquiring the road's right-of-way as well as with funding from the federal government and the higher cost of materials due to the weakness of the Mexican peso.

On May 15, 2017, the SCT announced that the highway was complete; it cost 5.755 billion pesos to build. Three days later, President Peña Nieto visited San Juan del Río to formally inaugurate the new highway. It is expected to carry 15,000 to 17,000 cars a day, reducing the load on Mexican Federal Highway 57D which carries 60,000 vehicles a day. From May 22 to May 26, Caminos y Puentes Federales charged a discounted "promotional" toll on the road in order to recover lost revenues from traffic loss on Highway 57D until ICA took over operation of the toll booths on May 27.

While the highway's mainline is complete, work is still in progress to build the road's nine interchanges and auxiliary toll booths that will connect the bypass to towns such as Amealco de Bonfil and Huimilpan. In addition to nine interchanges, the highway also features 23 underpasses, nine overpasses and 15 bridges.

== Route description ==
The four-lane Macrolibramiento Palmillas-Apaseo el Grande passes through six municipalities, four in Querétaro and two in Guanajuato. The road begins at an interchange with Mexican Federal Highway 45; shortly thereafter traffic headed for Celaya from Mexico City splits off from Mexican Federal Highway 57D at Palmillas, and immediately after is a full cloverleaf with Mexican Federal Highway 57, leading to Atlacomulco, State of Mexico, to the south. Two interchanges serve Amealco de Bonfil, including one with Mexican Federal Highway 120 at kilometer 31. At kilometer 46 is an exit serving Huimilpan. After the interchange to Coroneo at kilometer 63, the highway crosses from Querétaro into Guanajuato in Apaseo el Alto, where it boasts an interchange with Mexican Federal Highway 45; the mainline ends at Highway 45D in Apaseo el Grande.
