= Mexican Federal Highway 125 =

Highway in Mexico

Federal Highway 125
- Carretera federal 125

Route information
- Maintained by Secretariat of Infrastructure, Communications and Transportation
- Length: 494.9 km (307.5 mi)

North segment
- Length: 107.5 km (66.8 mi)
- North end: Fed. 140 in Conejos
- South end: Fed. 150 in Fortín de las Flores

Middle segment
- Length: 119.4 km (74.2 mi)
- North end: Fed. 135 in Tehuacán
- South end: Fed. 190 in Huajuapan de León

South segment
- Length: 268 km (167 mi)
- North end: Fed. 190 in Yucudaa
- South end: Fed. 200 in Pinotepa Nacional

Location
- Country: Mexico

Highway system
- Mexican Federal Highways; List; Autopistas
← Fed. 123	→ Fed. 126

Federal Highway 125 (Carretera Federal No. 125) is a Federal Highway of Mexico that runs from Veracruz south across the Sierra Madre Oriental to just north of the Pacific Ocean in Oaxaca. Federal Highway 125 is split into three segments: the first segment travels from Conejos, Veracruz in the north to Fortín de las Flores in the south. The second segment travels from Tehuacán, Puebla in the north to Huajuapan de León, Oaxaca in the south. The third segment travels from Yucudaa, Oaxaca to Pinotepa Nacional, Oaxaca.
