= Mexican Federal Highway 61 =

Highway in Mexico

Federal Highway 61
- Carretera federal 61

Route information
- Maintained by Secretariat of Communications and Transportation
- Length: 39 km (24 mi)

Major junctions
- West end: Fed. 120 in Acámbaro, Guanajuato
- Fed. 126 in Maravatío, Michoacán
- East end: Fed. 15D in Maravatío, Michoacán

Location
- Country: Mexico

Highway system
- Mexican Federal Highways; List; Autopistas
← Fed. 58	→ Fed. 62

Federal Highway 61 (Carretera Federal 61) (Fed. 61) is a free (libre) part of the federal highway corridors (los corredores carreteros federales) of Mexico, connecting Acámbaro, Guanajuato to Maravatío, Michoacán.
