= Mexican Federal Highway Q20 =

Highway in Mexico

Federal Highway Q20
- Carretera federal Q20
- Libramiento Surponiente de Querétaro

Route information
- Maintained by Secretariat of Infrastructure, Communications and Transportation
- Length: 45.70 km (28.40 mi)

Major junctions
- South end: SH 30 in Querétaro
- West end: Fed. 57 in Santa Rosa Jáuregui

Location
- Country: Mexico
- State: Querétaro

Highway system
- Mexican Federal Highways; List; Autopistas
← Fed. 307	→ Fed. 1

The Libramiento Surponiente de Querétaro (Querétaro Southwest Bypass), signed as Mexican Federal Highway Q20, is a thoroughfare that partially encircles the city of Querétaro. It is key for crossing the Santiago de Querétaro metropolitan area without entering the city center, connecting through traffic heading toward Guanajuato, Celaya, and Federal Highway 57. The central confined lanes are maintained by the federal government. Frontage segments of the road are maintained by the municipal government, which also provides lighting.
