= Libramiento Felipe Carrillo Puerto =

Toll highway in Mexico

Federal Highway 307D
- Carretera federal 307D
- Libramiento Felipe Carrillo Puerto

Route information
- Maintained by Banobras/Grupo Aldesa
- Length: 14.14 km (8.79 mi)
- Existed: July 23, 2016–present

Major junctions
- South end: Fed. 307 south of Felipe Carrillo Puerto
- Fed. 184 west of Felipe Carrillo Puerto
- North end: Fed. 307 north of Felipe Carrillo Puerto

Location
- Country: Mexico
- State: Quintana Roo

Highway system
- Mexican Federal Highways; List; Autopistas

The Libramiento Felipe Carrillo Puerto is a toll highway bypassing the city of Felipe Carrillo Puerto, Quintana Roo. It is operated by a consortium of Banobras and Grupo Aldesa, which charges cars 24 pesos to drive the full length of the bypass. It is the only road signed as Mexican Federal Highway 307D (Fed. 307D).

Unlike most other autopistas in Mexico, the highway is an undivided two-lane expressway for most of its route. The highway widens to a four-lane divided highway for about a kilometer near Fed. 295. The bypass has one toll booth, located at the Fed. 184 interchange.

== History ==
The bypass opened on July 23, 2016, after four years of construction and an investment of 444 million pesos. The road is designed to reroute long-haul traffic, such as that from Cancún to Chetumal, away from the city itself. A full dedication by Governor Carlos Joaquín González took place in July 2017.

== Junction list ==
The entire route is in Felipe Carrillo Puerto Municipality, Quintana Roo.

Location	km	mi	Destinations	Notes
	0.0	0.0	Fed. 307 – Bacalar, Chetumal, Felipe Carrillo Puerto, Cancún	Southern terminus of Fed. 307D
	6.0	3.7	Fed. 184 – Mérida, Muna, Felipe Carrillo Puerto	
	6.5	4.0	Toll booth	
	14.4	8.9	Fed. 307 – Cancún, Tulum, Felipe Carrillo Puerto	Northern terminus of Fed. 307D
1.000 mi = 1.609 km; 1.000 km = 0.621 mi: Electronic toll collection
