= Mexican Federal Highway 138 =

Highway in Mexico

Federal Highway 138
- Carretera federal 138

Route information
- Maintained by Secretariat of Infrastructure, Communications and Transportation
- Length: 23.12 km (14.37 mi)

Major junctions
- East end: Fed. 136 in San Bernardino
- West end: Fed. 132 in Tepexpan

Location
- Country: Mexico
- State: México

Highway system
- Mexican Federal Highways; List; Autopistas
← Fed. 136	→ Fed. 140

Federal Highway 138 (Carretera Federal 138) is a Federal Highway of Mexico. The highway is a short connector route that links San Bernardino, State of Mexico in the south to Tepexpan, State of Mexico in the north. In spite of being an even-numbered Federal Highway route, the highway is aligned north–south.
