= Mexican Federal Highway 134 =

Federal Highway 134
- Carretera federal 134

Route information
- Maintained by Secretariat of Infrastructure, Communications and Transportation
- Length: 464.6 km (288.7 mi)

Major junctions
- East end: Fed. 57D / Fed. 134D in Naucalpan
- Fed. 55D / Fed. 134D in Toluca
- West end: Fed. 200 in Zihuatanejo

Location
- Country: Mexico

Highway system
- Mexican Federal Highways; List; Autopistas
← Fed. 132	→ Fed. 135

Federal Highway 134 (Carretera Federal 134) is a Federal Highway of Mexico. The highway travels from Naucalpan, State of Mexico in the northeast to Zihuatanejo, Guerrero in the southwest. It crosses 3 states. State of Mexico, Michoacan and Guerrero.
