= Mexican Federal Highway 63 =

Highway in Mexico

Federal Highway 63
- Carretera federal 63

Route information
- Maintained by Secretariat of Communications and Transportation
- Length: 169.9 km (105.6 mi)

Major junctions
- North end: Fed. 57 in La Bonita, San Luis Potosí
- South end: Fed. 49 in Mexquitic

Location
- Country: Mexico
- State: San Luis Potosí

Highway system
- Mexican Federal Highways; List; Autopistas
← Fed. 62	→ Fed. 64

Federal Highway 63 (Carretera Federal 63) (Fed. 63) is a toll-free part of the federal highway corridors (los corredores carreteros federales) of Mexico. The highway connects the cities of Matehuala, San Luis Potosí and Mexquitic, San Luis Potosí.
