= Mexican Federal Highway 110D =

Toll highway in Mexico

Federal Highway 110D
- Carretera federal 110D
- Libramiento Norte de La Piedad

Route information
- Maintained by Empresas ICA (Autovía)
- Length: 21.389 km (13.291 mi)
- Existed: November 2012–present

Major junctions
- West end: Fed. 110 west of La Piedad, Michoacán by El Salitre
- Fed. 84 north of La Piedad, in Guanajuato
- East end: Fed. 90 at Laguna Larga de Cortés, Guanajuato

Location
- Country: Mexico

Highway system
- Mexican Federal Highways; List; Autopistas

Federal Highway 110D, also known as the Libramiento Norte de La Piedad, is a toll highway bypassing La Piedad, Michoacán. The road is operated by Empresas ICA. It opened to traffic in 2012 and bypasses La Piedad to the north, passing through Michoacán, Jalisco and Guanajuato.

“Libramiento Norte De La Piedad" passes through small “ranchos” but no exits or major junctions through them. 110D passes through the local “ranchos” or cities/towns of La Laguna De Cortes, El Guayabito De Pedroza, La Sarna, Los Ocotes, Estacion La Piedad, Santa Ana Pacueco, (Now in Michoacán) La Calerita, Quesera De Cortes, Capilla De Morales, (Now in Jalisco) Charapuato. (Again in Michoacán) Palo Blanco Del Salto, El Aguaje, and El Salitre. *All “ranchos”, cities/towns are in a 2-mile radius of the location to the Tollway NO MAJOR JUNCTIONS OR EXITS LEADING TO PLACES EXCEPT La Laguna De Cortes and Palo Blanco Del Salto.*

Attractions Near 110D include El Salto a 30-meter waterfall in the Lerma River.
