= Mexican Federal Highway 87 =

Highway in Mexico

Federal Highway 87
- Carretera federal 87

Route information
- Maintained by Secretariat of Communications and Transportation
- Length: 37.7 km (23.4 mi)

Major junctions
- North end: Tula, Hidalgo
- South end: Fed. 57D Jorobas, Estado de Mexico

Location
- Country: Mexico

Highway system
- Mexican Federal Highways; List; Autopistas
← Fed. 85	→ Fed. 90
← Fed. 30	Fed. 31	→ Fed. 33

Federal Highway 87 (Spanish: Carretera Federal 87, Fed. 87, Carretera Tula–Jorobas) is a highway in Mexico. The highways starts in the north in Tula de Allende, Hidalgo (state) at the Libramiento de Tula. The highway runs easterly approximately 3.25 kilometres (2.02 mi) then it turns south to end in Jorobas, Huehuetoca, State of Mexico, at Fed. 57D (Autopista Mexico-Queretaro, Carretera Coyotepec–Tepeji del Rio Ocampo) toll road. The total length of Fed. 87 is 37.7 kilometres (23.4 mi).
