= Mexican Federal Highway 123 =

Highway in Mexico

Federal Highway 123
- Carretera federal 123

Route information
- Maintained by Secretariat of Infrastructure, Communications and Transportation
- Length: 37.5 km (23.3 mi)

Major junctions
- North end: Fed. 150D in Orizaba
- South end: Zongolica

Location
- Country: Mexico
- State: Veracruz

Highway system
- Mexican Federal Highways; List; Autopistas
← Fed. 121	→ Fed. 125

Federal Highway 123 (Carretera Federal 123) is a Federal Highway of Mexico. The highway travels entirely within the state of Veracruz from Orizaba in the north to Zongolica in the south.
