= Mexican Federal Highway 62 =

Highway in Mexico

Federal Highway 62
- Carretera federal 62

Route information
- Maintained by Secretariat of Communications and Transportation
- Length: 118.23 km (73.46 mi)

Major junctions
- East end: Fed. 57 in Matehuala
- West end: Fed. 54 in San Tiburcio

Location
- Country: Mexico

Highway system
- Mexican Federal Highways; List; Autopistas
← Fed. 61	→ Fed. 63

Federal Highway 62 (Carretera Federal 62) (Fed. 62) is a free (libre) part of the federal highways corridors (los corredores carreteros federales) of Mexico. The highway travels from San Tiburcio, Zacatecas to Matehuala, San Luis Potosí.
