= Mexican Federal Highway 182 =

Highway in Mexico

Federal Highway 182
- Carretera federal 182

Route information
- Maintained by Secretariat of Communications and Transportation
- Length: 185 km (115 mi)

Major junctions
- East end: Fed. 175 in San Juan Bautista Tuxtepec
- West end: Fed. 135 in Teotitlán de Flores Magón

Location
- Country: Mexico
- State: Oaxaca

Highway system
- Mexican Federal Highways; List; Autopistas
| ← Fed. 180 | → Fed. 184 |

Federal Highway 182 (Carretera Federal 182) is a Federal Highway of Mexico. The highway travels from San Juan Bautista Tuxtepec, Oaxaca in the east to Teotitlán de Flores Magón, Oaxaca in the west.
