= Mexican Federal Highway 53 =

Highway in Mexico

Federal Highway 53
- Carretera federal 53

Route information
- Maintained by Secretariat of Infrastructure, Communications and Transportation
- Length: 521.61 km (324.11 mi) Length includes 115.71 kilometres (71.90 mi) concurrent with Fed. 57

Major junctions
- South end: Fed. 85 near Apodaca, N.L.
- Fed. 38 in General Escobedo Fed. 57 near Castaños, Coah. Fed. 30 in Monclova Fed. 57 in Nueva Rosita
- North end: Boquillas del Carmen near Mexico – United States border

Location
- Country: Mexico
- States: Nuevo León, Coahuila

Highway system
- Mexican Federal Highways; List; Autopistas
← Fed. 52	→ Fed. 54
← Fed. 19	Fed. 20	→ Fed. 22

Federal Highway 53 (Carretera Federal 53) (Fed. 53) is part of the toll-free (libre) federal highways of Mexico, and connects metropolitan Monterrey, Nuevo León to Boquillas del Carmen, Coahuila near the Mexico–United States border.

Lengths
	km	mi
N.L.	115.90	72.02
Coah.	405.71	252.10
Total	521.61	324.11

== Major intersections ==
- Southern terminus at Fed. 85 near Apodaca, N.L.
- Fed. 38 in General Escobedo
- Fed. 57 near Castaños, Coah.
- Fed. 30 in Monclova
- Fed. 57 in Nueva Rosita

The northern terminus is at Boquillas del Carmen near the Mexico–United States border along the Rio Grande.
