= Mexican Federal Highway 93D =

Toll highway in Mexico

Federal Highway 93D
- Carretera federal 93D
- Libramiento Chilpancingo-Tixtla; Libramiento Norte Chilpancingo-Montaña Baja

Route information
- Maintained by Caminos y Puentes Federales, by contract for the Guerrero State Highway and Airport Infrastructure Commission
- Length: 20.6 km (12.8 mi)
- Existed: 2011–present

Major junctions
- West end: Fed. 95D / Fed. 95 in Chilpancingo, Guerrero
- East end: Fed. 93 in Tixtla, Guerrero

Location
- Country: Mexico
- State: Guerrero

Highway system
- Mexican Federal Highways; List; Autopistas

Federal Highway 93D is a toll highway in Guerrero. It connects the cities of Chilpancingo and Tixtla de Guerrero. The road is operated by Caminos y Puentes Federales, which in 2011 charged cars 20 pesos to travel Highway 93D.

The road has been referred to as the "corridor of death" due to the frequent findings of murdered bodies in the area.

The toll plaza was moved from near the east end to near the west end between 2022 and 2024.
