= Mexican Federal Highway 55D =

Toll highway in Mexico

Federal Highway 55D
- Carretera federal 55D

Route information
- Maintained by Secretariat of Infrastructure, Communications and Transportation
- Length: 152.12 km (94.52 mi)

Major junctions
- North end: Fed. 15D / Fed. M40D / Fed. 55 in Atlacomulco
- South end: Fed. 55 near Ixtapan de la Sal

Location
- Country: Mexico
- State: México

Highway system
- Mexican Federal Highways; List; Autopistas
← Fed. 55	→ Fed. 57

Federal Highway 55D (Carretera Federal 55D) is a part of the federal highways corridors (Spanish: los corredores carreteros federales) of Mexico as an autopista. The highway connects Atlacomulco to the north and Toluca to the south.
