= Mexican Federal Highway 119D =

Toll highway in Mexico

Federal Highway 119D
- Carretera federal 119D
- Autopista Tlaxco-Tejocotal

Route information
- Maintained by Promotora y Operadora de Infraestructura S.A. de C.V.
- Length: 72 km (45 mi)

Major junctions
- North end: Fed. 119 to Fed. 130 / Fed. 132D in Tejocotal, Hidalgo
- South end: Fed. 119 in Tlaxco Municipality, Tlaxcala

Location
- Country: Mexico

Highway system
- Mexican Federal Highways; List; Autopistas

Federal Highway 119D is a toll highway connecting Tejocotal, Hidalgo to Tlaxco Municipality, Tlaxcala. The road is operated by Promotora y Operadora de Infraestructura S.A. de C.V. (PINFRA).
