= Mexican Federal Highway 259 =

Highway in Mexico

Federal Highway 259
- Carretera federal 259

Route information
- Maintained by Secretariat of Infrastructure, Communications and Transportation

Location
- Country: Mexico

Highway system
- Mexican Federal Highways; List; Autopistas
← Fed. 254	→ Fed. 261

Federal Highway 259 (Carretera Federal 259) is a Federal Highway of Mexico.
