= Mexican Federal Highway 293 =

Highway in Mexico

Federal Highway 293
- Carretera federal 293

Route information
- Maintained by Secretariat of Infrastructure, Communications and Transportation
- Length: 99 km (62 mi)

Major junctions
- Northwest end: Fed. 184 at Polyuc, Q. Roo
- Southeast end: Fed. 307 near Pedro Antonio Santos, Quintana Roo

Location
- Country: Mexico
- State: Quintana Roo

Highway system
- Mexican Federal Highways; List; Autopistas
← Fed. 281	→ Fed. 295

Federal Highway 293 (Carretera Federal 293) is a Federal Highway of Mexico, located entirely within Quintana Roo. It connects Mexican Federal Highway 184 at Polyuc to Mexican Federal Highway 307 near Pedro Antonio Santos.

== Major intersections ==
The entire route is in Quintana Roo.

Municipality	Location	km	mi	Destinations	Notes
Bacalar				Fed. 307 – Cancún, Felipe Carrillo Puerto, Chetumal, Escárcega	Southern terminus
Bacalar	La Pantera			SH 16 – Margarita Maza de Juárez	
Felipe Carrillo Puerto	Polyuc			Fed. 184 – Mérida, José María Morelos, Felipe Carrillo Puerto	Northern terminus
1.000 mi = 1.609 km; 1.000 km = 0.621 mi
