= Mexican Federal Highway 91D =

Toll highway in Mexico

Federal Highway 91D
- Carretera federal 91D
- Autopista Puente de Ixtla-Iguala

Route information
- Maintained by Caminos y Puentes Federales
- Length: 62.8 km (39.0 mi)

Major junctions
- North end: Fed. 95D in Puente de Ixtla Municipality, Morelos
- Fed. 95 in Amacuzac, Puente de Ixtla Municipality, Morelos; Fed. 92D at Zacapalco, Guerrero
- South end: Fed. 95 in Iguala, Guerrero

Location
- Country: Mexico

Highway system
- Mexican Federal Highways; List; Autopistas

Federal Highway 91D is a toll highway between Puente de Ixtla, Morelos and Iguala, Guerrero. The road is operated by Caminos y Puentes Federales. The toll is 70 pesos per car to travel Highway 91D.
