= Mexican Federal Highway 132D =

Toll highway in Mexico

Federal Highway 132D
- Carretera federal 132D
- Autopista México-Tuxpan

Route information
- Maintained by Secretariat of Communications and Transportation

Location
- Country: Mexico

Highway system
- Mexican Federal Highways; List; Autopistas

Federal Highway 132D is the designation for toll highways paralleling Mexican Federal Highway 132. Highway 132D forms most of the Mexico City-Tuxpan highway corridor, with contiguous segments in the State of Mexico and from Tulancingo, Hidalgo to Tihuatlán, Veracruz.

== Ecatepec-Pirámides ==
Autopista Ecatepec-Pirámides
- Location: Fed. 85D in Ecatepec de Morelos to Fed. 132 northeast of Pirámides
- Length: 22.2 km (13.8 mi)

The highway from Ecatepec de Morelos to Pirámides, the only segment in the State of Mexico, is the first segment out of Mexico City on Highway 132D. It begins at Mexican Federal Highway 85D (Pachuca—Mexico City) in Ecatepec and immediately features its first toll plaza, turning northeast. At Acolmán, a junction is built to serve as the northern terminus of the Autopista Pirámides-Texcoco, which when fully built will provide access to the New International Airport for Mexico City. The road is operated by PINFRA, which charges cars a 73-peso toll to use all 22.2 kilometres (13.8 mi) of the road.

Mexican Federal Highway 132 covers the distance from Pirámides to near Tulancingo, including intersections with the Autopista Arco Norte and the unnumbered federal highway to Pachuca and Ciudad Sahagún.

== Tulancingo-Venta Grande and Tejocotal-Nuevo Necaxa ==
Autopista Entronque Tulancingo-Venta Grande Autopista Tejocotal-Nuevo Necaxa
- Location: Fed. 130 southwest of Tulancingo, Hidalgo to Fed. 130 in Nuevo Necaxa, Puebla
- Length: 58.3 km (36.2 mi)

Highway 132D picks up again southwest of Tulancingo at an interchange with Mexican Federal Highway 130. It bypasses the city entirely, heading northeast past Tejocotal, where it meets Highway 130 and another toll plaza, before reaching Tejocotal Lake, the dividing line between segments, where it intersects Highway 130 with access to Mexican Federal Highway 119D, which connects Tejocotal to Tlaxco, Tlaxcala. East of Tejocotal, Highway 132D serves as a bypass of Huauchinango, with an interchange on the east side with Highway 130 to access the city and its own toll plaza.

Caminos y Puentes Federales operates the two segments of road and charges a combined 52-peso toll for short itineraries, paid at Tejocotal and covering the road to Nuevo Necaxa; for long-haul trips, this rises to 76 pesos.

== Nuevo Necaxa-Tihuatlán ==
Autopista Nuevo Necaxa-Tihuatlán
- Location: Fed. 130 in Nuevo Necaxa, Puebla to Fed. 180 / Fed. 130D in Tihuatlán, Veracruz
- Length: 84.78 km (52.68 mi)

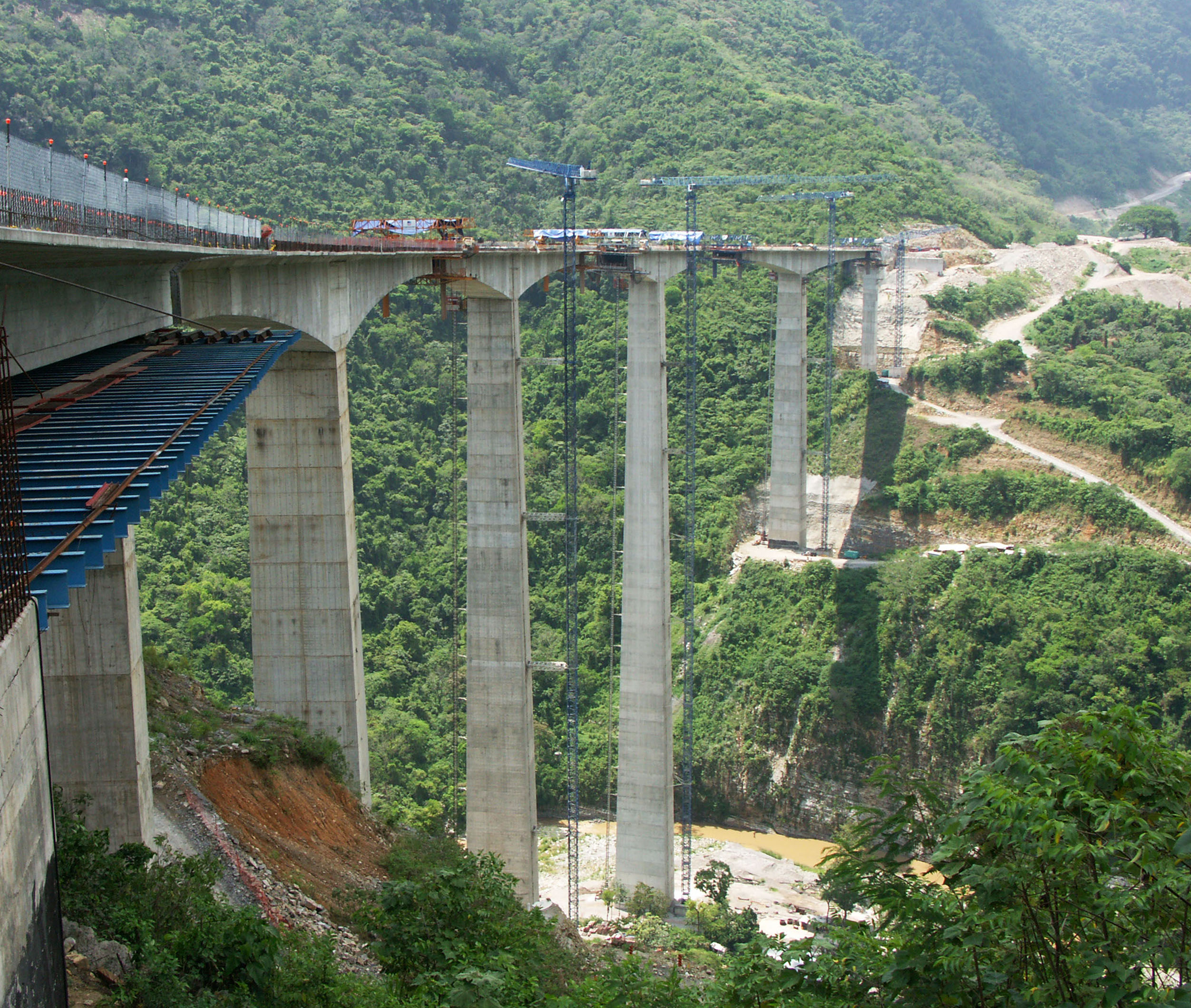
The San Marcos Bridge under construction in 2012

The last stretch of Highway 132D to be completed, with inauguration in 2014, is the stretch that leaves Huauchinango and the town of Nuevo Necaxa. This stretch passes Xicotepec de Juárez, with a number of tunnels, and is carried on the 850-metre (2,790 ft) long and 225-metre (738 ft) deep San Marcos Bridge, formally named for Gilberto Borja Navarrete and the second longest of its type in the world.

Northeast of the bridge, a spur provides access to Villa Ávila Camacho, which marks the end of the final completed leg; after the spur, the road straightens out and heads due northeast for Tihuatlán in Veracruz. At the interchange with Mexican Federal Highway 180 south of Tihuatlán, the 132D designation ends, and traffic continues straight on Mexican Federal Highway 130D bound for Tuxpan. The completion of this segment reduced travel times from Mexico City to Tuxpan to 2 hours 45 minutes, where the trip previously took six hours.

Upon its completion, Obrasweb awarded this segment of Highway 130D as its "Project of the Year" for 2015.

Autovía Nuevo Necaxa-Tihuatlán, S.A. de C.V. (AUNETI), which is jointly owned by Globalvia and Empresas ICA, operates the roadway and charges a 142-peso toll.
