= Mexican Federal Highway 126 =

Highway in Mexico

Federal Highway 126
- Carretera federal 126

Route information
- Maintained by Secretariat of Infrastructure, Communications and Transportation
- Length: 139.2 km (86.5 mi)

Major junctions
- East end: El Oro de Hidalgo
- West end: Morelia

Location
- Country: Mexico

Highway system
- Mexican Federal Highways; List; Autopistas
← Fed. 125	→ Fed. 127

Federal Highway 126 (Carretera Federal 126, Fed. 126) is a free (libre) part of the federal highways corridors (los corredores carreteros federales) of Mexico. The highway runs from Morelia, Michoacán in the west to El Oro de Hidalgo, State of Mexico in the east. The eastern portion of the highway continues on to Atlacomulco as Fed. 5. The two nearest federal highways to the western and eastern termini of Fed. 126 are Fed. 55 in Atlacomulco and Fed. 15 in Morelia.
