= Mexican Federal Highway 184 =

Highway in Mexico

Federal Highway 184
- Carretera federal 184

Route information
- Maintained by Secretariat of Infrastructure, Communications and Transportation
- Length: 216.97 km (134.82 mi)

Major junctions
- East end: Fed. 307 in Felipe Carrillo Puerto
- West end: Fed. 261 in Muna

Location
- Country: Mexico

Highway system
- Mexican Federal Highways; List; Autopistas
← Fed. 182	→ Fed. 185

Federal Highway 184 (Carretera Federal 184) is a Federal Highway of Mexico. The highway travels from Felipe Carrillo Puerto, Quintana Roo in the southeast to Muna, Yucatán in the northwest.
