= Mexican Federal Highway 136D =

Toll highway in Mexico

Federal Highway 136D
- Carretera federal 136D
- Autopista Peñón-Texcoco

Route information
- Maintained by Concesionaria PAC, S.A. de C.V./Operadora Metropolitana de Carreteras, S. A. de C. V.
- Length: 16.5 km (10.3 mi)
- Existed: March 26, 1993–present

Major junctions
- West end: Circuito Exterior Mexiquense (western spur) at Peñón, State of Mexico
- Circuito Exterior Mexiquense east of Peñón, State of Mexico (no access from Highway 136D)
- East end: Mexico State Route 142 in Texcoco, State of Mexico

Location
- Country: Mexico
- State: México

Highway system
- Mexican Federal Highways; List; Autopistas

Federal Highway 136D is a toll highway connecting the communities of Peñón and Texcoco in the State of Mexico. The 16.5-kilometre (10.3 mi) road is operated by Concesionaria PAC, S.A. de C.V. and Operadora Metropolitana de Carreteras, S. A. de C. V., which charge cars 42 pesos to travel the full length of the road.

== History ==
Highway 136D opened on March 26, 1993.

The road is currently four lanes but is set to be widened to ten in conjunction with the New International Airport for Mexico City project; the road will be the primary point of access to the new airport. The project includes lanes that will go directly from the Mexico City metro to the airport without having to pay a toll.
