= List of highways numbered 136 =

Route 136, or Highway 136, can refer to:

== Argentina ==
- National Route 136 (Argentina)

== Canada ==
- Ontario Highway 136 (former)
- Prince Edward Island Route 136
- Quebec Route 136 (Montreal)
- Quebec Route 136 (Quebec City)

== Costa Rica ==
- National Route 136

== France ==
- D136 as at Guillaucourt or Tortefontaine
- Périphérique de Rennes (N136), Rennes

== Germany ==
- L 136 state road from Gräfenhainichen to Möhlau via Zschornewitz

== India ==
- National Highway 136 (India)

== Ireland ==
- R136 road

== Japan ==
- Japan National Route 136
- Fukuoka Prefectural Route 136 from Sawara-ku, Fukuoka southeast to Miyaki District, Saga
- Nara Prefectural Route 136

== Malaysia ==
- FT 136 Malaysia Federal Route 136
- J136 Jalan Kesang Laut

== Mexico ==
- Mexican Federal Highway 136
  - Mexican Federal Highway 136D

== Norway ==
- European route E136

== Sweden ==
- Route 136 (Öland, Sweden)

== United Kingdom ==
- A136

== United States ==
- U.S. Route 136
- Alabama State Route 136
  - County Route 136 (Lee County, Alabama)
- Arkansas Highway 136
- California State Route 136
- Colorado State Highway 136
- Connecticut Route 136
- Florida State Road 136
  - County Road 136 (Suwannee County, Florida)
    - County Road 136A (Suwannee County, Florida)
- Georgia State Route 136
- Illinois Route 136
- Indiana State Road 136 (former)
- Iowa Highway 136
- K-136 (Kansas highway)
- Kentucky Route 136
- Louisiana Highway 136
  - Louisiana State Route 136 (former)
- Maine State Route 136
- Maryland Route 136
- Massachusetts Route 136
- M-136 (Michigan highway)
- New Hampshire Route 136
- New Mexico State Road 136
- New York State Route 136
  - County Route 136A (Cayuga County, New York)
  - County Route 136 (Cortland County, New York)
  - County Route 136 (Herkimer County, New York)
  - County Route 136 (Jefferson County, New York)
  - County Route 136 (Niagara County, New York)
  - County Route 136 (Westchester County, New York)
- North Carolina Highway 136
- Ohio State Route 136
- Oklahoma State Highway 136
- Pennsylvania Route 136
- Rhode Island Route 136
- South Dakota Highway 136 (former)
- Tennessee State Route 136
- Texas State Highway 136
  - Texas State Highway Spur 136
  - Farm to Market Road 136
- Utah State Route 136
  - Utah State Route 136 (1933-1969) (former)
- Virginia State Route 136
  - Virginia State Route 136 (1930-1933) (former)
  - Virginia State Route 136 (1933-1948) (former)
- Wisconsin Highway 136
- Wyoming Highway 136

Territories

- Puerto Rico Highway 136

Preceded by 135	Lists of highways 136	Succeeded by 137
