= Mexican Federal Highway 92D =

Toll highway in Mexico

Federal Highway 92D
- Carretera federal 92D
- Autopista Rancho Viejo-Taxco/Taxco-Zacapalco

Route information
- Maintained by Caminos y Puentes Federales
- Length: 25.3 km (15.7 mi)

Major junctions
- West end: Fed. 95 in Taxco de Alarcón, Guerrero
- East end: Fed. 91D in Zacapalco, Guerrero

Location
- Country: Mexico
- State: Guerrero

Highway system
- Mexican Federal Highways; List; Autopistas

Federal Highway 92D is a toll highway in Guerrero, with contiguous segments connecting Taxco to Rancho Viejo and Rancho Viejo to Zacapalco. The road is operated by Caminos y Puentes Federales, which charges 42 pesos per car to travel Highway 92D (14 for the first segment and 28 for the second).
