= Mexican Federal Highway 127 =

Highway in Mexico

Federal Highway 127
- Carretera federal 127

Route information
- Maintained by Secretariat of Infrastructure, Communications and Transportation
- Length: 306.05 km (190.17 mi)

North segment
- Length: 225.05 km (139.84 mi)
- North end: Fed. 70 north of Pánuco
- South end: Fed. 130 / Fed. 180 in Tihuatlán

South segment
- Length: 81 km (50 mi)
- North end: Fed. 130 / Fed. 180 in Poza Rica
- South end: Fed. 129 in Maria de la Torre

Location
- Country: Mexico

Highway system
- Mexican Federal Highways; List; Autopistas
← Fed. 126	→ Fed. 128

Federal Highway 127 (Carretera Federal 127) is a Federal Highway of Mexico. Federal Highway 127 is split into two segments: the first segment travels from Pánuco, Veracruz in the north to Tihuatlán in the south. The second segment travels from Poza Rica in the north to Martínez de la Torre in the south.
