= Mexican Federal Highway 281 =

Highway in Mexico

Federal Highway 281
- Carretera federal 281

Route information
- Maintained by Secretariat of Infrastructure, Communications and Transportation
- Length: 89 km (55 mi)

Major junctions
- West end: Calle 4 in Celestún, Yucatán
- East end: Fed. 261 in Mérida, Yucatán

Location
- Country: Mexico
- State: Yucatán

Highway system
- Mexican Federal Highways; List; Autopistas
← Fed. 261	→ Fed. 293

Federal Highway 281 (Carretera Federal 281) is a Federal Highway of Mexico, located entirely within the state of Yucatán. It connects Celestún to Mérida, with a 23.2-kilometre (14.4 mi) spur from Hunucmá to Sisal. Within Mérida, the street is known as Avenida Jacinto Canek.
