= Mexican Federal Highway 58 =

Highway in Mexico

Federal Highway 58
- Carretera federal 58

Route information
- Maintained by Secretariat of Communications and Transportation
- Length: 98 km (61 mi)

Major junctions
- East end: Fed. 85 in Linares
- West end: Fed. 57 in San Roberto Junction

Location
- Country: Mexico
- State: Nuevo León

Highway system
- Mexican Federal Highways; List; Autopistas
← Fed. 57	→ Fed. 61

Federal Highway 58 (Carretera Federal 58) (Fed. 58) is a toll-free (libre) part of the federal highways corridors (los corredores carreteros federales) of Mexico. The highway travels from San Roberto Junction, Nuevo León in the west to Linares, Nuevo León in the east.
