= Mexican Federal Highway 110 =

Highway in Mexico

Federal Highway 110
- Carretera federal 110

Route information
- Maintained by Secretariat of Infrastructure, Communications and Transportation
- Length: 475.39 km (295.39 mi)

East segment
- Length: 125.29 km (77.85 mi)
- East end: San Luis de la Paz
- West end: Fed. 45 in Los Infantes

West segment
- Length: 350.1 km (217.5 mi)
- East end: Fed. 90 in Patti
- West end: Fed. 200 near Tecoman

Location
- Country: Mexico

Highway system
- Mexican Federal Highways; List; Autopistas
← Fed. 107	→ Fed. 111

Federal Highway 110 (Carretera Federal 110) is a Federal Highway of Mexico.
