= Mexican Federal Highway 30 =

Highway in Mexico

Federal Highway 30
- Carretera federal 30

Route information
- Maintained by Secretariat of Communications and Transportation
- Length: 351.0 km (218.1 mi)

Major junctions
- East end: Fed. 57 in Monclova
- West end: Fed. 40 in Torreón

Location
- Country: Mexico
- State: Coahuila

Highway system
- Mexican Federal Highways; List; Autopistas
← Fed. 29	→ Fed. 31

Federal Highway 30 (Spanish: Carretera Federal 30, Fed. 30) is a free part of the federal highways corridors (Spanish: los corredores carreteros federales). The highway starts in Torreón at Fed. 40 in the southwest and winds across the central Mexican Plateau, following a roughly northeasterly direction. The highway eventually ends to the northeast in Monclova, Coahuila at Fed. 57. The total length of Fed. 30 is 351.0 km (218.1 mi).

The main Fed. 30 trunk runs from Torreón to Monclova at a length of 332.3 km (206.5 mi). At San Pedro de las Colonias, an additional 18.7 km (11.6 mi) spur reconnects Fed. 30 with Fed. 40 in La Cuchilla, Coahuila.
