= Mexican Federal Highway 119 =

Highway in Mexico

Federal Highway 119
- Carretera federal 119
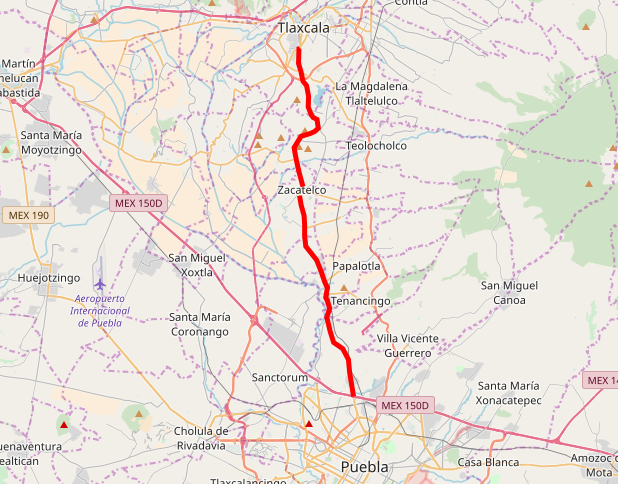

Route information
- Maintained by Secretariat of Infrastructure, Communications and Transportation
- Length: 146.37 km (90.95 mi)

North segment
- Length: 113.15 km (70.31 mi)
- North end: Fed. 130 in Tejocotal
- South end: Fed. 136 in Apizaco

South segment
- Length: 33.22 km (20.64 mi)
- North end: Tlaxcala City
- South end: Fed. 150D in Puebla City

Location
- Country: Mexico

Highway system
- Mexican Federal Highways; List; Autopistas
| ← Fed. 117 | → Fed. 120 |

Federal Highway 119 (Carretera Federal 119) is a Federal Highway of Mexico. Federal Highway 119 is split into two segments: the first segment travels from Tejocotal, Hidalgo in the north to Apizaco, Tlaxcala in the south. The second segment travels from Tlaxcala City in the north to Puebla City in the south.
