= Mexican Federal Highway 93 =

Highway in Mexico

Federal Highway 93
- Carretera federal 93

Route information
- Maintained by Secretariat of Infrastructure, Communications and Transportation
- Length: 278 km (173 mi)

North segment
- North end: Fed. 190 south of Tehuixtla
- South end: Tulcingo, Puebla

South segment
- North end: Jilotepec, Guerrero
- South end: Fed. 95 in Chilpancingo

Location
- Country: Mexico

Highway system
- Mexican Federal Highways; List; Autopistas
← Fed. 90	→ Fed. 95

Federal Highway 93 (Carretera Federal 93) (Fed. 93) is a free (libre) part of the federal highways corridors (los corredores carreteros federales) of Mexico.

The highway has two separate improved segments that are maintained by the Secretaría de Comunicaciones y Transportes de Mexico. The first segment starts south of Tehuixtla, Puebla in the north to Tulcingo, Puebla to the south. The total segment length is 43 km (27 mi). Between Tulcingo de Valle and Jilotepec, Guerrero, the highway is maintained as Puebla (PUE) and Guerrero (GUE) state routes. The second segment starts in Jilotepec in the northeast to Chilpancingo in the southwest. The total segment length is 235 km (146 mi).
