= Mexican Federal Highway 121 =

Highway in Mexico

Federal Highway 121
- Carretera federal 121
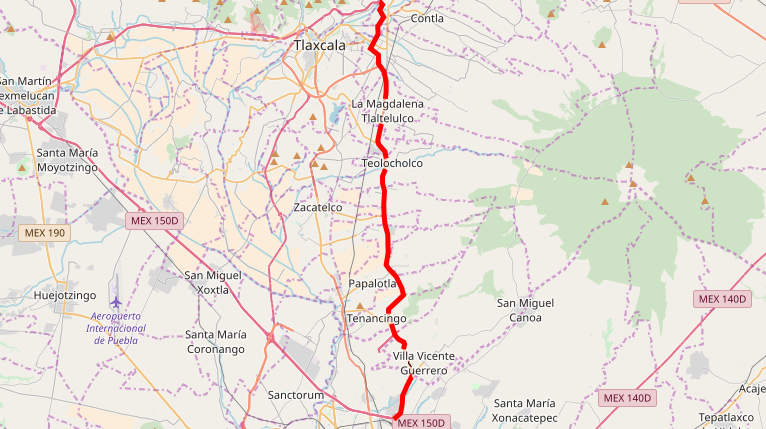

Route information
- Maintained by Secretariat of Infrastructure, Communications and Transportation
- Length: 34.9 km (21.7 mi)

Major junctions
- North end: Fed. 136 in Apizaco
- South end: Fed. 150D in Puebla City

Location
- Country: Mexico

Highway system
- Mexican Federal Highways; List; Autopistas
← Fed. 120	→ Fed. 123

Federal Highway 121 (Carretera Federal 121) is a Federal Highway of Mexico. The highway travels from Apizaco, Tlaxcala in the north to Puebla City, Puebla in the south.
