= Mexican Federal Highway 117 =

Highway in Mexico

Federal Highway 117
- Carretera federal 117
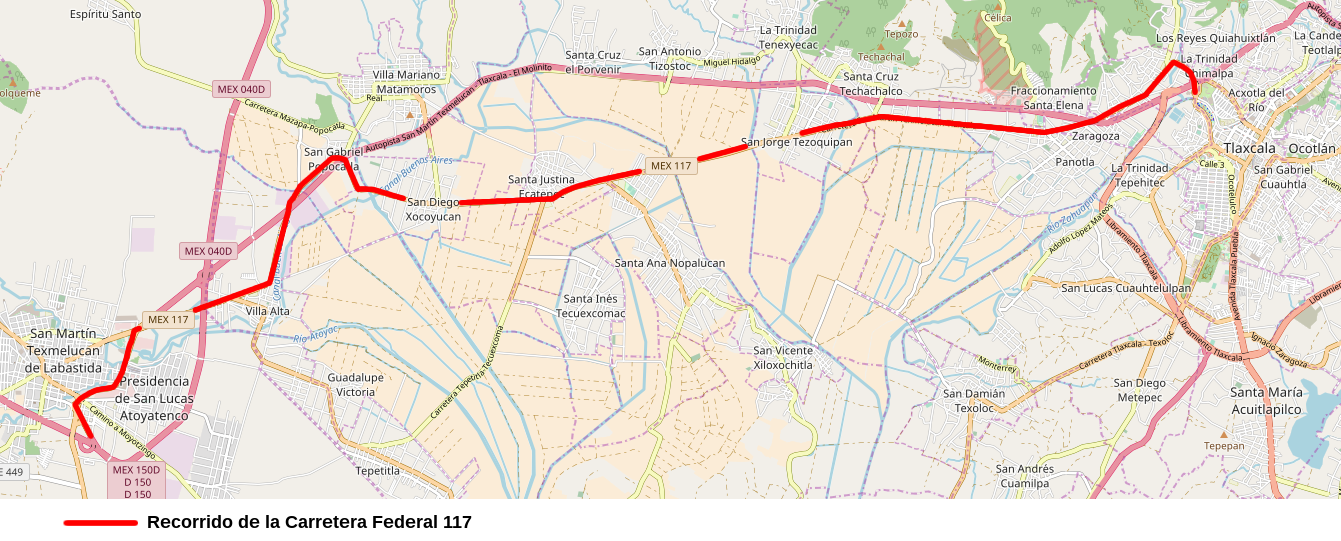

Route information
- Maintained by Secretariat of Infrastructure, Communications and Transportation
- Length: 24.81 km (15.42 mi)

Major junctions
- North end: Fed. 121 in Tlatempa
- South end: Fed. 150 in San Martín Texmelucan

Location
- Country: Mexico

Highway system
- Mexican Federal Highways; List; Autopistas
← Fed. 116	→ Fed. 119

Federal Highway 117 (Carretera Federal 117) is a Federal Highway of Mexico. The highway travels from Tlatempa, Tlaxcala in the north to San Martín Texmelucan, Puebla to the south.
