= Mexican Federal Highway 261 =

Highway in Mexico

Federal Highway 261
- Carretera federal 261

Route information
- Maintained by Secretariat of Infrastructure, Communications and Transportation

Location
- Country: Mexico

Highway system
- Mexican Federal Highways; List; Autopistas
← Fed. 259	→ Fed. 281

Federal Highway 261 (Carretera Federal 261) is a Federal Highway of Mexico. It connects Campeche City with Umán in Yucatán (230.83 kilometres (143.43 mi)) and Mérida with Progreso (35.04 kilometres (21.77 mi)); it also serves as a bypass of the latter city (6.5 kilometres (4.0 mi)).
