= Mexican Federal Highway 135 =

Highway in Mexico

Federal Highway 135
- Carretera federal 135

Route information
- Maintained by Secretariat of Infrastructure, Communications and Transportation
- Length: 202.7 km (126.0 mi)

Major junctions
- North end: Fed. 150 in Tehuacán
- South end: Fed. 190 in San Francisco Telixtlahuaca

Location
- Country: Mexico

Highway system
- Mexican Federal Highways; List; Autopistas
← Fed. 134	→ Fed. 136

Federal Highway 135 (Carretera Federal 135) is a Federal Highway of Mexico. The highway travels from Tehuacán, Puebla in the north to San Francisco Telixtlahuaca-San Pablo Huitzo, Oaxaca in the south.
