= Mexican Federal Highway 140 =

Highway in Mexico

Federal Highway 140
- Carretera federal 140

Route information
- Maintained by Secretariat of Infrastructure, Communications and Transportation
- Length: 265.57 km (165.02 mi)

Major junctions
- East end: Fed. 150D in Veracruz
- West end: Fed. 150 in Tepeaca

Location
- Country: Mexico

Highway system
- Mexican Federal Highways; List; Autopistas
← Fed. 138	→ Fed. 142

Federal Highway 140 (Carretera Federal 140) is a federal highway of Mexico. The highway travels from Veracruz, Veracruz, in the east to Tepeaca, Puebla, in the west.
