= Mexican Federal Highway 55 =

Highway in Mexico

Federal Highway 55
- Carretera federal 55

Route information
- Maintained by Secretariat of Infrastructure, Communications and Transportation
- Length: 256.82 km (159.58 mi)

Major junctions
- North end: Fed. 57 in Puerta de Palmillas
- South end: Fed. 95 in Axixintla

Location
- Country: Mexico

Highway system
- Mexican Federal Highways; List; Autopistas
← Fed. 54	→ Fed. 57

Federal Highway 55 (Carretera Federal 55) (Fed. 55) is a toll-free (libre) part of the federal highways corridors (los corredores carreteros federales) of Mexico. The highway connects Puerta de Palmillas, Querétaro to the north and Axixintla, Guerrero to the south.
