= Circuito Exterior Mexiquense =

Toll highways in Mexico

The Circuito Exterior Mexiquense literally, "Mexiquense Outer Loop", also known as the Vía Mexiquense' (Mexiquense way) or "Autopista mexiquense' (Mexiquense highway)" is a series of toll roads constructed between 2006 and 2011 by the State of Mexico government, providing an option for motorists to skirt the edge of Greater Mexico City when driving between areas in the State of Mexico to the northwest of Mexico City, northeast of Mexico City (e.g. Ecatepec) and east of Mexico City (e.g. Ciudad Nezahualcóyotl and Chalco). Portions carry the Mexican Federal Highway 57D designation, and others carry the State of Mexico State Highway 5D designation (sometimes with a federal shield).

Overview of the Circuito Exterior Mexiquense.

The road was built in four phases:

1. Continuation of the Chamapa-Lecheria highway to Tultepec, finished in 2008.
2. "Peñón Texcoco-Bordo de Xochiaca", inaugurated December 11, 2009, with a continuation at the Lago Nabor Carrillo junction with the Mexico City-Puebla Highway (Federal Highway 150).
3. "Vialidad Mexiquense", from Zumpango to Tultepec, intersecting with the Mexico City–Querétaro Highway (Federal Highway 57)

The section from the Mexico City-Puebla Highway to Nepantla, southeast of the metropolitan area, remains unbuilt as of 2014.
