= Juriquilla =

Affluent suburb in Querétaro, Mexico

Juriquilla Hacienda Juriquilla
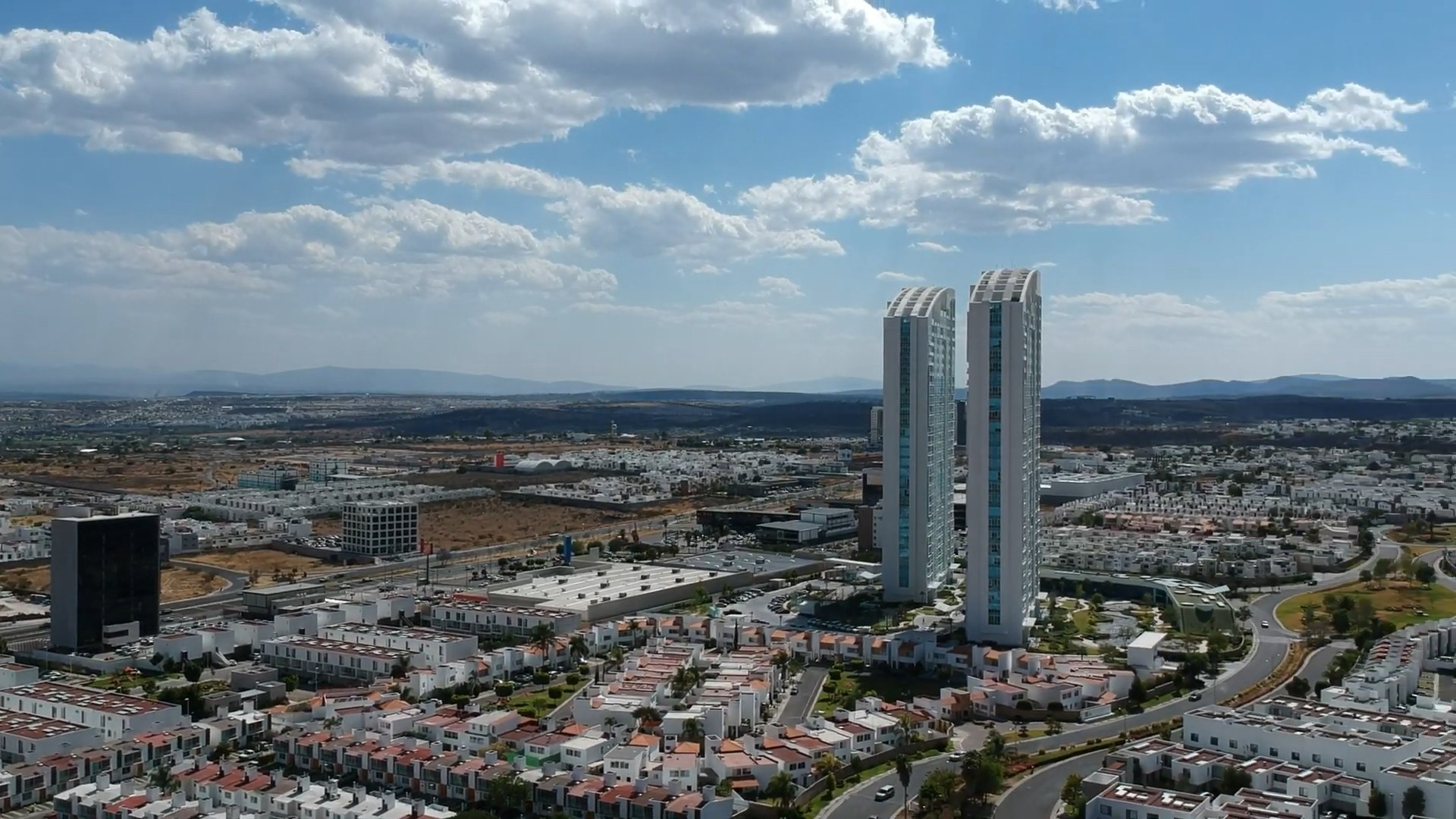

- Flag

- Location within Mexico
- Coordinates: 20°42′28″N 100°27′41″W
- Country: Mexico
- State: Querétaro
- Municipality: Santiago de Querétaro
- City: Juriquilla

Population (2020)
  - Total: 39,244
- Time zone: UTC-6 (CST)
- Postal Code: 76230
- Area Code: (442)

Juriquilla is an affluent suburb within the limits of Santiago de Querétaro, Querétaro, Mexico. It was founded as a hacienda in the 18th century and became a golf course and residential area in the 1970s. It is some 230 kilometres (140 mi) to the northwest of Mexico City and about 15 kilometres (9.3 mi) north of central Santiago de Querétaro.

The city is on the Querétaro-San Luis Potosí City road. The former hacienda has been converted into a hotel.

== History ==
The main building of the hacienda was built in 1707. By the end of the 18th century, the owner of the property was Pedro Antonio de Septién Montero y Austri, son of Agustín de Septién y Montero, from León, Guanajuato. Pedro Antonio moved from Guanajuato to Querétaro in his youth and became Alférez Real of the city for almost 37 years. He was also dean and mayor on many occasions. Pedro Antonio died in December 1814.

In the 19th century, the hacienda was bought by Timoteo Fernández de Jáuregui, who later sold it to Bernabé Loyola. This last one sold the property to Francisco Contreras and finally was bought by José Mario Romero, a wealthy businessman from nearby San Juan del Río.

The hacienda was finally transformed into a hotel in 1992.

== Features ==
- UNAM - Universidad Nacional Autónoma de México, Juriquilla Campus (Neurobiology Institute, LIPATA: Institute of Engineering, Geosciences Center, LIIGH: International Laboratory for Human Genome Research, and CFATA: Applied Physics and Advanced Technology Center).
- CINVESTAV - Centro de Investigación Avanzada del Instituto Politécnico Nacional.
- UAQ - Universidad Autónoma de Querétaro.
- UVM - Universidad del Valle de México, Campus Qro.
- Bullfighting ring, with a capacity of 4000.
- Plaza Náutica.

== Golf course ==
Juriquilla Golf Course is an 18-hole championship golf course of 72 par and a hotel.

Holes are flat 18-hole course, and the yardage is 6794-6192-4842, Designed by Larry Hughes in 1977, its facilities include a clubhouse, a restaurant, a bar, tuition, a pro-shop, and a driving range.

It also has a smaller 9-hole executive golf course of 9 par 3 holes.

== Real Estate ==
Juriquilla has always been known as a residential area. A ten-minute drive from downtown puts Juriquilla far enough to avoid the city common problems, such as traffic jams but close enough to enjoy all of the city's advantages. During the last decade, Juriquilla has slowly been recognized as an investment opportunity area, due to the prices of the land and the arrival of many people from Mexico City. However, Juriquilla's population has grown enough as to suffer from traffic problems when inhabitants leave their homes for their jobs, which are usually in Santiago de Querétaro or El Marqués, or when they return home.

== Gallery ==
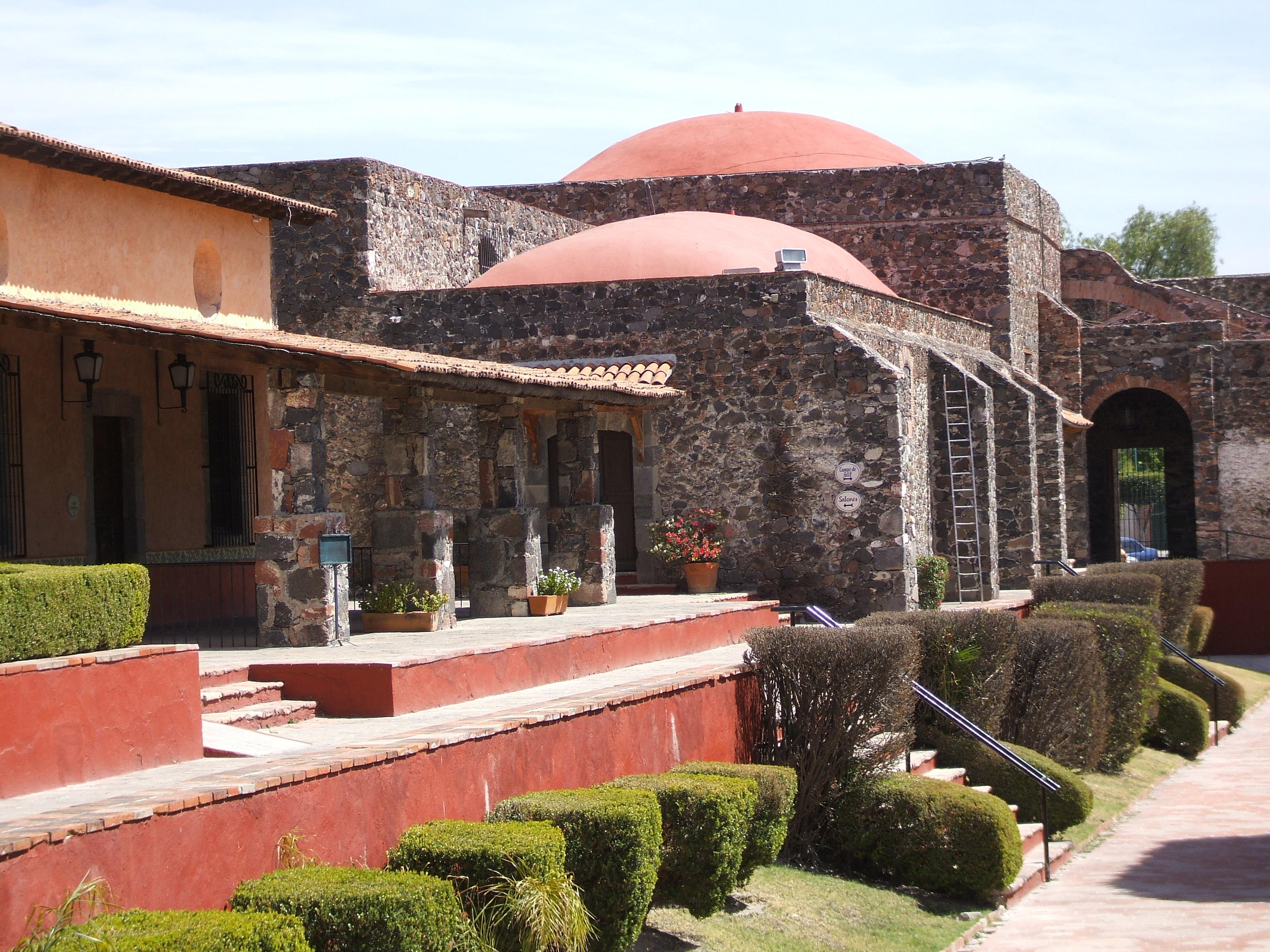

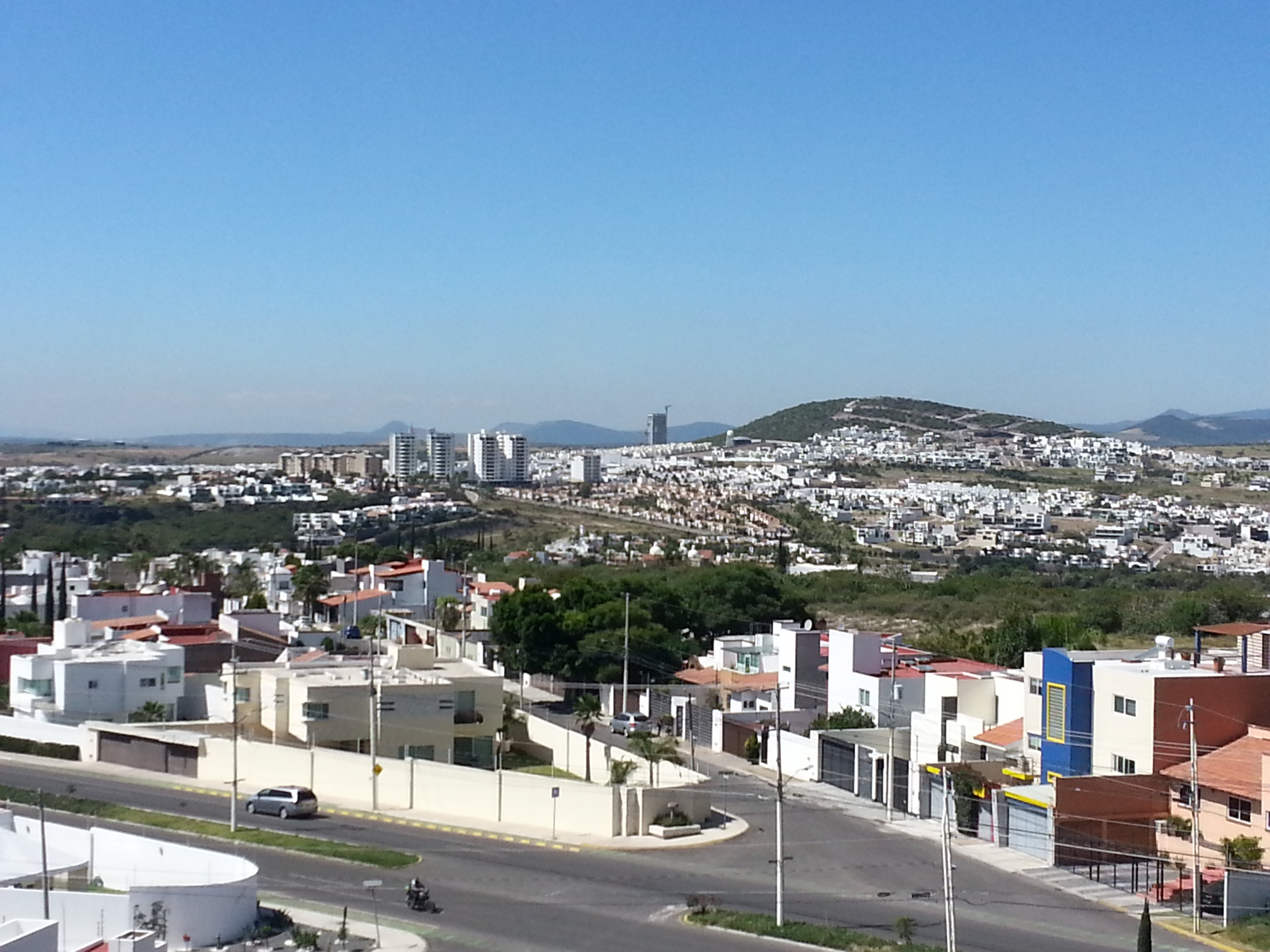

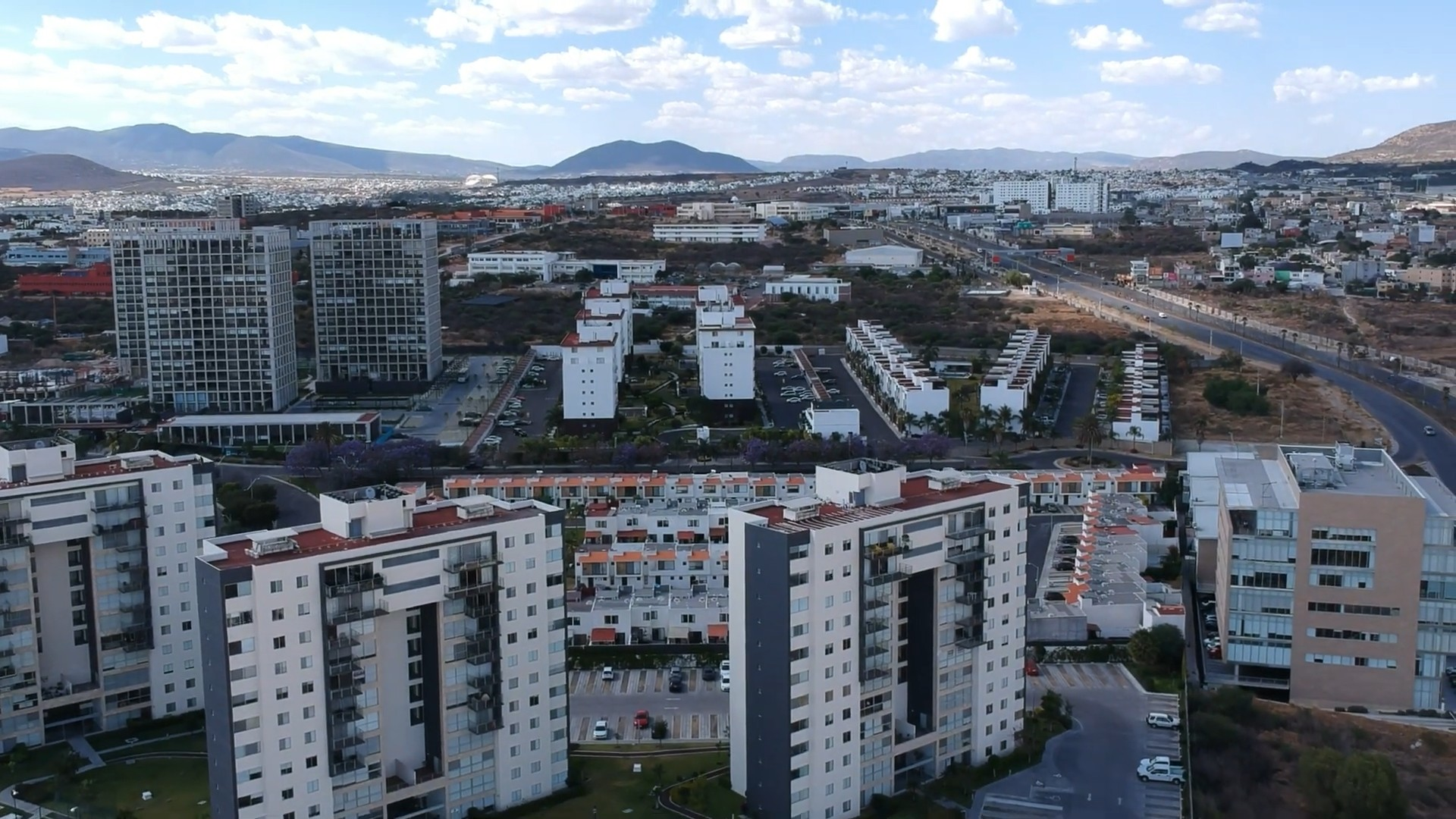

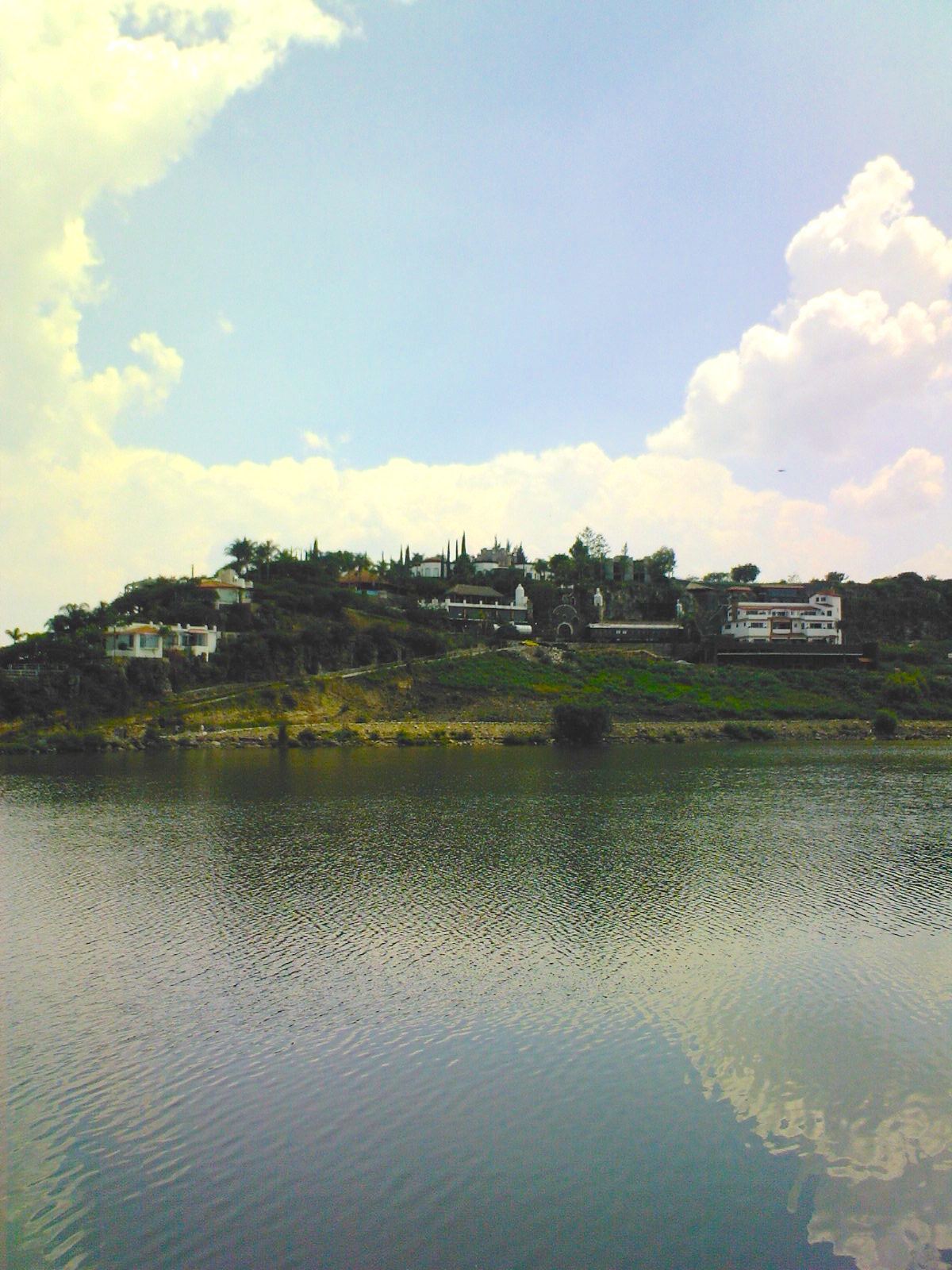

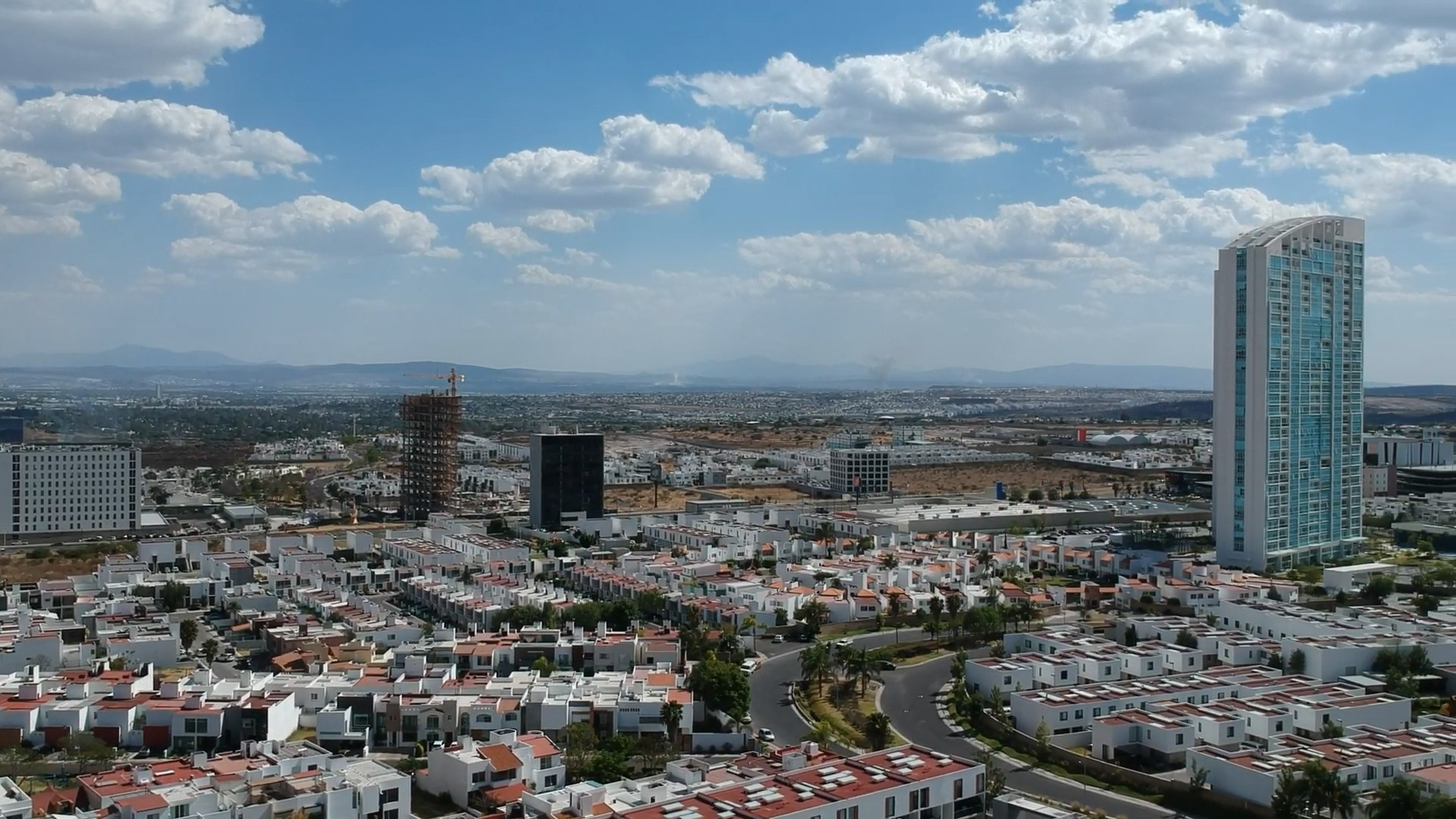

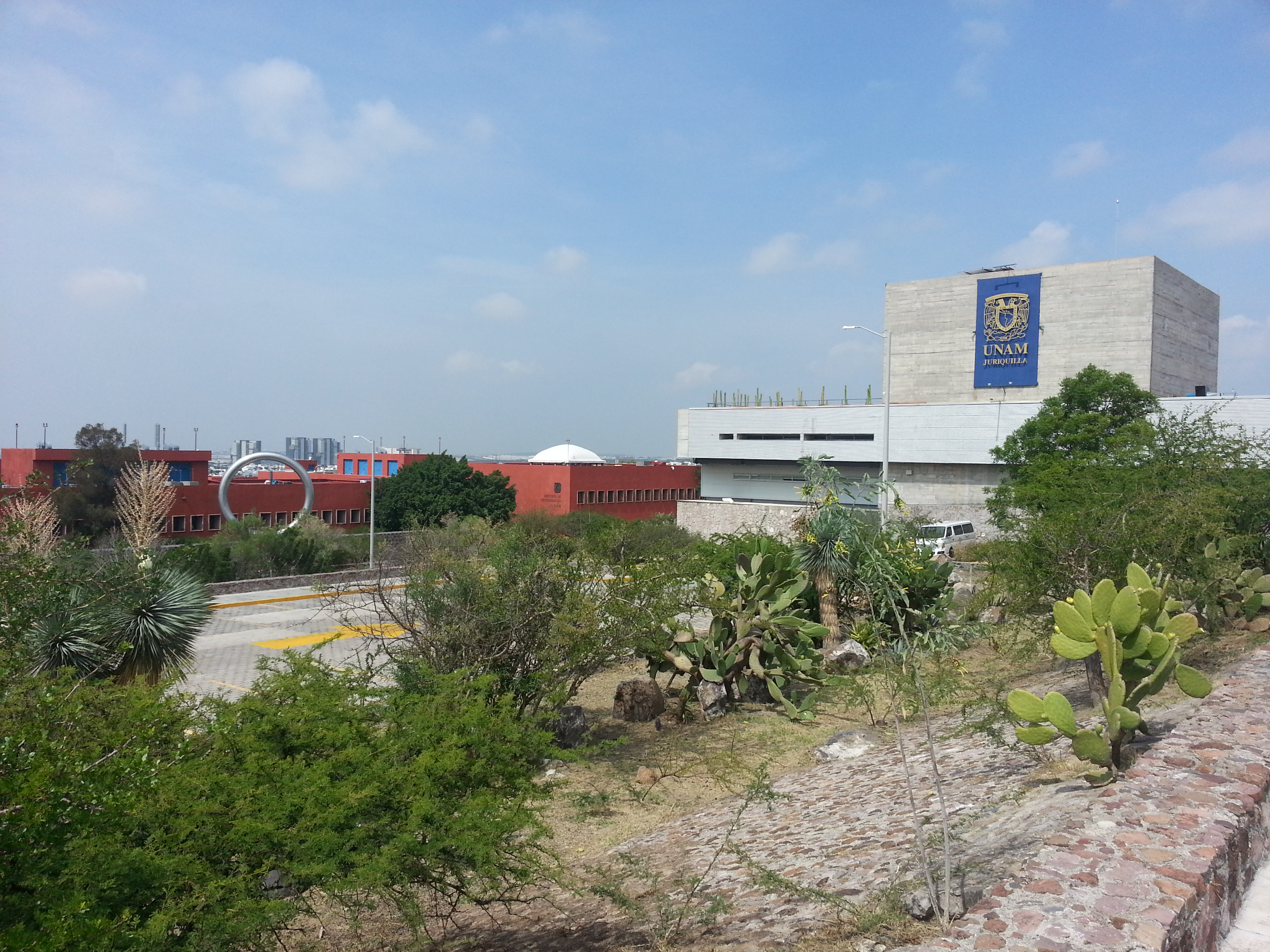
