= Mexican Federal Highway 120 =

Highway in Mexico

Federal Highway 120
- Carretera federal 120

Route information
- Maintained by Secretariat of Infrastructure, Communications and Transportation
- Length: 718.31 km (446.34 mi)

East segment
- Length: 450.41 km (279.87 mi)
- East end: Fed. 85 in Xilitla
- West end: Fed. 43 in San José

West segment
- Length: 267.9 km (166.5 mi)
- East end: Fed. 15 in Quiroga
- West end: Tepalcatepec

Location
- Country: Mexico

Highway system
- Mexican Federal Highways; List; Autopistas
← Fed. 119	→ Fed. 121

Federal Highway 120 (Carretera Federal 120) connects La Placita de Morelos, Michoacán, to Mexican Federal Highway 85 in San Luis Potosí. Federal Highway 120 is split into two segments: the first segment runs from Xilitla, San Luis Potosí in the north to San José, Michoacán in the south. The second segment travels from Quiroga, Michoacán in the north to Tepalcatepec in the south.
