= Santa Rosa Jáuregui =

Santa Rosa Jáuregui Santa Ronal
- Flag

- Location within Mexico
- Coordinates: 20°44′30.46″N 100°26′50.45″W
- Country: Mexico
- State: Querétaro
- Municipality: Santiago de Querétaro
- Borough: Santa Rosa Jáuregui

Government
  - Councilor: Pablo Jesús Luna Garfias

Area
  - City: 367.45 km^{2} (141.87 sq mi)
- Elevation: 1,950 m (6,400 ft)

Population (2005)
  - City: 86,376
  - Density: 235.07/km^{2} (608.8/sq mi)
  - Urban: 33,347
  - Rural: 53,029
- Time zone: UTC-6 (CST)
- Postal Code: 76220
- Area Code: (442)

Santa Rosa Jáuregui is one of seven boroughs of the municipality Santiago de Querétaro. It has 16,966 inhabitants, and is located at 1950 meters above sea level. The borough is the largest of the municipality of Querétaro in terms of surface, covering its northern half, though it is the smallest in terms of population. There are fifty three rural and urban settlements, besides the borough of Santa Rosa.

If Santa Rosa were a municipality, it would be ranked 4th in the state in terms of population (after Querétaro, San Juan del Río, and Corregidora) and 14th in terms of area. It is considered the cradle of "carnitas" (deep fried pork meat).

== Cityscape ==
Federal Highway 57 crosses the borough in a north - south direction, as well as the Federal Road 111, which leads to San Miguel de Allende. The southern third is the urban nucleus, where Santa Rosa and the suburb of Juriquilla are located, as well as the towns of Montenegro and La Solana. 39% of the population dwell here. This area has seen one of the most rapid growth rates in the state.

This area is close to the rest of the city of Querétaro, and the limits with the boroughs of Felix Osores and Epigmenio Gonzalez. Other than the presence of the Highway 57, the area benefits from the newly built Libramiento Sur - Poniente and Anillo Vial Junípero Serra, which allows faster transportation to the rest of the city of Querétaro.

Despite having half the population of Santa Rosa, Juriquilla is equal in land area and will expand in the future. The area is home to public amenities including a golf course and a five star hotel, a renowned bullfighting arena, a reservoir (Presa del Cajón), and four universities (campuses of the UNAM, CINVESTAV - IPN, UAQ and UVM). This makes the area one of the science clusters in the State.

New developments are being planned, notably the Omnicentro, which will include buildings by I.M. Pei. Department stores and a supermarket will also be built, attracting the middle class.

North of Juriquilla is Santa Rosa, and separated by a small hill and the small reservoir Presa de Dolores which became the Parque Bicentenario. This new park makes both settlements a cohesive urban area. Santa Rosa retains much of its rural village character, though most of its inhabitants have become blue collar workers in the city's industry. Thus, large housing projects are being developed.

Following the Highway 57 northwards, the Presa de Santa Catarina is the largest reservoir in the municipality, adjacent to Road 111, where the village of Buenavista is located. There have been multiple industrial parks built along the highway, notably the Parque Industrial Querétaro, where companies such as Samsung are located. This area is projected to have an intensive industrial growth.

The western part of the borough is hilly terrain that forms the limits with the State of Guanajuato. Nature has been preserved in the area, mainly through conservation areas such as the park of Joya - La Barreta.

== History ==
The area is a perfect place for agricultural activities, and thus is home to four ancient haciendas, namely Juriquilla, La Solana, San Isidro and Santa María del Retablo.

The village of Santa Rosa has its origins in the 17th century, when the first settlers paid rent for fifty years to the owner of the Hacienda of La Solana in order to occupy a small tract of land.

On October 8, 1820, the regidor of Santa Rosa, Captain Antonio Ramón de Güemes, called elections to choose the 17 electors of the members of the first "Ayuntamiento", according to the Constitution of Cadiz. They were held on October 22, 1820, when the village had a population between seven and eight thousand people. On December 24, 1821 the second Ayuntamiento is elected, and on May 5, 1822, the mayor recognizes the independence of Mexico. The Constitutions of 1825, 1869 and 1879 recognize the settlement as a municipality.

In June 1871, the Ayuntamiento asks Ignacio Timoteo Fernández de Jáuregui, owner of the Hacienda of Juriquilla, to sell some land to the municipality, but instead he decided to donate. This enabled the proper foundation of the village, and engineer Mariano Reyes drew the plans of the streets and squares of the new settlement. Hence, in September of that year, the surname of Jáuregui is added to the name of Santa Rosa.

On January 7, 1914, Governor Teodoro Elizondo decrees that Querétaro shall be divided in 18 municipalities, and Santa Rosa becomes a borough of Querétaro. This would be ratified on August 31, 1916, by Governor Federico Montes. However, Governor Ramón Anaya signed Law 51 on May 20, 1931, that gave the status of municipality back to Santa Rosa. This law would be derogated on January 7, 1932 by Governor Saturnino Osornio, and this is the first official document where the village is referred to as "de Jáuregui".

The church of Santa Rosa de Lima was concluded during the Porfiriato, and the village remained a calm place, up to the development of the Provincia Juriquilla project.

== Settlements ==
Boroughs/Delegaciones

Santa Rosa - Juriquilla Urban Nucleus

The southern end of the borough, 17 km north of the city of Querétaro, is considered its urban nucleus. Santa Rosa, and the smaller villages of Montenegro and La Solana on the east form the core of this area, together with the suburb of Juriquilla. This area will see rapid growth in the coming years.

- Acequia Blanca (463)
- Juriquilla (8,362)
- La Solana (3,500)
- Montenegro (3,602)
- Nuevo Juriquilla (541)
- Real de Juriquila (175)
- Santa Rosa Jáuregui (16,966)

Rural Communities

There are 53 settlements in the borough, some of which are:

- Buenavista (3,935)
- Casa Blanca (819)
- Cerro Colorado (400)
- Cerro de la Cruz (913)
- Charape de los Pelones (248)
- Charape de la Joya (101)
- Corea (792)
- El Herrero (76)
- El Madroño
- El Rincón
- El Saucito
- El Salto
- El Tajo
- Estancia de la Rochera (594)
- Jofre (685)
- Jofrito (1,635)
- La Barreta (1,102)
- La Cañada
- La Carbonera (529)
- La Estacada (1,762)
- La Estancia de Palo Dulce (131)
- La Gotera (3,196)
- La Huerta
- La Joya (191)
- La Luz (1,418)
- La Monja (981)
- La Palma (550)
- La Puerta de Santiaguillo (29)
- La Tinaja de la Estancia (570)
- La Versolilla (1,713)
- Las Piletas
- Llano de la Rochera (120)
- Loma del Chino (354)
- Ojo de Agua (632)
- Palo Alto (1,246)
- Pie de Gallo (3,581)
- Pintillo (868)
- Pinto (1,155)
- Presa de Becerra (381)
- Presita de San Antonio (41)
- Puerto de Aguirre (2,263)
- Rancho Largo (495)
- Rincón de Ojo de Agua
- San Isidro Buenavista (1,349)
- San Isidro el Viejo (211)
- San José Buenavista (1,262)
- San Miguelito (2,560)
- Santa Catarina (1,673)
- Tinajitas
