= Autopista Chamapa–La Venta =

Mexican toll road

The Autopista Chamapa–La Venta is a toll road in Greater Mexico City. It, together with the Autopista Chamapa-Lechería is a single through route serving as a partial ring road (beltway) on the west side of the megalopolis. It connects:

- the northern edge of the metropolitan area at Cuautitlán at the junction with the Mexico City-Querétaro and Circuito Exterior Mexiquense toll roads at Lechería, and runs 27 km to Chamapa
- from which the 14.2 kilometres (8.8 mi) Autopista Chamapa–La Venta continues to the western edge of the metro area at La Venta, west of the major business district of Santa Fe

The route runs through the municipalities of Naucalpan, Huixquilucan and the Mexico City borough of Cuajimalpa. The road passes west of important new wealthy residential, retail and business district of Interlomas.

PINFRA was awarded the concession in 1992 for Chamapa-La Venta and 1994 for Chamapa-Lechería.'

The Chamapa-La Venta concession is to Concesionaria de Vías Troncales, S.A. de C.V. and it is operated by Promotora del Desarrollo de América Latina, S.A. de C.V., part of Impulsora del Desarrollo y el Empleo en America Latina SAB de CV (IDEAL), part of the Carlos Slim empire.
