= Mexican Federal Highway 57D =

Toll highway in Mexico

Federal Highway 57D
- Carretera federal 57D

Route information
- Maintained by Secretariat of Communications and Transportation

Location
- Country: Mexico

Highway system
- Mexican Federal Highways; List; Autopistas

Federal Highway 57D (Carretera Federal 57D) (Fed. 57D) is a tolled (cuota) part of the federal highways corridor of the paralleling Fed. 57. Eight separate tolled segments exist of Fed. 57D between Mexico City and Allende, Coahuila; a ninth is part-federal and part-state.

== Roads in the Mexico City area ==
=== Chamapa-Lechería ===
Autopista Chamapa-Lechería
- Location: Autopista Chamapa-La Venta at Chamapa to Fed. 57D (México-Querétaro) at Lechería
- Length: 27.346 km (16.992 mi)

The Autopista Chamapa-Lechería entered service in 1994. It costs 44 pesos to travel and is operated by Caminos y Puentes Federales. Combined with the Autopista Chamapa-La Venta, not part of the federal highways corridors, this highway rings the northwest and western portion of the Mexico City area.

=== Circuito Exterior Mexiquense ===
Sections of the Circuito Exterior Mexiquense, a ring road located entirely in the State of Mexico, are also designated Fed. 57D, while others are in the state highway system of the state governments of Mexico and are designated Mex 5D.

== Mexico City-Querétaro ==
Autopista México-Querétaro
- Location: Autopista Chamapa-Lechería and Periférico Ávila Camacho in Mexico City to Fed. 57 at Palmillas, Querétaro (to Querétaro City)
- Length: 211.6 km (131.5 mi)

The highway between Mexico City and Querétaro is one of the oldest components of the Mexican toll road network, being the third toll highway to open in the country. It was built by Caminos Federales de Ingresos, S.A. de C.V., a state-owned predecessor to Caminos y Puentes Federales (CAPUFE), and reduced travel times between Mexico City and cities in central and northern Mexico. The road also crosses through a portion of the state of Hidalgo, including the city of Tepeji del Río.

Not all of the road to Querétaro is tolled, but traffic is tolled on the 145.8 kilometres (90.6 mi) between Mexico City and Palmillas, for a toll of 148 pesos (for cars) over two toll booths.

== Bypasses of San Luis Potosí ==
=== Libramiento Oriente ===
Libramiento Oriente de San Luis Potosí
- Location: Fed. 57 north of San Luis Potosí to Fed. 57 north of Matehuala
- Length: 33.76 km (20.98 mi)

The two bypasses of San Luis Potosí City are identified as Fed. 57D. The Libramiento Oriente de San Luis Potosí, serving the north-south cargo traffic and also allowing traffic to access Fed. 70 to Tampico, opened on August 23, 1991. It is operated by META (Mexicana de Técnicos en Autopistas) and carries a toll of 59 pesos for cars.

=== Libramiento Norponiente/Poniente ===
Libramiento Norponiente de San Luis Potosí
- Location: Fed. 57D south of Matehuala to Fed. 80 southwest of San Luis Potosí
- Length: 53.9 km (33.5 mi)

When the Libramiento Norponiente de San Luis Potosí opened in 2014, it initially was 31.5 kilometres (19.6 mi) in length and ran from the Libramiento Oriente to Fed. 49 to Zacatecas. An extension, the Western Bypass, to Fed. 80 was formally inaugurated by President Enrique Peña Nieto on February 27, 2017. The segment from Fed. 57D to Fed. 45 carries a toll of 56 pesos for cars, while the segment to Fed. 80 carries a toll of 49 pesos for cars. Both segments are maintained by META.

== Libramiento de Matehuala ==
Libramiento de Matehuala
- Location: Fed. 57 south of Matehuala to Fed. 57 north of Matehuala
- Length: 14.2 km (8.8 mi)

The 21-kilometre (13 mi) Libramiento de Matehuala opened on November 13, 2004. It is operated by OCACSA with a toll of 24 pesos for cars.

== Puerto México-La Carbonera and Libramiento Oriente de Saltillo ==
Autopista Puerto México-La Carbonera Libramiento Oriente de Saltillo
- Location: Fed. 57 in Puerto México, Nuevo León to Fed. 40 to Fed. 40D / Fed. 57 north of Saltillo
- Length: 54 km (34 mi)

The 21-kilometre (13 mi) Libramiento Oriente de Saltillo entered service on December 12, 1992, followed by its 32-kilometre (20 mi) southern extension to Fed. 57D near Puerto México, on the Nuevo León side of the state line, on May 1, 1994. Both roads are operated by Caminos y Puentes Federales and carry tolls of 36 and 56 pesos, respectively.

== Nueva Rosita-Allende ==
Carretera Premier Carretera Nueva Rosita-Allende
- Location: Fed. 57 / Fed. 57 in Nueva Rosita to Fed. 90 in Allende
- Length: 54 km (34 mi)

Placed on the federal highways corridors in 2017, the Carretera Premier bypasses Fed. 57 from Nueva Rosita to Ciudad Allende in northern Coahuila. It is operated by Súper Carreteras del Norte, whose principal is known to be former governor Rogelio Montemayor Seguy, with a toll of 96 pesos for cars.

Criticism around the highway has abounded, particularly over its poor condition. Northbound travelers do not benefit from the highway's insurance policy, as they do not have toll tickets obtained at the toll booth at the northern terminus. State deputy Carolina Morales Iribarren said, "Incredibly, the free highway, 57, is in better shape." Motorists have also complained over the lack of emergency services.
