= Mexican Federal Highway 136 =

Highway in Mexico

Federal Highway 136
- Carretera federal 136
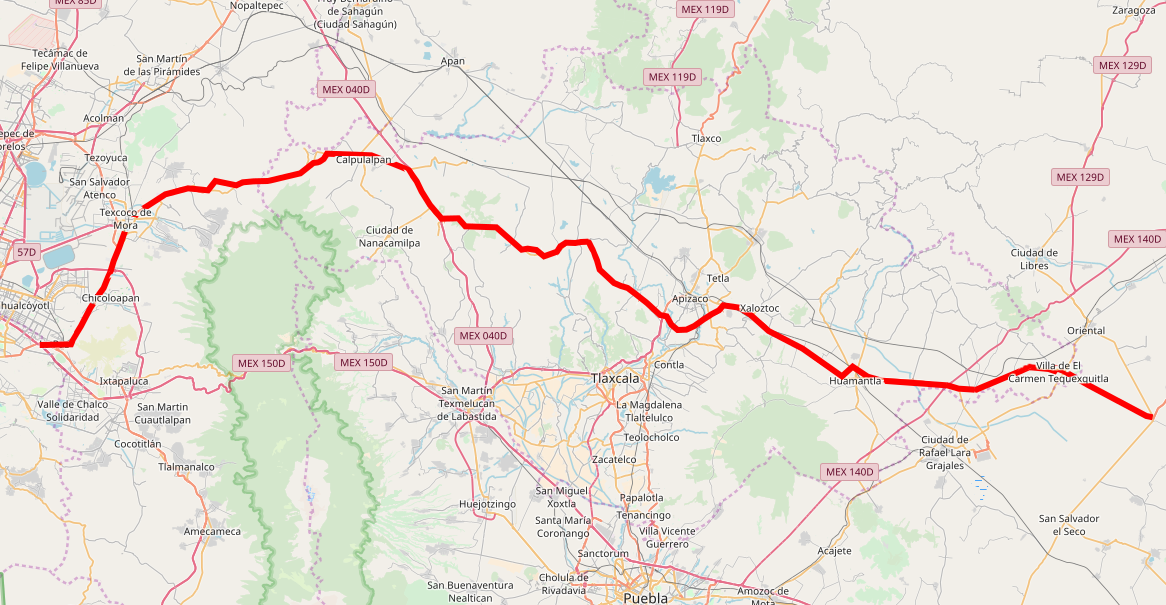

Route information
- Maintained by Secretariat of Infrastructure, Communications and Transportation
- Length: 187.67 km (116.61 mi)

Major junctions
- East end: Fed. 140 in Zacatepec
- West end: Fed. 150 in Los Reyes Acaquilpan

Location
- Country: Mexico

Highway system
- Mexican Federal Highways; List; Autopistas
| ← Fed. 135 | → Fed. 138 |

Federal Highway 136 (Carretera Federal 136) is a Federal Highway of Mexico. The highway travels from Zacatepec, Puebla in the east to Los Reyes Acaquilpan, State of Mexico in the west.
