= San Bernardino, Texcoco =

Human settlement in Mexico

Coordinates: 19°27′N 98°54′W

San Bernardino
- Village
- Interactive map of San Bernardino
- Country: Mexico
- State: Mexico
- Municipality: Texcoco

Population (2018)
  - Total: 5,667

San Bernardino is a village in Texcoco, State of Mexico, Mexico.
