= Tepexpan =

City in the State of Mexico, Mexico

Coordinates: 19°37′09″N 98°56′07″W

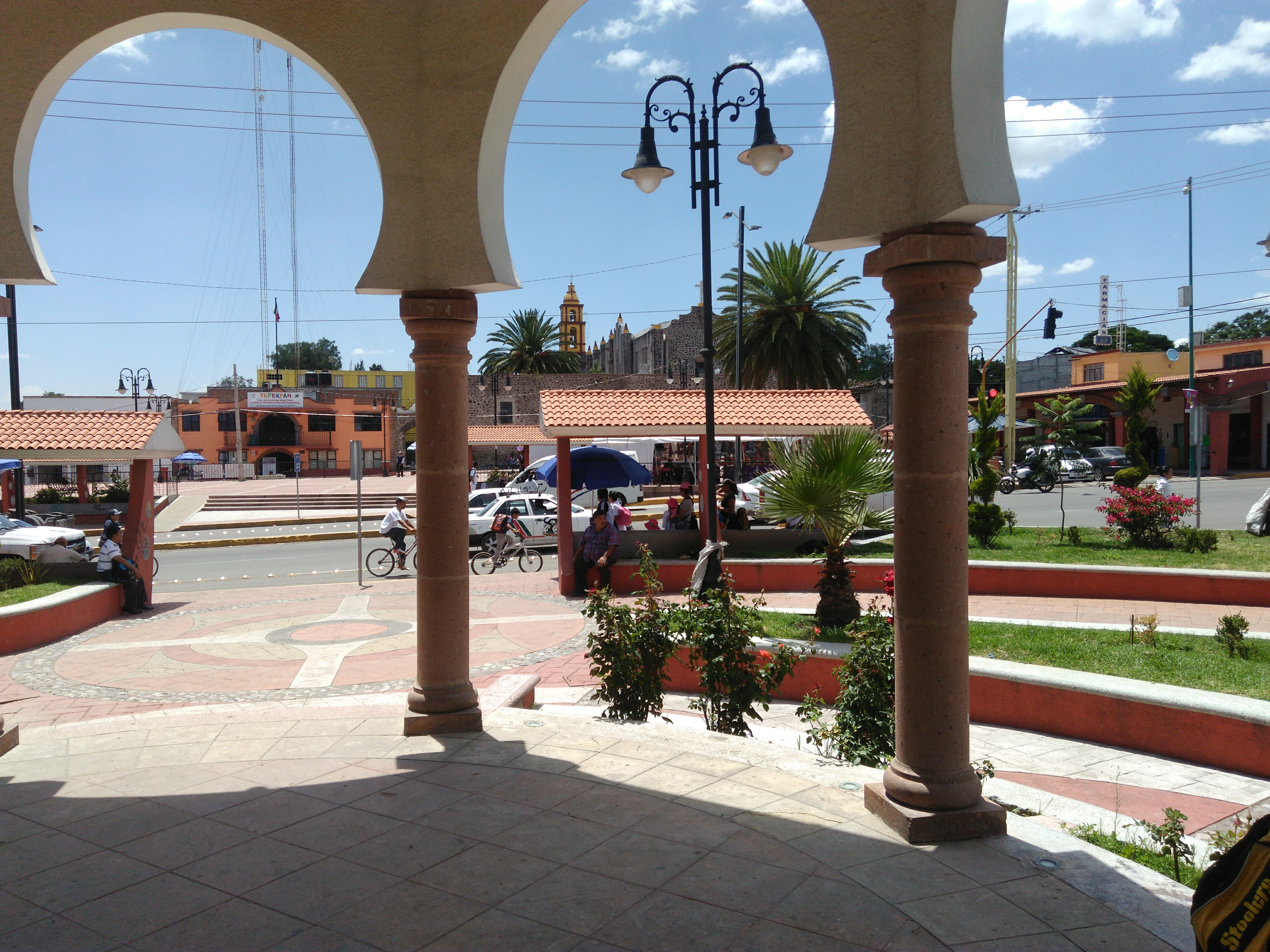

Tepexpan is the largest town in the Acolman municipality in the State of Mexico, Mexico. The population is 102,667.

One of the most interesting aspects of this town is the discovery of an early Mesoamerican skeleton commonly referred to as "Tepexpan man". Recent research tries to show that the skeleton was not that of a man but that of a woman. The woman was apparently trampled by a raging mastodon around 11,000 BCE. The proposition that Tepexpan Man was a woman has been advanced by one Mexican archaeologist based on DNA analysis. His peers at INAH have not accepted his conclusions and he has not submitted his analysis in a paper for peer review. Thus, until peer review confirms his work one must leave the matter as conjecture. Additional mammoth fossils from the Late Pleistocene show this site the nearby Santa Isabel Ixtapanto be mammoth kill sites. Mammoths were driven into bogs where they were severely slowed and eventually killed with fluted points as early as 9000 BCE or as late as 7000 BCE.

Tepexpan can be considered one of the most important towns in the municipal region of Acolman. It has many resources, among these: obsidian and pewter.

Tepexpan has a church named Santa Maria Magdalena, located near the central plaza. It is one oldest of the region and it was built near the first years of the Spanish conquest.

It has five districts:

Anahuac 1 Sección ( Tepexpan )

Anahuac II Sección ( Tepexpan )

Chimalpa ( Tepexpan )

Los Reyes ( Tepexpan )

Paraje El Faro

== See also ==
- List of fossil sites (with link directory)
- List of hominina (hominid) fossils (with images)
