= Mexican Federal Highway 57 =

Highway in Mexico

Federal Highway 57
- Carretera federal 57

Route information
- Maintained by Secretariat of Infrastructure, Communications and Transportation
- Length: 1,301.83 km (808.92 mi)

Major junctions
- North end: US 57 at the U.S. border in Piedras Negras
- Fed. 2 in Piedras Negras; Fed. 53 in Nueva Rosita; Fed. 30 in Monclova; Fed. 53 near Castaños; Fed. 40 / Fed. 54 in Saltillo; Fed. 70 / Fed. 80 in San Luis Potosí; Fed. 45 / Fed. 57D in Querétaro, Qro. (Mexico-Querétaro); Fed. 120 near San Juan del Río; Fed. 45 in Puerta de Palmillas; Fed. 55 south of Puerta de Palmillas
- South end: Mexico City

Location
- Country: Mexico

Highway system
- Mexican Federal Highways; List; Autopistas
← Fed. 55	→ Fed. 58

Federal Highway 57 (Carretera Federal 57) (Fed. 57) is a free (libre) part of the federal highways corridors (los corredores carreteros federales) of Mexico.

The 1301.83 km (808.92 mi) highway connects Mexico City with Piedras Negras, Coahuila. This road links many major highways in the country, forming the backbone of the road network in Mexico. In the eastern Mexican Plateau, (the western foothills of Sierra Madre Oriental), Fed. 57 connects points in the north including Monclova to San Luis Potosí in the south. The road passes through the following states and cities:

== Coahuila ==
- Saltillo
- Ramos Arizpe
- Castaños
- Monclova
- Frontera
- Sabinas
- Allende
- Nava
- Piedras Negras

== Nuevo León ==
- San Roberto
- San Rafael

== San Luis Potosí ==
- Santa María del Río
- San Luis Potosí
- Villa Hidalgo
- Matehuala

== Guanajuato ==
- San Luis de la Paz

== Querétaro ==
- San Juan del Río
- Pedro Escobedo
- Santiago de Querétaro

== State of Mexico ==
- San Francisco Soyaniquilpan
- Polotitlán

== Hidalgo ==
- Tepeji de Ocampo

== State of Mexico ==
- Cuautitlán
- Tepotzotlán
- Coyotepec

== Federal District ==
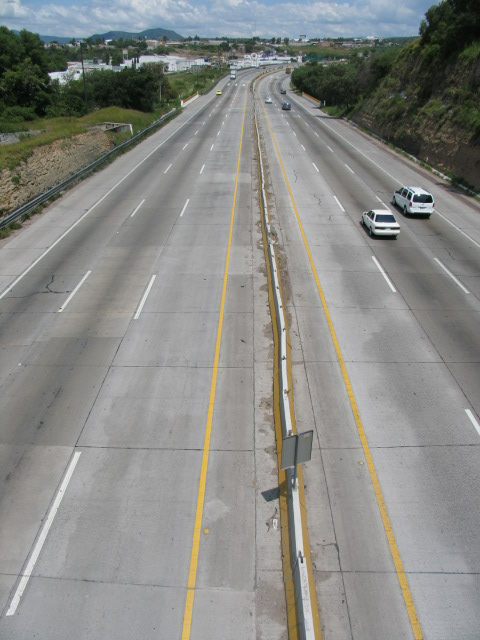

- Mexico City

Note: As Fed. 57-D, Autopista Chamapa-La Venta skirts the western edge of Greater Mexico City through the State of Mexico and the western Federal District.
