= Muna, Yucatán =

Town in Yucatan, Mexico

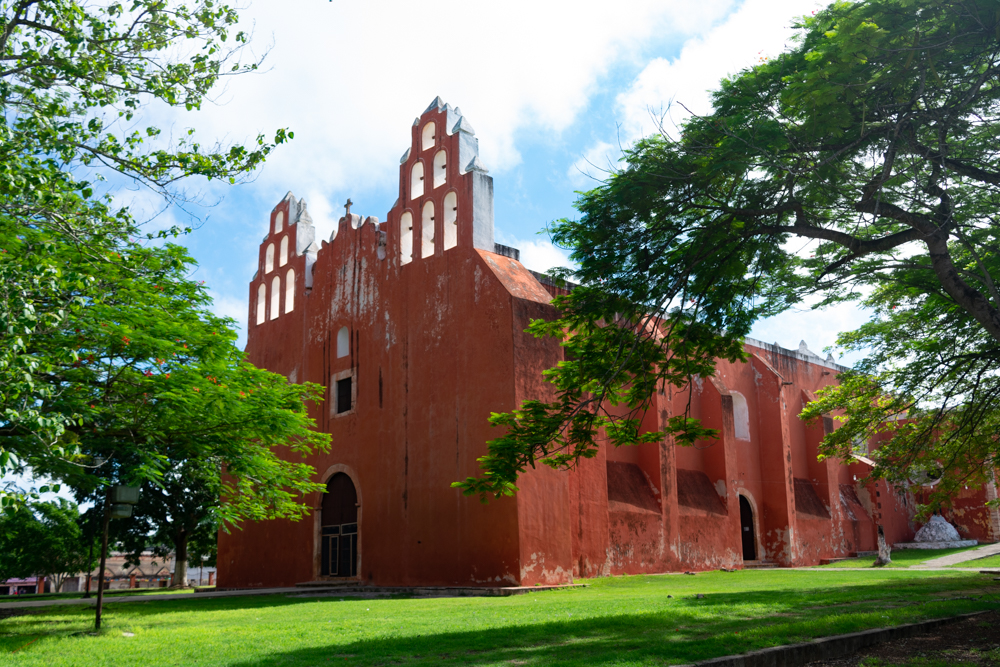
Church in Muna

Muná is a small city in Muna Municipality, Yucatán State, Mexico, to the south of the state capital of Mérida at 20.48°N, 89.72°W. Muná had an estimated population of about 11,000 people in 2003, and about 12,000 people in 2023. Muna is north of the Maya ruins of Uxmal.

The Iglesia De Muna church dates to the 16th century, and is dedicated to the Assumption of Mary.

Muna's Carnival is celebrated throughout town in August and April. During the celebration dances, bullfights, and many festivities are held.
