= List of Mexican Federal Highways =

This is a list of numbered federal highways (carreteras federales) in Mexico. Federal Highways from north to south are assigned odd numbers; highways from west to east are assigned even numbers. The numbering scheme starts in the northwest of the country (in Tijuana, Baja California). The highest designation, Mexican Federal Highway 307, is assigned to roads hugging the coast of Quintana Roo and the international border in Chiapas. This list identifies the road starting point at the north or the west point of the highway and terminus at its eastern or southern point.

Motorways and roads with restricted access are considered part of the Federal Highways network and follow the same numbering schema. The letter "D" (for Directo) is added to the road number for all toll roads. For information on toll roads, see List of Mexican autopistas.

== List of highways ==
Number	Length (km)	Length (mi)	Southern or western terminus	Northern or eastern terminus	Formed	Removed	Notes
Fed. 1	1711	1,063	Cabo San Lucas, BCS	Tijuana, BC	—	—	
Fed. 2	1969.69	1,223.91	Tijuana, BC Ciudad Acuña, Coah.	El Porvenir, Chih. Playa Bagdad, Tamps.	—	—	
Fed. 3	300.53	186.74	Tecate, BC	El Chinero, BC	—	—	
Fed. 5	402.6	250.2	Mexicali, BC	Laguna Chapala, BC	—	—	
Fed. 8	103.7	64.4	Puerto Peñasco, Son.	Sonoyta, Son.	—	—	
Fed. 9	37	23	Cadereyta, NL	Allende, NL	—	—	
Fed. 10	257	160	Janos, Chih.	El Sueco, Chih.	—	—	
Fed. 11	17	11	Pichilingue, BCS	La Paz, BCS	—	—	
Fed. 12	68	42	Parador Punta Prieta, BC	Bahía de los Ángeles	—	—	Signed as Federal Highway 1
Fed. 14	212.5	132.0	Hermosillo, Son.	Moctzeuma, Son.	—	—	
Fed. 14	113.3	70.4	Uruapan, Mich.	Morelia, Mich.	—	—	
Fed. 15	2363.51	1,468.62	Nogales, Son.	Mexico City	—	—	
Fed. 16	878.4	545.8	Hermosillo, Son.	Ojinaga, Chih.	—	—	
Fed. 17	197.6	122.8	Agua Prieta, Son.	Moctezuma, Son.	—	—	
Fed. 19	131	81	San Pedro, BCS	Cabo San Lucas, BCS	—	—	
Fed. 22	36	22	Rincón de Romos, Ags.	Ciénega Grande, Ags.	—	—	Legally Highway 39 but signed as 22
Fed. 23	1290.0	801.6	Guanacevi, Dgo.	Chapala, Jal.	—	—	
Fed. 24	482.4	299.7	Pericos, Sin. Guadalupe y Calvo, Chih.	Los Naranjos, Sin. Nuevo Palomas, Chih.	—	—	
Fed. 25	56	35	Ent. Rivier, Ags.	San Marcos, Zac.	—	—	Legally Mexican Federal Highway 66
Fed. 29	104	65	Morelos, Coah.	Ciudad Acuña, Coah.	—	—	
Fed. 30	542	337	El Palmito, Dgo.	Monclova, Coah.	—	—	
Fed. 34	98	61	Pedriceña, Dgo.	Ent. Rodeo, Dgo.	—	—	
Fed. 35	79	49	Santa Rosa, Jal.	La Barca, Jal.	—	—	
Fed. 35	43.3	26.9	Zamora, Mich.	Vista Hermosa, Mich.	—	—	
Fed. 35	93	58	Montemorelos, NL	China, NL	—	—	
Fed. 36	229	142	Ent. Los Herrera, Dgo.	Topia, Dgo.	—	—	
Fed. 37	117	73	Villa de Zaragoza, SLP	San Felipe, Gto.	—	—	
Fed. 37	413	257	Manuel Doblado, Gto.	Playa Azul, Mich.	—	—	
Fed. 40	1145.4	711.7	Villa Unión, Sin.	Reynosa, Tamps.	—	—	
Fed. 41	67	42	Irapuato, Gto.	Munguía, Gto.	—	—	
Fed. 43	107.95	67.08	Morelia, Mich.	Salamanca, Gto.	—	—	
Fed. 44	437.0	271.5	Fresnillo Zac.	Jocotepec Jal.	—	—	
Fed. 45	1491.73	926.92	Ciudad Juárez, Chih.	Portezuelo, Hgo.	—	—	
Fed. 49	526.7	327.3	Ciudad Jiménez, Chih.	Fresnillo, Zac.	—	—	
Fed. 49	162.98	101.27	Las Arcinas, Zac.	San Luis Potosí, SLP	—	—	
Fed. 51	309.41	192.26	Ojuelos de Jalisco, Jal.	Maravatío, Mich.	—	—	
Fed. 51	399.05	247.96	Zitácuaro, Mich.	Iguala, Gro.	—	—	
Fed. 53	521.61	324.11	Apodaca, NL	Boquillas del Carmen, Coah.	—	—	
Fed. 54	984.64	611.83	Ciudad Mier, Tamps.	Colima, Col.	—	—	
Fed. 55	256.82	159.58	Palmillas, Qro.	Axixintla, Gro.	—	—	
Fed. 57	1301.83	808.92	Piedras Negras, Coah.	Mexico City	—	—	
Fed. 58	98	61	San Roberto Junction, NL	Linares, NL	—	—	
Fed. 61	39	24	Acámbaro, Gto.	Maravatío, Mich.	—	—	
Fed. 62	118.23	73.46	San Tiburcio, Zac.	Matehuala, SLP	—	—	
Fed. 63	169.9	105.6	La Bonita, SLP	Mexquitic, SLP	—	—	
Fed. 68	36.00	22.37	Acaponeta Nay.	Novillero Nay.	—	—	
Fed. 69	105.43	65.51	Rioverde, SLP	Jalpan de Serra, Qro.	—	—	
Fed. 70	963.58	598.74	Mascota, Jal.	Tampico, Tamps.	—	—	
Fed. 71	81.5	50.6	Luis Moya, Ags. San Felipe, Ags.	Providencia, Ags. Villa Hidalgo, Jal.	—	—	
Fed. 72	42.00	26.10	Bocas de Camichin, Nay.	Santiago Ixcuintla, Nay.	—	—	
Fed. 74	36.00	22.37	San Blas, Nay.	Crucero de San Blas, Nay.	—	—	
Fed. 76	77.42	48.11	Tepic, Nay.	San Blas, Nay.	—	—	
Fed. 80	962.23	597.90	Tampico, Tamps.	San Patricio, Jal.	—	—	
Fed. 81	89	55	Llera de Canales, Tamps.	González, Tamps.	—	—	
Fed. 83	94.3	58.6	Ciudad Victoria, Tamps.	Ignacio Zaragoza, Tamps.	—	—	
Fed. 84	89	55	Zapote de Adjuntas, Gto.	San José de Bazarte, Jal.	—	—	
Fed. 85	1213	754	Mexico City	Nuevo Laredo	—	—	
Fed. 87	37.7	23.4	Tula, Hgo.	Jorobas, Mex.	—	—	
Fed. 90	217.6	135.2	Irapuato, Gto.	Zapotlanejo, Jal.	—	—	
Fed. 90	118.1	73.4	Ameca, Jal.	Mascota, Jal.	—	—	
Fed. 93	217.6	135.2	Tehuixtla, Pue. Jilotepec, Gro.	Tulcingo, Pue. Chilpancingo, Gro.	—	—	
Fed. 95	361.5	224.6	Mexico City	Acapulco, Gro.	—	—	
Fed. 97	113.25	70.37	Reynosa, Tamps.	Ampliación la Loma, Tamps.	—	—	
Fed. 98	58.5	36.4	Minatitlán, Col.	Pez Vela Junction, Col.	—	—	
Fed. 101	492	306	Matamoros, Tamps.	Tula Junction, Tamps.	—	—	
Fed. 102	137.1	85.2	Álamo, Ver.	Tamazunchale, SLP	—	—	
Fed. 103	16.22	10.08	Michapa, Mor.	Amacuzac, Mor.	—	—	
Fed. 105	260.68	161.98	Tempoal, Ver.	Pachuca, Hgo.	—	—	
Fed. 106	28.35	17.62	Tres Marías, Mor.	Santa Martha, Mex.	—	—	
Fed. 107	58	36	Jiménez, Tamps.	Soto la Marina, Tamps.	—	—	
Fed. 110	125.29	77.85	San Luis de la Paz, Gto.	Los Infantes, Gto.	—	—	
Fed. 110	350.1	217.5	Patti, Mich.	Colima, Col.	—	—	
Fed. 111	35.11	21.82	San Miguel de Allende, Gto.	Buenavista, Qro.	—	—	
Fed. 113	56	35	Mexico City	Oaxtepec, Mor.	—	—	
Fed. 115	138.14	85.84	Ixtapaluca, Mex.	Izúcar de Matamoros, Pue.	—	—	
Fed. 117	24.81	15.42	Tlatempa, Tlax.	San Martín Texmelucan, Pue.	—	—	
Fed. 119	146.37	90.95	Tejocotal, Hgo. Tlaxcala, Tlax.	Apizaco, Tlax. Puebla, Pue.	—	—	
Fed. 120	718.31	446.34	Xilitla, SLP Quiroga, Mich.	San José, Mich. Tepalcatepec, Mich.	—	—	
Fed. 121	34.9	21.7	Apizaco, Tlax.	Puebla, Pue.	—	—	
Fed. 125	494.9	307.5	Conejos, Ver. Tehuacán, Pue. Yucudaa, Oax.	Fortín de las Flores, Ver. Huajuapan de León, Oax. Pinotepa Nacional, Oax.	—	—	
Fed. 126	139.2	86.5	El Oro de Hidalgo, Mex.	Morelia, Mich.	—	—	
Fed. 127	306.05	190.17	Pánuco, Ver. Poza Rica, Ver.	Tihuatlán, Ver. María de la Torre, Ver.	—	—	Portions of Poza Rica stretch not part of the federal highway system
Fed. 129	251	156	Nautla, Ver.	Amozoc de Mota, Pue.	—	—	
Fed. 130	247	153	Tuxpan, Ver.	Pachuca, Hgo.	—	—	
Fed. 131	49.1	30.5	Teziutlán, Pue.	Perote, Ver.	—	—	
Fed. 131	248	154	Oaxaca, Oax.	Puerto Escondido, Oax.	—	—	
Fed. 132	84.08	52.24	Ecatepec, Mex.	Tulancingo, Hgo.	—	—	
Fed. 134	464.6	288.7	Naucalpan, Mex.	Zihuatanejo, Gro.	—	—	
Fed. 135	202.7	126.0	Tehuacán, Pue.	San Francisco Telixtlahuaca, Oax.	—	—	
Fed. 136	187.67	116.61	Zacatepec, Pue.	Los Reyes Acaquilpan, Mex.	—	—	
Fed. 138	23.12	14.37	San Bernardino, Mex.	Tepexpan, Mex.	—	—	
Fed. 140	265.57	165.02	Tepeaca, Pue.	Veracruz	—	—	
Fed. 144	73.67	45.78	Azumbilla, Pue.	San Salvador el Seco, Pue.	—	—	
Fed. 145	215.4	133.8	La Tinaja, Ver.	Sayula, Ver.	—	—	
Fed. 147	175	109	Tuxtepec, Oax.	Palomares, Oax.	—	—	
Fed. 150	461.24	286.60	Mexico City	Veracruz, Ver.	—	—	
Fed. 160	112.39	69.84	Cuernavaca, Mor.	Izúcar de Matamoros, Pue.	—	—	
Fed. 162	18.2	11.3	Cuernavaca, Mor.	Tepoztlán, Mor.	—	—	
Fed. 166	48.65	30.23	Alpuyeca, Mor.	Axixintla, Gro.	—	—	
Fed. 172	29.3	18.2	Minatitlán, Ver.	Coatzacoalcos, Ver.	—	—	
Fed. 175	579.35	359.99	Buenavista, Ver.	Puerto Ángel, Oax.	—	—	
Fed. 176	167.14	103.86	Mérida, Yuc.	Tizimín, Yuc.	—	—	
Fed. 178	37	23	Dzilam de Bravo, Yuc.	Cansahcab, Yuc.	—	—	
Fed. 179	238.7	148.3	Xochiapan, Ver.	San Pablo de Villa Mitla, Oax.	—	—	
Fed. 180	2240.92	1,392.44	Matamoros, Tamps.	Cancún, Q. Roo	—	—	
Fed. 182	185	115	Tuxtepec, Oax.	Teotitlán de Flores Magón, Oax.	—	—	
Fed. 184	216.97	134.82	Muna, Yuc.	Felipe Carrillo Puerto, Q. Roo	—	—	
Fed. 185	302.35	187.87	Coatzacoalcos, Ver.	Salina Cruz, Oax.	—	—	
Fed. 186	574.4	356.9	Villahermosa, Tab.	Chetumal, Q. Roo	—	—	
Fed. 187	185.47	115.25	El Bellote, Centla, Tab.	Raudales Malpaso, Chis.	—	—	
Fed. 190	1167.3	725.3	Puebla, Pue.	Ciudad Cuauhtémoc, Chis.	—	—	
Fed. 195	259	161	Villahermosa, Tab.	El Escopetazo, Chis.	—	—	
Fed. 196	26.3	16.3	Chilpancingo, Gro.	Chichihualco, Gro.	—	—	
Fed. 198	114.8	71.3	Cruz Grande, Gro.	Tierra Colorada, Gro.	—	—	
Fed. 199	210	130	Rancho Nuevo, Chis.	Catazajá, Chis.	—	—	
Fed. 200	2085	1,296	Tepic, Nay.	Talismán, Chis.	—	—	
Fed. 203	75.3	46.8	El Suspiro, Chis.	Tenosique, Tab.	—	—	
Fed. 203	126	78	El Jocote, Chis.	Huixtla, Tab.	—	—	
Fed. 221	76	47	Km.59, Campeche.	Nuevo Coahuila, Campeche.	—	—	
Fed. 217	76	47	Jonuta, Tabasco.	Palizada, Campeche.	—	—	
Fed. 225	76	47	Tapachula, Chis.	Puerto Madero, Chis.	—	—	Mileage includes 49 km spur to Ciudad Hidalgo
Fed. 261	272.37	169.24	Campeche, Camp. Mérida, Yuc.	Umán, Yuc. Progreso, Yuc.	—	—	
Fed. 281	89	55	Celestún, Yuc.	Mérida, Yuc.	—	—	
Fed. 293	99	62	Polyuc, Q. Roo	Pedro Antonio Santos, Q. Roo	—	—	
Fed. 295	251.6	156.3	Río Lagartos, Yuc.	Felipe Carrillo Puerto, Q. Roo	—	—	
Fed. 305	42.3	26.3	Leona Vicario, QRoo	Joaquin Zetina Guezca, Q. Roo	—	—	
Fed. 307	357.48	222.13	Puerto Juárez (Cancún), Q. Roo	Reforma Agraria (Chetumal), Q. Roo	—	—	
Fed. 307	194	121	Palenque, Chis.	La Trinitaria, Chis.	—	—	
Fed. Q20	46	29	Querétaro, Qro.	Santa Rosa Jáuregui, Qro.	—	—	

== State highways ==
Shield for Sonora State Highway 40, using the typical design in almost all states

Every state in Mexico builds and maintains their own state highways, which supplement the federal network. Some of these roads are unnumbered; those that are have varying numbering schemes depending on the state. Shields for these roads contain the abbreviation of the state up top. State highways that are tolled, like their federal counterparts, bear a D in their designations, such as Sinaloa State Highway 1D.

== See also ==
- Pan-American Highway
- Inter-American Highway
