= List of Mexican autopistas =

This is a list of autopistas, or tolled (cuota) highways, in Mexico. Tolled roads are often built as bypasses, as toll bridges, and to provide direct intercity connections.

Many federal highways corridors numbers cover more than one autopista; other federal highways do not have limited access sections. Normally, Mexican federal highways that are on toll roads have the letter suffix "D" for Directo, e.g. Fed. 45 is free (libre) and Fed. 45D is toll (cuota). Most autopistas have a toll over all or part of their length. A few autopistas in very mountainous areas are two-lane.

The Mexican limited access highway network is the largest in the Americas outside the USA. The construction is generally financed by toll revenue (thus user fees) rather than fuel taxes, thus the toll rates are usually rather high, about MXN $1–$2 per kilometer ($1.6–$3.2/mi), roughly 15–30 US cents per mile (9.3–18.6 ¢/km) for private cars and motorcycles. Toll plazas along the mainline charge tolls anywhere from MXN $20 to $300, or US$1 to $15. Plazas, crossing the border, accept either pesos or U.S. dollars, but after leaving border city limits one must pay in pesos. The IAVE electronic toll collection system is available in Mexico's major cities to facilitate toll payments.

== List of autopistas ==
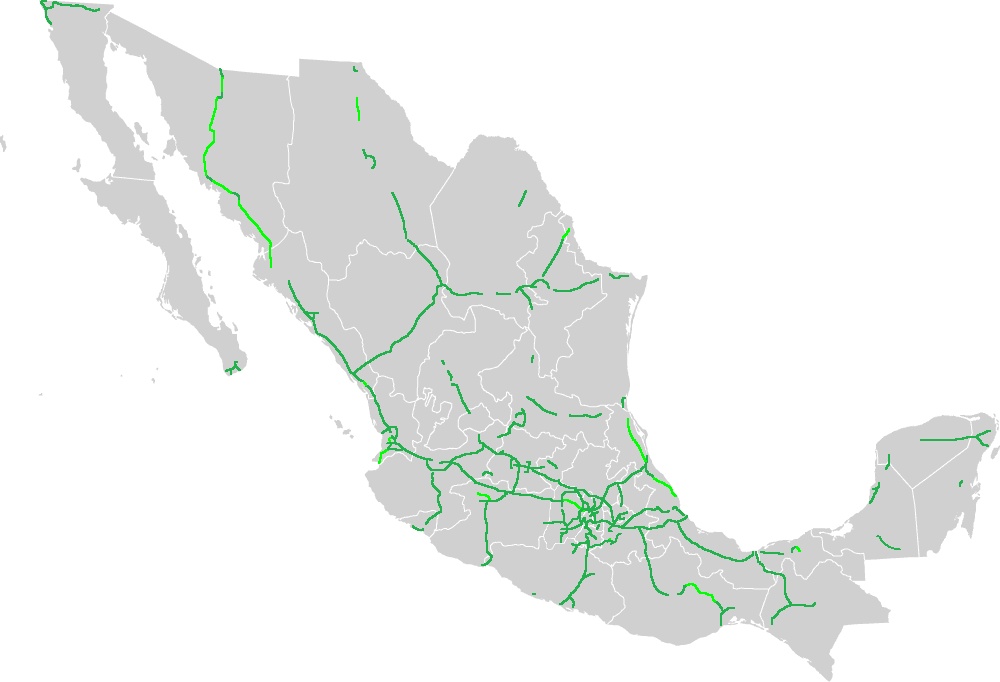
Map of the network

Number	Length (km)	Length (mi)	Southern or western terminus	Northern or eastern terminus	Formed	Removed	Notes
Fed. 1D	99	62	Tijuana, BC	Ensenada, BC	1967	current	
Fed. 1D	58.884	36.589	Los Cabos International Airport, BCS	Cabo San Lucas, BCS	2015	current	
Fed. 2D	193	120	Tijuana, BC	Mexicali, BC	1991	current	
Fed. 2D	73	45	Altar, Son.	Santa Ana, Son.	2006	current	
Fed. 2D	44	27	Reynosa, Tamps.	Matamoros, Tamps.	1999	current	
Fed. 14D	124.1	77.1	Cuitzeo, Mich.	Uruapan, Mich.	1998	current	
Fed. 15D	548	341	Nogales, Son.	Estación Don, Son.	1992	current	Includes bypasses of Nogales, Magdalena de Kino, Guaymas and Hermosillo
Fed. 15D	20.2	12.6	Libramiento de Culiacán, Sin.		2012	current	
Fed. 15D	190.26	118.22	Culiacán, Sin.	Mazatlán, Sin.	1992	current	
Fed. 15D	37.64	23.39	Libramiento de Mazatlán, Sin.		2014	current	
Fed. 15D	238.05	147.92	Mazatlán, Sin.	Tepic, Nay.	2005	current	
Fed. 15D	30	19	Libramiento de Tepic, Nay.		2016	current	
Fed. 15D	168.616	104.773	Tepic, Nay.	Guadalajara, Jal.	1994	current	
Fed. 15D	311.38	193.48	Zapotlanejo, Jal.	Maravatío, Mich.	1993	current	
Fed. 15D	64.35	39.99	Maravatío, Mich.	Atlacomulco, Méx.	1989	current	
Fed. 15D	34	21	Toluca, Méx.	Mexico City	1990	current	
Fed. 37D	218.5	135.8	Uruapan, Mich.	Lázaro Cárdenas, Mich.	2005	current	
Fed. 40D	238	148	Mazatlán, Sin.	Durango, Dgo.	2013	current	
Fed. 40D	21.6	13.4	Libramiento de Durango, Dgo.		—	—	
Fed. 40D	222.2	138.1	Durango, Dgo.	Gómez Palacio, Dgo.	1993	current	
Fed. 40D	40.77	25.33	Libramiento Norte de la Laguna, Jal.		2014	current	
Fed. 40D	115.019	71.469	Torreón, Coah.	Saltillo, Coah.	1994	current	
Fed. 40D	49.89	31.00	Saltillo, Coah.	Monterrey, NL	2009	current	
Fed. 40D	132.105	82.086	Cadereyta, NL	Reynosa, Tamps.	1993	current	
Fed. 40D	36.4	22.6	Libramiento de Reynosa Sur II, Tamps.		—	—	
Fed. 43D	107.95	67.08	Morelia, Mich.	Salamanca, Gto.	2006	current	
Fed. 45D	104.7	65.1	Querétaro, Qro.	Irapuato, Gto.	1962	current	
Fed. 45D	79	49	Salamanca, Gto.	León, Gto.	2015	current	
Fed. 45D	103.85	64.53	León, Gto.	Aguascalientes, Ags.	1992	current	
Fed. 45D	42.31	26.29	Cuauhtémoc, Zac.	Osiris, Zac.	2002	current	
Fed. 45D	12.2	7.6	Libramiento de Víctor Rosales, Zac.		1991	current	
Fed. 45D	20.05	12.46	Libramiento de Fresnillo, Zac.		1993	current	
Fed. 45D	68.98	42.86	Ciudad Jiménez, Chih.	Ciudad Camargo, Chih.	1990	current	
Fed. 45D	65	40	Ciudad Camargo, Chih.	Ciudad Delicias, Chih.	1989	current	
Fed. 45D	42.2	26.2	Libramiento Oriente de Chihuahua, Chih.		2015	current	
Fed. 45D	13.18	8.19	Chihuahua, Chih.	Sacramento, Chih.	—	—	
Fed. 45D	83.63	51.97	El Sueco, Chih.	Villa Ahumada, Chih.	1989	current	
Fed. 47D	90	56	Macrolibramiento Palmillas-Apaseo el Grande		2017	current	
Fed. 49D	151.3	94.0	Gómez Palacio, Dgo.	Ciudad Jiménez, Chih.	1994	current	
Fed. 54D	148	92	Guadalajara, Jal.	Colima, Col.	1989	current	
Fed. 55D	65.8	40.9	Atlacomulco, Méx.	Toluca, Méx.	1989	current	
Fed. 57D	54	34	Nueva Rosita, Coah.	Allende, Coah.	—	—	
Fed. 57D	21	13	Libramiento Oriente de Saltillo, Coah.		1992	current	
Fed. 57D	32	20	Puerto México, NL	La Carbonera, NL	1994	current	
Fed. 57D	14.2	8.8	Libramiento de Matehuala, SLP		2004	current	
Fed. 57D	31.5	19.6	Libramiento Norponiente de San Luis Potosí, SLP		2014	current	
Fed. 57D	33.76	20.98	Libramiento Oriente de San Luis Potosí, SLP		1991	current	
Fed. 57D	37	23	Libramiento Nororiente de Querétaro, Qro.		1992	current	
Fed. 57D	175.454	109.022	Querétaro, Qro.	Mexico City	1958	current	
Fed. 68D	38	24	Chapalilla, Nay.	Compostela, Nay.	1973	current	
Fed. 70D	14.478	8.996	Libramiento Poniente de Tampico, Tamps.		1991	current	
Fed. 70D	117.6	73.1	Rayón, SLP	Tamuín, SLP	2016	current	
Fed. 70D	55.1	34.2	Jala, Nay.	Compostela, Nay.	2018	current	
Fed. 76D	32.4	20.1	Autopista Tepic–San Blas, Nay.		2017	current	
Fed. 80D	118.5	73.6	Zapotlanejo, Jal.	Lagos de Moreno, Jal.	1991	current	
Fed. 80D	66.048	41.040	Lagos de Moreno, Jal.	Villa de Arriaga, SLP	2012	current	
Fed. 80D	9.75	6.06	Libramiento Norte de San Patricio-Melaque, Jal.		2017	current	
Fed. 85D	45.8	28.5	Mexico City	Pachuca, Hgo.	1994	current	
Fed. 85D	123.1	76.5	Monterrey, NL	Nuevo Laredo, Tamps.	1991	current	
Fed. 90D	26	16	Zapotlanejo, Jal.	Guadalajara, Jal.	1994	current	
Fed. 91D	62.8	39.0	Puente de Ixtla, Mor.	Iguala, Gro.	1994	current	
Fed. 92D	25.64	15.93	Zacapalco, Gro.	Taxco, Gro.	1996	current	
Fed. 93D	20.6	12.8	Chilpancingo, Gro.	Tixtla, Gro.	2011	current	
Fed. 95D	61.54	38.24	Mexico City	Cuernavaca, Mor.	1952	current	
Fed. 95D	262.58	163.16	Cuernavaca, Mor.	Acapulco, Gro.	1990	current	
Fed. 95D	2.953	1.835	Maxitúnel Interurbano Acapulco, Gro.		1996	current	
Fed. 110D	21.388	13.290	Libramiento Norte de La Piedad, Mich.		2012	current	
Fed. 115D	26.810	16.659	Libramiento de Amecameca-Nepantla, Méx.		2014	current	
Fed. 117D	19.419	12.066	San Martín Texmelucan, Pue.	Tlaxcala, Tlax.	1991	current	
Fed. 117D	11	6.8	Libramiento de Tlaxcala, Tlax.		2015	current	
Fed. 119D	72	45	Tlaxco, Tlax.	Tejocotal, Gro.	—	—	
Fed. 130D	67.789	42.122	Gutiérrez Zamora, Ver.	Tuxpan, Ver.	1994	current	
Fed. 132D	143.08	88.91	Tihuatlán, Ver.	Tulancingo, Hgo.	2014	current	
Fed. 132D	22.2	13.8	San Martín de las Pirámides, Méx.	Ecatepec, Méx.	1991	current	
Fed. 134D	39.2	24.4	Autopista Toluca–Naucalpan, Méx.		2007	current	Started construction in 2007 but has been in construction for 10 years
Fed. 135D	243	151	Cuacnopalan, Pue.	Oaxaca, Oax.	1994	current	
Fed. 136D	16.17	10.05	Peñón, Mexico City	Texcoco, Méx.	1994	current	
Fed. 140D	195	121	Puebla, Pue.	Xalapa, Ver.	2004	current	
Fed. 145D	228.1	141.7	La Tinaja, Ver.	Cosoleacaque, Ver.	1993	current	
Fed. 150D	397.77	247.16	Mexico City	Veracruz, Ver.	1962	current	
Fed. 160D	34.165	21.229	La Pera, Mor.	Cuautla, Mor.	1994	current	
Fed. 180D	2.5	1.6	Libramiento de José Cardel, Ver.		—	—	
Fed. 180D	28.5	17.7	José Cardel, Ver.	Veracruz, Ver.	1994	current	
Fed. 180D	34	21	Nuevo Teapa, Ver.	Cosoleacaque, Ver.	—	—	
Fed. 180D	53	33	Coatzacoalcos, Ver.	Cárdenas, Tab.	2000	current	
Fed. 180D	23.7	14.7	Libramiento de Villahermosa, Tab.		2016	current	
Fed. 180D	39.5	24.5	Champotón, Camp.	Campeche, Camp.	1993	current	
Fed. 180D	241.34	149.96	Mérida/Kantunil, Yuc.	Cancún, QR	1991	current	
Fed. 185D	75.39	46.85	Salina Cruz, Oax.	La Ventosa, Oax.	2003	current	
Fed. 187D	197.5	122.7	Las Choapas, Ver.	Ocozocoautla, Chis.	2002	current	
Fed. 190D	169.23	105.15	San Pablo Villa de Mitla, Oax.	Tehuantepec, Oax.	—	—	Under construction
Fed. 190D	93.77	58.27	Ocozocoautla, Chis.	Arriaga, Chis.	2010	current	
Fed. 190D	46	29	Tuxtla Gutiérrez, Chis.	San Cristóbal de las Casas, Chis.	2006	current	
Fed. 200D	46	29	Manzanillo, Col.	Armería, Col.	1991	current	
Fed. 200D	4.369	2.715	Libramiento de Tecpan de Galeana, Gro.		2008	current	
Fed. 200D	140.8	87.5	Tepic, Nay.	Puerto Vallarta, Jal.	2019	current	Under Construction
Fed. 305D	44	27	El Tintal, QR	Playa del Carmen, QR	2014	current	
Fed. 307D	14.14	8.79	Libramiento Felipe Carrillo Puerto, QR		2016	current	
Fed. I-20D	29.2	18.1	Libramiento Norponiente de Irapuato, Gto.		2011	current	
Fed. M40D	223	139	Autopista Arco Norte; Atlacomulco, Méx. — San Martín Texmelucan, Pue.		2009	current	
Fed. S30	46.21	28.71	Libramiento Norponiente de Saltillo, Coah.		2010	current	
Fed. GUA 10D	111	69	Macrolibramiento Sur de Guadalajara, Jal.		2018	current	
