= Mexican Federal Highway =

Federal Highways
- One-, two-, three-digit, and letter designation shields and tollway shield

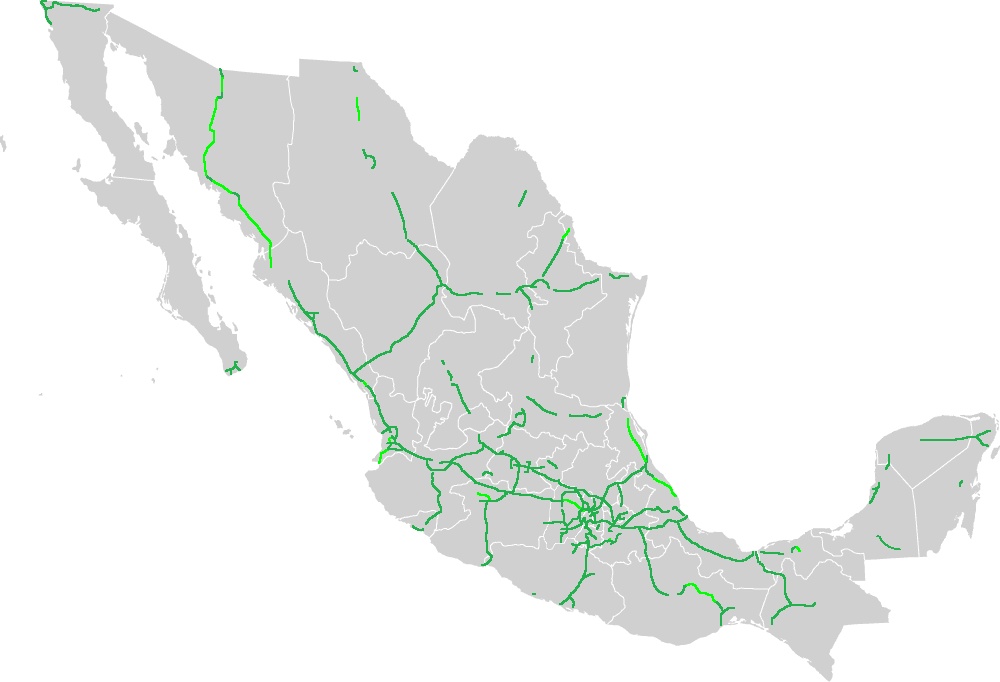
- Map of the autopistas

System information
- Maintained by Secretariat of Infrastructure, Communications and Transportation

Highway names
- Federal Highway: Federal Highway X (Fed. X)

System links
- Mexican Federal Highways; List; Autopistas

Federal Highways (Spanish: Carreteras Federales) are a series of highways in Mexico. These highways link Mexico's 32 federal entities with each other or with a neighboring country, and they are wholly or mostly built by Mexico's federal government with federal funds or through federal grants by individuals, states, or municipalities. Locally known as federal highway corridors (Spanish: los corredores carreteros federales), they are built and maintained by Mexico's Secretariat of Infrastructure, Communications and Transportation (Spanish: Secretaría de Infraestructura, Comunicaciones y Transportes, SICT). Federal Highways in Mexico can be classified into high-speed, limited access expressways (usually toll highways that may be segmented and are marked by the letter "D") and low-speed roads with non-limited access; not all corridors are completely improved.

== High speed, limited-access expressways ==
High-speed expressways, known as autopistas or carreteras de cobro, are limited-access toll roads with controlled interchanges. Access to these roads is generally prohibited for pedestrians and animal-drawn vehicles, and fences are located at the side of the road for most of the length. Autopistas are highways with four or more defined lanes. Supercarreteras are toll roads with only two lanes, and they are found in mountainous areas. These tolled expressways typically have a corresponding non-limited-access road adjacent to them as a free alternative. In this system, the tolled road is signified by the word Cuota (toll), and the free road by the word Libre (free). The maximum speed limit is normally 110 km/h (68 mph) for cars and 95 km/h (59 mph) for buses and trucks. In some cases, the maximum speed can be 120 km/h (75 mph).

== Low speed, non-limited-access roads ==
Low-speed roads, known as carreteras, comprise the majority of the roads in this system. Some of these roads are divided highways with four or more lanes, often single-carriageway roads which have been converted into dual carriageways by building an adjacent carriageway next to the existing one. These roads are free of charge, and in most cases, two-lane highways that connect almost all of Mexico. These roads have interchanges at major roads, but most of these intersections are at grade. The maximum speed limit is 100 km/h (62 mph) for cars and 95 km/h (59 mph) for buses and trucks.

== Numbering system ==
North–south highways are assigned odd numbers, while east-west highways are identified by even numbers. The start of the numbering system is located in the northwest of the country.

=== Exceptions to the numbering system ===
There are two exceptions to the numbering system:

1. Federal Highway 14 (Fed. 14) and Federal Highway 14D (Fed. 14D) from Uruapan, Michoacán, to Morelia, Michoacán, located in the midwest of the country.
2. Several roads with letter designations: the Autopista Arco Norte (M40D), Fed. I-20D (Libramiento de Irapuato), Fed. S30 (Libramiento Norponiente de Saltillo, signed as 40D) and, Fed. GUA 10D (Macrolibramiento Sur De Guadalajara).

== Incidents ==
- Mexico toll booth interstate disaster
- Chiapas truck crash

== See also ==
- List of Mexican Federal Highways
- List of Mexican autopistas
