= Transportation in San Diego–Tijuana =

Transportation in San Diego–Tijuana occurs by various means. Though, in the four cities of San Diego, Tijuana, Tecate, and Rosarito Beach, the automobile serves as most important means of transportation. The international metropolitan region maintains an intricate highway infrastructure. As a large metropolitan area in Western North America, many roadways, including Interstates, State Routes, and Mexican Federal Highways, hold a terminus in the area. These roads have grown accustomed to support the masses of the commuting populace within the international region and are constantly being expanded and/or renovated. Transportation is a crucial issue in the metropolitan area. The streets and highways of the region affect environmental health and have influence over the degree of regional connectivity. Binational discussions about coordinating public transportation across the border are currently underway. San Diego–Tijuana is the site of two major international airports and numerous regional airports. It is also the site of the Port of San Diego and miles from the nearby Port of Ensenada.

== Major highways ==
The major freeways within the conurbation are Interstate 5, Interstate 8, Interstate 15, and Interstate 805 linking San Diego–Tijuana with regions from as far away as the Pacific Northwest, the Arizona Sun Corridor, and the Rocky Mountains; and Fed 1, Fed 2, and Fed 3 (and corresponding toll roads for highways 1 and 2) connecting the metropolitan region to Ensenada, Baja California Sur, and the Mexicali Valley. Interstate 5 and Fed 1 are critical to the North American Free Trade Agreement due to their confluence at the San Ysidro Port of Entry linking British Columbia, the West Coast of the United States and the Gold Coast of Baja California at the busiest port of entry in the world. In the Imperial and Mexicali valleys, both Interstate 8 and Fed 2 are connected by State Route 111 and from this junction lead to the coastal center at San Diego–Tijuana. This connection ultimately links the region to the Rio Grande Valley on the Gulf of Mexico.

Within the metropolitan region, Interstate 805 is a freeway that links Tijuana to Del Mar, running through the South Bay cities of Chula Vista and National City. San Diego–Tijuana is linked to Ensenada by numerous ways. These include Fed 3 that runs from Tecate thru Valley of the Palms to the port city, and by way of Fed 1 and Fed 1D that run from Tijuana thru Rosarito Beach to the Cinderella of the Pacific.

State Routes connect regions of the metropolitan region with other California agglomerations. State Route 79 connects to the Greater Los Angeles area and State Route 78 connects to the Imperial Valley. On a regional scale State Route 52 connects communities in northern San Diego. Routes connecting Ports of Entry larger San Diego county cities, include State Route 905 connecting the Otay Mesa Port of Entry with large South Bay cities. Others such as State Route 125 link South Bay with East County. Some routes are much more extensive connecting areas such as South Bay with those as far away as the Mountain Empire as State Route 94 does.

=== Interstates ===
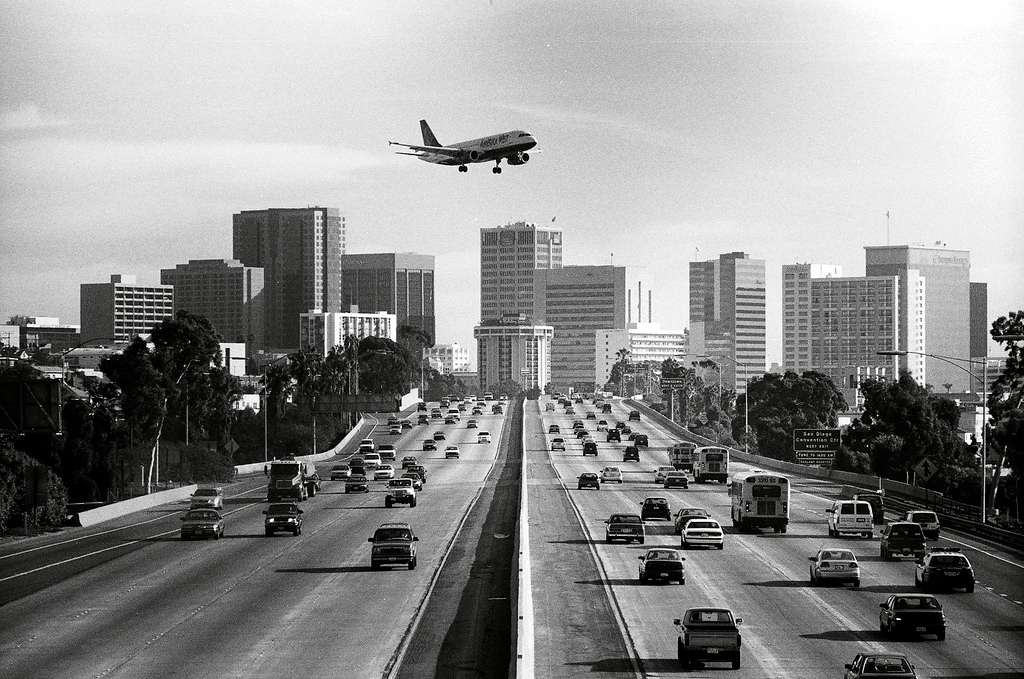
I-5 looking south toward downtown San Diego, January 2002.

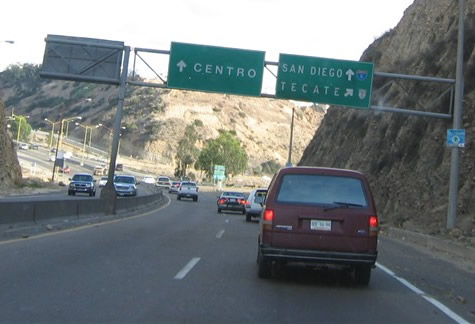
Fed. 1 towards San Diego and the Rio Zone

- Interstate 5 - San Diego Freeway
- Interstate 8 - Mission Valley Freeway, Ocean Beach Freeway
- Interstate 15 - Escondido Freeway
- Interstate 805 - Jacob Dekema Freeway

=== California State Routes ===
- State Route 15
- State Route 52
- State Route 56
- State Route 75
- State Route 78
- State Route 79
- State Route 94
- State Route 125
- State Route 163
- State Route 905

=== Federal Tollways ===
- Fed 1D - Tijuana–Ensenada Scenic Tollway
- Fed 2D - Mexicali–Tijuana Tollway

=== Federal Highways ===
- Fed 1 - Transpeninsular Highway
- Fed 2 - California Border Highway
- Fed 3 - Tecate Federal Highway

=== Baja California State Highways ===
- State Highway 201 - Corredor Tijuana-Rosarito 2000

== Maritime transport ==
The only deepwater port in the metropolitan region is the Port of San Diego. It is one of three major ports in Southern California as well as the primary entry point for numerous automobile brands. Carnival Cruise Lines, Royal Caribbean Cruises, and Holland America Line are among nine cruise line companies to serve the region. The cruise ships have stops in Ensenada, to the south, and in Los Angeles and Long Beach, to the north.

Marinas dot the coast line of San Diego–Tijuana. Nineteen currently exist in San Diego County.

== Air transport ==
San Diego International and Tijuana International Airports service the metropolitan area. They are the major venues by which air transport occurs. Tijuana International Airport now is home to the CBX. Lastly, there is McClellan-Palomar Airport in Carlsbad.

== See also ==
- Transportation in San Diego
