= Transportation in San Diego =

Transportation in American city

The following is a list of transportation options in San Diego, California.

== Public transportation ==
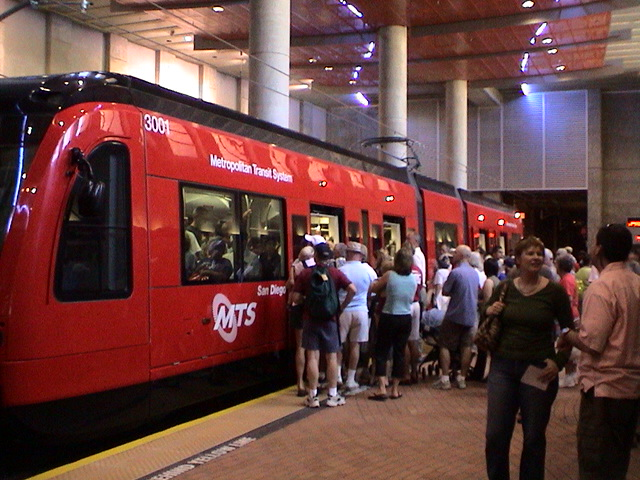
San Diego Trolley at San Diego State University (SDSU)

San Diego is served by the San Diego Trolley, bus (operated by the San Diego Metropolitan Transit System), COASTER, and Amtrak. The trolley primarily serves downtown and surrounding urban communities, Mission Valley, east county, the coastal south bay, and the international border. A planned Mid-Coast line will operate from Old Town to University City along the Interstate 5 Freeway. There are also plans for a Silver Line to expand trolley service downtown.

The Amtrak and COASTER trains currently run along the coastline and connect San Diego with Los Angeles, Orange County, San Bernardino, Riverside, and Ventura via Metrolink. There are two Amtrak stations in San Diego, Old Town Transit Center and Santa Fe Depot.

The bus is available along almost all major routes; however, a large number of bus stops are concentrated in central San Diego. Typical wait times vary from 15 to 60 minutes, depending on the location and route. Trolleys arrive at each station every 7 to 30 minutes (depending on time of day and which trolley line is used). Ferries are also available every half hour crossing San Diego Bay to Coronado.

=== Public transportation statistics ===
In San Diego, the average amount of time people spend commuting with public transit to and from work on a weekday is 70 min. 23% of public transit riders, ride for more than 2 hours every day. The average amount of time people wait at a stop or station for public transit is 16 min, while 29% of riders wait for over 20 minutes on average every day. The average distance people usually ride in a single trip with public transit is 11.2 km, while 30% travel for over 12 km in a single direction.

== Cycling ==
The dry and mild climate of San Diego makes cycling a convenient and pleasant year-round option. The city has some segregated cycle facilities, particularly in newer developments, however the majority of road facilities specifically for bicycles are painted on regular roadways, covering over 1,570 miles throughout San Diego County. The city's hilly, canyoned terrain and long average trip distances—brought about by strict low-density zoning laws—somewhat restrict cycling for utilitarian purposes.

In 2014 of .9% of commuters traveled by bicycle, below the average 1% for large U.S. cities. Also in 2014, San Diego experienced 6.8 bicyclist fatalities per 10,000 cyclist commuters, the average for all large cities was 4.7.

A bicycle sharing system called DecoBike was instituted in 2015.

As e-bikes grew in popularity during 2026, penalties for riders increased. However, San Diego still struggled with building bike-friendly road infrastructure. As of 2026, only 264 of San Diego’s 1,883.5 miles of bike lanes were separate from vehicle traffic. In the same year, the annual rate of new and improved bike lanes had decreased sixty percent from 2021.

Supportive San Diego council members seeking funding for new cyclist projects found budgeting to be a concern. Around three percent of SANDAG’s $41.8 billion spending plan was allocated for improving active transportation over the following decade.

== Air ==
San Diego has two major international airports entirely or extending into its city limits:

San Diego International Airport is the primary commercial airport serving San Diego. It is the busiest single-runway airport in the world. It serves over 24 million passengers every year, and is located on San Diego Bay three miles (4.8 km) from downtown. There are scheduled flights to the rest of the United States, Canada, Japan, Mexico, United Kingdom, Germany, and Switzerland. It serves as a focus city for Southwest Airlines and Alaska Airlines. Voters rejected a proposal to move the airport to Marine Corps Air Station Miramar in November 2006.

Since December 9, 2015, the Cross Border Xpress terminal in Otay Mesa has given direct access to Tijuana International Airport, with passengers walking across the Mexico–United States border on a footbridge to catch their flight on the Mexican side. It is the only airport in the world with terminals located on the territory of two countries.

Other airports include Brown Field Municipal Airport and Montgomery-Gibbs Executive Airport.

== Sea ==
The Port of San Diego manages the maritime operations of San Diego harbor. Cruise ships arrive and depart from San Diego's cruise ship terminal on B Street Pier. Carnival Cruise Lines and Holland America have home port cruise ships in San Diego during the winter season. A second cruise terminal on Broadway Pier opened in 2010.

San Diego is home to General Dynamics' National Steel and Shipbuilding Company (NASSCO), the largest shipyard on the West Coast of the United States. It is capable of building and repairing large ocean-going vessels. The yard constructs commercial cargo ships and auxiliary vessels for the U.S. Navy and Military Sealift Command, which it has served since 1960.

== Roads ==
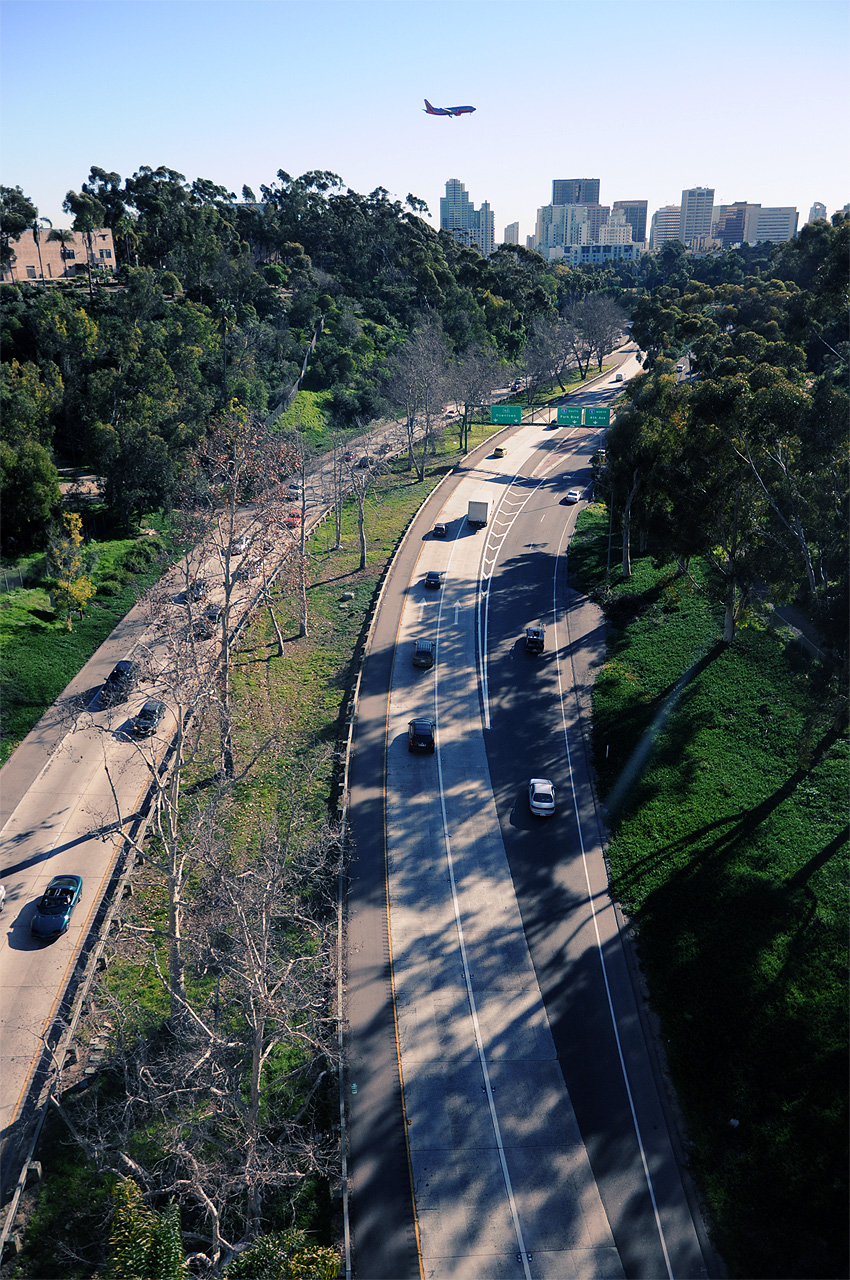
Cabrillo Freeway leading into Downtown San Diego

The streets and highways of San Diego reflect the automotive city development as well as its "urban sprawl" historic growth pattern. Major freeways were built and repeatedly expanded to serve the needs of commuters coming into the city from the suburban regions of North County, South Bay, and East County, as well as the Tijuana metropolitan area. The importance of tourism to the city also stimulated the development of roads, since 70% of tourists visiting San Diego arrive by car.

=== Major highways ===
==== Interstates ====
San Diego is the terminus of three primary interstate highways. The region is also served by one three-digit auxiliary interstate.

Interstate 5 San Diego Freeway	Interstate 5 begins at the U.S.-Mexico border and heads north through downtown and the coastal portion of the city, continuing through North County to Los Angeles.
Interstate 8 Ocean Beach Freeway; Kumeyaay Highway	Interstate 8 has its western terminus at the intersection with Sunset Cliffs Boulevard in Ocean Beach, and heads east through Mission Valley and San Diego's eastern suburbs before heading through East County to the Imperial Valley and Arizona.
Interstate 15; Escondido Freeway	Interstate 15 begins at I-8 in Mission Valley. It heads northeast through the city's inland suburbs before continuing through the Inland Empire to Las Vegas.
Interstate 805; Jacob Dekema Freeway	Interstate 805 is a bypass of Interstate 5 that begins just north of the Mexican border in San Ysidro and rejoins I-5 near Del Mar, at an intersection known as "The Merge".

==== California State Routes ====
State highways in San Diego include the following:

State Route 11	SR 11 is a short freeway, running from the SR 125/SR 905 interchange east to its current terminus at Enrico Fermi Drive in Otay Mesa. In the future SR 11 will extend east as a toll road to the Otay Mesa East Port of Entry.
State Route 15; Escondido Freeway	SR 15 is a continuation of I-15, running from the I-8/I-15 interchange south to I-5 in Southeast San Diego near the 32nd Street Naval Station.
State Route 52; San Clemente Canyon Freeway; Mount Soledad Freeway	SR 52 connects La Jolla with East County through Santee and SR 125.
State Route 54; South Bay Freeway; Jamacha Boulevard	SR 54 begins at I-5 in National City, then travels northeast to SR 125 near Spring Valley. SR 54 then continues northeast on Jamacha Road to El Cajon.
State Route 56; Ted Williams Freeway	SR 56 connects I-5 with I-15 through Carmel Valley and Rancho Peñasquitos.
State Route 67; San Vicente Freeway	SR 67 runs north away from I-8 and El Cajon towards Lakeside, where it becomes a smaller road and continues north towards Ramona.
State Route 75; San Diego-Coronado Bridge; Silver Strand Boulevard; Palm Avenue	SR 75 spans San Diego Bay as the San Diego-Coronado Bridge, then heads south along the Silver Strand from Coronado to South San Diego, where it becomes Palm Avenue
State Route 78; San Pasqual Valley Road	SR 78 is present within the city limits of San Diego from San Pasqual Road to Guejito Truck Trail. SR 78 continues west to Escondido and Oceanside and the eastern continuation heads toward Brawley in Imperial County and up to I-10 near Blythe in Riverside County.
State Route 94; Martin Luther King Jr. Freeway; Campo Road	SR 94 connects downtown with I-805, SR 15, and East County.
State Route 125; South Bay Expressway	SR 125 connects East County cities from SR 905 near the Otay Mesa Port of Entry north to Santee. The segment of SR 125 from SR 11 and SR 905 to SR 54 is a toll road, the South Bay Expressway.
State Route 163; Cabrillo Freeway; Dean E. Beattie Memorial Highway	SR 163 connects downtown with the northeast part of the city, intersects I-805 and merges with I-15 at Miramar. The stretch of SR 163 that passes through Balboa Park is San Diego's oldest freeway, and has been called one of America's most beautiful parkways.
State Route 905; Otay Mesa Freeway	SR 905 connects I-5 and I-805 to the Otay Mesa Port of Entry.

.

=== Major streets ===
- Rosecrans Street (formerly California State Route 209)
- Balboa Avenue (formerly California State Route 274)
- El Cajon Boulevard (Interstate 8 business loop, formerly part of U.S. Route 80)

== See also ==
- Transportation in San Diego–Tijuana
