= El Cajon Boulevard riot =

1960 riot in San Diego, California

The El Cajon Boulevard Riot was the official name of what the San Diego Union called the Drag Strip Riot. Some people consider the El Cajon Boulevard Riot one of the first major youth riots of the 1960s.

== About ==
The riot began during the evening of August 20, 1960 as an organized protest over the closing of Hourglass Field, an unused United States Navy airfield, to drag racing. The drag racing had been organized by the San Diego Timing Association, a local group of hot rod clubs, but was unauthorized. The Navy and the police looked the other way because Hourglass Field was the only off-street venue available for drag racing at the time.

On August 8, 1960, three (possibly four) bystanders were injured during a drag race. The Navy had been under some pressure to crack down on the drag racing and shut down the airfield to drag racing after the incident. Car clubs lobbied the city for an official drag racing site but were denied as the San Diego Police Chief A.E. Jensen said "Drag strips actually stimulate highway recklessness among those viewing such contests".

The Protest was organized by thousands of fliers that were spread around town at coffee shops, car clubs, movie theaters and other places where people would gather. These fliers stated that there would be a "mass protest meeting" on El Cajon Boulevard on Sunday August 12. The news was also spread by the a DJ named Dick Boynton on the local radio station. Two days later the police arrested a printer by the name of Herbert Sturdyvin, 20, on suspicion of conspiracy of printing the fliers that were used to organize the protest. He was released two days later without charges due to the fact that the police did not have enough evidence.

This led to an organized mass protest the night of August 20 and 21 at the intersection of El Cajon Boulevard and Cherokee Street in San Diego. The crowd of about 3,000 teenagers and adults blocked three blocks of El Cajon Boulevard (one of San Diego's major east–west thoroughfares) and began holding impromptu drag races with just enough room for cars to race two-abreast down the street. Around 2 A.M. more than 65 police officers began quelling the riot first by ordering them to disperse and then moving in with tear gas and riot sticks. Some protestors tried to fight back by throwing coke bottles and rocks at the police and trying to overturn police cars. It took 3 hours to control the mob and two police officers were hurt during the course of the night. At the scene of the riot 80 adult demonstrators and 36 juveniles were arrested for the riot. The next night several drag racers drove around town taunting the police. This led to a further 100 people being arrested, including over 30 juveniles who were charged with curfew violations.

After the riot, the City of San Diego promised to form a committee to look into the problem of a lack of drag racing sites. The president of the National Hot Rod Association also pledged his support to getting local enthusiasts a place to race. Eventually, all of these pressures came together and two new Drag racing strips were opened. The San Diego Raceway opened in Ramona in 1963 and the Carlsbad Raceway opened in 1964. San Diego closed down after 1968 and Carlsbad after 2004. There was an attempt at running in the parking lot of Jack Murphy Stadium in an organized event in the 1970s, but currently drag strips in the Barona Reservation serve the purpose.

== See also ==
- Youth activism
- List of incidents of civil unrest in the United States
