= Hourglass Field =

Landing field of the United States Navy

Coordinates: 32°54′30″N 117°7′21″W

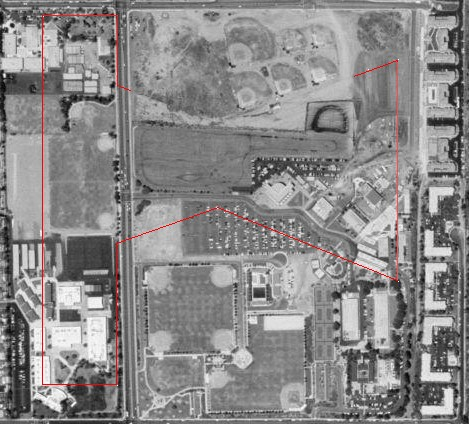
Aerial photo of Miramar College and Hourglass Field Community Park with the lost parts of the outline of Hourglass Field superimposed.

Hourglass Field was the popular name for an auxiliary landing field operated by the United States Navy before and during World War II in the northern part of San Diego, California. It is remembered as a racetrack in the regional road racing circuit and because a crackdown on unauthorized drag racing there triggered the El Cajon Boulevard Riot. A community college now occupies the site. Its athletics complex and a community park adjacent to the college are named after the airfield.

== History ==
Hourglass field was located just west of U.S. Route 395 (now Interstate 15), about three miles north of what is now MCAS Miramar. It was formerly known as Linda Vista Mesa Field and, later, Navy Outlying Field (NOLF) Miramar or Miramar Field / #01715 (OLF). From late 1931 to 1941 it was just a square clearing with an east-west runway. The popular name comes from the layout of the airport's runway system, which was a single piece of asphalt mostly in the shape of an hourglass (3 overlapping runways) which started construction in late 1941 and completed February 1, 1942. The hourglass field was primarily used for carrier landing practice during World War 2.

Around the time of World War II the Navy used the surrounding area as a bombing range. The Army also used the area as a test area.

In 1956 the Navy made the airfield available to the San Diego Junior Chamber of Commerce and the San Diego Region Sports Car Club of America (SCCA) for automobile racing. In 1957 a 1.8 mile track was laid out and the California Sport Car Club and San Diego Region SCCA staged races there for three years as part of the regional road racing circuit. The field was also used for motorcycle racing and unauthorized drag racing. In early August 1960, after three bystanders were injured during a drag race, the Navy shut down the airfield to racing. This led to an organized mass protest and a riot the night of August 20 and 21 in San Diego that the San Diego Union dubbed the drag strip riot and socialists call one of the first major youth riots of the 1960s.

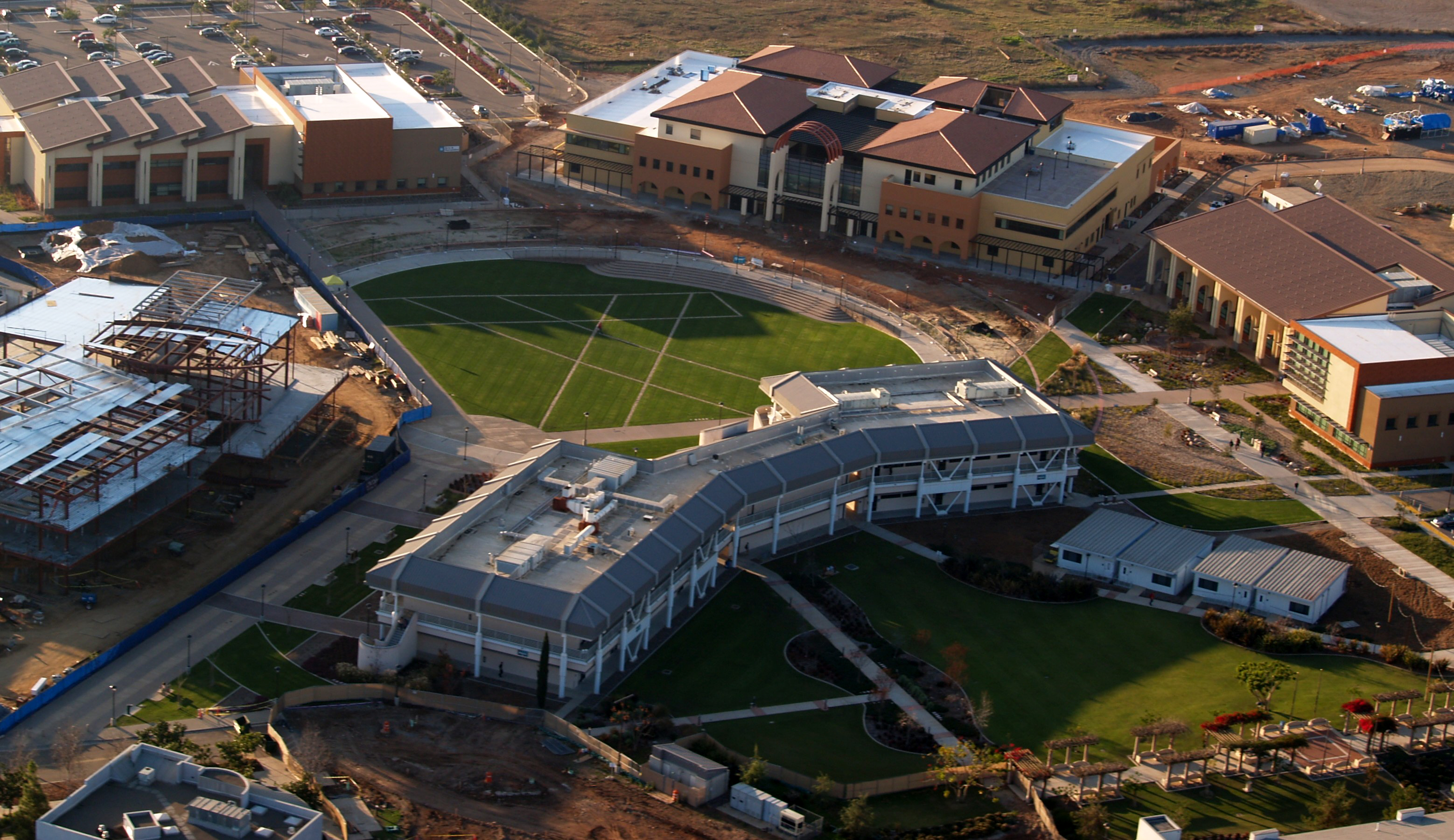
Hourglass Field Athletics Complex, 2012

Some time after the riot the Navy cut trenches across the Runways at Hourglass Field. The field was no longer useful for any kind of racing but became a popular spot for radio-controlled model aircraft, especially thermal soaring gliders flown by members of the Torrey Pines Gulls R/C Soaring Society, through the 1980s. In 1969 Miramar College opened on the site of Hourglass Field as a training facility for San Diego law enforcement and firefighting personnel. The site is now a small part of the large San Diego community of Mira Mesa.

Most of Hourglass Field is now gone. As of 2006 the northern edge of the hourglass still existed adjacent to the north side of the police/firefighter driving course. The southern edge of some baseball/softball fields paralleled the edge of runway 3/21, east of the indent of the "hourglass", separated by approximately 40 feet. The remaining surface of this part of runway 3/21 was used as a parking lot for the baseball/softball fields. As of 2012 only a small triangle of the original asphalt remains, from runway 13/31, as part of an open field adjacent to Black Mountain Road. Hourglass Field Athletics Complex now sits on the east end of the runway 3/21 location. Its grass plaza has narrow cobblestone features that outline an "X" and a bar reminiscent the runway layout.

The alignment of Black Mountain Road is adjacent to the former eastern edge of runway 18/36, the north/south runway (that was not part of the hourglass shape). Hourglass Field Community Park is near the former eastern edge of the southern one-third or so of the runway 18/36.
