= Mexican Federal Highway 5 =

Highway in Mexico

Federal Highway 5
- Carretera federal 5

Route information
- Maintained by Secretariat of Infrastructure, Communications and Transportation
- Length: 401 km (249 mi)

Major junctions
- North end: Near the Mexican border in Mexicali
- Fed. 2 in Mexicali; San Felipe
- South end: Jct. with Fed. 1

Location
- Country: Mexico
- State: Baja California

Highway system
- Mexican Federal Highways; List; Autopistas
← Fed. 3	→ Fed. 8

Federal Highway 5 (Spanish: Carretera Federal 5, Fed. 5) is a toll-free part of the federal highways corridors (Spanish: los corredores carreteros federales), and follows the northeast length of the state of Baja California from the US-Mexico border in Mexicali to the junction with Fed. 1. The highway is inside the Mexicali Municipality and the San Felipe Municipality. From San Felipe to the south, the road follows the seacoast of the Gulf of California until Chapala and the Jct. with Fed. 1

== Route description ==
The road begins in the border city of Mexicali near the western border crossing. It has four lanes from there for about km 80. At this point it becomes a two-lane highway (with little or no shoulder in most areas) until km 160, about 18 km (11 mi) south of the junction with Fed. 3, and about 40 km (24 mi) north of San Felipe. From there, the highway is a broad, divided, four-lane highway with a median and ample shoulders, until it ends in San Felipe.

The new highway improvement segments being constructed from San Felipe to the north and Mexicali to the south are on a raised base so that roadway dips caused by the natural undulation of the landscape, a form of drainage, are replaced by drainage culverts covered by the highway. Vehicles no longer have to ford storm water passing over the roadway. The resulting highway is less susceptible to erosion.

The interchange with Fed. 3 eliminates there the need for cross traffic driving.

== Earthquake damage and repairs ==
The epicentre (32°15'32"N, 115°17'13.2"W) of the magnitude 7.2 earthquake on April 4, 2010 (2010 Baja California earthquake) is about 3 km east of the highway. Repairs on the highway began nearly immediately. From km 20 to km 38, SCT (Secretaría de Comunicaciones y Transportes) contractors re-levelled the road and filled cracks.

The hurricanes in Sept & October 2018 have caused significant damage to the bridges south of San Felipe. Some bridges lost their entire roadway, while others have gaping holes at the abutments (ends) of the bridge. All these missing sections are bypassed using gravel detours. Some of these detours are short & easy, while others wind down canyons & cross the wash a hundred or more feet below the bridge. All are passable (slowly) in a passenger car in good weather. One crew was observed making the major repairs needed; one can assume it will be years before the repairs are complete.

== State highway condition ==
The state route that starts in San Felipe and continues to Chapala is a natural extension of Fed. 5. It is an undivided, two-lane highway that has some rough spots and has many significant dips or fords where the highway meets normally-dry steams. One of the largest is labelled on the road in both directions as the "OH SHIT DIP." As of September 2024, good pavement continues to the Fed. 1 at Chapala. It is passible by cars, motor homes and trucks.

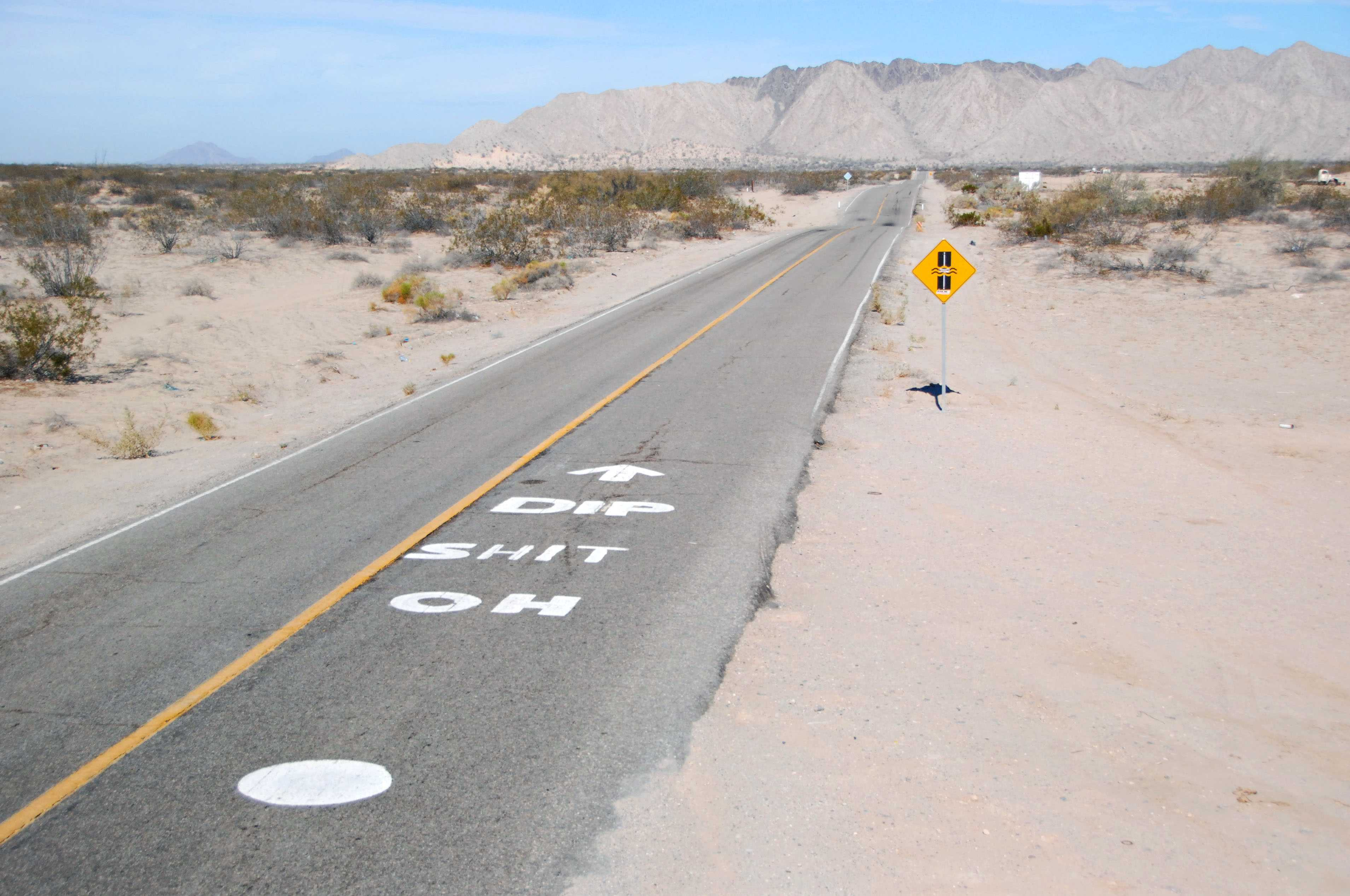
Road markings south of the dip with the vado to the north beyond on Fed. 5.

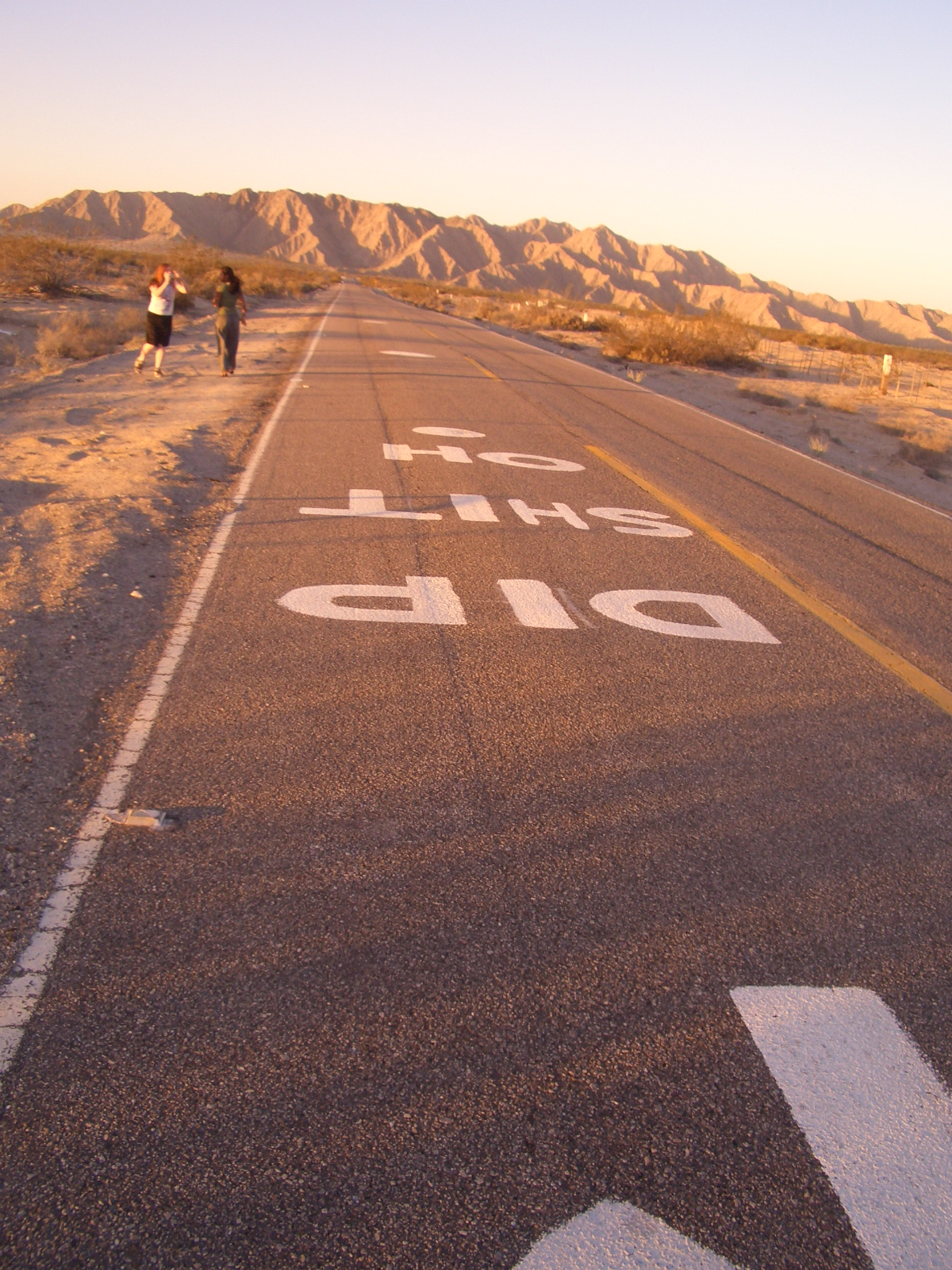
The markings on the other side of the road with only the mountains to the north in the background

== Major intersections ==
The entire route is in Baja California.

Municipality	Location	km	mi	Destinations	Notes
San Quintín	Chapala			Fed. 1 – Guerrero Negro, Lázaro Cárdenas	Southern terminus
San Felipe	No major junctions				
San Quintín	No major junctions				
San Felipe				Fed. 3 west – Ensenada, Tijuana	
Mexicali				SH 4 – Ejido Durango	Interchange
Mexicali	Colonia la Puerta			SH 10 – Ejido Nayarit	
Mexicali				SH 29 – Ejido Michoacán	
Mexicali	Ejido el Choropo			Fed. 2D – Ensenada, Tijuana	Interchange; no northbound exit
Mexicali	Mexicali			Calzada Héctor Terán Terán	Interchange
Mexicali	Mexicali			Fed. 2 – Tijuana	Interchange
Mexicali	Mexicali			To Autonomous University of Baja California	Interchange
Mexicali	Mexicali			Avenida Francisco I. Madero	Current northern terminus; access to Calexico West Port of Entry via Avenida Cristóbal Colón
Mexicali	Mexicali			SR 111 – Calexico	Former border crossing
1.000 mi = 1.609 km; 1.000 km = 0.621 mi: Closed/former; Incomplete access
