= Corredor Tijuana-Rosarito 2000 =

Highway in Mexico

Corredor 2000
- Carretera estatal 201
- Boulevard 2000

Route information
- Length: 42 km (26 mi)

Major junctions
- North end: Fed. 2D near Tijuana
- Fed. 2 in Tijuana; Fed. 1D near Rosarito Beach
- South end: Fed. 1 near Rosarito Beach

Location
- Country: Mexico
- State: Baja California

Highway system
- Mexican Federal Highways; List; Autopistas

Corredor Tijuana-Rosarito 2000, also Bulevar 2000, Boulevard 2000, Corredor 2000, is a freeway in northwestern Baja California connecting the Mesa de Otay area of eastern Tijuana with Rosarito Beach. 42 kilometres (26 mi) long, it runs along the southeastern edge of the developed area of metropolitan Tijuana and is considered a major infrastructure project in the state. The freeway was designed for traffic of 75,000 cars per day and to spur development of a half-million new residential units.

It starts from the Federal Highway 2D Tijuana-Mexicali when leaving the toll booth. It runs through the entire east and south side of the city, then there is an intersection with Federal Highway 2 Tijuana-Mexicali, and ends at the Federal Highway 1 Rosarito-Ensenada near Rosarito Beach.

In 2011, the Baja California state government approved MXN 10,000,000 (USD 555,556) for improvements to bridges and to repair storm damage.
