= El Cajon Boulevard =

Road from San Diego to La Mesa, California, US

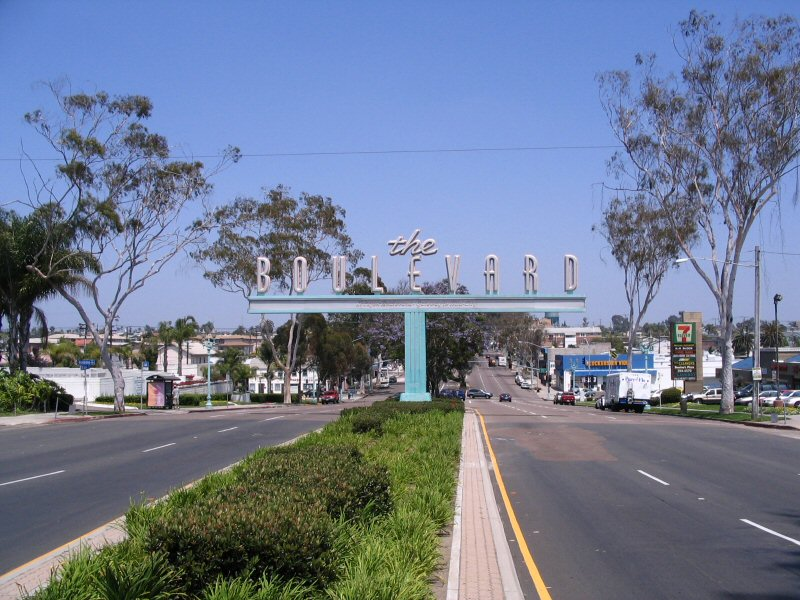
- El Cajon Boulevard near west end
- Part of: I-8 BL
- Tourist routes: Historic US 80
- Location: San Diego County, California, United States
- West end: Normal Street in San Diego
- Major junctions: I-805 in San Diego; SR 15 in San Diego; I-8 in La Mesa; I-8 in El Cajon
- East end: Main Street in La Mesa

El Cajon Boulevard is a major east–west thoroughfare through San Diego, La Mesa and El Cajon, California. Before the creation of Interstate 8 it was the principal automobile route from San Diego to El Cajon, the Imperial Valley, and points east as U.S. Route 80; it is now signed as a business loop of Interstate 8.

== Route description ==
The boulevard now consists of two disconnected portions, one in San Diego and La Mesa, and the other in El Cajon. The central section through La Mesa's Grossmont Pass was built over by Interstate 8. It has been cited as a prime example of a commercial strip whose growth and development was shaped by the automobile, as opposed to the parallel University Avenue commercial strip whose growth was shaped by the trolley.

== History ==
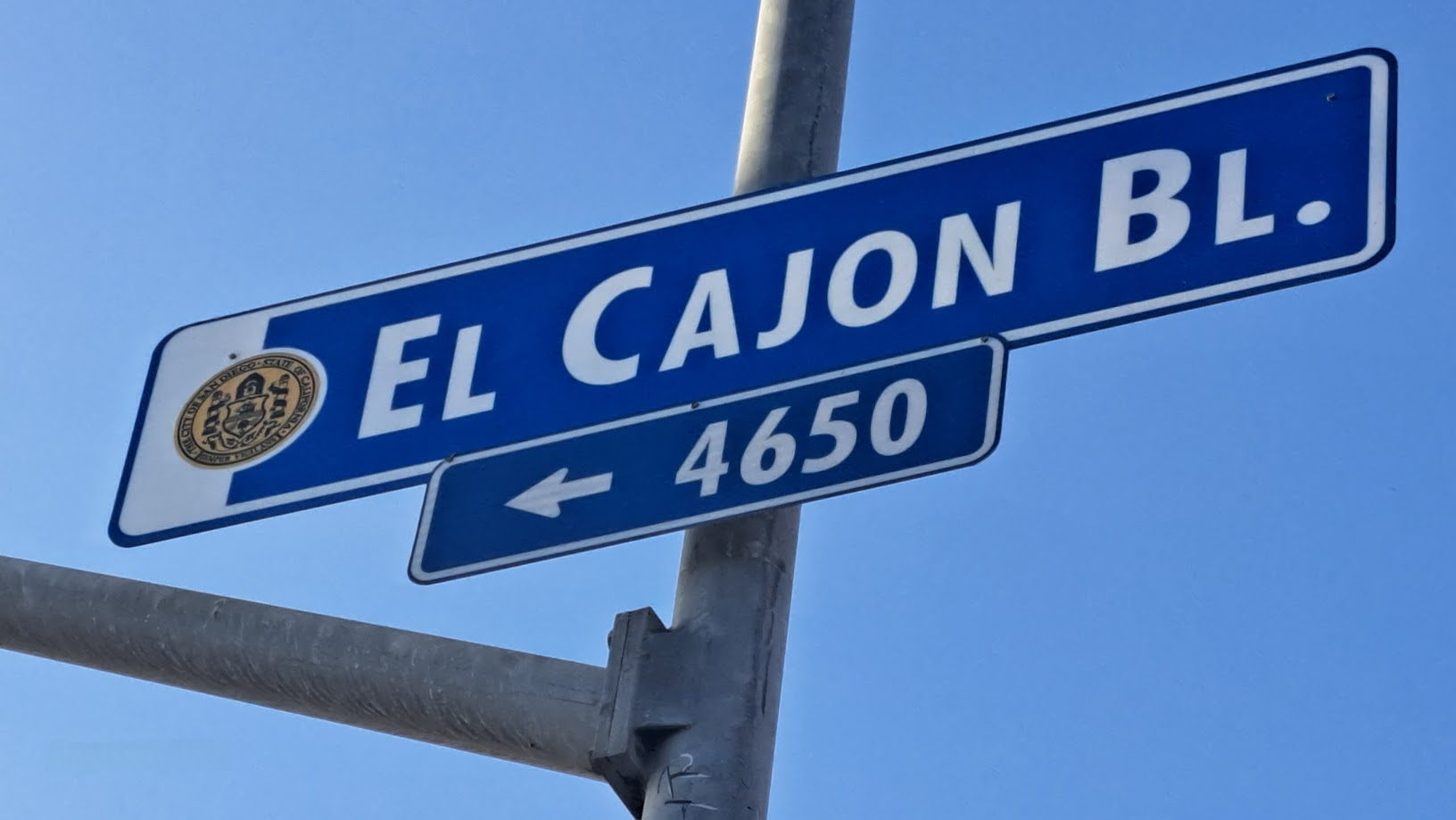

It was formerly part of U.S. Route 80, and became a business loop for Interstate 8 when U.S. Route 80 was decommissioned and replaced by the interstate. It is designated as a historic highway by the state of California. Only portions of what would become El Cajon Boulevard in both La Mesa and El Cajon were originally part of US 80. During a re-routing through San Diego onto Park Boulevard in 1929, the western portion of El Cajon Boulevard was added to US 80. The next section of El Cajon Boulevard added to US 80 was between La Mesa and El Cajon around 1940.

The State Theatre opened in 1940. Designed by architect S. Charles Lee. The building possessed a 125 foot spiral tower with a blinking beacon on top that could be seen for miles, interior murals illuminated in blacklight and colorful terrazzo sidewalks out front. The theatre was demolished in 1987.

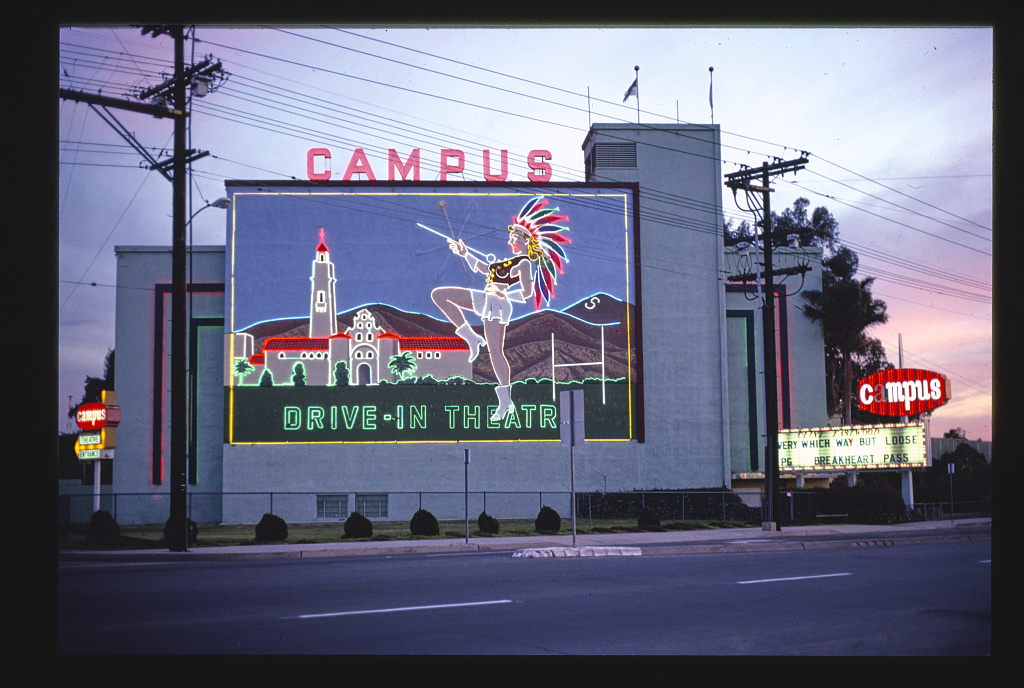
Historic Campus Drive-In Theater at intersection with College Avenue

In 1947, the Campus Drive-In movie theater opened at College Avenue and El Cajon Boulevard. The signage on the back of the screen included a mural made of 1900 feet of neon.

The first Jack in the Box restaurant was opened at 6270 El Cajon Boulevard by Robert O. Peterson in 1951. The site had originally been a drive-in diner called "Topsy's", later renamed "Oscar's" after Peterson's middle name, which was a classic drive-in where food was served by carhops to patrons in the parking lot. Jack in the Box was the first drive-through, with the innovation of a two-way intercom that allowed one car to place an order while another car was being served. Other restaurants had previously offered drive-up window service, but Jack in the Box was the first major chain to make drive-through windows the focus of its operation.

Today, most of the route from La Mesa to El Cajon has been overlaid by I-8. The final part of El Cajon Boulevard to receive the US 80 designation was a small piece between Park Boulevard and Normal Street in the late 1940s early 1950s when US 80 was re-routed off Park Boulevard onto the new Cabrillo Freeway. US 80 ceased to exist legislatively within California after July 1, 1964.

The street was the site of the El Cajon Boulevard Riot in August 1960, also known as the Drag Strip Riot, considered one of the first major youth riots of the 1960s. In the latter part of the 20th century, El Cajon Boulevard developed an unsavory reputation as a hotspot for prostitution.

In 1961, an employee at the Campus Drive-In pulled a knife on a patron named Dennis O'Connor and stabbed him to death. The employee was found guilty of manslaughter. O'Connor's family sued the Campus Drive-In Corporation and lost. Because of this incident, his father became locally famous as president of the San Diego Court Watchers Association, and his sister Maureen O'Connor became the youngest person to win a seat on San Diego City Council, and later becoming the first female mayor of the city.

On June 6, 1963, President John F. Kennedy rode in an open "bubble car" in a motorcade headed east on El Cajon Boulevard on his way to give a commencement speech and receive an honorary degree at San Diego State College.

In the 1970s, El Cajon Boulevard was covered in neon signs that were associated with a seedy atmosphere. In 1985, a large Neon majorette wearing an Indian headdress associated with the San Diego State Aztec mascot was preserved by the Save Our Neon Organization, and moved further south at the College Grove Shopping Center in Oak Park. Smaller reproductions of the neeon majorette were used as signage at the shopping center that replaced the drive-in.

In 2008 and 2009, the Voice of San Diego and KPBS reported that El Cajon Boulevard was part of a circuit of west coast cities where prostitution would move around to avoid warrants and arrests. After the interstate shifted traffic away from the boulevard, businesses suffered and it became a "hotspot" for vice and illegal sex traficking.

In 2015, a new YMCA facility at the intersection with Fairmount Road opened up on land donated by philanthropist Robert Price. Dedicated to serving community members in City Heights, Talmadge and Kensington, disparate economic, ethnic and cultural differences of people who live on either side of El Cajon Boulevard were exposed.

In 2020, a dedicated bus-only lane intended to improve traffic congestion and increase public transportation use was established as part of San Diego's "Climate Action Plan" along three miles of the Boulevard in 2020.

== Business Districts ==
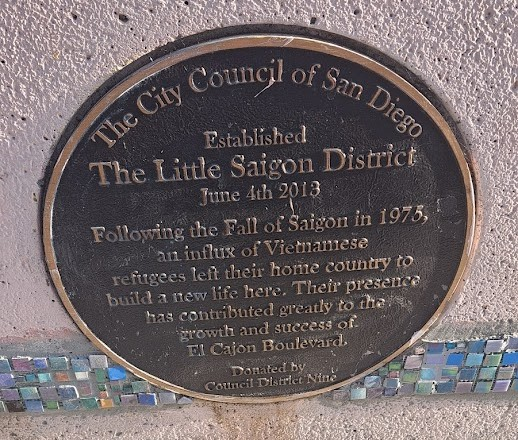
Little Saigon Monument, City Heights, corner of Menlo Ave

The El Cajon Boulevard Business Improvement Association was formed in 1988 to improve physical and economic conditions along the 60 blocks of the boulevard between Park Boulevard and 54th Street. The association installed a large "The Boulevard" sign (see photo) to document the street's importance.

The College Area Business District was formed in 1996 and covered the area east of 54th Street to 73rd Street in La Mesa. They hosted the annual Halloween "Boulevard BOO! parade" on the Boulevard in Rolando from 2004 to 2019.

A six-block section from Euclid to Highland avenues was officially designated the Little Saigon Cultural and Commercial District in 2013. The mission of the Little Saigon San Diego Foundation is to "revitalize the densely populated Vietnamese business district of El Cajon Boulevard."

== Major intersections ==
The entire route is in San Diego County.

Location	mi	km	Destinations	Notes
San Diego	0.00	0.00	Park Boulevard / Normal Street	Western terminus of western segment
San Diego	1.2	1.9	I-805 (Jacob Dekama Freeway)	I-805 exit 16
San Diego	2.1	3.4	SR 15 (Escondido Freeway) / Boulevard Transit Plaza to I-15 Centerline Station	SR 15 exit 5B; future I-15
La Mesa	7.2	11.6	Baltimore Drive to I-8 west	
La Mesa	7.3– 7.5	11.7– 12.1	Center Street	Interchange; no eastbound exit
La Mesa	7.6	12.2	I-8 west – San Diego	Eastern terminus of western segment; I-8 exit 13A
Gap in route
El Cajon	10.0	16.1	I-8 east – El Centro	Western terminus of eastern segment; I-8 exit 15
El Cajon	11.3	18.2	Main Street / Douglas Avenue – Downtown	Eastern terminus of eastern segment
1.000 mi = 1.609 km; 1.000 km = 0.621 mi: Concurrency terminus

== Points of interest ==
- Copley Price YMCA, 4300 El Cajon Blvd
- Historic State Theatre, 4712 El Cajon Blvd
- HItching Post Motel, Guava Ave & El Cajon Blvd

West to East:

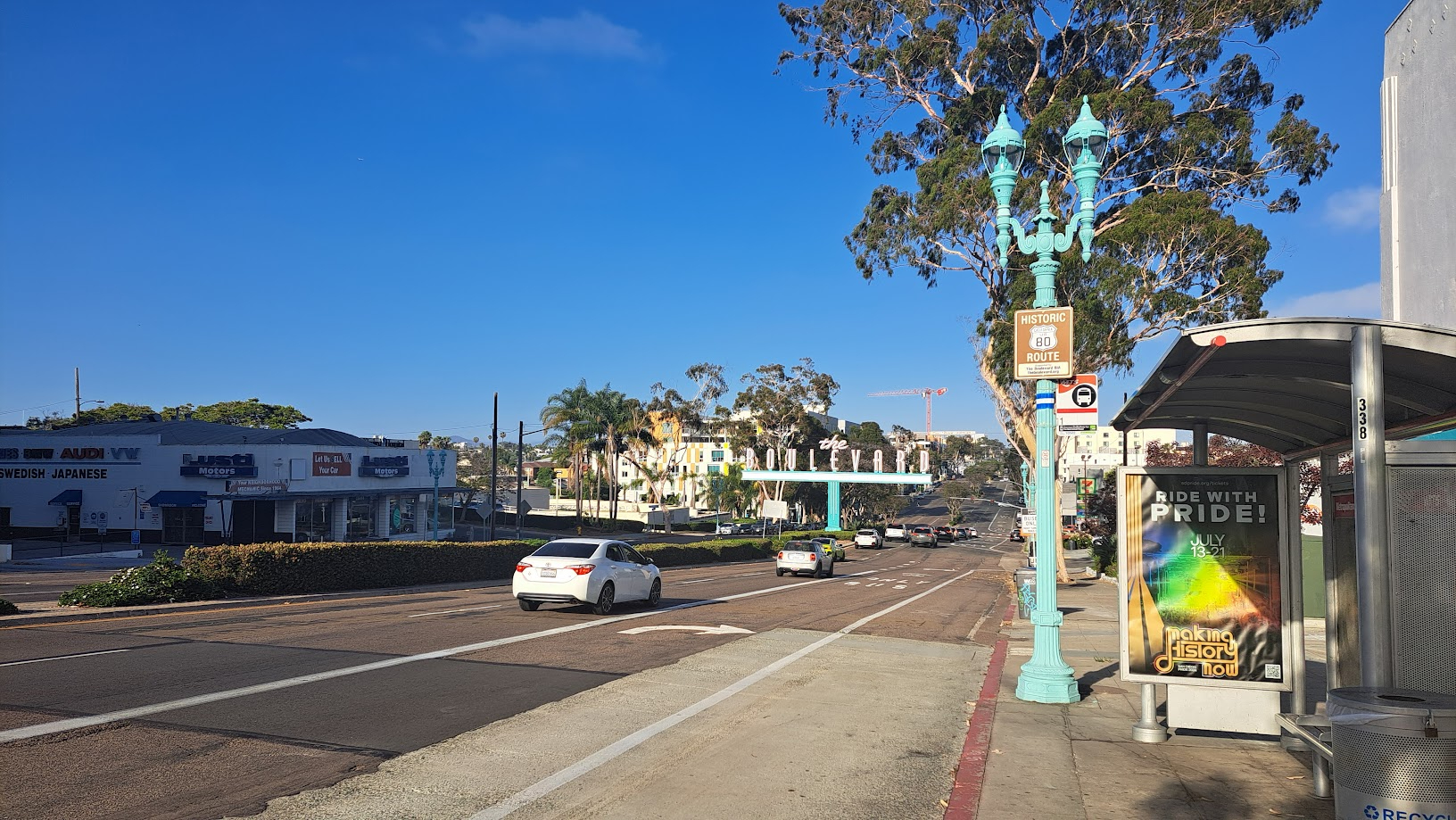
Park and El Cajon Boulevard in University Heights

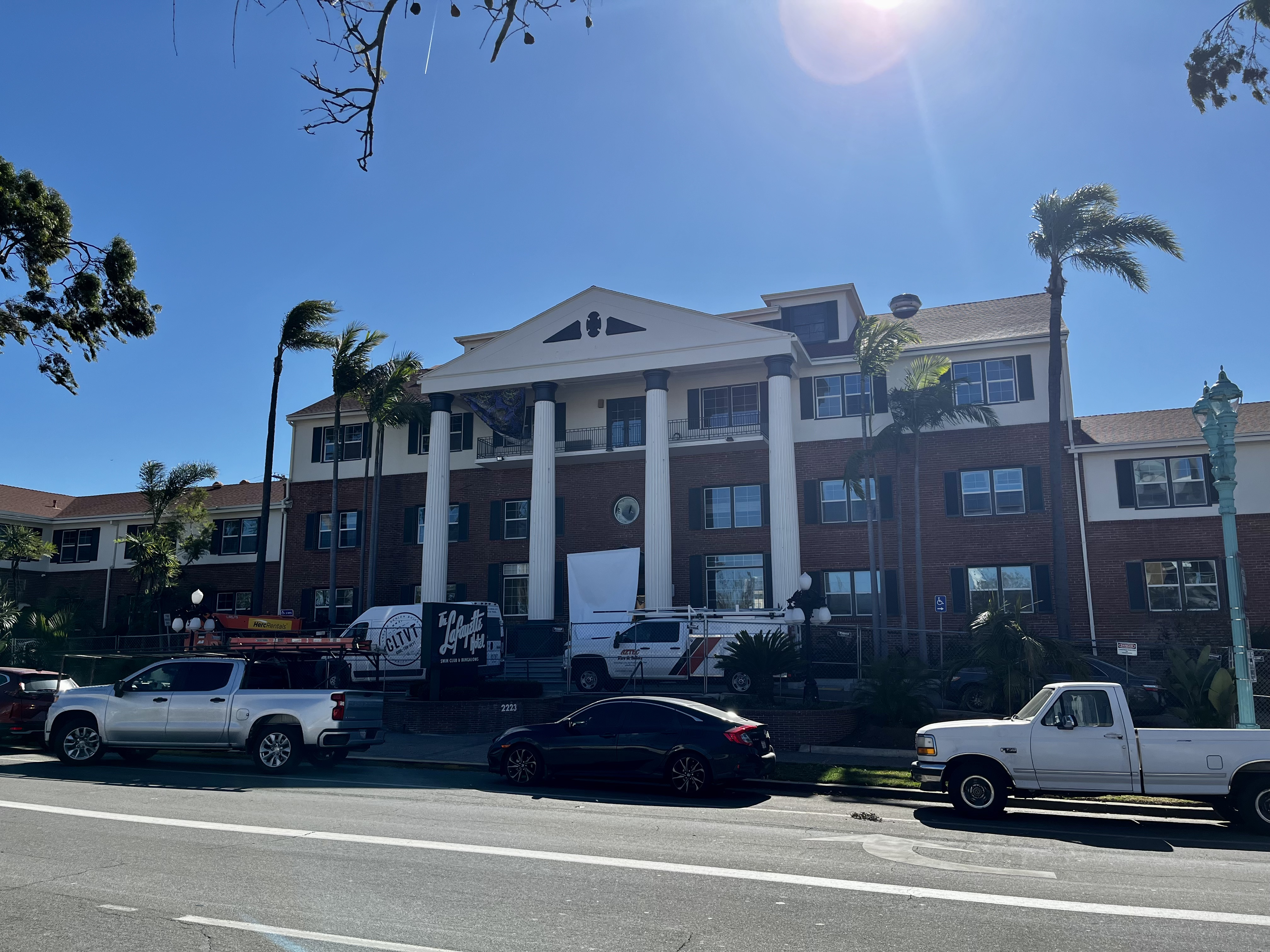
Lafayette Hotel in North Park, 2200 Block

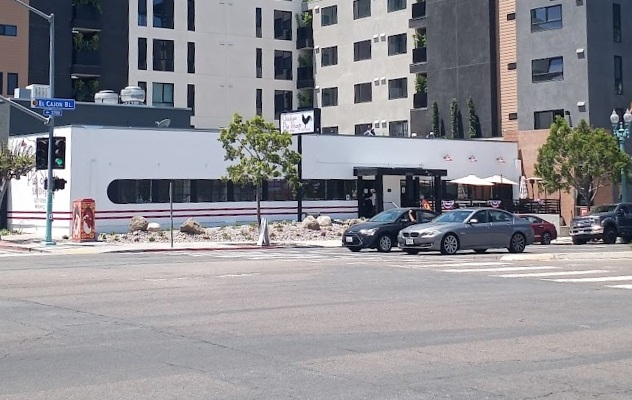
Chicken Pie Shop, 2600 Block

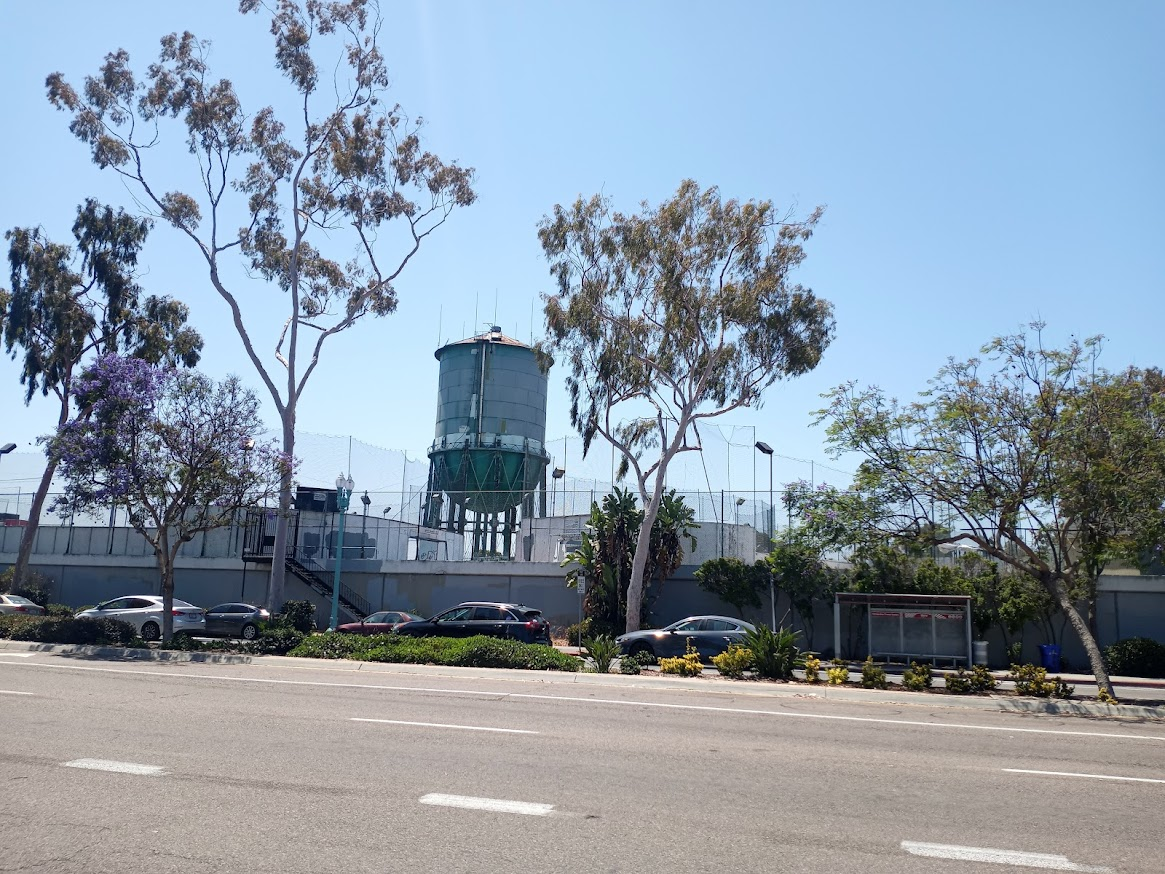
North Park Water Tower

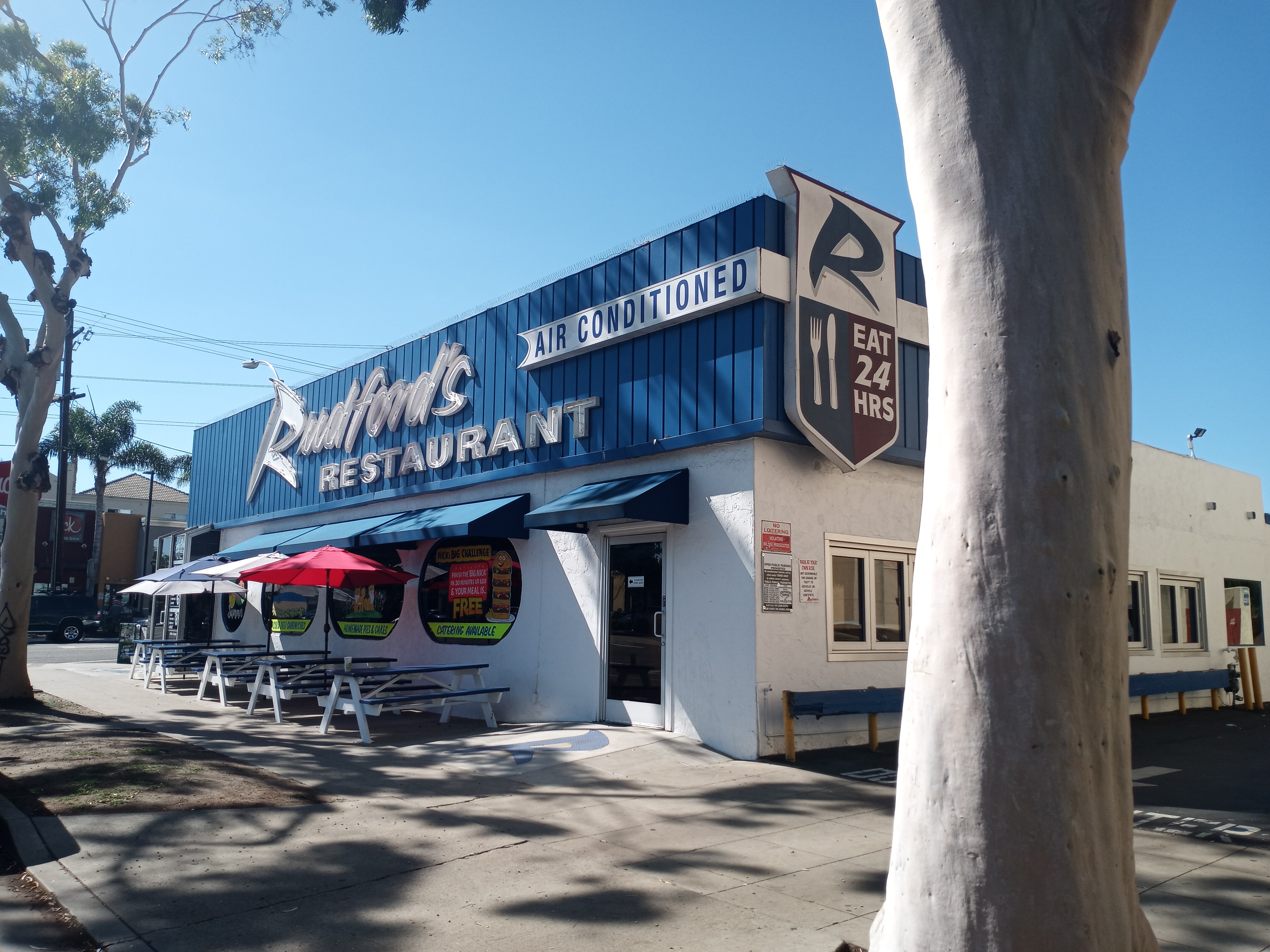
Rudford's Restaurant in 2023, 2900 Block

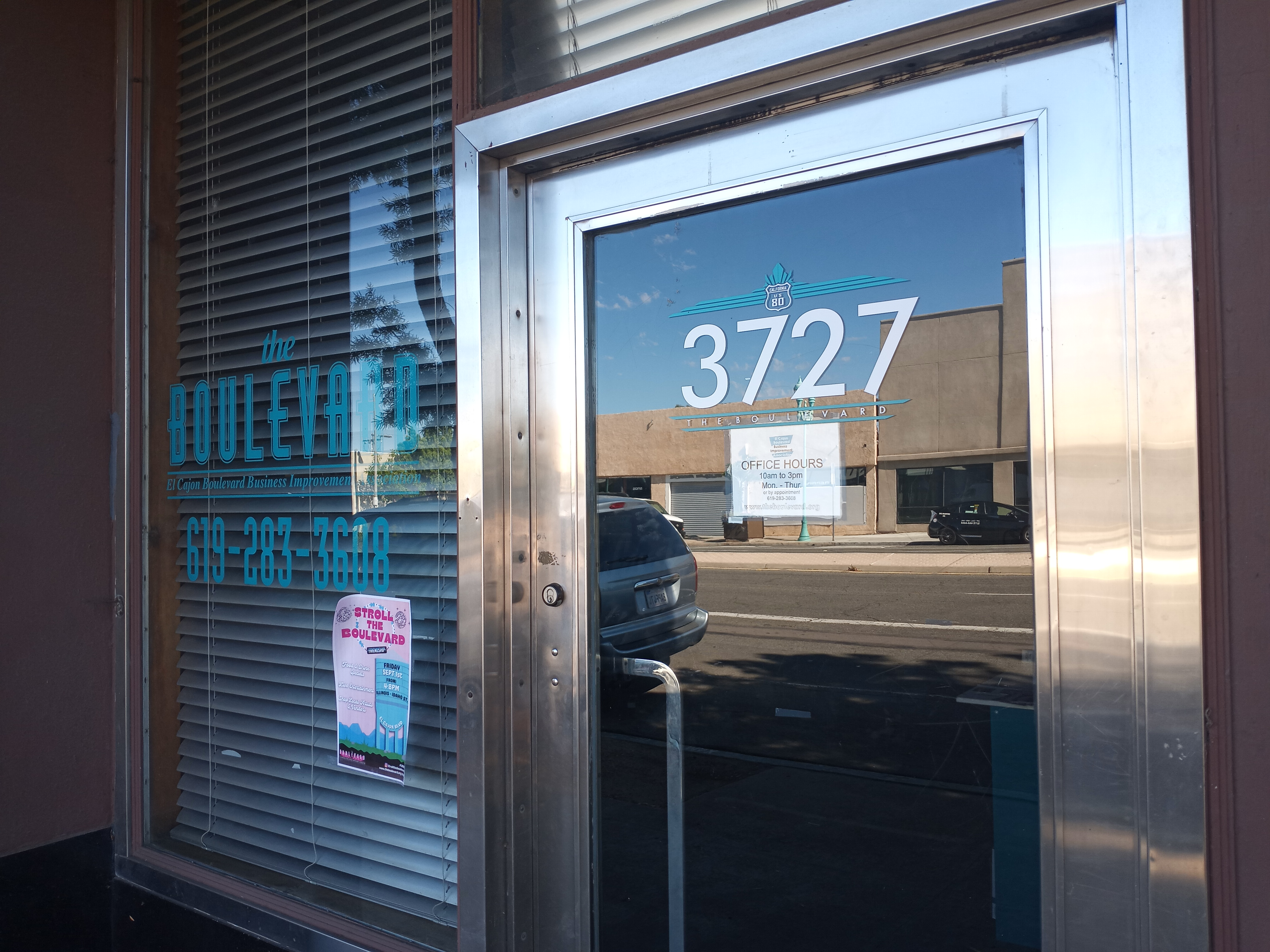
El Cajon Boulevard Business Improvement District Offices, 3700 Block

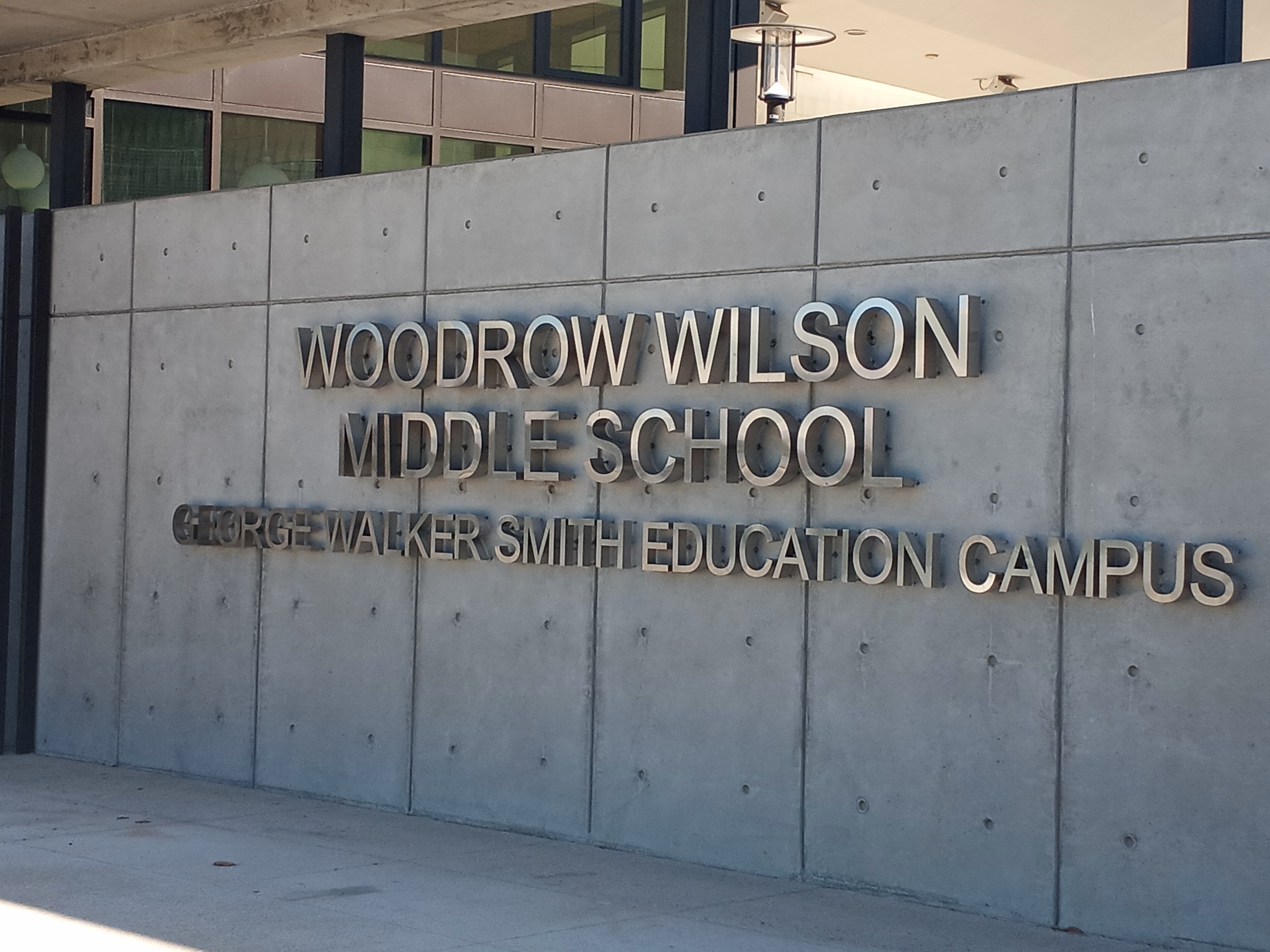
Woodrow Wilson Middle School in North Park, 3800 Block

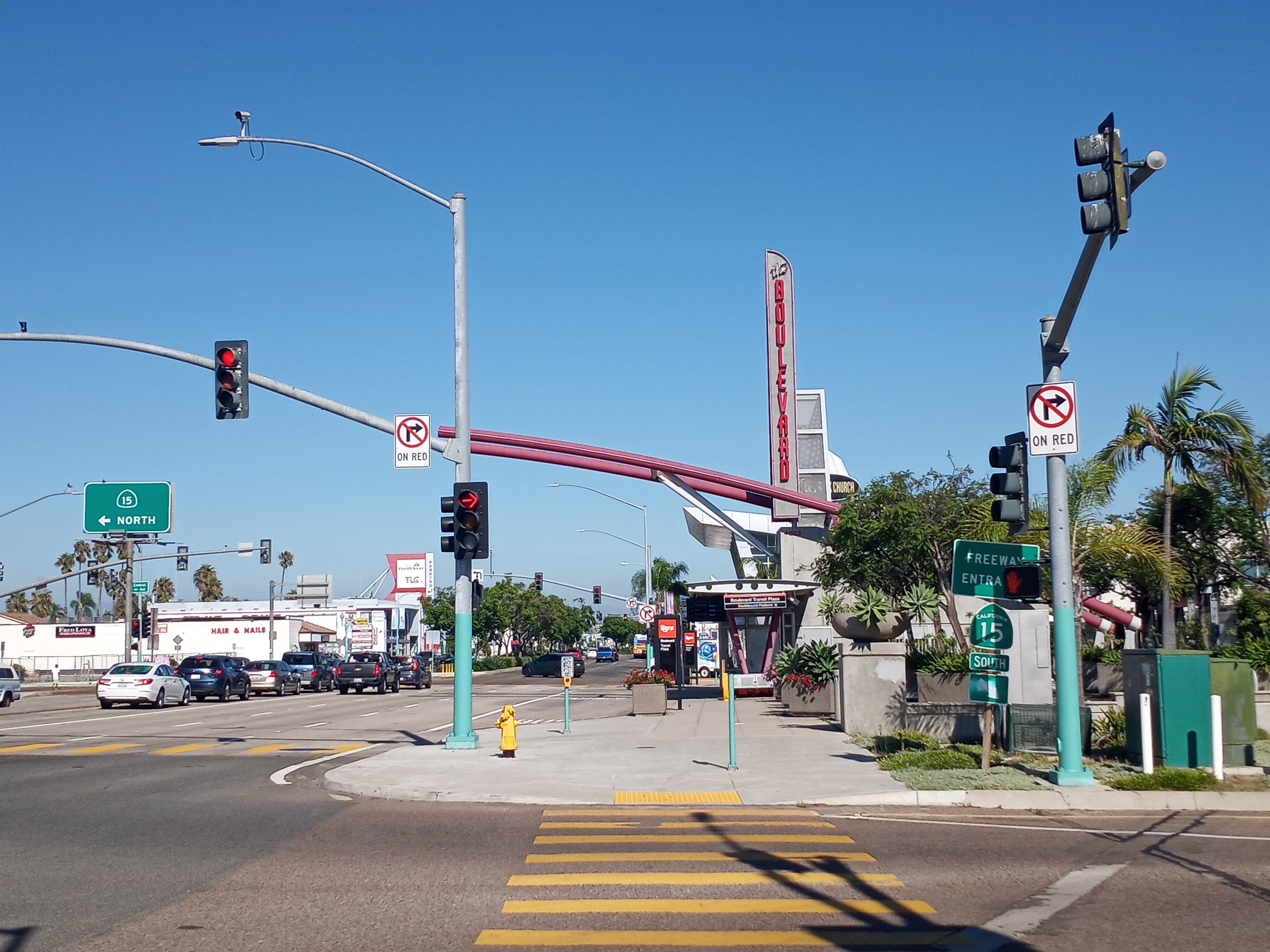
Boulevard Transit Plaza at the intersection of I-15, 3900 Block

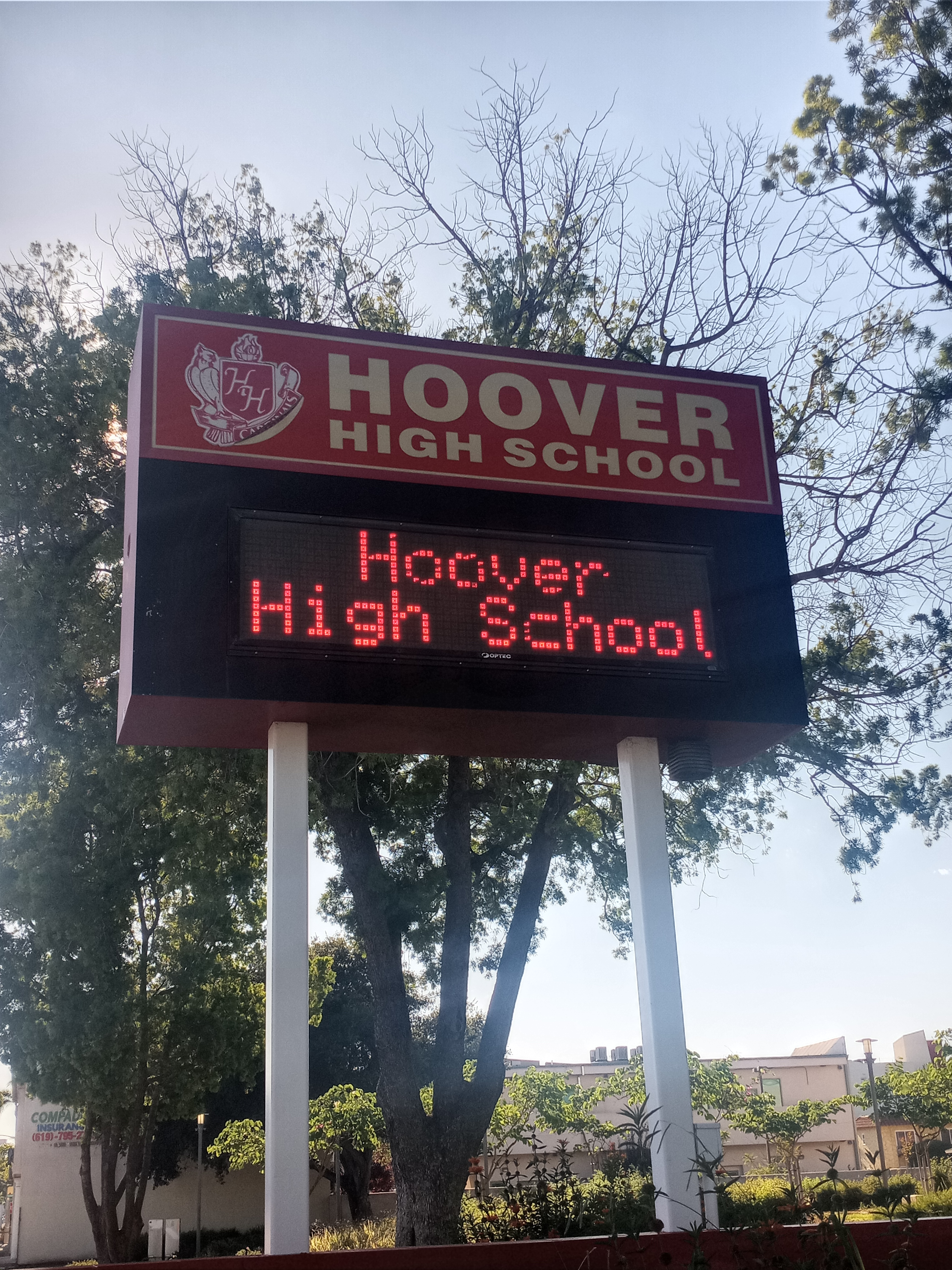
Hoover High School, 4400 Block

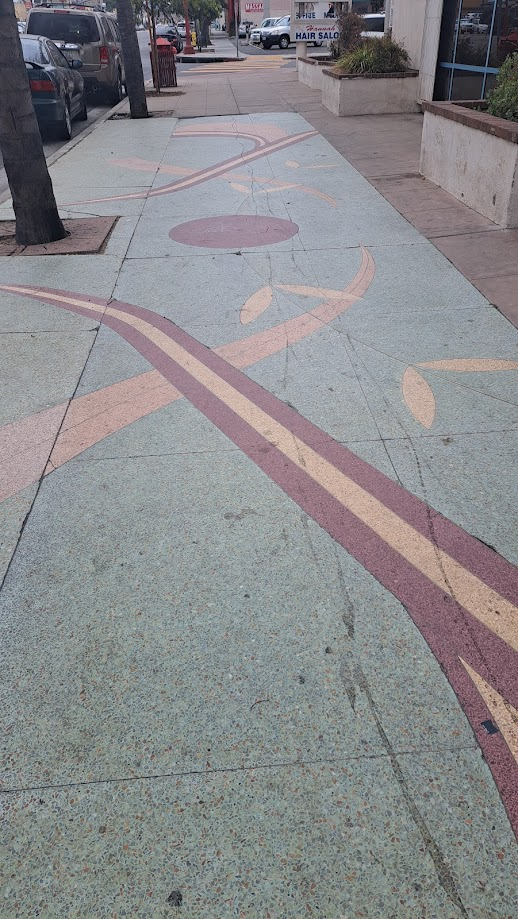
Historic Terrazzo sidewalks, 4712 El Cajon Boulevard

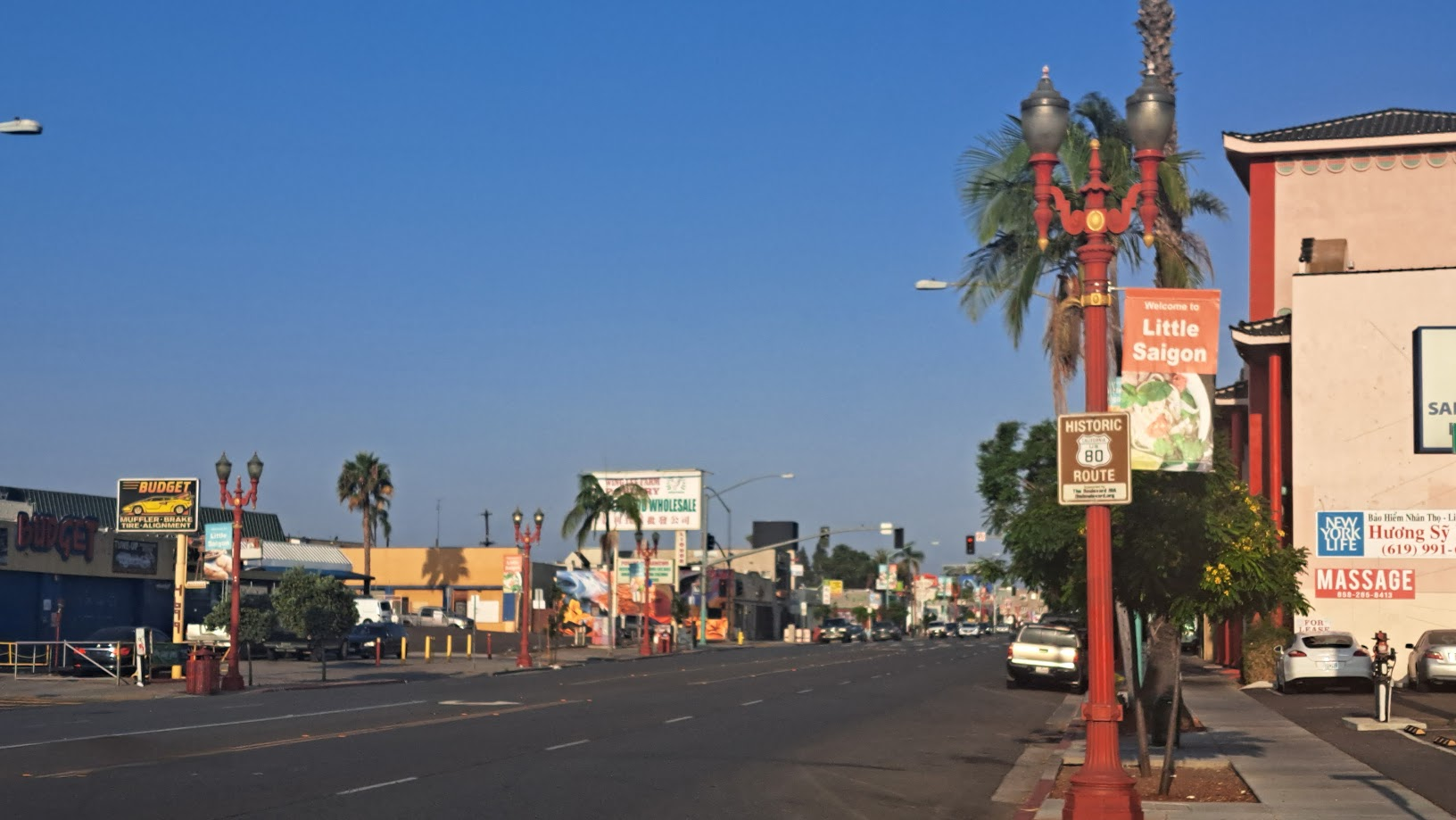
4700 Block

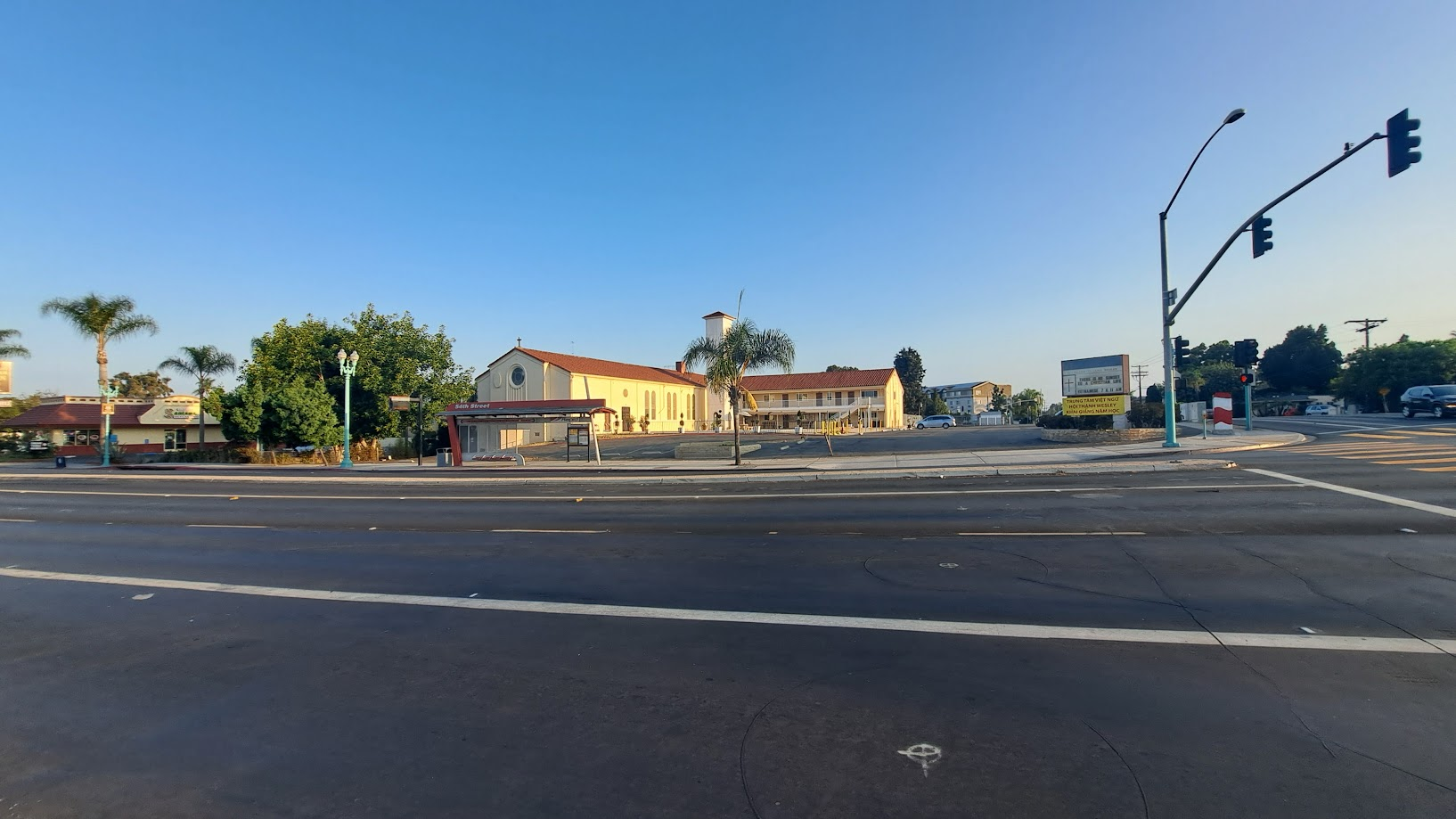
Wesley United Methodist Church, 5300 Block

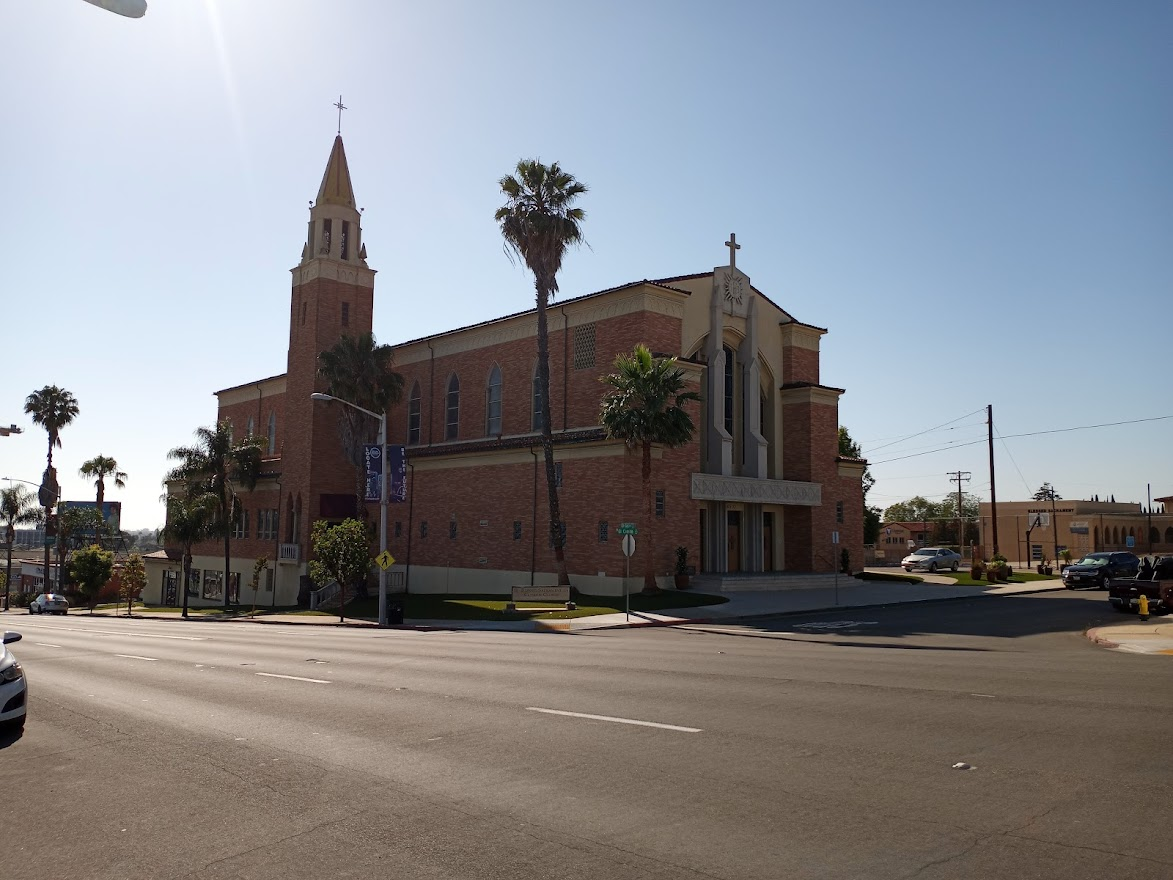
Blessed Sacrament Catholic Church: College Area Business District signs hang from the streetlight in front.

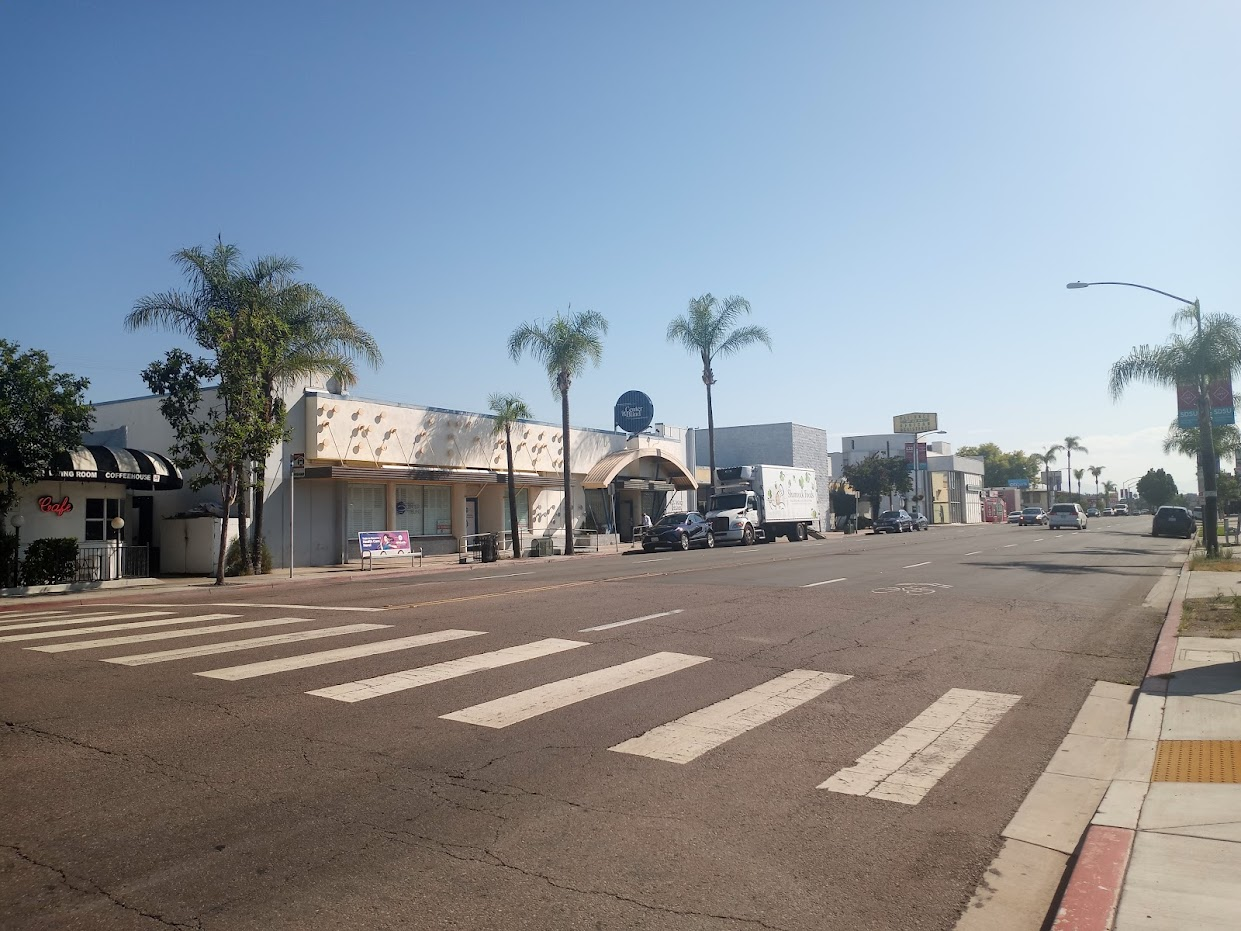
San Diego Center for the Blind, 5900 Block

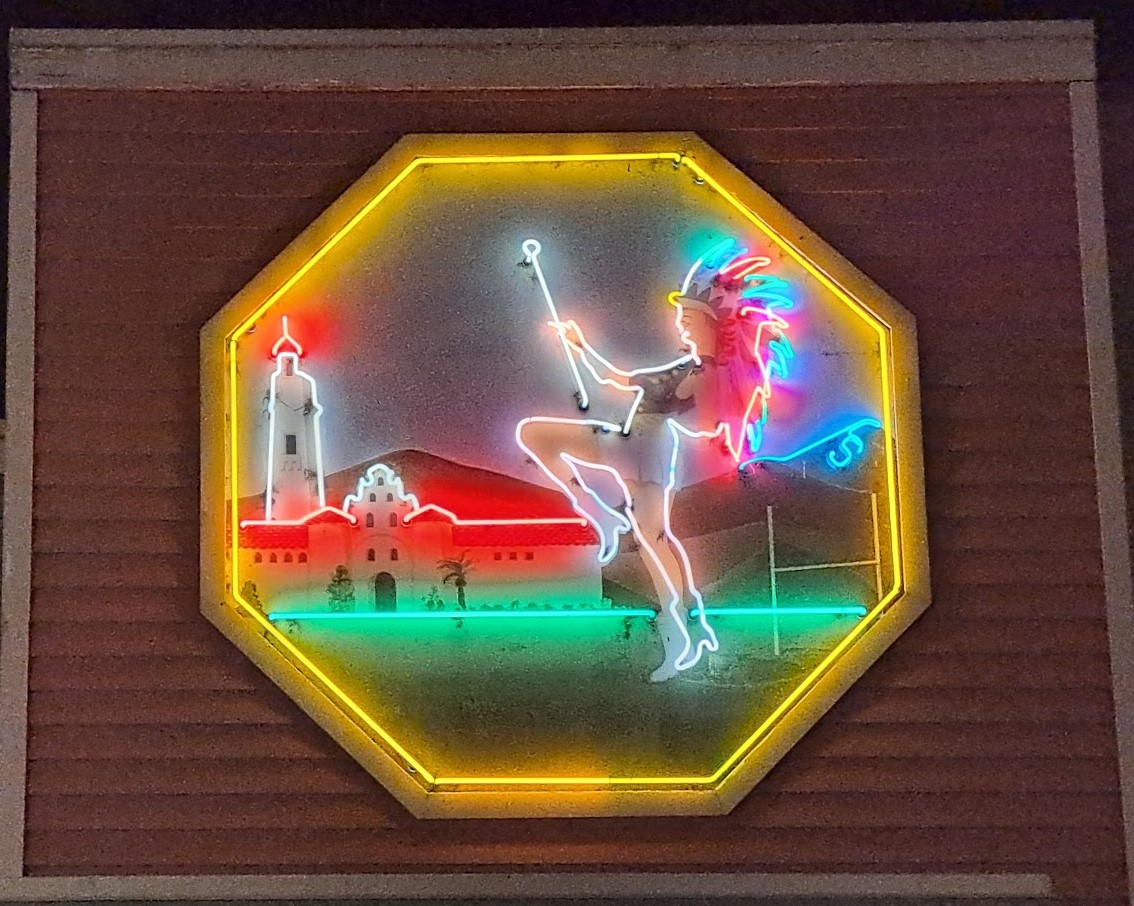
Neon Aztec Majorette Sign in 2023, Campus Plaza Shopping Center

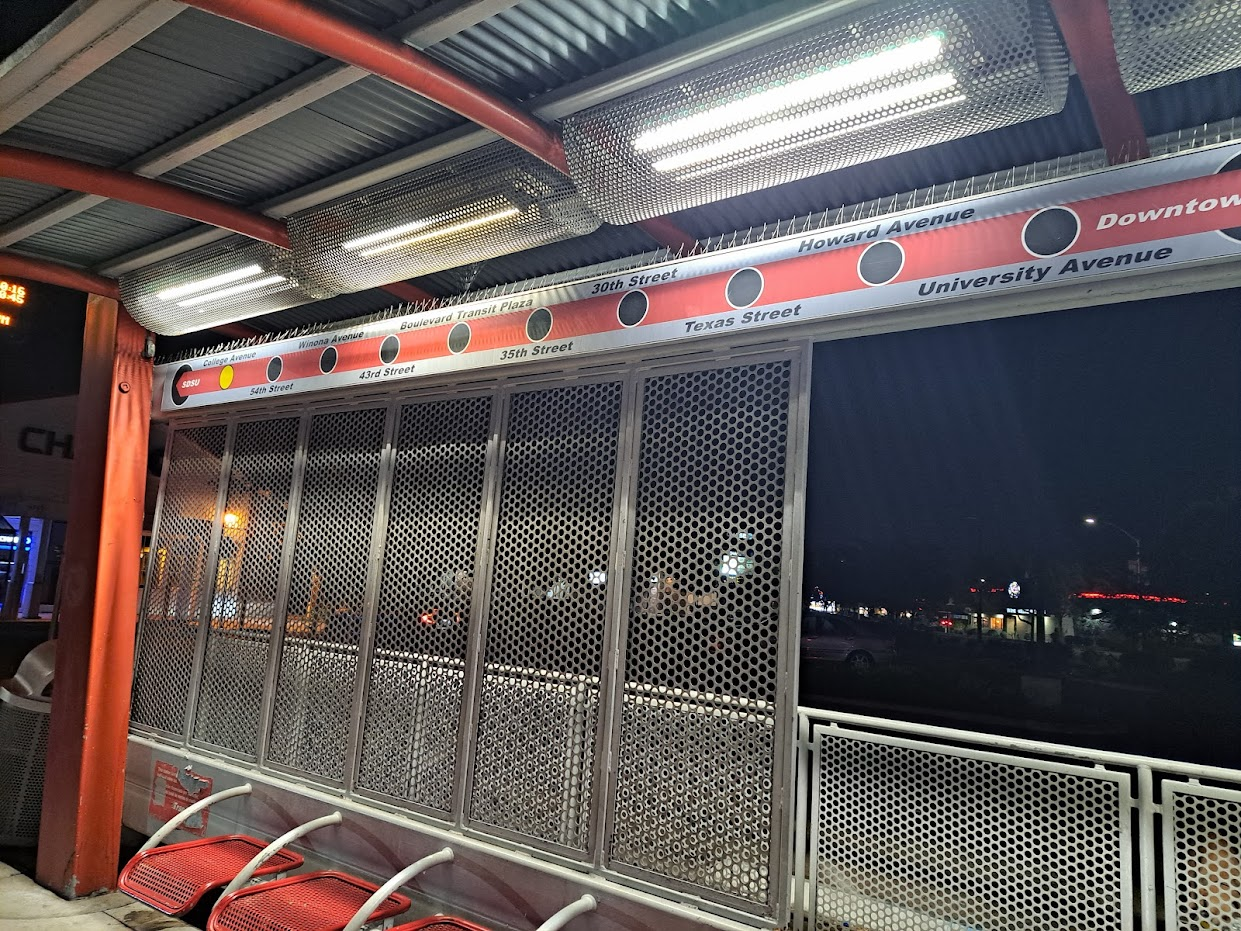
215 Rapid Bus Stop - Marked stops on El Cajon Boulevard include College Avenue, 54th Street, Winona Avenue, 43rd Street, Boulevard Transit Plaza, 35th Street, 30th Street, and Texas Street.

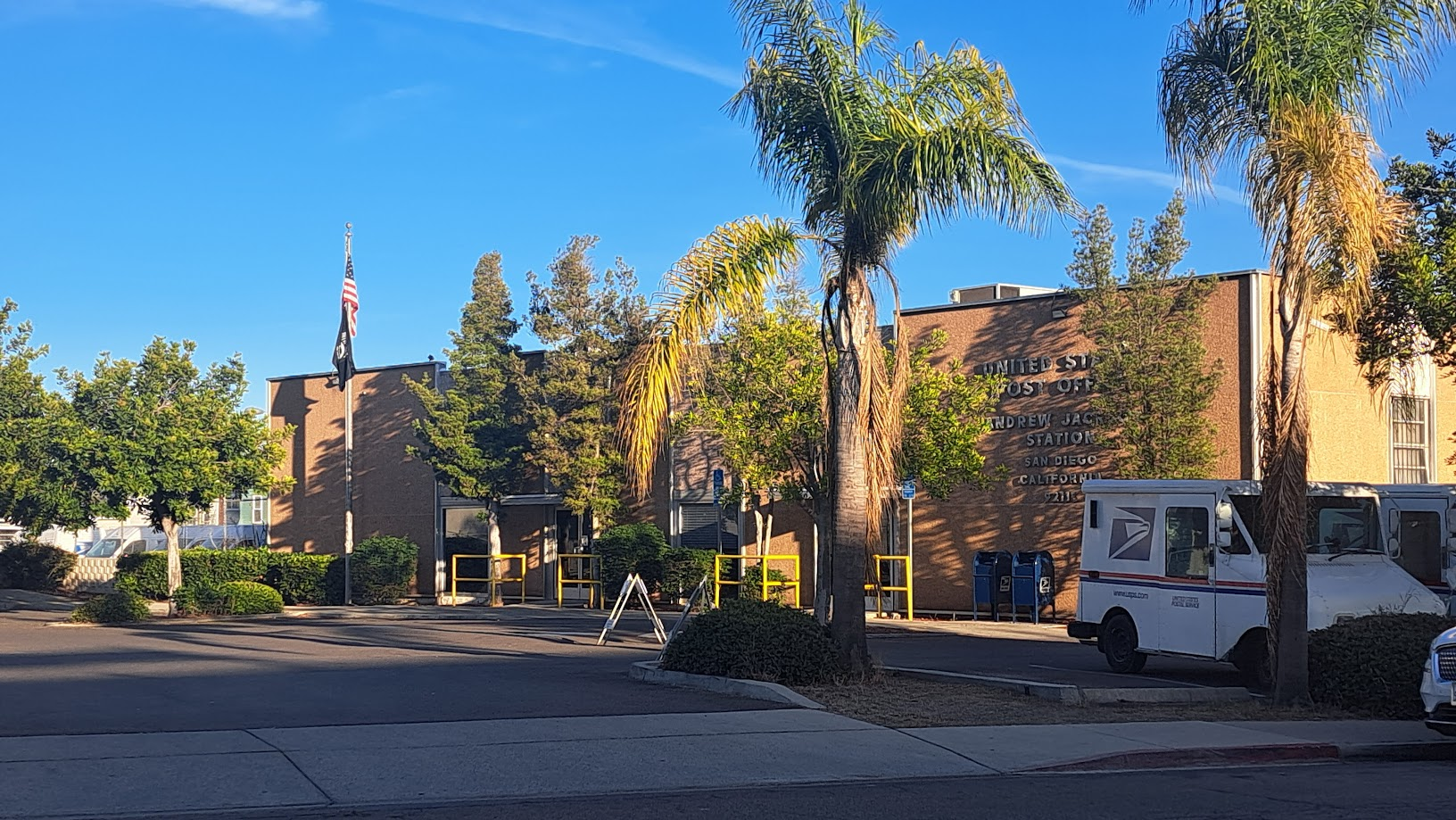
The Susan Davis Post Office, 6400 Block

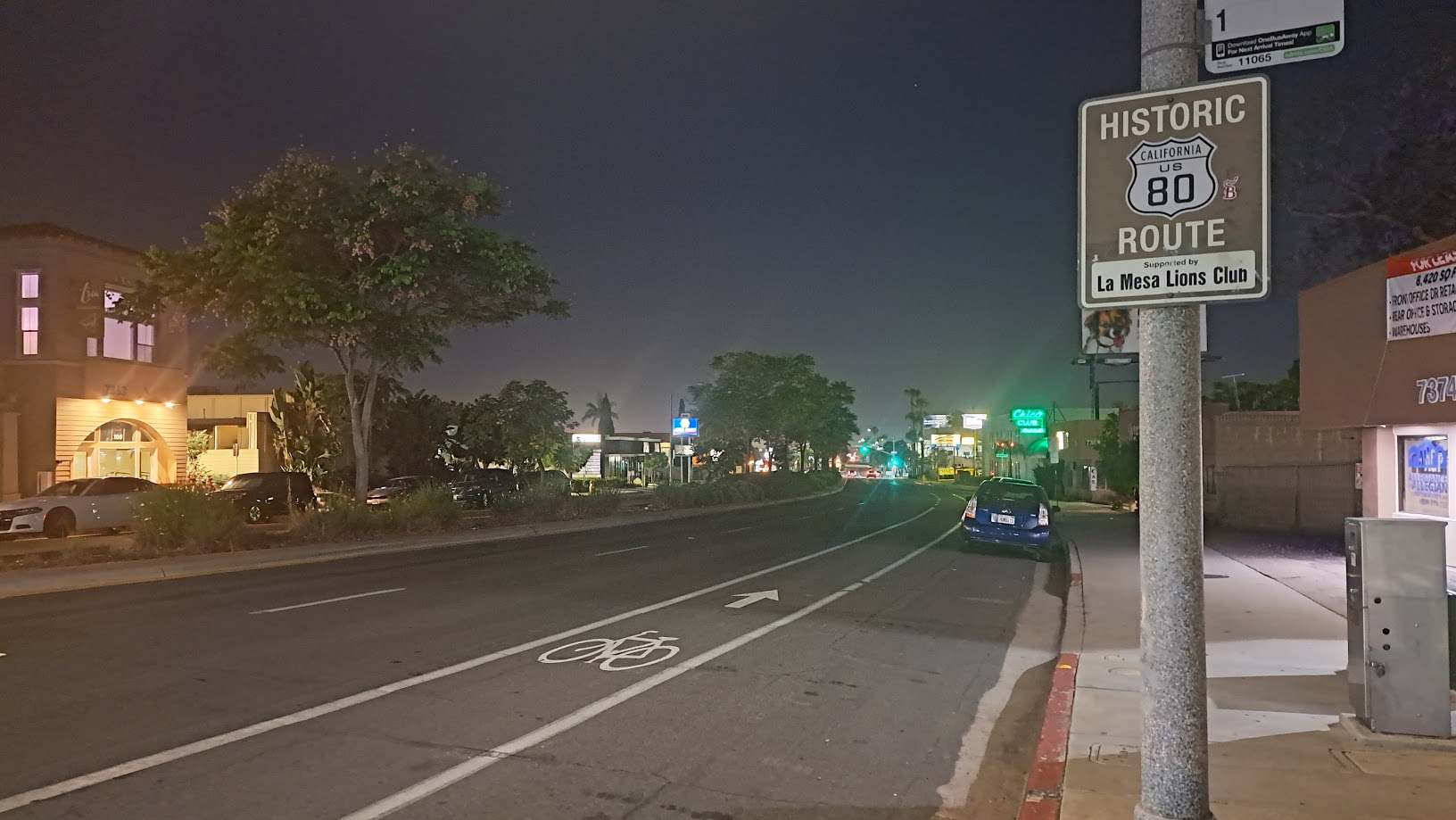
El Cajon Boulevard & Keeney St, 7300 Block
