= Mexican Federal Highway 2 =

Highway in Mexico

Federal Highway 2
- Carretera federal 2
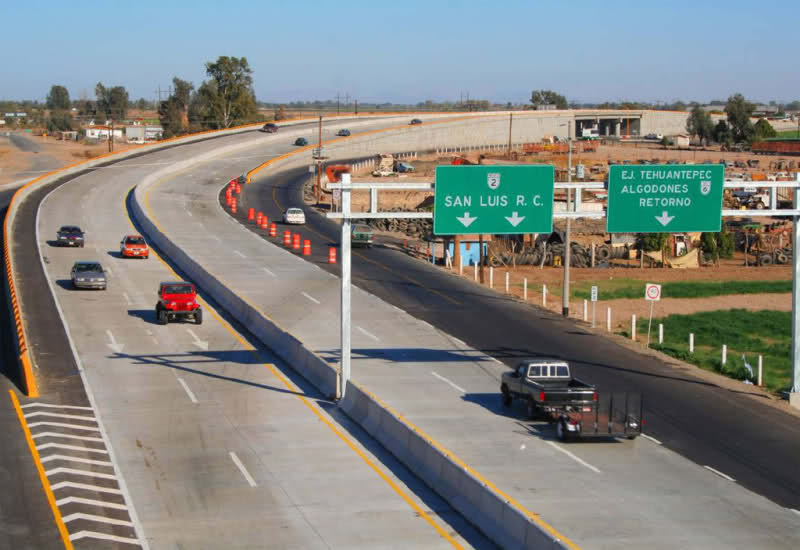

Route information
- Maintained by Secretariat of Communications and Transportation
- Length: 1,987.34 km (1,234.88 mi)

Western segment
- Length: 1,343.14 km (834.59 mi)
- West end: Fed. 1 in Tijuana
- Major intersections: Fed. 15 in Santa Ana; Fed. 15 in Imuris; Fed. 45 in Ciudad Juárez
- East end: FM 1088 at the Fort Hancock – El Porvenir International Bridge

Eastern segment
- Length: 644.20 km (400.29 mi)
- West end: Spur 349 at the Lake Amistad Dam International Crossing
- Major intersections: Fed. 57 in Piedras Negras; Fed. 85 in Nuevo Laredo; Fed. 30 in Nueva Ciudad Guerrero; Fed. 54 in Ciudad Mier; Fed. 40 in Reynosa; Fed. 101 / Fed. 180 in Matamoros
- East end: Playa Lauro Villar at the Gulf of Mexico

Location
- Country: Mexico
- States: Baja California, Sonora, Chihuahua, Coahuila, Nuevo León, Tamaulipas

Highway system
- Mexican Federal Highways; List; Autopistas
← Fed. 1D	→ Fed. 2D

Federal Highway 2 (Spanish: Carretera Federal 2, Fed. 2) is a toll-free part of the Mexican federal highway corridors (los corredores carreteros federales) that runs along the U.S. border. The highway is in two separate improved segments, starting in the west at Tijuana, Baja California, on the Pacific coast and ending in the east in Matamoros, Tamaulipas, on the Gulf of Mexico. Fed. 2 passes through the border states of Baja California, Sonora, Chihuahua, Coahuila, Nuevo Leon and Tamaulipas. It has a total length of 1,987 kilometres (1,235 mi); 1,343 kilometres (835 mi) in the west and 644 kilometres (400 mi) in the east.

Fed. 2 has a connection to all official ports of entry into the United States, with the exception of the international bridge between Ojinaga, Chihuahua, and Presidio, Texas, which is between the two highway segments. These ports of entry allow road access to the four border states of the United States: California, Arizona, New Mexico, and Texas. As a result, customs inspection stations are common along some stretches of the highway.

Both segments of Fed. 2 are located entirely within the "Hassle Free Zone", which is the zone where a temporary import permit is not required for foreign vehicles. Tourist cards are only required to be obtained by tourists traveling on Fed. 2 between Sonoyta, Sonora, and Cananea, Sonora. The rest of Fed. 2 can be traveled without obtaining a tourist card as long as the stay does not last longer than 72 consecutive hours.

== Route description ==
Lengths
	km	mi
Western segment
B.C.	244.03	151.63
Son.	745.79	463.41
Chih.	353.32	219.54
Segment total	1,343.14	834.59
Eastern segment
Coah.	204.02	126.77
N.L.	24.00	14.91
Tamps.	416.18	258.60
Segment total	644.20	400.29
Total	1,987.34	1,234.88

Fed. 2 is divided into two discontinuous segments. The western segment begins in Tijuana, Baja California, and terminates at El Porvenir, Chihuahua, near Ciudad Juárez. The eastern segment begins at Ciudad Acuña, Coahuila, and continues to the Gulf of Mexico at Playa Bagdad, Tamaulipas, in Matamoros.

Between Tijuana and Mexicali in Baja California, and again between Reynosa and Matamoros in Tamaulipas, the route is bypassed by Fed. 2D, a four-lane controlled-access toll road referred to in Mexico as an autopista. Fed. 2 is considered to be part of Pacific Coastal Highway from Tijuana to Fed. 15 in Sonora.

Fed. 2 passes through the border states of Baja California, Sonora, Chihuahua, Coahuila, Nuevo León, and Tamaulipas. The highway also has connecting access to every official port of entry into the United States with the exception of the international bridge between Ojinaga, Chihuahua, and Presidio, Texas, which is within the gap between the two highway segments. These ports of entry enable access from the highway to all four United States border states: California, Arizona, New Mexico, and Texas. As a result, customs inspection stations are common along some sections of the highway.

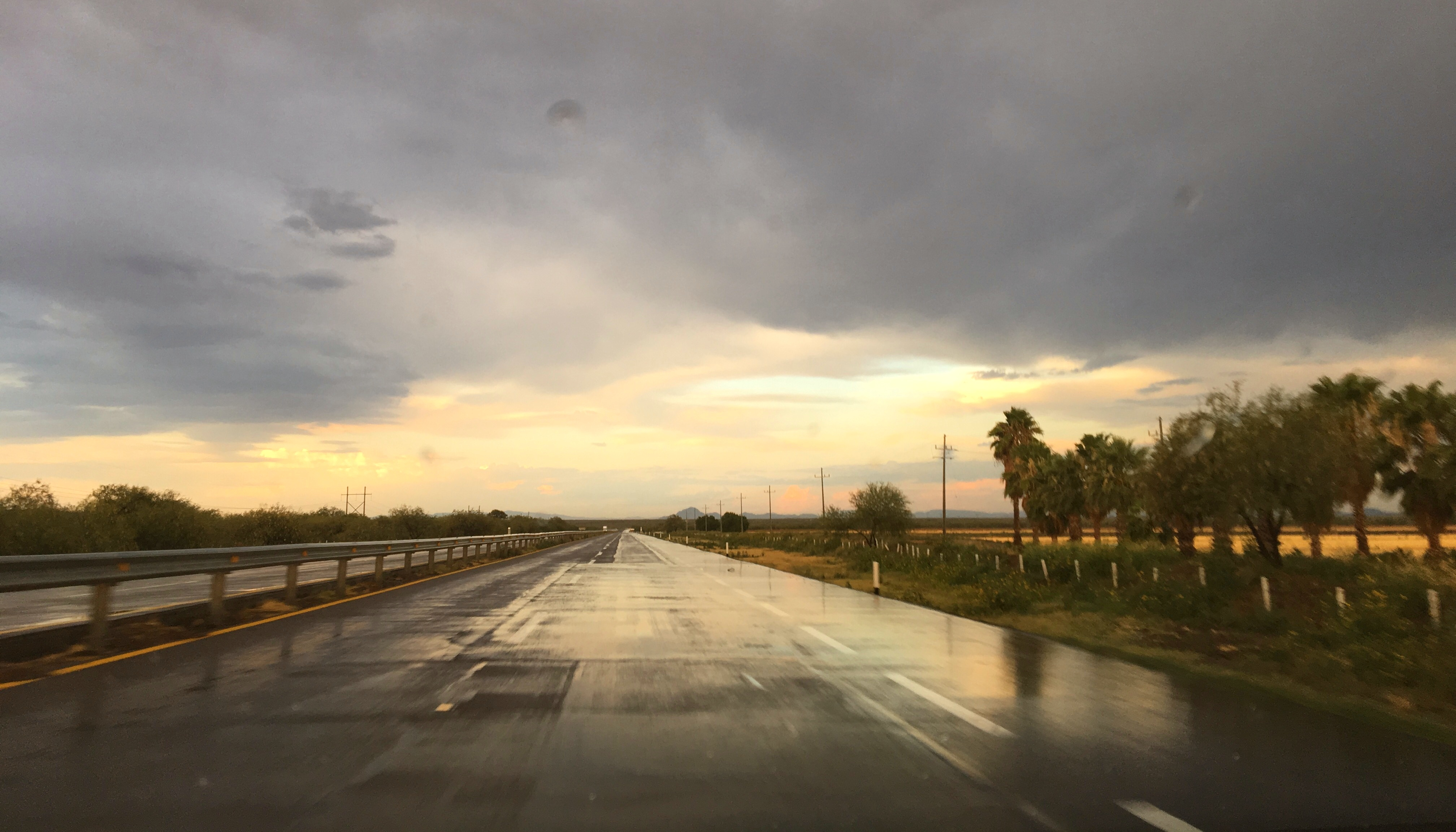
Eastbound Fed. 2 just outside Altar, Sonora, after a summer rain

The joining of the separate improved segments would not decrease travel time as the route follows the course of the Rio Grande (Río Bravo del Norte) around the Big Bend region of Texas. The gap between the two is more directly crossed by traveling along Interstate 10 and U.S. Highway 90 in the United States.

== Major intersections ==
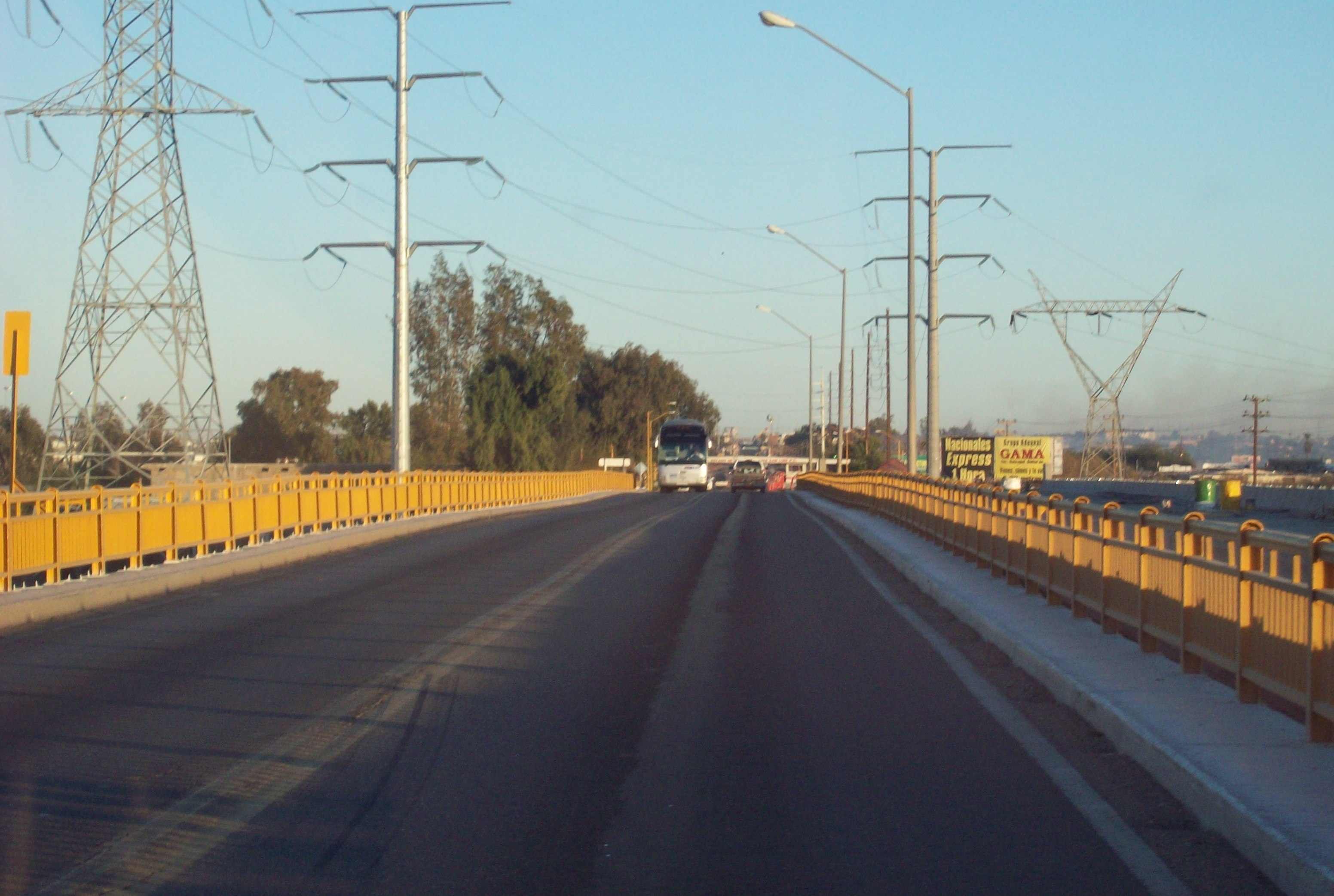
Colorado Bridge, a toll bridge over the Colorado River connecting the states of Baja California and Sonora

=== Western segment ===
- The western terminus of this segment is at Fed. 1 in Tijuana, Baja California.
- Corredor Tijuana-Rosarito 2000 in eastern Tijuana
- Fed. 3 in Tecate
- Fed. 5 in Mexicali
- Fed. 8 in Sonoyta, Sonora
- Fed. 15 south in Santa Ana
- Fed. 15 north in Imuris
- Fed. 17 in Agua Prieta
- Fed. 10 in Janos, Chihuahua
- Fed. 45 in Ciudad Juárez
- The eastern terminus of this segment is in El Porvenir at the Fort Hancock–El Porvenir International Bridge, which connects to FM 1088 at Fort Hancock, Texas.

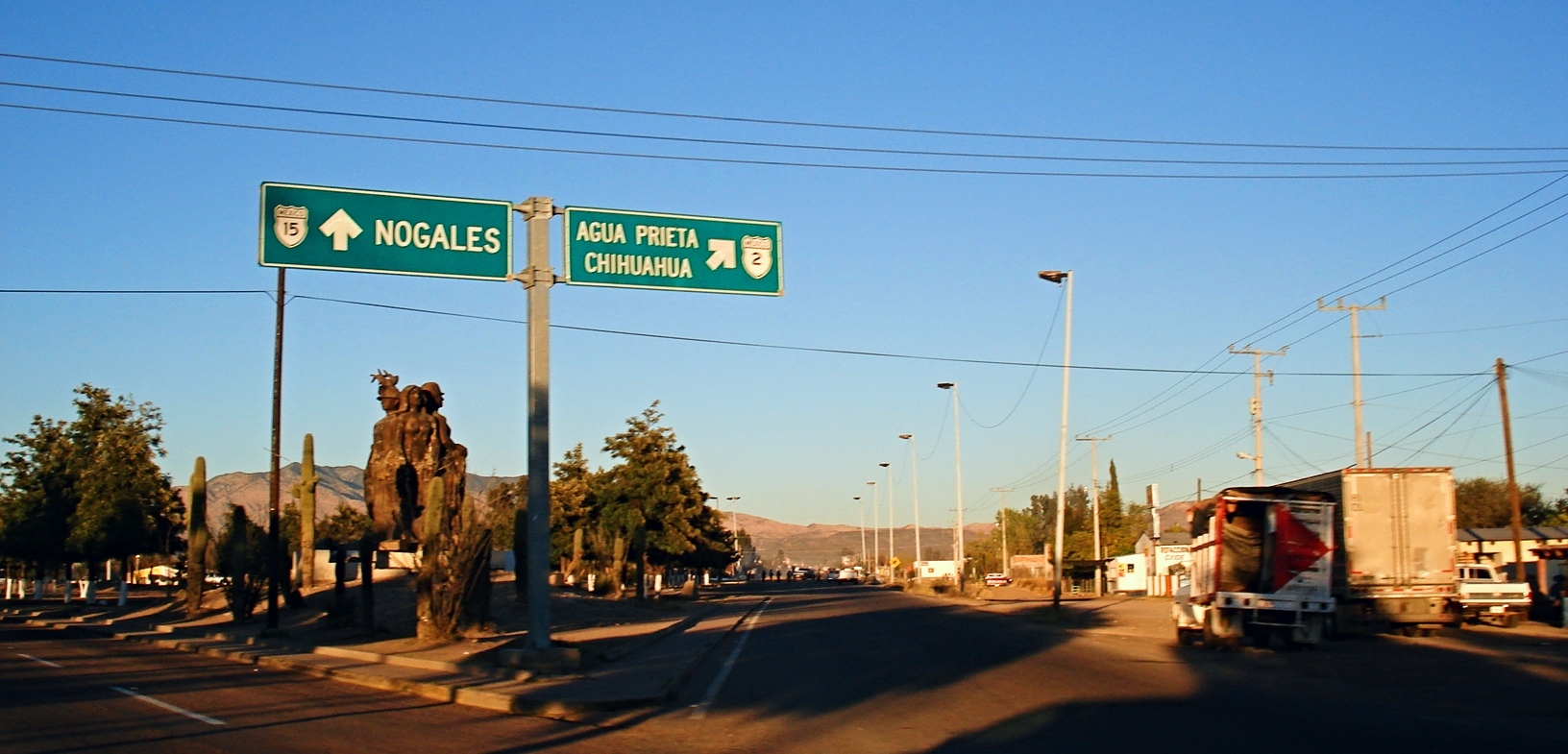
The junction between Federal Highways 2 and 15 in rural Imuris, Sonora. Fed. 2 travels east towards Agua Prieta and Ciudad Juarez while Fed. 15 continues northward towards the U.S.-Mexican border crossing in Heroica Nogales, Sonora.

=== Eastern segment ===
- The western terminus of this segment is in Ciudad Acuña at the Lake Amistad Dam International Crossing, which connects to Spur 349 at Del Rio, Texas.
- Fed. 29 in Ciudad Acuña
- Fed. 57 in Piedras Negras
- Fed. 85 in Nuevo Laredo, Tamaulipas
- Fed. 30 in Nueva Ciudad Guerrero
- Fed. 54 in Ciudad Mier
- Fed. 40 in Reynosa
- Fed. 97 in Reynosa
- Fed. 101 / Fed. 180 in Matamoros
- The eastern terminus of this segment is at Playa Lauro Villar on the Gulf of Mexico.

== See also ==
- List of Mexican autopistas
- List of Mexico–United States border crossings
- List of crossings of the Rio Grande
