= Mexican Federal Highway 3 =

Highway in Mexico

Federal Highway 3
- Carretera federal 3

Route information
- Maintained by Secretariat of Infrastructure, Communications and Transportation

Major junctions
- North end: SR 188 at the US-Mexico border
- Fed. 2 in Tecate, Baja California; Fed. 1 in Ensenada
- South end: Fed. 5 in El Chinero, Baja California

Location
- Country: Mexico
- State: Baja California

Highway system
- Mexican Federal Highways; List; Autopistas
← Fed. 2D	→ Fed. 5

Federal Highway 3 (Spanish: Carretera Federal 3, Fed. 3 ) is a tollfree part of the federal highway corridors (Spanish: los corredores carreteros federales). One segment connects Tecate (and California State Route 188 on the US-Mexico border) to Ensenada in Baja California. This segment ends at its junction with Fed. 1 at El Sauzal Rodriguez, just a little north of Ensenada. This segment of the highway is 112 kilometers (70 mi) long.

This segment of the highway is important because it shortens the distance between the Baja California peninsula and the interior of the country by providing a link with Fed. 2 bypassing Tijuana. It also connects Valle de Guadalupe, San Antonio de las Minas and Valle de Las Palmas.

A second segment of the highway, 196 kilometres (122 mi), begins at Fed. 1 in Ensenada and links Ensenada with Fed. 5 near the east coast of the Baja California peninsula. Their junction in the town of El Chinero is 55 kilometres (34 mi) north of San Felipe, Baja California. There is a military inspection station just south of the junction, where all passing vehicles in both directions are subject to search.
