= Mexican Federal Highway 2D =

Toll highway in Mexico

Federal Highway 2D
- Carretera federal 2D
- Autopista Mexicali–Tijuana; Autopista Santa Ana–Altar; Autopista Matamoros–Reynosa

Route information
- Maintained by Secretariat of Communications and Transportation

Major junctions
- West end: Fed. 1D at Mexico City
- Fed. 15D at Mexico City
- East end: Fed. 15D at the same time of highways at Mexico City

Location
- Country: Mexico

Highway system
- Mexican Federal Highways; List; Autopistas
← Fed. 2	→ Fed. 3

Federal Highway 2D (Spanish: Carretera Federal 2D, Fed. 2D) is a part of the federal highways corridors (Spanish: los corredores carreteros federales), and is the designation for toll highways paralleling Mexican Federal Highway 2. Seven road segments are designated Highway 2D, all but two in the state of Baja California, providing a toll highway stretching from Tijuana in the west to around Mexicali in the east; one in Sonora, between Santa Ana and Altar; and another between the cities of Matamoros and Reynosa in Tamaulipas.

== Tijuana–Tecate and Libramiento de Tecate ==
Operated by IDEAL, the Autopista Tijuana-Tecate and Libramiento de Tecate run 17.55 kilometres (10.91 mi) and 12.25 kilometres (7.61 mi), respectively, with a combined toll of 111 pesos. The Highway 2D designation takes over from Baja California State Route 201 at the interchange with Bulevar Alberto Limón Padilla on the northeast edge of Tijuana, roughly following the course of the Tijuana River for a portion of its route. Three interchanges serve Tecate, two with Federal Highway 2 on either side of Tecate and a third with Blvd. Universidad which serves as the northern terminus of Mexican Federal Highway 3 to Ensenada.

== Tecate–La Rumorosa ==
East of Tecate, operation of the road transfers to Caminos y Puentes Federales for the 55.5 kilometres (34.5 mi) to La Rumorosa. Cars pay a toll of 67 pesos to travel the highway, paid at the El Hongo toll booth located at kilometer 30.

== La Rumorosa–El Centinela ==
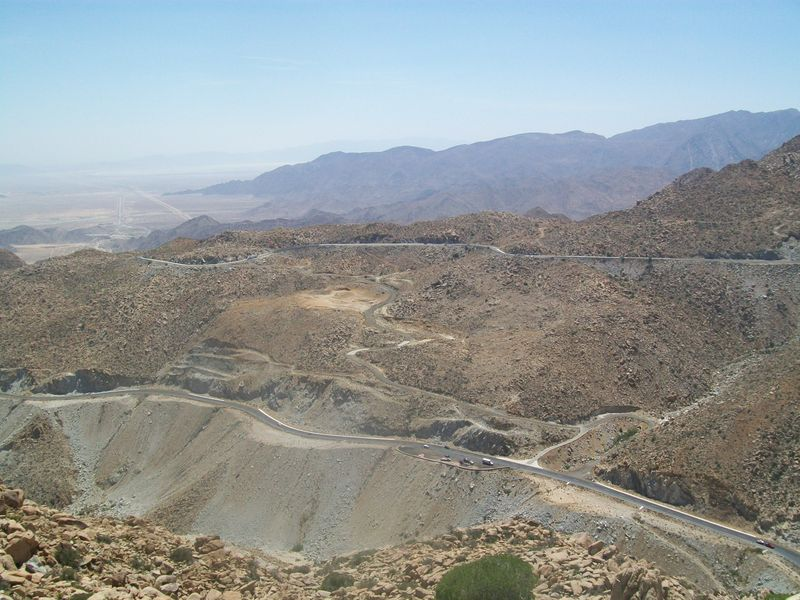
The highway east of La Rumorosa

From La Rumorosa, another 67-kilometre (42 mi) segment begins; this segment's concession is held by FIARUM (an acronym for Fideicomiso Público de Administración de Fondos de Inversión del Tramo Carretero Centinela-Rumorosa or "Public Trust to Administer Investment Funds for the Centinela-Rumorosa Highway)), an agency of the Government of the State of Baja California. After another interchange to La Rumorosa where the eastbound road absorbs free Highway 2, cars pay a 23-peso toll and traverse a winding road over the Sierra de Juárez, with separate mainlines for westbound and eastbound traffic. The eastbound mainline sits higher than the westbound and features two lookouts, Ojo de Aguila and El Caminero. The former opened in 2013 with an 867,000 peso investment from the highway and state cultural authorities, as well as a sculpture designed by artist Óscar Ortega. This road was first built in 1917 under the governorship of Esteban Cantu. Before this road was constructed, land travel between Tijuana and the rest of Mexico required travel through the United States.

Westbound and eastbound join east of the mountain at La Cuesta, which features a lookout and military inspection station; in 2015, the regional chapter of the National Confederation of Truck Drivers complained that military inspection stations in Sonora and Baja California added significant time to their itineraries. The highway straightens out and passes through long stretches of desert, with the segment ending at an interchange allowing motorists to choose free Highway 2 to downtown Mexicali or the Libramiento de Mexicali.

FIARUM, the state agency which holds the concession, was created in 1996.

On some days, due to winding roads and poor road conditions of Highway 2D, it is faster to travel between Tijuana and Mexicali through San Diego, California and Interstate 8 (Kumeyaay Highway) in California, if traffic volume of both San Ysidro Port of Entry and Calexico West Port of Entry are low.

== Libramiento de Mexicali ==
The Libramiento de Mexicali bypasses the city to the south, featuring the final 41 kilometres (25 mi) of highway in the 2D designation. OCACSA operates the highway, which opened on June 20, 2006, and charges cars a 75-peso toll to use it. The highway has just one interchange between its termini, allowing access to Mexican Federal Highway 5 to San Felipe. Traffic merges onto free Highway 2 between Ejido Cuernavaca and Ejido Sinaloa, to the east of Mexicali.

== Santa Ana–Altar ==
The 73 kilometres (45 mi) highway between Santa Ana and Altar, operated by the state government, is tolled, with cars being charged 105 pesos to use the road.

== Matamoros–Reynosa ==
Highway 2D in Tamaulipas is operated by CAPUFE and runs 44.6 kilometres (27.7 mi) from Matamoros to Reynosa. One toll booth, Nuevo Progreso, charges 67 pesos for cars.
