= Mexican Federal Highway 160D =

Toll highway in Mexico

Federal Highway 160D
- Carretera federal 160D
- Autopista La Pera-Cuautla

Route information
- Maintained by Caminos y Puentes Federales
- Length: 34.16 km (21.23 mi)

Major junctions
- West end: Fed. 95D at La Pera, Morelos
- Fed. 113 at Oaxtepec, Morelos
- East end: Fed. 115 / Fed. 160 in Cuautla, Morelos

Location
- Country: Mexico
- State: Morelos

Highway system
- Mexican Federal Highways; List; Autopistas

Federal Highway 160D is a toll highway primarily located in Morelos. It functions as a spur of Mexican Federal Highway 95D to the city of Cuautla. The road is operated by Caminos y Puentes Federales, which charges a toll of 54 pesos per car to travel Highway 160D.

== Route description ==
Highway 160D begins at an interchange with Highway 95D just after the La Pera curve and proceeds past a toll plaza at its first exit, serving Tepoztlán. It winds southeast to exit at Oacalco and Oaxtepec before continuing to its end point on the north side of Cuautla, where travelers can take Mexican Federal Highway 115 or continue on Highway 160 toward Izúcar de Matamoros, Puebla.

== History ==
In February 2017, a modernization project began that will widen Highway 160 from two to four lanes.
