= Mexican Federal Highway 162 =

Highway in Mexico

Federal Highway 162
- Carretera federal 162

Route information
- Maintained by Secretariat of Infrastructure, Communications and Transportation
- Length: 18.2 km (11.3 mi)
- Existed: 1936–present

Major junctions
- East end: Fed. 115D in Tepoztlán
- West end: Fed. 95D in Cuernavaca

Location
- Country: Mexico
- State: Morelos

Highway system
- Mexican Federal Highways; List; Autopistas
← Fed. 160	→ Fed. 166

Federal Highway 162 (Carretera Federal 162) is a Federal Highway of Mexico. The highway travels from Tepoztlán, Morelos in the east to Cuernavaca in the west. In Tepoztlán, the highway continues south to Yautepec as a Morelos state highway. Federal Highway 162 is an important connector route from Cuernavaca to El Tepozteco National Park and Tepoztlán, itself a popular tourist destination in Morelos that is an official Pueblo Mágico as designated by the federal government.
