= Cuetlajuchitlán =

Archaeological site in Guerrero, Mexico

Cuetlajuchitlán archaeological site
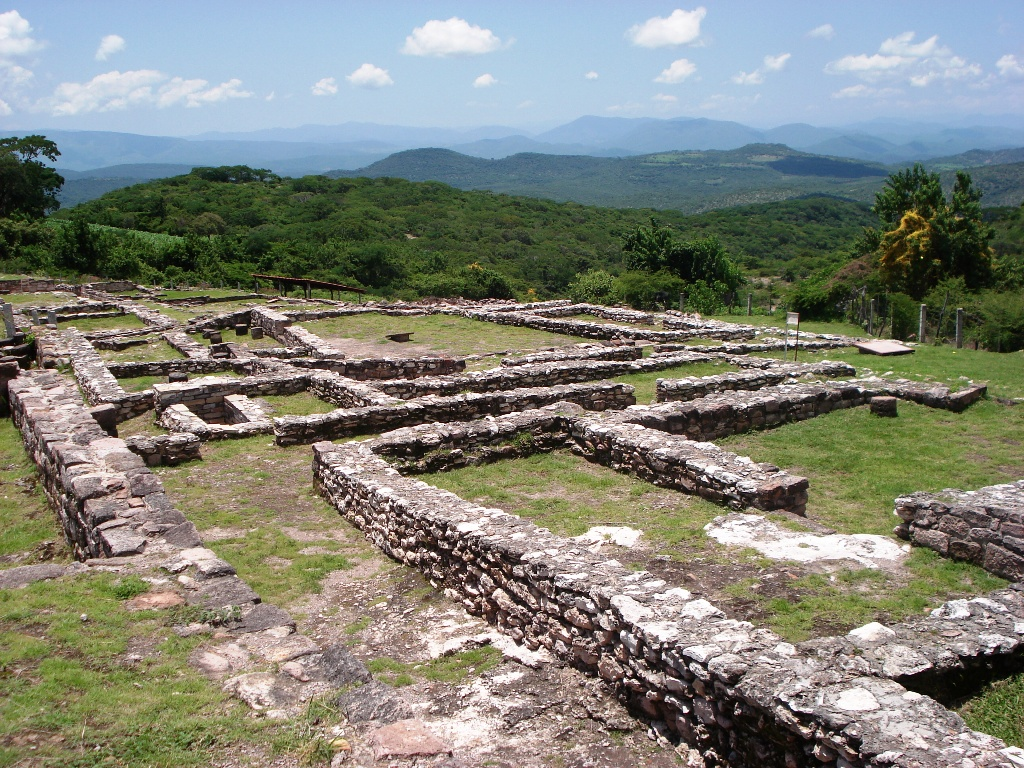
- Cuetlajuchitlán Archaeological Site
- Interactive map of Cuetlajuchitlán archaeological site
- 18°12′12″N 99°12′27″W
- Type: Archeology
- Periods: Mesoamerican Late Preclassical
- Cultures: Cuitlatec - Mezcala
- Location: Paso de Morelos, municipality of Huitzuco de los Figueroa, Guerrero, Mexico
- Region: Mesoamerica (Mexico)

History
- Built: 800 BCE – 300 CE

Site notes
- Website: Conaculta page Cuetlajuchitlán (Los Querendes)

Cuetlajuchitlán is a Mesoamerican archaeological site located 3 kilometers southeast of Paso Morelos, in the northeast of the Mexican state of Guerrero.

It was discovered in 1991 during construction work for the highway from Cuernavaca to Acapulco, which now crosses under the site 50 meters below, through the Los Querendes tunnel.

This site was one of the main pre-Hispanic population centers in this region during the late preclassical, of groups deriving from the Mezcala culture, in the large settlements of the Río Balsas. Its development occurred from 800 BCE to 300 CE, with relevance to archaeology of the state of Guerrero, due to its antiquity and functional architectural style, primarily for the storage and drainage systems, as well as the construction of stone columns.

== Toponymy ==
Paso Morelos was formerly known as Cuetlajuchitlán or Cuetlajuchi.

The word Cuetlajuchitlán formerly given to the original population, and now used for the archaeological site, is a Nahuatl word that means: "Place of red flowers" or "Withered place".

It may be that the "red flower" is in allusion to Poinsettia, native to the region.

== Archaeological site ==
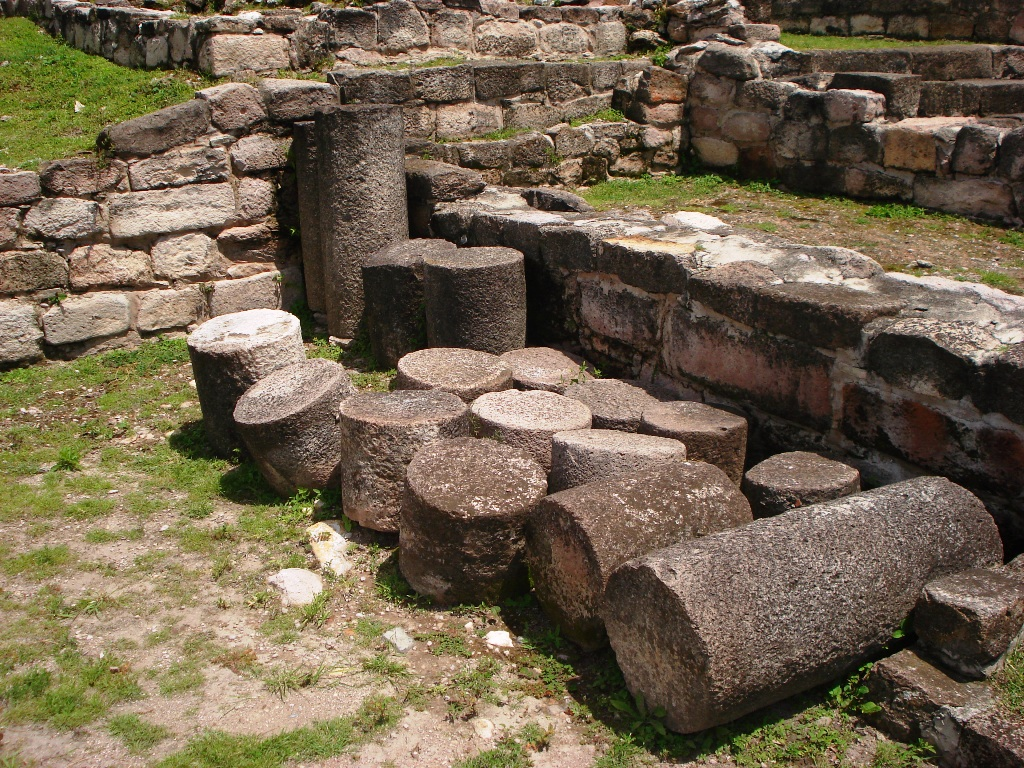
Many stone cylinders are found throughout the site.

The site is about 35 hectares in size, of which only two have been explored; sites already uncovered are located on a limestone hill, where the late Preclassical period settlements were found.

Cuetlajuchitlán, during its apogee had three constructive stages, over a period of about 900 years.

=== First stage ===
Very few archaeological remains were found in excavation from the first stage (800-600 BC).

This stage is characterized by limestone rock walls that make up leveling platforms as well as housing foundation, with figurines and some pots found. These materials show that the site was then a small village - perhaps dependent on a larger Olmec-related culture (Mezcala) settlement in the Balsas River region during the mid-preclassical era (800-1000 BCE), or, as it seems more likely, that it was inhabited by people who settled here around 600 BCE, at the decline of the Olmec sites.

=== Second stage ===
During the period of 200 BCE to 200 CE, Cuetlajuchitlán flourished; this is characterized by the abundance of ceramic objects, which were dated to the late preclassical period; also found in one of the corridors were sculptures carved on Tuff blocks, worn out by time. From this begins the architectural development of the site, with limestone blocks and cylinders carved for its construction in columns and walls, all very well defined in its manufacturing.

=== Third stage ===
This stage continued with development of buildings, whose material from previous constructions was reutilized; this included column blocks and Metates. Limestone walls are associated with the Mezcala culture style, By around 300 CE, the decline and abandonment of Cuetlajuchitlán had occurred.

== Site description ==
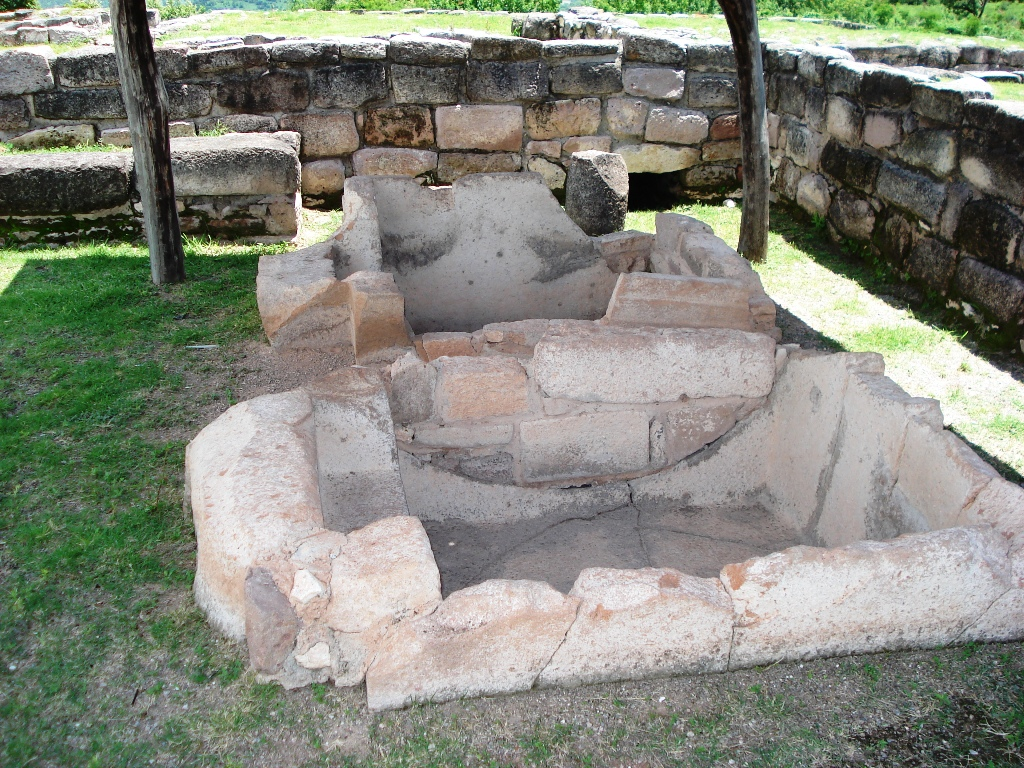
Monolythic Tub at the Ceremonial Enclosure # 1

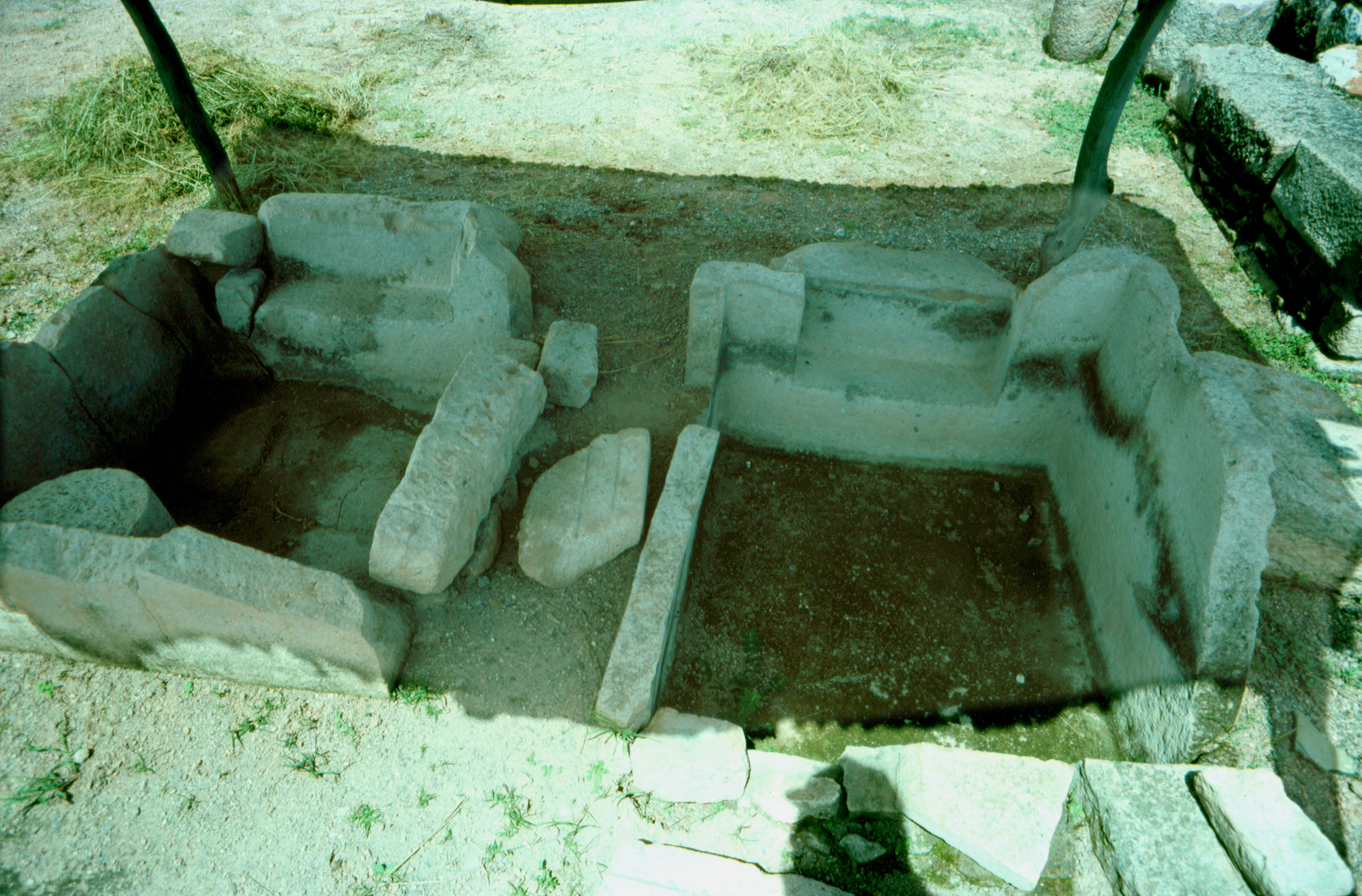
Monolithic Tub

The site has a complex architectural distribution, with stone slab streets, large platforms, open spaces, and others that functioned as rooms, warehouses, or possibly, as workshops where specialized activities were performed. From the architectural design, it may be inferred that elite groups lived here; they controlled communal activities and performed public and ceremonial activities. The site has several function places, these include two ceremonial enclosures and three residential housing complexes, it is believed that they were occupied by high-ranking people and craftsmen. The most important Cuetlajuchitlán buildings, in the two explored complexes are:

=== Ceremonial Enclosure 1 ===
This is the main structure of the site, it is rectangular and measures 28 m, north–south and 18 m east-west. Its large platform, sunken patio, and walls, were built with limestone blocks; two pink tubs carved from a single block were found here, probably used for ritual baths. These baths have a seat on the western side, with an external design resembling an eyebrow, similar to the constructive style of the area. Close to the main platform is a Temazcal or ancient steam bath.

=== Ceremonial Enclosure 2 ===
Situated next to ceremonial enclosure 1, at the southeast end with an enclosed small space, are two tubs that probably were used before the enclosure construction. As evidence, its construction materials were reutilized in an area used for rectangular and circular pink stone block carving and storage, and later used for building construction.

== Structures ==
=== Residential housing complex ===
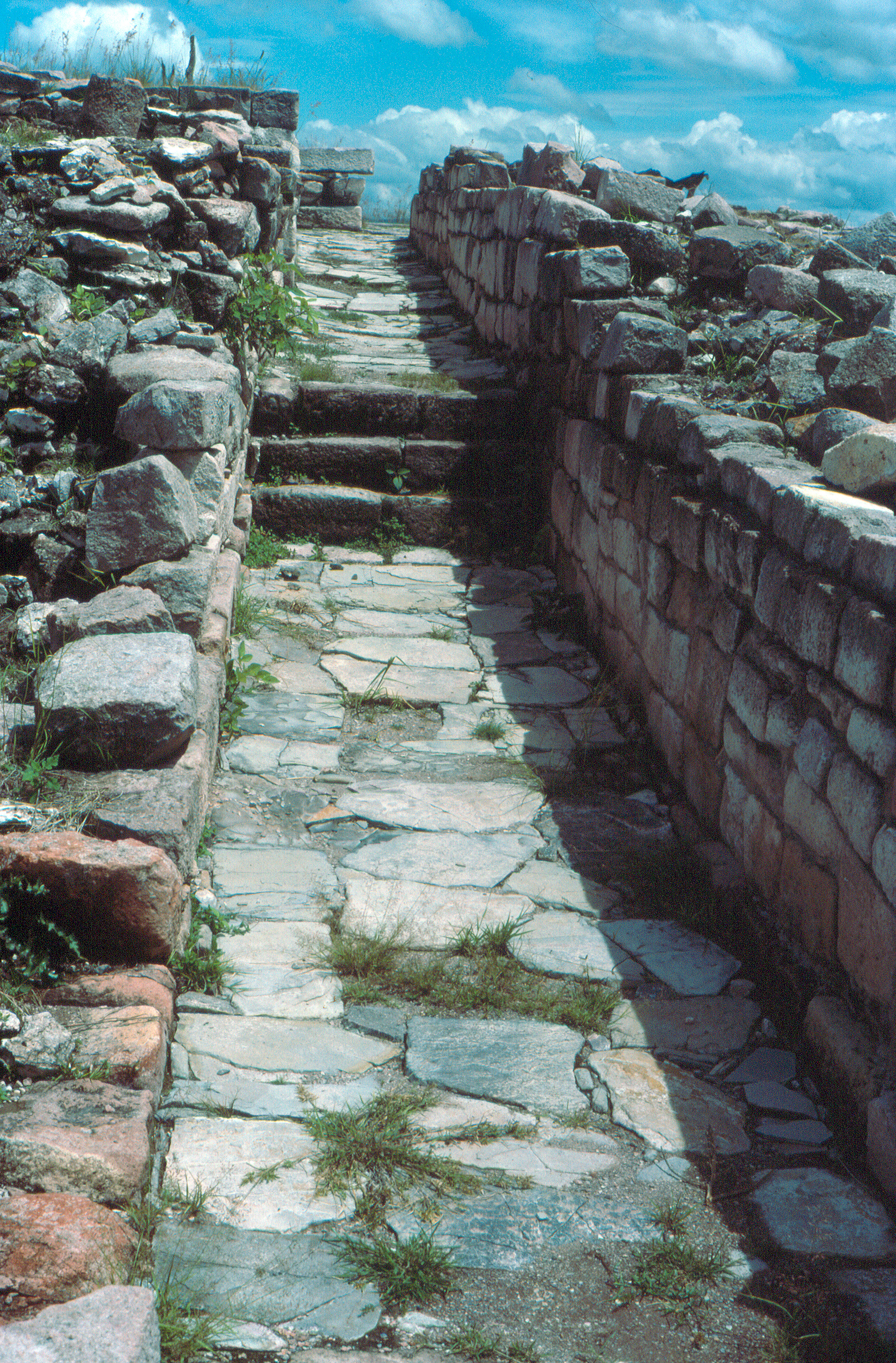
Stone Slab Street

These were places inhabited by the local elites, located in the northern, southern and western slopes of the hill. Features include the street continuation on axes distributed around well-defined platforms; pink limestone rooms were built with sunken patios and their respective drainage system, water tanks, and small storage areas.

=== Complex 8 ===
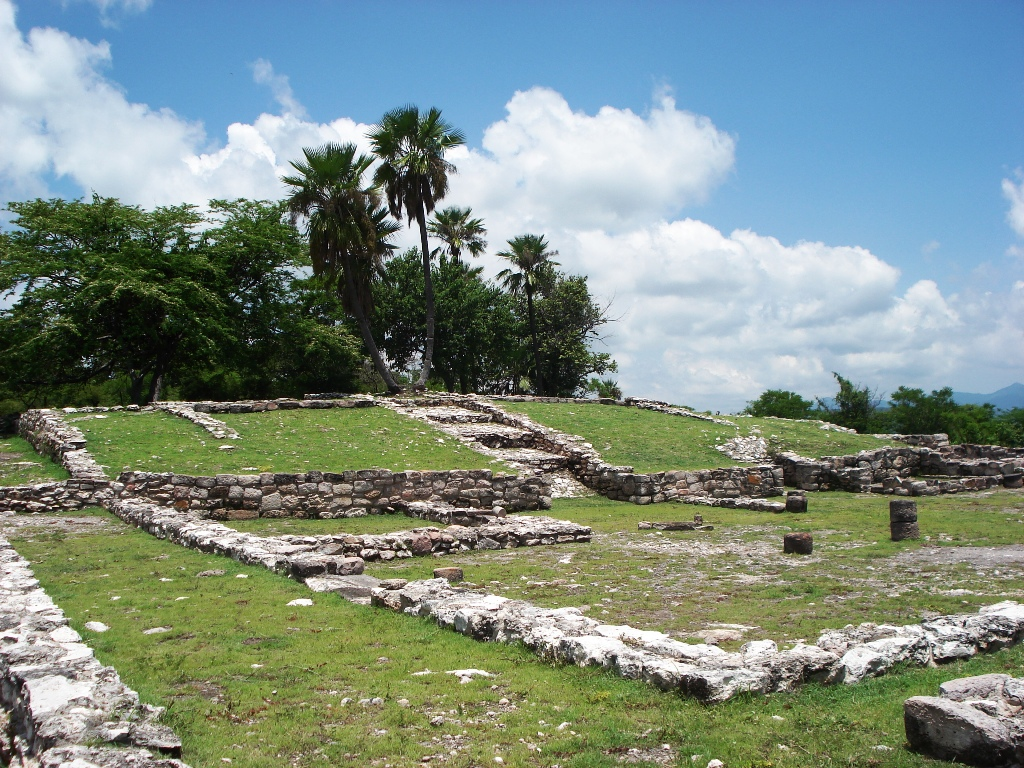
Complex 8, surrounded by several residential housing complexes.

Located some 200 meters outside the area previously explored, it is a vast complex consisting of a square surrounded by platforms with housing units, which in turn, had their respective water tanks and a water channel. The center has a great platform where probably the house of an elite person was placed, perhaps the person who ruled Cuetlajuchitlán at that time.

=== Storage areas ===
In several ports of the site are some constructions with shape and dimensions similar to storage areas, possibly for grain, food, or manufactured products. These underground deposits were built with limestone walls and floor slabs. A large amount of ceramic pots fragments were found in these.

== Site access ==
The site is located at kilometer 188 of the Cuernavaca–Acapulco highway (Federal Highway 95D), 3 kilometers southeast of Paso Morelos, Huitzuco de los Figueroa, where there is access to the site. Site visits are Tuesday through Sunday from 10:00 to 17:00.

== Other sites in the municipality ==
=== Cerro de Huashocote ===
Located north of the municipality.

=== Tlaxmalac ===
Located to the west is a rock with a carved head, a faithful testimony of culture.

=== Barrio Cantón ===
During excavations, many ceramic and stone figures were found in original conditions.

=== La Maroma ===
Located to southeast, ceramic and stone idols also were found, as well as jade mask objects.

== Other sites in the region ==
- Teopantecuanitlán, in Copalillo
- La Organera, in Xochipala
- Huamuxtitlán, in the municipality of the same name
- Los Tepoltzis, in Tixtla
- Ixcateopan, in the municipality of the same name
- La Sabana and Palma Sola, in Acapulco
- Pezuapan, located in Chilpancingo city, Guerrero
- La Soledad de Maciel, in Petatlán
- Oxtotitlán, in Chilapa
- Tehuacalco, between this municipality and Juan R. Escudero

== See also ==
- Cuitlatec language
- Cuitlatec people

== Bibliography ==
- Manzanilla López, Rúben & Talavera González, Jorge Arturo, Cuetlajuchitlán, Sitio Preurbano en la Región Mezcala., (2006). Arqueológia Mexicana, vol. XIV, No. 82. Id = 0188-8218 (in Spanish)
