= William Niven =

Scottish mineralogist and archeologist

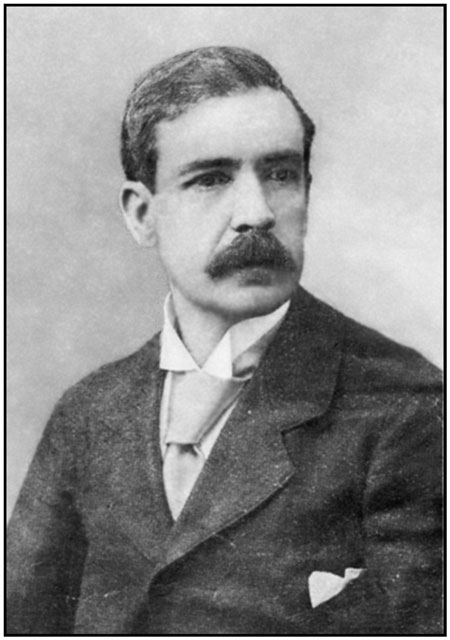
- William Niven, mineralogist, circa 1895
- Born: 6 October 1850; Bellshill, Lanarkshire, Scotland
- Died: 2 June 1937 (aged 86); Austin, Texas, United States
- Known for: Mineral discoveries; "Niven tablets"
- Scientific career
- Fields: Mineralogy, archeology

William Niven (2 October 1850 – 2 June 1937) was a mineralogist and archeologist noted for his discovery of the minerals yttrialite, thorogummite, aguilarite and nivenite (named after him), as well as a set of controversial tablets. Originally from Scotland, Niven came to the United States in 1879, where he became heavily involved in mineralogy and mining.

== Mineral discoveries ==
Niven's first major contribution to mineralogy occurred in 1889 while he was on an expedition to Llano County, Texas, on behalf of Thomas Edison. Niven was looking for the mineral gadolinite, which was used as a street lamp filament. It was on this expedition that he discovered three new minerals, yttrialite, thorogummite, and nivenite.

In the 1890s, Niven discovered the mineral aguilarite while on an exploration trip to Mexico. He also found new deposits of rare minerals in New York and New Jersey.

== In Mexico ==
Niven eventually became interested in archaeology through his travels to Mexico and excavations being undertaken there at the time. Niven began his archaeological work in Guerrero, Mexico where, among of other work, he purchased the first rediscovered Xochipala-style figurine. Due to the Mexican Revolution of 1910, however, he was forced to move to the Valley of Mexico.

== The "Niven Tablets" ==
In 1921, Niven discovered the first of over 100 andesite tablets on a dig in San Miguel Amantla, Azcapotzalco, which was an important city-state conquered by Aztec Triple Alliance in 1431. The area now forms part of northwestern Mexico City. The indecipherable markings on these tablets were the subject of much controversy over the last years of Niven's life.

The so-called Niven Tablets are and have been surrounded by controversy since their discovery by Niven in 1921. They have been associated with Scandinavian petroglyphs as posited by Ludovic Mann and they have also been associated with lost continent theories. Their association with lost continent theories comes through James Churchward's interpretation of the symbols found on the tablets.

James Churchward offered an interpretation of the tablets that caused less belief in their authenticity. Churchward was a major proponent of theories regarding lost continents, specifically the continent of Mu. He believed that early in the history of the world there existed a continent which was called Mu. This civilization, according to Churchward and many others, was very technologically advanced but was destroyed due to natural disaster. After viewing rubbings of Niven's tablets Churchward strongly believed that there were a group of people that escaped destruction and migrated to other parts of the world spreading their culture and belief system. He believed that the symbols and markings found on the tablets had roots in the ancient culture of Mu. This furthered speculation that the tablets were a hoax. Historian Ronald H. Fritze has noted that archaeologists have dismissed Churchward's pseudohistorical ideas and Niven's tablets were a "crude although voluminous hoax".

Niven spent the good part of his life selling the tablets and trying to find out their origin and meaning. This was never accomplished. The tablets were interpreted by many people and many theories were posited, but to no avail. They were eventually lost during the latter part of Niven's life, during their attempted shipment from Mexico to the US. The only remaining evidence is the rubbings that were taken from the actual tablets.

== Family ==
William Niven was born on 6 October 1850 in Bellshill, Lanarkshire, Scotland to William Niven and Sarah Brown. He was the second of eight children.

Niven's grandson, Roland H. Harrison, co-authored the book Buried Cities, Forgotten Gods, which is a record of Niven's life and work.

== In fiction ==
Niven is the basis for the character William Givens in Katherine Anne Porter's short story Maria Concepcion.
