= Oaxtepec =

Town in Mexico

Coordinates: 18°54′N 98°58′W

Oaxtepec (historically written as Huaxtepec) is a town within the municipality of Yautepec and the Cuautla metropolitan area in the eastern part of the Mexican state of Morelos. Its main industry is tourism, mostly aimed at the inhabitants of nearby Mexico City, and the town possesses various aquatic resorts and hotels. The climate is tropical and the countryside very lush.

The population of Oaxtepec is 7,097 (2020). Oaxtepec had 6,939 inhabitants in 2010. During the XIX Olympiad in 1968, Oaxtepec was the venue and staging area for the World Youth Camp component of the Cultural Olympiad. Equestrian events at the 1968 Olympiad were held in Oaxtepec.

== History ==
In pre-Columbian times, already one of the largest towns in the region, it was conquered by the Aztecs under the rule of Moctezuma Ilhuicamina. During Moctezuma Ilhuicamina's reign (1440–1469), the first leisure center for nobles was created in the warm territory of Oaxtepec, as well as low lands to the south of Tenochtitlan valley, today's Morelos. Moctezuma ordered to use the water springs of Oaxtepec to create an irrigation system for agriculture and preservation of important vegetation of the Aztec empire. An elaborate royal garden was established here where both flowers and other plants were cultivated. This was the first botanical garden in the Americas.

According to the Relacion de Huaxtepec, the Aztec calpixqui (steward) for Oaxtepec was separate from the local tlatoani, who held the title tultecateteutli ("Toltec lord") and was assisted by twelve officials similar to judges. In 1519, the tlatoani of Oaxtepec was Tizapapalotzin. Local products of Oaxtepec included cotton, cacao, limestone, amate and rock crystal, and the town had a commercial partnership with nearby Totolapan. Oaxtepec fought wars against Jiutepec and the individual altepeme of Tlaxcala.

When the Spanish first arrived in the region, they marveled at the beauty of the place. They praised Oaxtepec in their chronicles of the Aztec conquest.

In the 16th century, thanks to the great number of medicinal plants found in the region, the Spaniards decided to build the Santa Cruz de Oaxtepec hospital. Bernandino Álvares directed the project in 1569 and for the next two hundred years it was administrated by the Hermanos de la Caridad (Brother of Charity). The Templo de Santo Domingo de Guzmán (Church of Saint Dominic of Guzman) was built on the ruins of the main pyramid of Oaxtepec.

A major event occurred in 1964 when the Centro Vacacional Adolfo López Mateos IMSS Oaxtepec (waterpark run by Mexican Social Security Institute) was built on 120 hectares of land. This was the most important water park in Latin America. In 2018 it was remodeled, sold to a private company, and renamed Six Flags Hurricane Harbor. A smaller water park called Parque Acuatico Oaxtepec (PAO) used to be in the area, but it was purchased by Hurricane Harbor.

== Name and location ==
The etymology of Oaxtepec is from the Nahuatl language and it means "On the mountain of huajes". Huaje is the Mexican Spanish name for the leadtree, Leucaena esculenta, whose fruits are edible and is a popular food in south-central Mexico.

Oaxtepec is located at an altitude of 1,377 metres (4,518 ft) above sea level.

- 12 kilometres (7.5 mi) from the municipal seat of Yautepec.
- 14 kilometres (8.7 mi) (21 minutes) from Cuautla, Morelos.
- 44 kilometres (27 mi) (44 minutes) from the state capital of Cuernavaca.
- 91 kilometres (57 mi) (1 hour, 47 minutes) via Mexican Federal Highway 113 or 100 kilometres (62 mi) (1 hour, 29 minutes) via Mexican Federal Highway 95D and Mexican Federal Highway 115D from Mexico City.

== Places of interest ==
=== Monastery of Santo Domingo ===
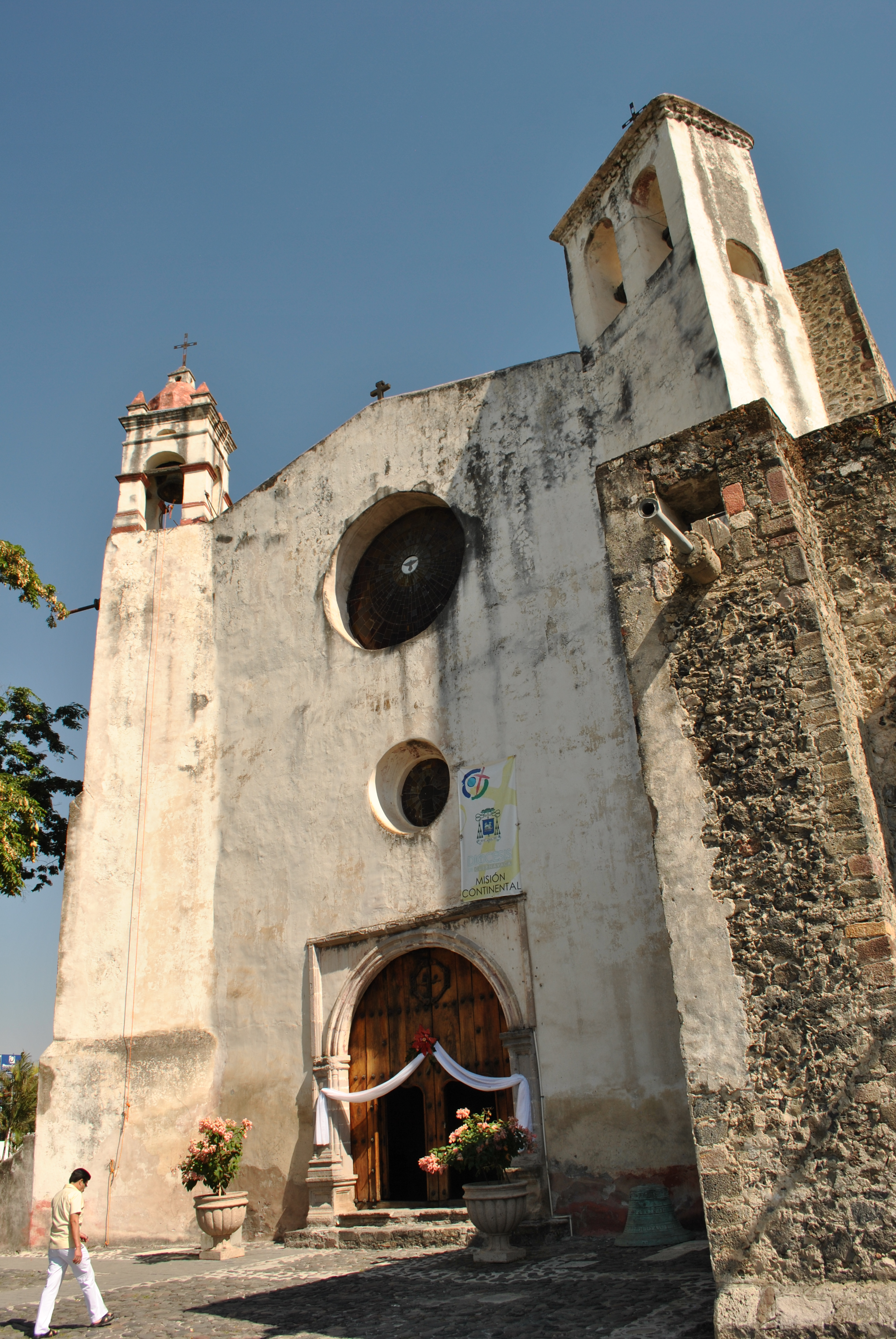
Facade of the Ex Convent of Santo Domingo de Guzmán, Oaxtepec, Morelos.

The Ex-convento of Santo Domingo Félix de Guzmán was built by the Dominican Order between 1528 and 1580. The church was actually called Santiago Apóstol. It consists of an atrium opening onto the town's main plaza, a single nave, and two small chapels. There are two towers on the side.

During the Siege of Cuautla (1812), the church served as headquarters for General Leonardo Bravo. It also served as a headquarters for the Liberation Army of the South during the Mexican Revolution. Later it was a high school incorporated with the Autonomous University of the State of Morelos, (UAEM) and as the local House of Culture. A few years ago it was returned to the Church.

=== Water Parks ===
Six Flags Hurricane Harbor is a chain of water parks headquartered in Grand Prairie, Texas. Features include a variety of body slides, speed slides, tube slides, wave pools, lazy rivers, and shopping areas. The Oaxtepec water park opened in 2017 and is one of the largest in Latin America. The water park opened as Centro Vacacional "Adolfo López Mateos" IMSS Oaxtepec on 120 hectares (300 acres) of land run by the Mexican Social Security Institute in 1964. In 1998, it was sold to a private company and reopened as "Parque Acuático Oaxtepec (PAO)"; the company went into bankruptcy in 2011, after which it was sold to Six Flags. The Social Security Institute runs hotels and campgrounds within the park.

Balneario El Bosque Oaxtepec ("The Oaxtepec forest water park″) is a rustic water park with a suspension bridge, waterfalls, river, pools, and archeological zone. The Pozo Azul (Blue Pond) is believed to have been used by Tlatoani Moctezuma I in the 15th century.

=== Archeology ===
In addition to the archeological site within the water park named above, prehispanic ruins can be found on the Cerro de los Huajes ("Hill of leadtrees") near the cemetery. Ruins of the colonial (1586-1820) Hospital de la Santa Cruz, built by the Brothers of Charity (Spanish: Hospitalarios) are near "El Bosque" water park.

== Climate ==
Climate data for Oaxtepec
Month	Jan	Feb	Mar	Apr	May	Jun	Jul	Aug	Sep	Oct	Nov	Dec	Year
Mean daily maximum °C (°F)	27.1 (80.8)	28.6 (83.5)	30.7 (87.3)	32 (90)	32.1 (89.8)	29.6 (85.3)	28.5 (83.3)	28.3 (82.9)	27.6 (81.7)	27.9 (82.2)	27.7 (81.9)	27 (81)	29.0 (84.2)
Mean daily minimum °C (°F)	12.4 (54.3)	13.4 (56.1)	15.3 (59.5)	17.1 (62.8)	18 (64)	17.4 (63.3)	16.3 (61.3)	16.3 (61.3)	16.3 (61.3)	15.3 (59.5)	13.6 (56.5)	12.6 (54.7)	15.3 (59.5)
Average precipitation mm (inches)	10 (0.4)	5.1 (0.2)	5.1 (0.2)	13 (0.5)	53 (2.1)	200 (8)	170 (6.7)	200 (7.9)	200 (7.9)	76 (3)	15 (0.6)	5.1 (0.2)	960 (37.7)
Source: Weatherbase

== See also ==
- List of people from Morelos
- Cocoyoc
- List of archaeological sites in Mexico
- Spanish conquest of the Aztec Empire
- Hernán Cortés

== Literature ==
- Hassig, Ross (1988). Aztec Warfare: Imperial Expansion and Political Control. Norman: University of Oklahoma Press. ISBN 0-8061-2121-1.
