= Mezcala culture =

Mesoamerican Culture

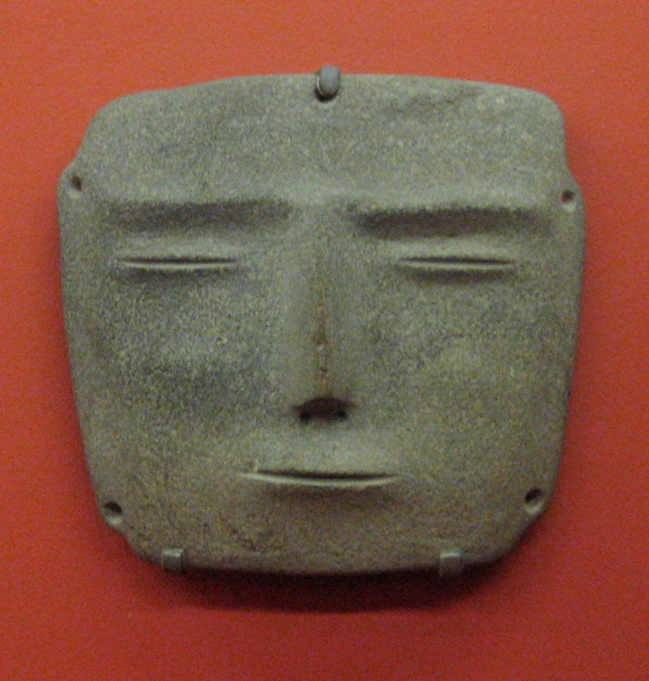
Mezcala stone mask at the Los Angeles County Museum of Art

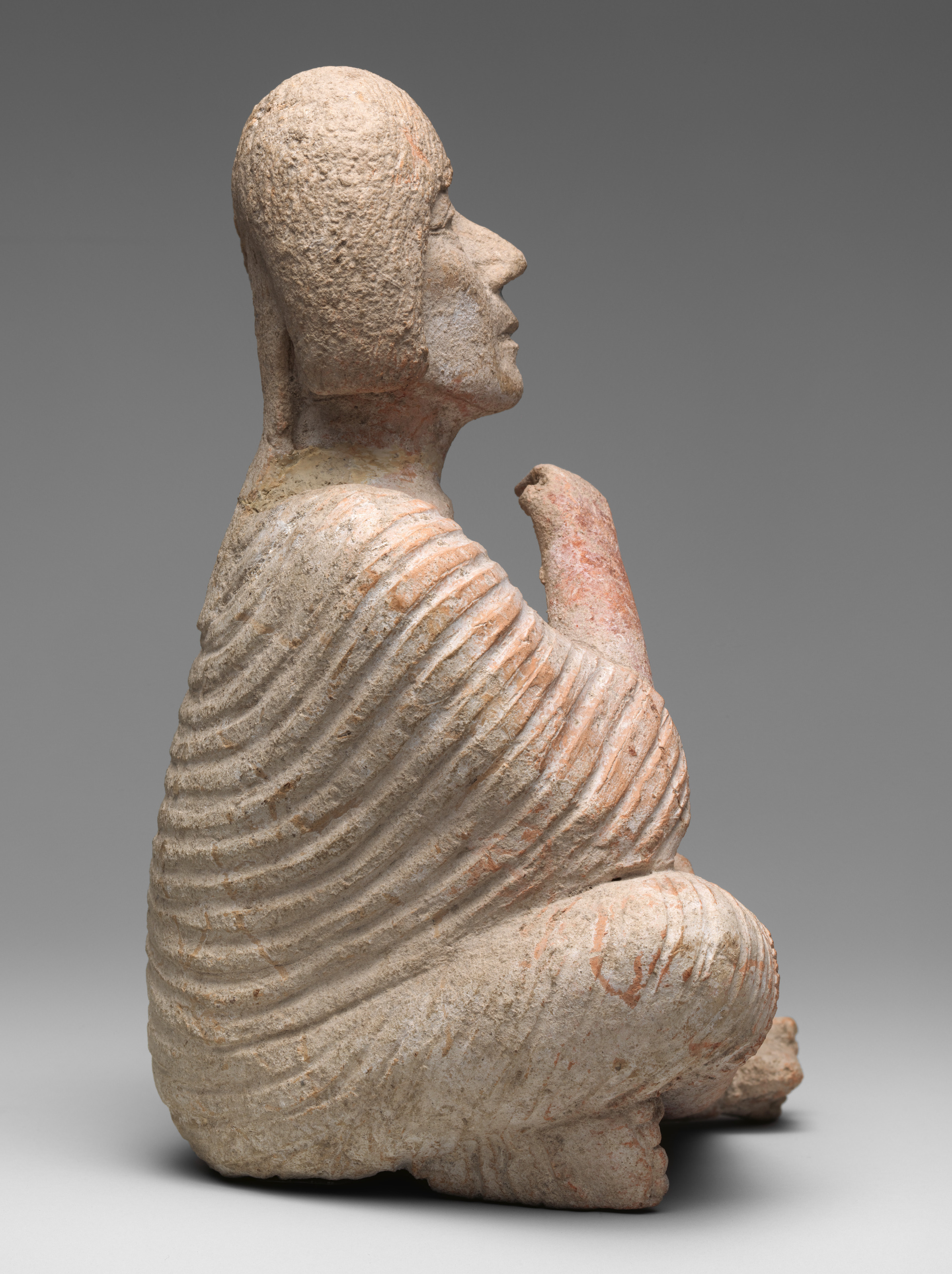
Female Figure, Xochipala site. MET Museum, Rockefeller collection 2014.244.2)

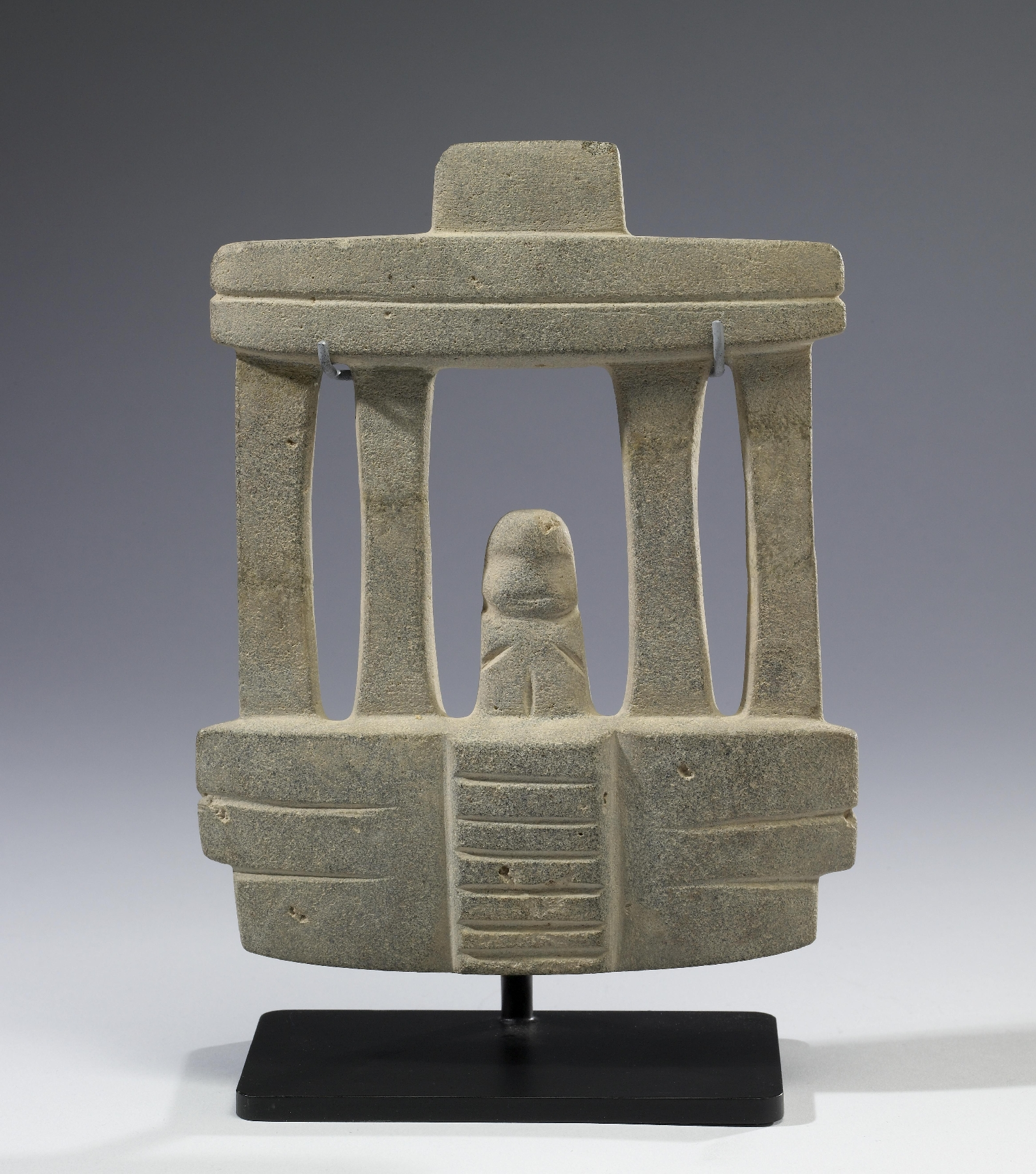
Mezcala Temple Model, Walters Art Museum. The Mezcala sculptural style emphasizes geometric abstraction in both human figures and architectural models.

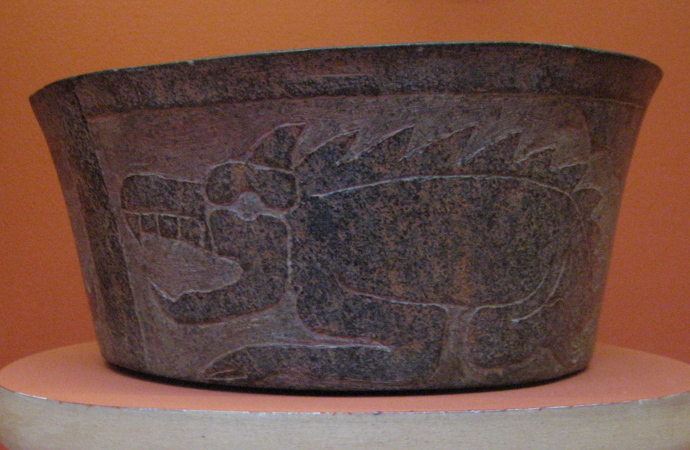
Mezcala stone bowl, with a fanciful creature. LACMA collections

The Mezcala culture (sometimes referred to as the Balsas culture) is the name given to a Mesoamerican culture that was based in the southern Mexican state of Guerrero, in the upper Balsas River region. The culture is poorly understood but is believed to have developed during the Middle and Late Preclassic periods of Mesoamerican chronology, between 700 and 200 BC. The culture continued into the Classic period (c.250-650 AD) when it coexisted with the great metropolis of Teotihuacan.

Archaeologists have studied the culture through limited controlled excavations, the examination of looted artifacts, and the study of Mezcala sculptures found as dedicatory offerings at the Aztec complex of Tenochtitlan.

== Archaeological excavations ==
The Mezcala cultural region has been heavily looted by the local population, as these items have proven desirable on the art market. In terms of archaeological resources, the present-day state of Guerrero has not seen extensive professional excavations; prehistoric cultures found there are among the least understood in Mexico. Only one Preclassic Mezcala site, Ahuinahuac, has been investigated by archaeologists undertaking controlled excavations. Excavations of Classic period Mezcala sites have taken place at Organera Xochipala and El Mirador. The sculptural style of the Mezcala culture is largely known from looted andesite and serpentine artifacts.

== History ==
Based on excavations in Guerrero, examination of looted artifacts, and excavation of Mezcala artifacts at Teotihuacan, archaeologists have given the name "Mezcala culture" to a Mesoamerican culture that was based in the present-day southern Mexican state of Guerrero, in the upper Balsas River region. Archaeologists believe that the culture developed during the Middle and Late Preclassic periods of Mesoamerican chronology, between 700 and 200 BC. and continued into the Classic period (c.250-650 AD). At this time, the great metropolis of Teotihuacan developed to the north in the Valley of Mexico.

In the Mezcala area, Teotihuacan influence is pervasive. At the same time, there was also considerable influence going the other way, from the Mezcala area to Teotihuacan.

Anthropologists characterized the western societies as chiefdoms, at a time when states rose in Central Mexico. Unlike other areas of western Mexico, the Guerrero tradition in ceramics and site planning shows influence from Central Mexico. For instance, settlements along the Balsas River had pyramids, central plazas and ball courts.

The later Aztecs apparently excavated Mezcala sculptures and valued them, since the works have been found among the dedicatory offerings excavated at the Great Temple of Tenochtitlan, built in the 14th and 15th centuries. These included over fifty-six masks and ninety-eight figurines. Twenty-six of the figurines were divided equally between two stone boxes and arranged in south-facing rows.

== Sculpture ==
Mezcala-style sculpture is characterised by abstract facial features, suggested by lines and differences in texture. The sculptural style of the Mezcala culture may have been influenced by the Olmecs. In turn, it may have influenced the development of sculpture at the Classic-period metropolis of Teotihuacan in the Valley of Mexico.

== See also ==
- Cuetlajuchitlán
- Teopantecuanitlan
- Xochipala
