= Mexican Federal Highway 111 =

Highway in Mexico

Federal Highway 111
- Carretera federal 111

Route information
- Maintained by Secretariat of Infrastructure, Communications and Transportation
- Length: 35.11 km (21.82 mi)

Major junctions
- North end: Fed. 51 in San Miguel de Allende
- South end: Fed. 57 / Fed. 57D east of Buenavista

Location
- Country: Mexico

Highway system
- Mexican Federal Highways; List; Autopistas
← Fed. 110	→ Fed. 113

Federal Highway 111 (Carretera Federal 111) is a Federal Highway of Mexico. The highway is a short connector route that links the Buenavista, Querétaro area at Mexican Federal Highway 57 in the east to San Miguel de Allende, Guanajuato in the west.
