= Mezcala Bridge =

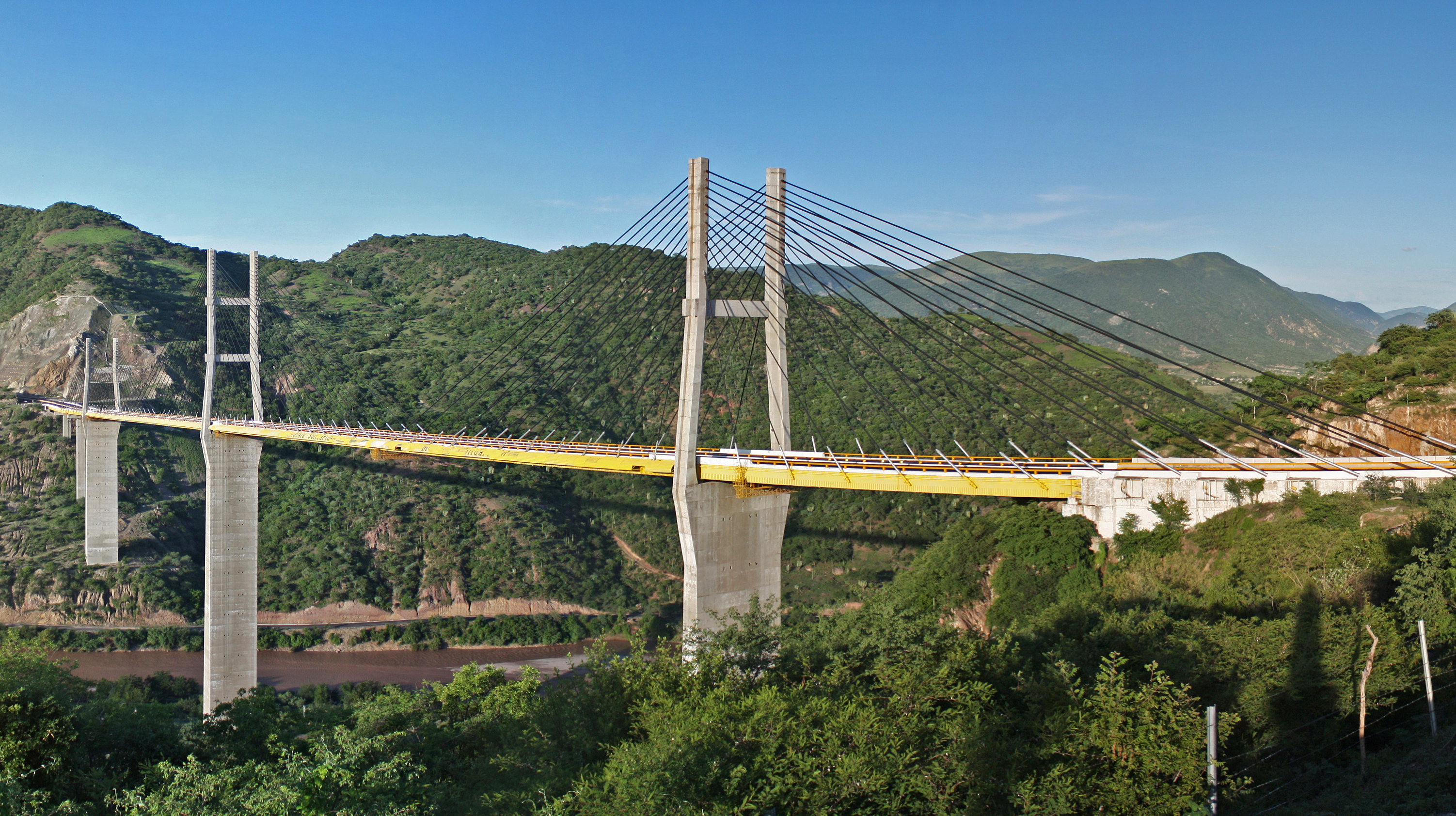
- Coordinates: 17.936832°N 99.369256°W
- Carries: Mexican Federal Highway 95D from Cuernavaca to Acapulco
- Crosses: Mezcala River (also called the Balsas River)
- Locale: Eduardo Neri / Tepecoacuilco de Trujano, Guerrero, Mexico
- Official name: Mezcala Bridge
- Other name(s): Mezcala Solidaridad

Characteristics
- Design: Cable-stayed bridge
- Total length: 891 m (2,923 ft)
- Longest span: Six uneven spans with max span of 313 metres (1,027 ft)

History
- Opened: 1993

The Mezcala Bridge (also known as the Mezcala-Solidaridad Bridge), is a cable-stayed bridge located in the state of Guerrero on Highway 95D in Mexico. It spans the Balsas River (known locally as the Mezcala River) close to the western Pacific coast of the country. This bridge, with a total length of 891 m (2,923 ft) and six uneven spans completed in 1993, has been in service since 1994 as a toll bridge.

It was the world's tallest bridge from its opening in 1993 to 1998 when the Akashi-Kaikyo Bridge in Japan was opened. It was also the highest bridge in Mexico and the second highest multiple cable-stayed bridge to be built in the world.

The Mezcala Bridge was built as part of the 1989–1994 highway restructuring program in Mexico, which reduced the distance of Highway 95 between Cuernavaca and Acapulco by 49 km.

The bridge suffered a fire in one of its cable systems in March 2007 when there was an accident on the main deck. The fire resulted when a coconut-carrying truck collided with two school buses. The bridge was only partially closed until the damaged cable was replaced.

== History ==
A new national highway program was initiated in Mexico between 1989 and 1994. Under this program, the federal highway "Cuernavaca - Acapulco", also called the "Route of the Sun", was proposed to be re-routed to reduce the distance, as well as travel time. A new planned route of 263 km (163 mi) length was drawn which reduced the distance by 49 km (30 mi) between Cuernavaca and Acapulco, and also reduced the travel time between México City and the port of Acapulco to about 3.5 hours.

This rerouting of the highway, however, required crossing of the Balsas River (also known as the Mezcala River) at a location (150 km (93 mi) from Cuernavaca where the river width from bank to bank varied from 800–1,000 m (2,600–3,300 ft). The hill slopes on the banks were also found to be steep. Consequently, the Mezcala bridge was planned and designed to cross high over the river. This bridge is also known by the name "Mezcala-Solidaridad" bridge.

In 2010, as part of Mexico's celebrations for its bicentennial, a series of roads were deemed to be part of "Ruta 2010", that commemorated various paths taken during military campaigns. Highway 95 was a part of the path called "The Sentiments of the Nation Route", which included the connection between Mexico City and Acapulco. The route commemorated a military campaign led by José María Morelos.

== Design features ==
The innovative overall concept of this bridge featured four adjacent main spans sustained by three consecutive harps of cable stays attached to three tall towers, with the central tower being the central main pylon (pier) of 173 m (568 ft) in height. The overall design was by Mexican engineer Modesto Armijo, head of the Mexican company "COMEC SA", for the account of the federal Secretaría de Comunicaciones y Transportes (Secretariat of Communications and Transportation). The detailed design was also achieved by Modesto Armijo and Alain Chauvin from "COMEC, S.A.". While COMEC did the structural engineering design, the engineering designs were checked by EEG Europe Etudes Gecti and the cables were supplied by Freyssinet International.

The calculation of the static and dynamic effects of turbulent wind on the bridge, when in service and under construction, was carried out using the "Scanner" computer program, taking into account the aerodynamic measurements made at the Carmel West Wind Laboratory (J. Raggett) on a model of the bridge deck, with the help of Pr Scanlan. Careful studies of the behavior of this bridge under seismic conditions were also carried out using the same computer program.

The valley over which the bridge passes is approximately 160 m (520 ft) deep. The bridge consists of six spans, with lengths of the spans in the following order: 42 m (138 ft), 69 m (226 ft), 86 m (282 ft), 301 m (988 ft), 313 m (1,027 ft), and 80 m (260 ft), for a total length of 891 m (2,923 ft).

=== Construction material ===
The bridge is categorized as a cable-stayed bridge, and has H-pylon supports with semi-fan arrangement. The piers of the bridge were constructed with reinforced cement concrete. Both the superstructure and the cable are made of steel. A cable supported concrete pylon structure was adopted due to high seismic conditions of the area.

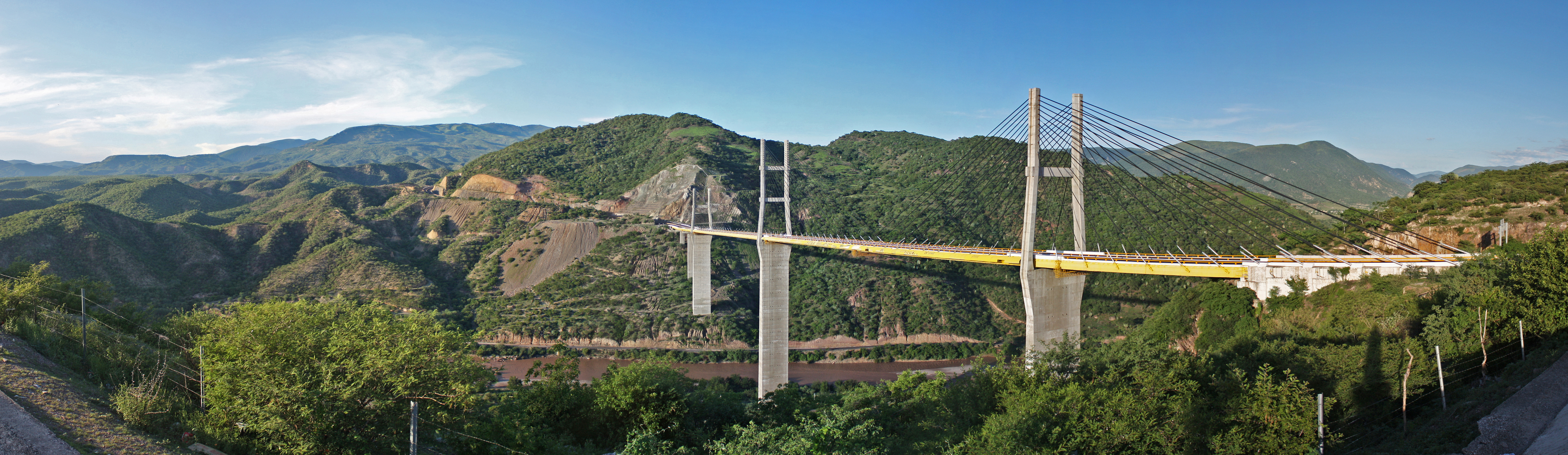
Panoramic view of the Mezcala Bridge from the south side of the Mezcala River.

== Failure event ==
The multispan stayed or cable bridge suffered damages to one of the stay cables with a minor damage to an adjoining cable during a fire that was created due to an accident on March 17, 2007, between two school buses and a truck at the middle span of the bridge. The truck was carrying coconuts, which was the reason for the fire. After closing the bridge for vehicular traffic temporarily, the cable was replaced; though traffic was partially restored when the cable replacement started. Analysis of the cause of the fire by the American Society of Civil Engineers and the China Communications and Transportation Association indicated that the high-density polyethylene (HDPE) sheathing, which has hydrocarbon composition, was not sufficiently fire resistant as it caught fire and created additional fire load which resulted in snapping of one cable line. A moot question that was posed in the analysis was "would this bridge have survived the loss of two or three adjacent cables?" Analysis also showed that multiple cables could be included in a fire caused by a lightning strike.

Bridge designers have examined the lacunae in design of major long span bridges of various types in the world, keeping in view the failures that have occurred in many bridges including the limited failure of the cable of the Mezcala Bridge due to a single point loading event that occurred due to a fire. This study was done with the objective "to enhance the reliability and safety of these major structures in the built environment." The approach under consideration for cable stayed bridge is "a more rational approach from assigning factors of safety to key elements such as suspenders and stay cables, to setting depth and stiffness requirements."

== See also ==
- List of tallest bridges in the world
