= Xochipala =

Archaeological site in Guerrero, Mexico

Coordinates: 17.811°N 99.639°W

Xochipala in relation to other Formative Period archaeological sites

Xochipala is a minor archaeological site in the Mexican state of Guerrero, whose name has become attached, somewhat erroneously, to a style of Formative Period figurines and pottery from 1500 to 200 BCE. The archaeological site is much later and belongs to the Classic and Postclassic eras, approximately 200–1400 CE.

== Archaeological site ==
The Organera Xochipala archaeological zone takes its name from the nearby village of Xoxhipala and the local organ pipe cactus. The archaeological site belongs to the Classic and, most importantly, the Postclassic eras, from 200 to 1400 CE. In the mid-20th century this site, representative of the Mezcala culture, was extensively looted of an estimated 20,000 pieces. Most of the sculptural artifacts have been studied as looted pieces appearing in art collections.

The area is known for its Xochipala-style figurines and stone bowls, which have been dated to the Formative (or Preclassic) Period 1500 to 200 BCE.

The site is particularly notable for the discovery of a corbelled arch, an innovation generally attributed the Maya. Whether the corbelled arch was independently developed in Guerrero or was imported from the Maya regions is still unsettled.

The mound complex of Las Mesas is located about six kilometers to the south/southwest of the modern town of Xochipala. Some important monoliths were found there.

== Formative Period figurines ==
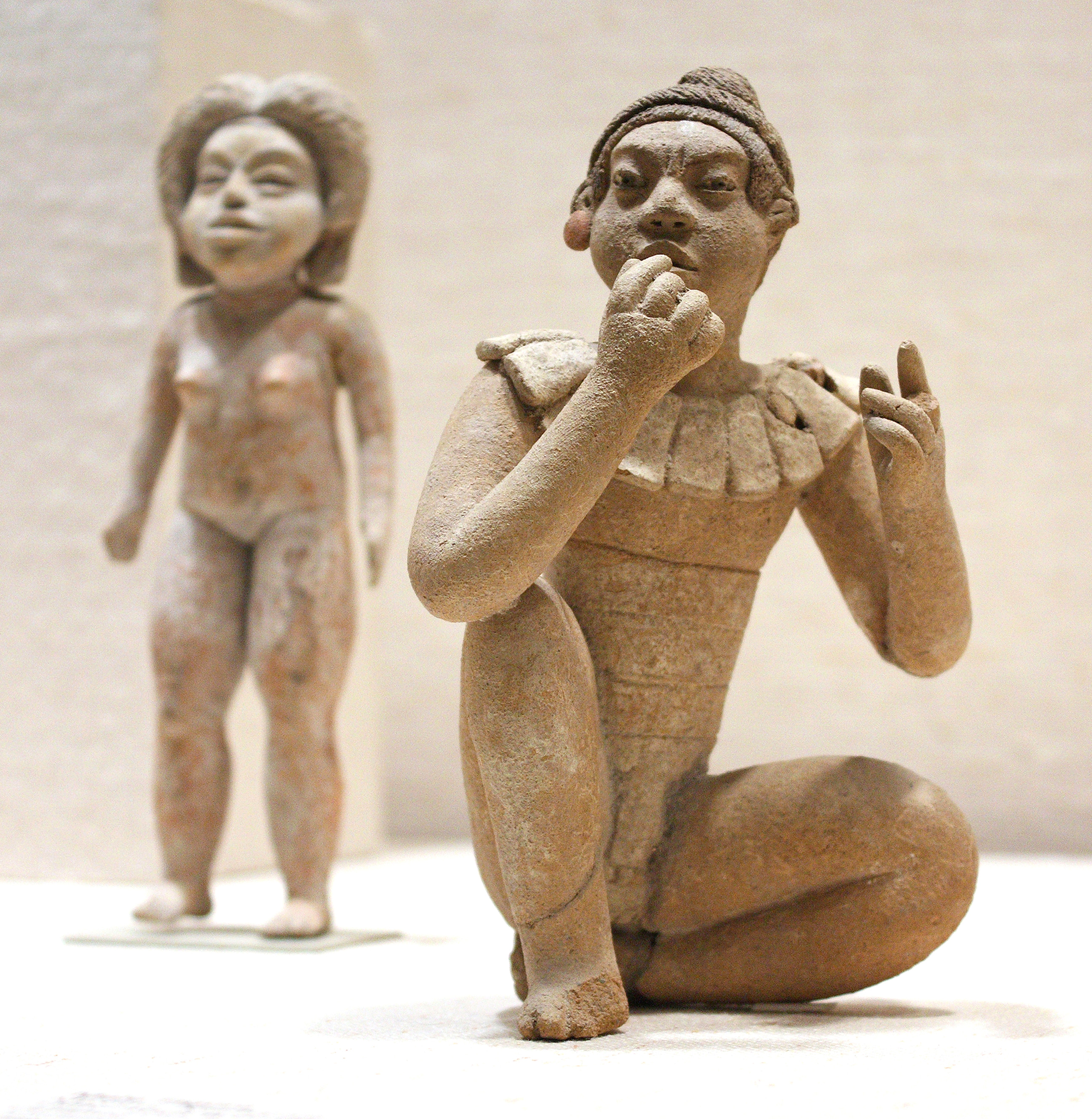
Two Formative Period Xochipala figurines, 13th–10th century BCE (?)

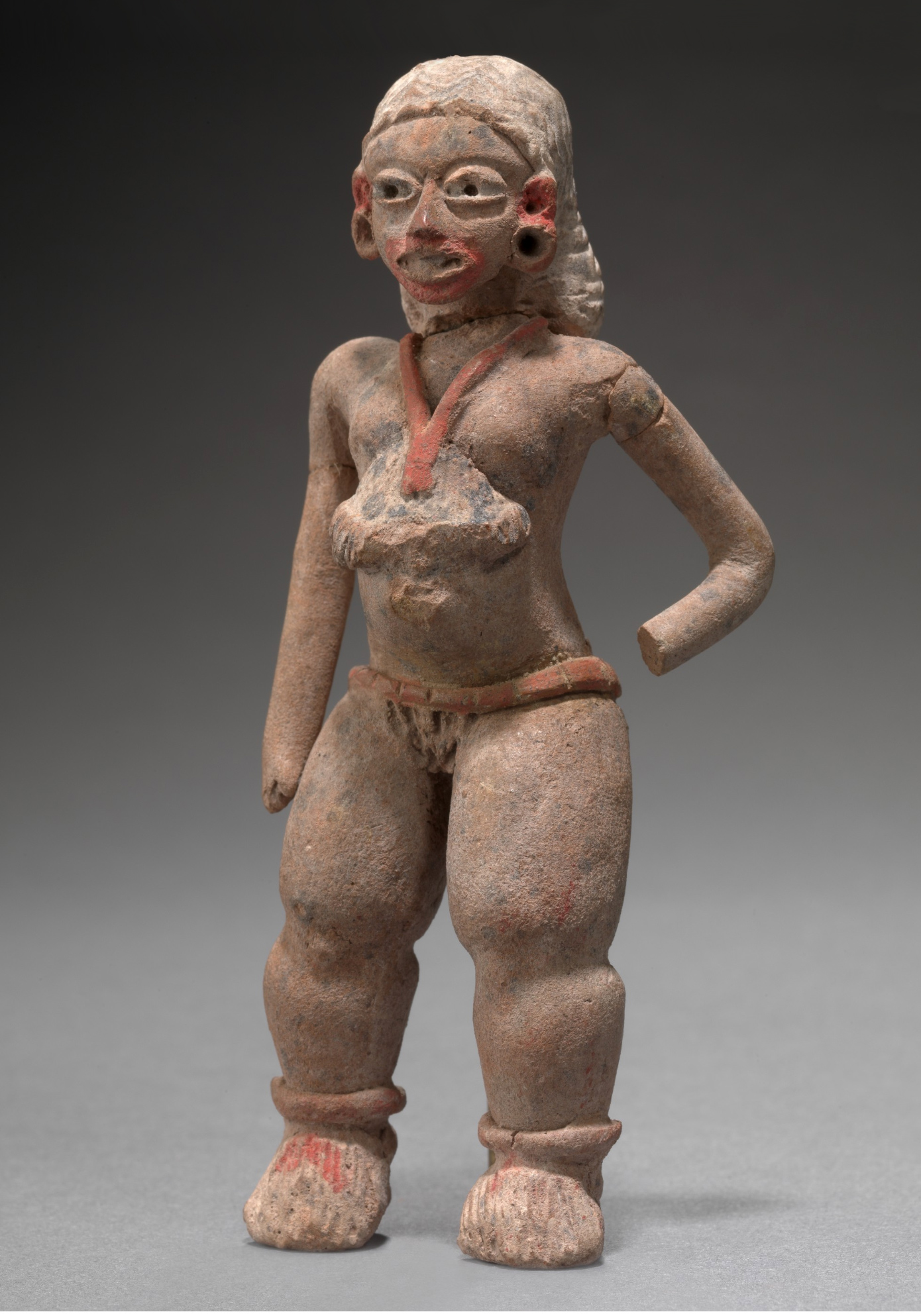
Figurine of a woman, 1200-600 BCE

The Xochipala style is represented by some of the earliest and most naturalistic Mesoamerican figurines, as well as a number of bowls intricately carved from very hard stone.

The first rediscovered Xochipala-style figurine was purchased in Guerrero in 1897 by William Niven and sold to the Peabody Museum in 1903. No Xochipala figurine has yet been found in archaeological context, only through collectors and art dealers. The earliest date assigned to any figurine is 1500 BCE but without provenance, so dating is based on stylistic and compositional characteristics.

To achieve a more realistic look, many of the figurines were first modeled without clothing, which was then draped applique-like about the body. It has been suggested that the nude figurines may have been dressed in perishable clothing.

=== Critical assessment ===
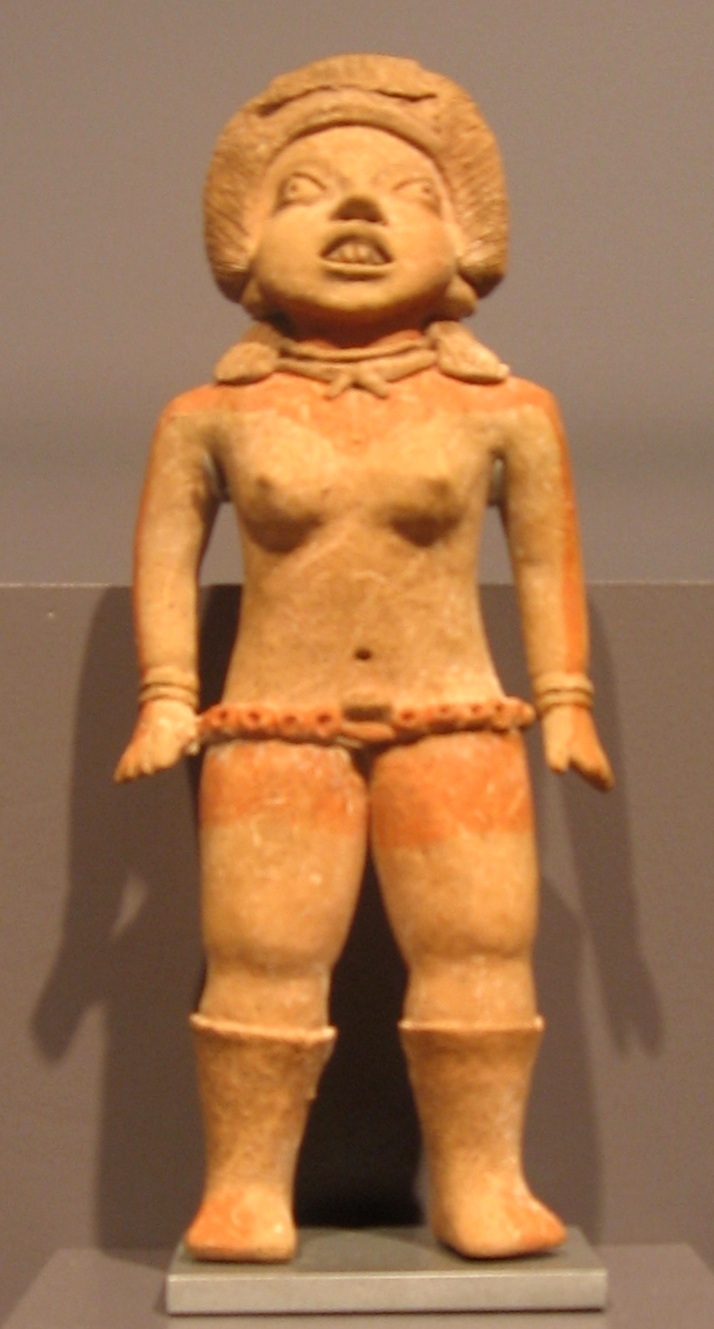
A woman, often identified as a ballplayer. 10th–9th century BCE or 15th–10th century

There is near universal praise for these early figurines:

- "Near Xochipala a number of solid clay statuettes have been found dating from about 1300 BC, but modelled with a sureness of hand, a sensitivity to three-dimensional form, and a liveliness that suggests a well-established tradition." Hugh Honour
- "Expressive gestures, naturalistic forms of hair, breasts, and plastic arms and legs make early and rare Xochipala figures among the finest ceramic works of the ancient New World". Mary Ellen Miller
- "... some of the most imaginative, lively, and naturalistic figuines yet known in Mesoamerica". David Grove
- "This small group constitutes some of the greatest miniature ceramic sculpture made in the Americas. The figures stand out in intensity and naturalism from all other works." "These primal works of superb technical virtuosity represent some of the greatest ceramic figurines in all of the vast body of Mesoamerican art." Gillett Griffin

=== Olmec ===
In his seminal 1972 book, Carlo Gay attributed the sophisticated artistry of the Xochipala figurines to a precocious culture that was the predecessor of the Gulf coast Olmecs. According to Gay, the naturalistic "Early Xochipala" figurines led over centuries to the stylised "Late Xochipala" style which in turn led to what archaeologist Gillett Griffin has called "abstracted, ... ideal," and "contrived" Olmec art.

Despite what Griffin describes as a "pure Olmec stratum", others have found few similarities between Xochipala figurines and Olmec art. David Grove, for example, finds that minor quantities of some Olmec attributes appear in Gay's "Middle Xochipala" sequence and in the stone bowls, but these attributes are otherwise missing from Xochipala art. Michael Coe, however, sees "nothing [in the Xochipala figurines or stone bowls] which would lead into the Olmec pattern". Gay's proposal is "now widely regarded as untenable".

By way of an alternate explanation of Xochipala precociousness, David Grove suggests that the earliest figurines were influenced by the "already developed and sophisticated ceramic traditions of northern South America", an idea that is not widely accepted in the archaeological community.
