= Yttrialite =

Yttrialite-(Y)
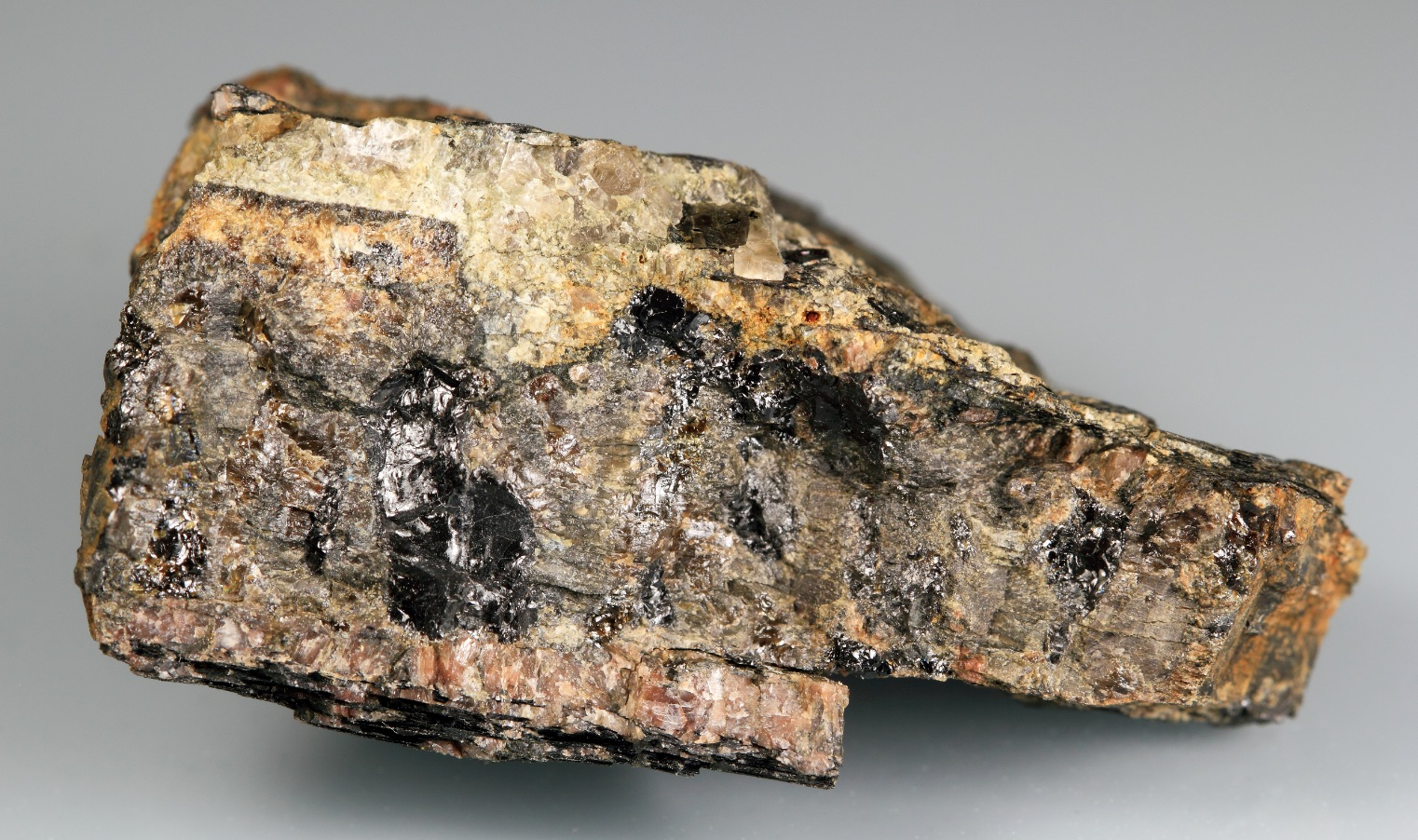
- Yttrialite-(Y) found in Finland

General
- Category: Sorosilicates
- Formula: Y_{2}Si_{2}O_{7}
- IMA symbol: Ytt-Y
- Strunz classification: 9.BC.05
- Crystal system: Monoclinic
- Crystal class: Prismatic (2/m) (same H-M symbol)
- Space group: P2_{1}/m

Identification
- Color: olive-green, brown to black
- Other characteristics: Radioactive

Yttrialite or Yttrialite-(Y) is a rare yttrium thorium sorosilicate mineral with formula: (Y,Th)_{2}Si_{2}O_{7}. It forms green to orange yellow masses with conchoidal fracture. It crystallizes in the monoclinic-prismatic crystal system. It has a Mohs hardness of 5 to 5.5 and a specific gravity of 4.58. It is highly radioactive due to the thorium content.

It is found associated with gadolinite. It was first described in 1889 for an occurrence in the Rode Ranch pegmatite on Baringer Hill, Llano County, Texas. It has also been reported from the Suishouyama pegmatite on Honshū, Japan, and from occurrences in Norway and Sweden.
