= Mexican Federal Highway 113 =

Highway in Mexico

Federal Highway 113
- Carretera federal 113

Route information
- Maintained by Secretariat of Infrastructure, Communications and Transportation
- Length: 56 km (35 mi)

Major junctions
- North end: Mexico City
- South end: Fed. 160D in Oaxtepec

Location
- Country: Mexico

Highway system
- Mexican Federal Highways; List; Autopistas
← Fed. 111	→ Fed. 115

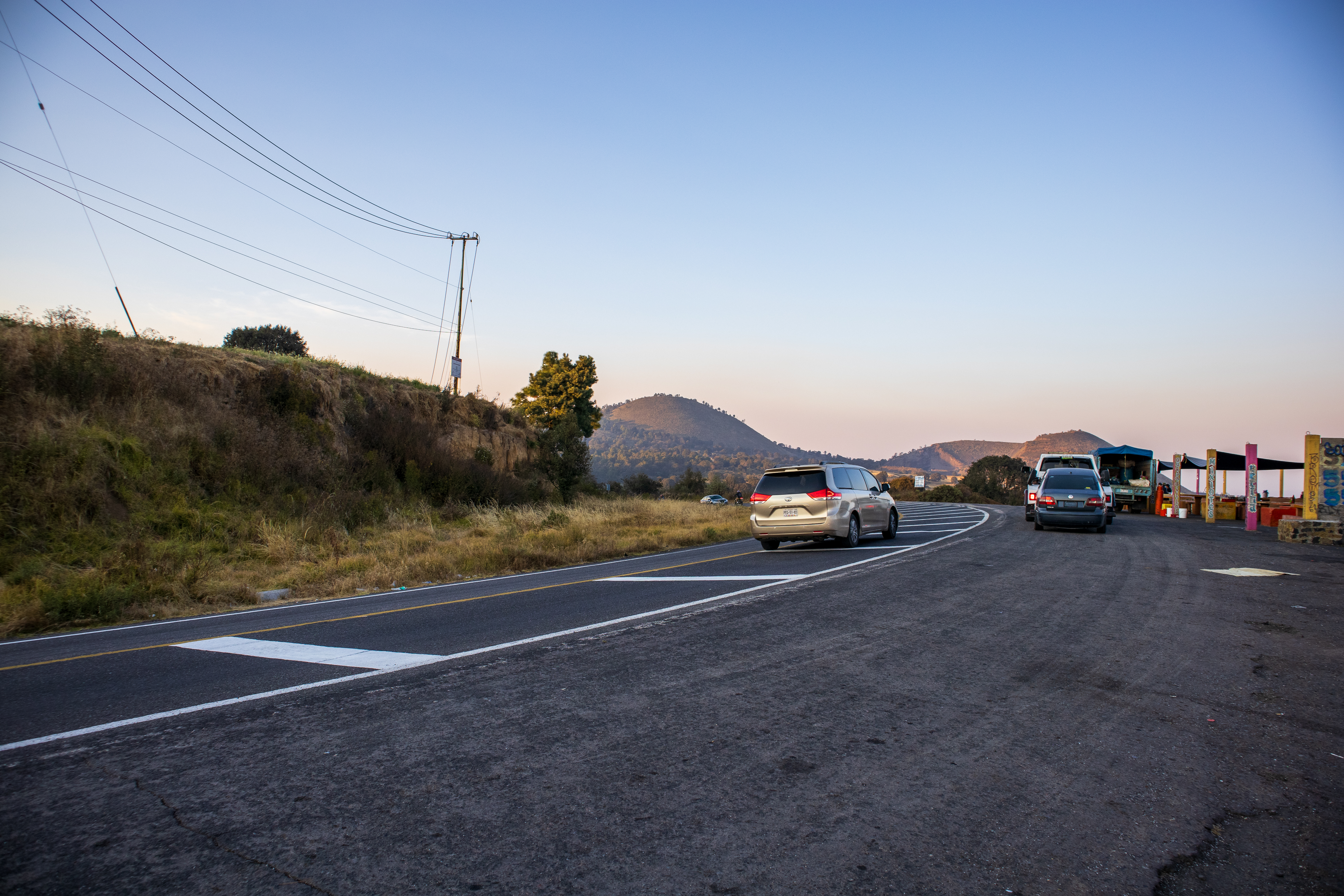
View of Federal Highway 113 Xochimilco-Oaxtepec at the La Loma viewpoint, Juchitepec.

Federal Highway 113 (Carretera Federal 113) is a Federal Highway of Mexico. The highway travels from Xochimilco, Mexico City in the north to Oaxtepec, Morelos in the south.
