= Mexican Federal Highway 115 =

Highway in Mexico

Federal Highway 115
- Carretera federal 115

Route information
- Maintained by Secretariat of Infrastructure, Communications and Transportation
- Length: 138.14 km (85.84 mi)

Major junctions
- North end: Fed. 150 in Ixtapaluca
- South end: Fed. 190 in Izúcar de Matamoros

Location
- Country: Mexico

Highway system
- Mexican Federal Highways; List; Autopistas
| ← Fed. 113 | → Fed. 116 |

Federal Highway 115 (Carretera Federal 115) is a Federal Highway of Mexico. The highway travels from Ixtapaluca, State of Mexico in the north to Izúcar de Matamoros, Puebla in the south. Federal Highway 115 is co-signed with Mexican Federal Highway 160 from Izúcar de Matamoros to north of Cuautla in Cuautlixco, Morelos.
