= Mexican Federal Highway 95D =

Toll highway in Mexico

Federal Highway 95D
- Carretera federal 95D
- Autopista México–Cuernavaca; Autopista del Sol
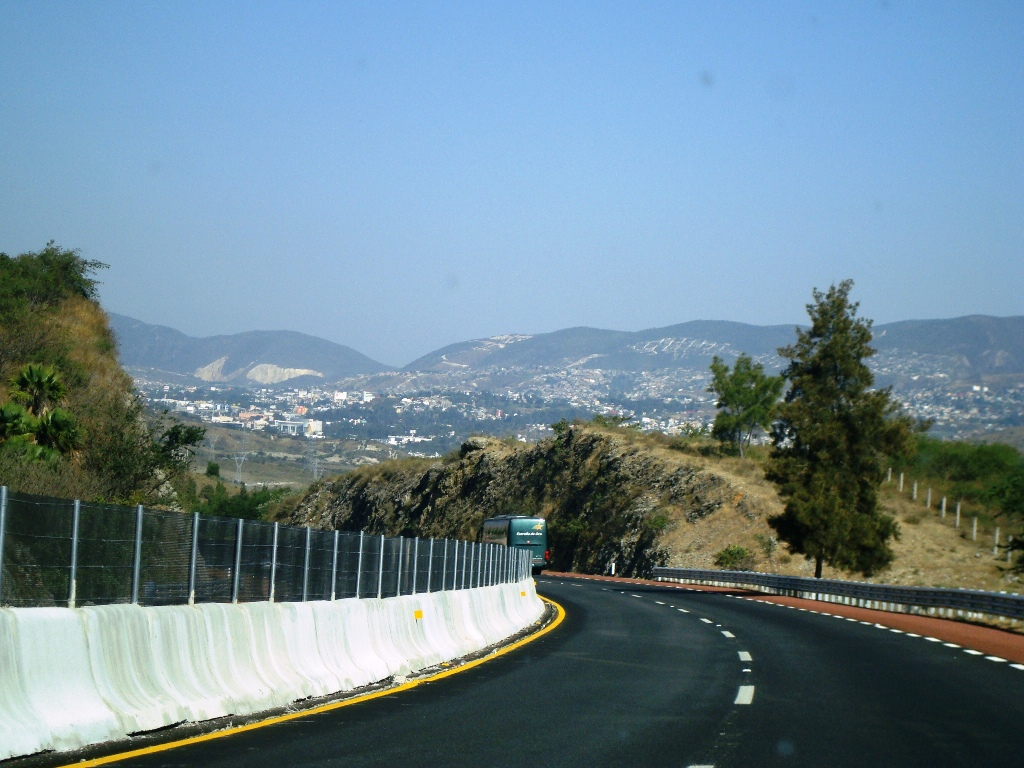

Route information
- Maintained by Caminos y Puentes Federales (except Maxitúnel); Empresas ICA (Maxitúnel)
- Existed: 1952–present

Autopista México-Cuernavaca
- Length: 80.26 km (49.87 mi)
- North end: Fed. 95 and Viaducto Tlalpan in Mexico City
- South end: Cuernavaca, Morelos

Autopista del Sol
- Length: 271.5 km (168.7 mi)
- North end: Cuernavaca, Morelos
- South end: Fed. 95 in Acapulco, Guerrero

Maxitúnel Interurbano Acapulco
- Length: 2.953 km (1.835 mi)
- North end: Fed. 95 / Fed. 200 in Acapulco, Guerrero
- South end: Fed. 200 in Acapulco, Guerrero

Location
- Country: Mexico

Highway system
- Mexican Federal Highways; List; Autopistas

Federal Highway 95D is a toll highway connecting Mexico City to Acapulco, Guerrero. Highway 95D is among the most important toll roads in the country, serving as a backbone for traffic out of Mexico City toward Morelos and tourist destinations in Guerrero.

Three segments, from north to south, comprise Federal Highway 95: the segment between Mexico City and Cuernavaca, the segment from Cuernavaca to Acapulco (commonly known as the Autopista del Sol or Sun Highway), and the Maxitúnel Interurbano Acapulco, separated from the other two segments and offering a bypass under local traffic in Acapulco.

== México–Cuernavaca ==
The first and oldest segment of Highway 95D is that running between Mexico City and Cuernavaca, which was the second toll road in the country. The original construction of the highway was performed by Compañía Constructora del Sur, S.A. de C.V., a state-controlled predecessor to Caminos y Puentes Federales, the government agency that maintains the México–Cuernavaca highway as well as the Autopista del Sol and other toll roads and bridges in Mexico.

Users have the option of entering Highway 95D from its Mexico City terminus two ways. The first is by entering from the intersection of Viaducto Tlalpan and Avenida Insurgentes, the latter of which carries Mexican Federal Highway 95. The other is by taking the 7-kilometre (4.3 mi) Second Story Interconnection (Interconexión Segundo Piso), which is a direct flyover from the Autopista Urbana Sur following Viaducto Tlalpan and the Highway 95D route as it hugs the side of the Heroico Colegio Militar. Users of both options pay a 74-peso toll for the Tlalpan toll booth, which is designated toll booth number one by Caminos y Puentes Federales and was expanded in 2016 to add seven additional toll lanes; the interconnection costs an additional 19 pesos, four for the segment operated by the government of Mexico City and another 15 for the federal segment. After the toll booth, the interconnection ends and users merge into the mainline of the highway heading south.

Highway 95D then exits the Mexico City urban area and begins to scale the mountainous terrain separating Mexico City from Cuernavaca with a maximum altitude of 2647 meters above sea level. As it heads south, it passes a rest stop at Parres, a small town within Mexico City limits, with amenities such as a Federal Police booth, restaurants and convenience stores.

At kilometer 47, the road passes into Morelos, arriving in Tres Marías 6 kilometres (3.7 mi) later after a rest stop at Covadonga. The road turns east and then makes a hairpin curve dubbed La Pera (The Pear), bending for the southwest and toward Cuernavaca. As Tres Marías has a large motorcycling community, the highway in this area is sometimes used as a motorcycle race track, with fatal consequences for those who fall off at the curve. Shortly after La Pera, Highway 95D spawns another toll road connecting to Tepoztlán and Cuautla, Mexican Federal Highway 115D.

Highway 95D enters the Cuernavaca metropolitan area east of the campus of the Universidad Autónoma del Estado de Morelos, with interchanges at the Glorieta La Paloma de la Paz monument, Avenida Vicente Guerrero, and Avenida Río Mayo near the Plaza Diana shopping center as it wraps east around the Cuernavaca metropolitan area; its interchange with the local street Plan de Ayala marks the end of Mexican Federal Highway 160. This 14.5-kilometre (9.0 mi) portion contains two express lanes in each direction, known as the Paso Express Cuernavaca; while the project was scheduled to be completed in December 2016, it was delayed four months because of issues stemming from the relocation of utilities and damage to nearby homes, and the road opened to traffic on April 1, 2017. Upon its completion, travel times through Cuernavaca decreased from 30 minutes to just 10, according to the SCT. Just three months after opening, a section of the road, swallowing a car and claiming two lives; the SCT blamed erosion and a sewer backed up with trash and water from recent rains.

== Cuernavaca–Acapulco ==
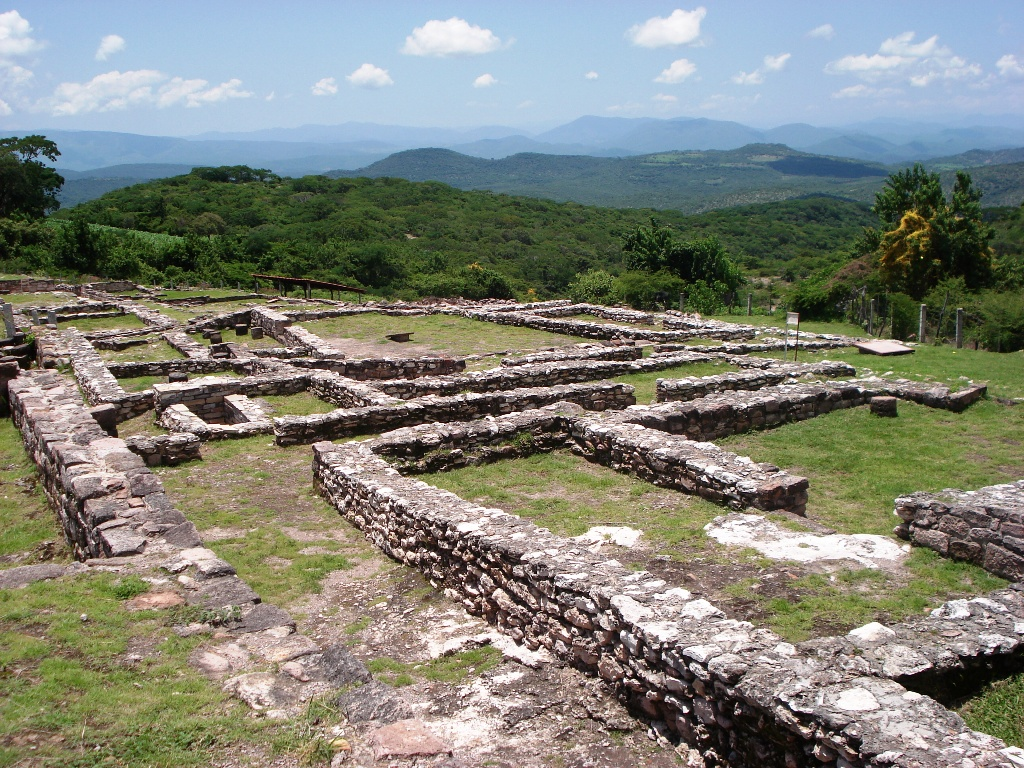
The Cuetlajuchitlán archeological site was discovered during construction of the Autopista del Sol and sits over a tunnel

On the south edge of Cuernavaca, Highway 95D and Highway 95 begin to parallel each other past communities such as Temixco. Travelers encounter the first toll booth of the Cuernavaca–Acapulco highway, commonly known as the Autopista del Sol (Sun Highway), at the exit to Emiliano Zapata, where incoming and exiting traffic are tolled in a new booth put into service in July 2016. The next interchange is the Highway to the Cuernavaca Airport, located near the ITESM Campus Cuernavaca in Xochitepec.

After a brief jog southwest punctuated by an interchange with Morelos State Route 21 at Xoxocotla, travelers on the mainline of the Autopista del Sol are tolled for the first time at the Alpuyeca toll booth, later named for Ing. Francisco Velasco Durán; the road bends around Tequesquitengo Lake and features an interchange with Morelos State Route 5 to provide access to the town of the same name, crossing into Guerrero east of Coaxitlán, Morelos. The terrain around the highway becomes increasingly rugged in Guerrero, which features five bridges for Highway 95D. The first of these is the Puente Quetzalapa, which crosses over a dip in the mountains. The first interchange in Guerrero, however, does not come until 12 kilometres (7.5 mi) after the bridge and 29 kilometres (18 mi) after entering the state, at Paso Morelos and Guerrero State Route 1.

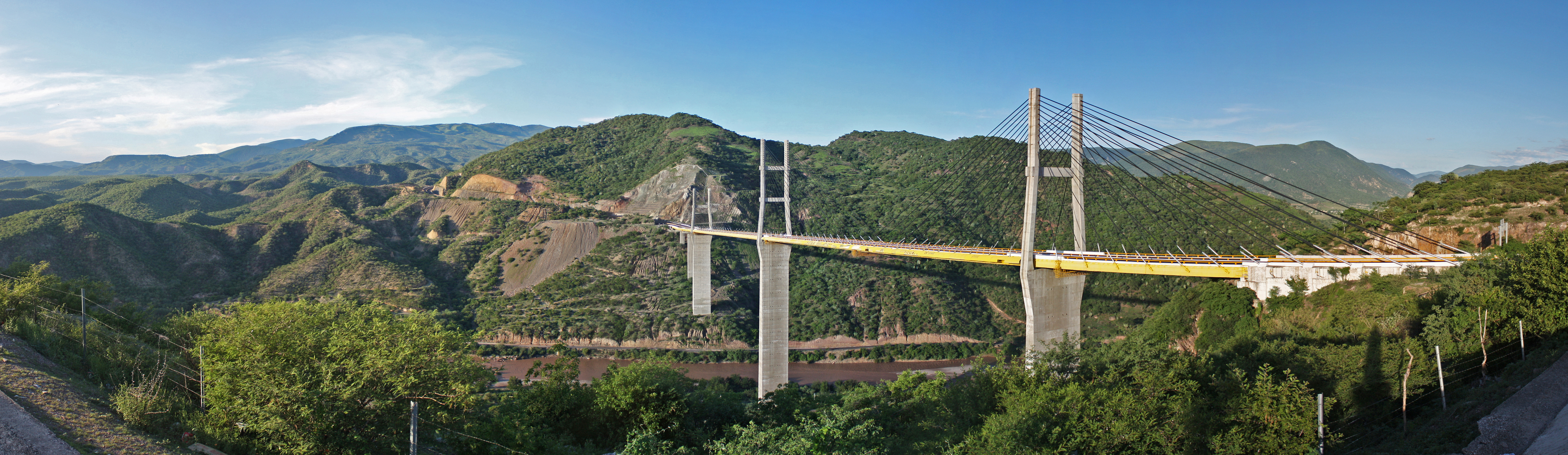
The Mezcala Bridge

As construction of the highway proceeded in 1991, an archeological site, Cuetlajuchitlán, was discovered, with settlement dating back to 800 BC; the highway travels the Los Querendes Tunnel under the site at a depth of 50 metres (160 ft), allowing for its preservation. At kilometer 212, the 891-metre (2,923 ft) Mezcala Bridge carries Highway 95D over the Mezcala River; when it opened with the highway, it was the world's tallest bridge. The Autopista del Sol route includes a total of five bridges.

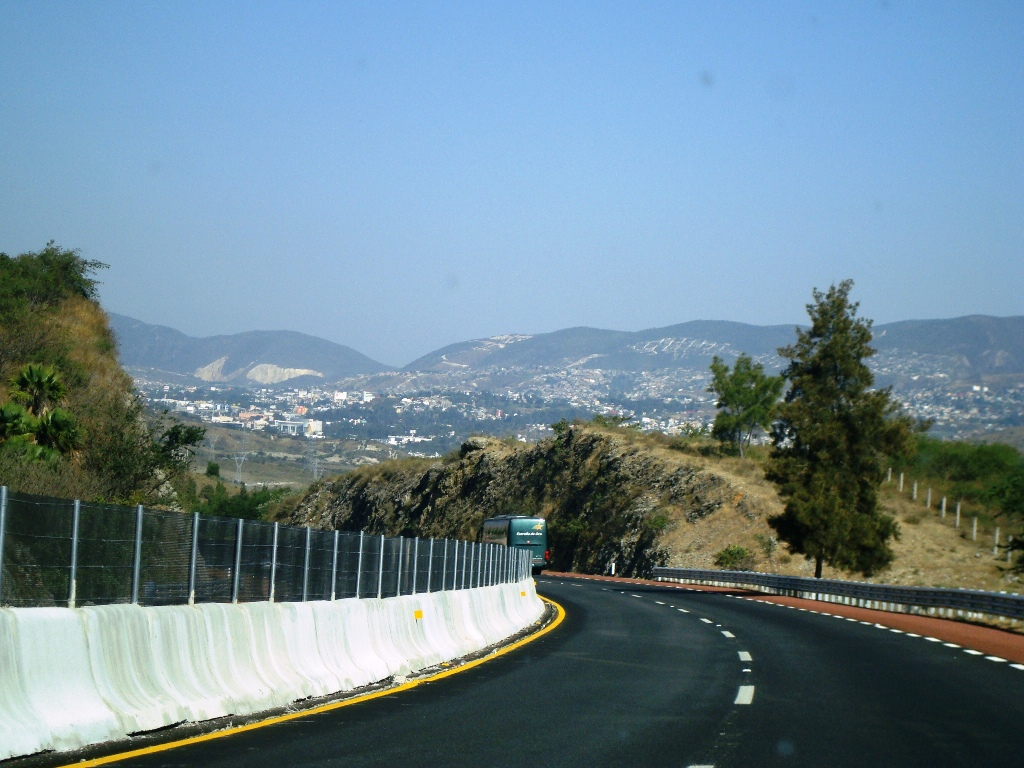
Chilpancingo comes into view along the Autopista del Sol

As the road nears Chilpancingo, it comes across a full-access interchange with Highway 95 and Highway 93D, which offer free access to Zumpango del Río and a tolled bypass to Tixtla, respectively; at this interchange, the Dr. Raymundo Abarca Alarcón General Hospital is located, providing medical services in the Chilpancingo area. The Autopista del Sol then cuts south and southeast through the Chilpancingo urban area, passing the campus of the Autonomous University of Guerrero and the offices of the Congress of Guerrero. A set of frontage roads, known as Av. Vicente Guerrero, provides interchanges at local streets, with traffic on free Highway 95 and tolled Highway 95D sharing the route. The two roads split off again in southern Chilpancingo. South of town, travelers encounter the Palo Blanco toll booth, the first in 111 kilometers on the road; continuing toward Acapulco, the highway passes the Guerrero Industrial Park before meeting another interchange at Tierra Colorada, crossing its final bridge, over the Río Papagayo, and one more tunnel before turning southwest toward Acapulco. One last toll booth awaits motorists at La Venta, immediately followed by an interchange with Guerrero State Route 200D, the tolled Viaducto Diamante, which connects travelers to the Playa Diamante area southeast of the main city. Soon after, Highway 95 merges into Highway 95D, ending the Autopista del Sol on the northeast edge of Acapulco. Motorists who travel the length of the entire road pay a toll of 324 pesos as of January 2017.

=== History ===
Construction of the Autopista del Sol was completed in 1993. The road, initially slated to cost 800 million pesos, ended up costing 2.2 billion, primarily because of the Puente Mezcala, which was designed in conjunction with a dam that was never built.

In 2007, Gutsa, a contractor selected to maintain and rehabilitate a 60-kilometer stretch of the highway, failed to meet its contractual obligations, which resulted in the contract being terminated and the SCT taking control of the road improvements.

== Maxitúnel Interurbano Acapulco ==
The Maxitúnel, also signed Highway 95D, opened November 26, 1996 after construction began in 1994. The tunnel is 2,953 metres (9,688 ft) long and was designed to reduce the travel time from Acapulco to Mexico City by 25 minutes, allowing motorists to avoid local traffic. It was built by a consortium of Grupo Mexicano de Desarrollo, Empresas ICA (Ingenieros Civiles Asociados), and Triturados Basálticos y Derivados. The most recent toll for the tunnel, effective as of January 15, 2016, is 101 pesos for non-residents and 37 pesos for residents.

In 2013, the state government called on the tunnel's operator, the Autovía division of ICA, to temporarily not charge vehicles on the road after Hurricane Ingrid and Hurricane Manuel struck the region and stranded tourists.
