= Mexican Federal Highway 160 =

Highway in Mexico

Federal Highway 160
- Carretera federal 160

Route information
- Maintained by Secretariat of Infrastructure, Communications and Transportation
- Length: 112.39 km (69.84 mi)

Major junctions
- East end: Fed. 190 in Izúcar de Matamoros
- West end: Fed. 95D in Cuernavaca

Location
- Country: Mexico

Highway system
- Mexican Federal Highways; List; Autopistas
← Fed. 150	→ Fed. 162

Federal Highway 160 (Carretera Federal 160) is a Federal Highway of Mexico. The highway travels from Cuernavaca, Morelos in the west to Izúcar de Matamoros, Puebla in the east. Federal Highway 160 is co-signed with Mexican Federal Highway 115 from Izúcar de Matamoros to north of Cuautla in Cuautlixco, Morelos.
