= Mexican Federal Highway 115D =

Toll highway in Mexico

Federal Highway 115D
- Carretera federal 115D
- Libramiento Amecameca-Nepantla

Route information
- Maintained by Caminos y Puentes Federales
- Length: 23.4 km (14.5 mi)

Major junctions
- North end: Fed. 115 in Amecameca, State of Mexico
- South end: Fed. 115 north of Atlatlahucan, Morelos

Location
- Country: Mexico

Highway system
- Mexican Federal Highways; List; Autopistas

MFederal Highway 115D is a toll highway primarily located in the State of Mexico. It serves as a bypass of the cities of Amecameca and Nepantla in the State of Mexico for traffic traveling Mexican Federal Highway 115. The road is operated by Caminos y Puentes Federales, which charges cars 42 pesos to travel Highway 115D.

The road's southern terminus, south of Nepantla, is in the municipality of Atlatlahucan, Morelos.
