= Mexican Federal Highway 295 =

Highway in Mexico

Federal Highway 295
- Carretera federal 295

Route information
- Maintained by Secretariat of Infrastructure, Communications and Transportation
- Length: 252.3 km (156.8 mi)

Major junctions
- South end: Fed. 184 in Felipe Carrillo Puerto
- Fed. 180 in Valladolid; Fed. 176 in Tizimín
- North end: Calle 21 in Río Lagartos

Location
- Country: Mexico
- States: Quintana Roo, Yucatán

Highway system
- Mexican Federal Highways; List; Autopistas
← Fed. 293	→ Fed. 307

Federal Highway 295 (Spanish: La Carretera Federal 295, Fed. 295) is a toll-free part of the federal highway corridors (los corredores carreteros federales) of Mexico.

The highway runs from Felipe Carrillo Puerto, Quintana Roo north to Río Lagartos, Yucatán. For most of its length, Fed. 295 is a two-lane highway with narrow or no shoulders.

== Route description ==
Lengths
	km	mi
ROO	100.8	62.6
YUC	151.5	94.1
Total	252.3	156.8

=== Quintana Roo ===
Fed. 295 begins in Felipe Carrillo Puerto at an intersection with Fed. 184 (Avenida Lázaro Cárdenas del Río). The highway travels in a northeast direction along Calle 66 for a few blocks before turning northwest. Fed. 295 leaves the town and crosses over Libramiento Felipe Carrillo Puerto (Fed. 307D) without any connection between the two highways. Leaving the Felipe Carrillo Puerto area, the highway travels in a generally northwestern direction through rural areas, passing through several small towns and villages. Fed. 295 turns northeast near the Tihosuco-Dziuche state highway before turning east near the town of Tihosuco. The highway travels east through the town before turning back into a northeast direction approximately 5 km east of the town. Fed. 295 then turns north at Tepich before entering the state of Yucatán about 6 km north of the town.

=== Yucatán ===
Fed. 295 enters Yucatán near the village of X-Tohbil. The highway mostly travels through rural areas in the southern part of the state for about 45 km before reaching the city of Valladolid. Fed. 295 travels through the city on a pair of one-way streets, with northbound traffic traveling along Calle 40 and southbound traffic on Calle 42. The highway intersects Fed. 180, also traveling on a pair of one-way streets, in the city's downtown area; the four streets serve as the boundaries for Parque Principal Francisco Cantón Rosado, a city park that features the La Mestiza fountain in the center. Fed. 295 meets Fed. 180D (Autopista Mérida-Cancún) just north of the city at a cloverleaf interchange. Fed. 295 resumes it rural course, traveling through the towns of Temozón and Calotmul. The highway enters Tizimín, where it serves as the eastern terminus of Fed. 176 and the western terminus of SH 15. Just north of the city, the highway has a spur route, also signed as Fed. 295, that travels to the town of Panabá. Fed. 295 resumes it rural course, traveling through areas with thick vegetation, then enters Río Lagartos, inside the Ría Lagartos Biosphere Reserve. The highway's northern terminus is in the town at the Calle 21 intersection, with the roadway continuing north as Calle 10.

== Junction list ==
State	Municipality	Location	km	mi	Destinations	Notes
Quintana Roo	Felipe Carrillo Puerto	Felipe Carrillo Puerto	0.0	0.0	Fed. 184 (Avenida Lázaro Cárdenas del Río)	Southern terminus
			100.8– 0.0	62.6– 0.0	Quintana Roo–Yucatán state line	
Yucatán	Tixcacalcupul	No major junctions				
Yucatán	Chichimilá	No major junctions				
Yucatán	Tixcacalcupul	No major junctions				
Yucatán	Chichimilá	No major junctions				
Yucatán	Tixcacalcupul	No major junctions				
Yucatán	Tekom	Tekom	33.7	20.9	To Fed. 180 – Mérida, Cuncunul	
Yucatán	Chichimilá	No major junctions				
Yucatán	Valladolid		44.1	27.4	To Fed. 180 – Mérida, Chemax, Cancún	Access via Anillo Periférico de Valladolid
Yucatán	Valladolid	Valladolid	47.6	29.6	Fed. 180 east (Calle 41)	One-way couplet
Yucatán	Valladolid	Valladolid	47.7	29.6	Fed. 180 west (Calle 39)	One-way couplet
Yucatán	Valladolid		51.8	32.2	To Fed. 180 – Mérida, Cancún	Interchange; access via Anillo Periférico de Valladolid
Yucatán	Valladolid		53.3	33.1	Fed. 180D – Mérida, Cancún	
Yucatán	Temozón	No major junctions				
Yucatán	Espita	No major junctions				
Yucatán	Temozón	No major junctions				
Yucatán	Calotmul	No major junctions				
Yucatán	Tizimín		93.9	58.3	To Fed. 176 / Fed. 180 – Progreso, Mérida	
Yucatán	Tizimín	Tizimín	99.1	61.6	Fed. 176 west (Calle 51) – Mérida	Eastern terminus of Fed. 176
Yucatán	Tizimín	Tizimín	99.2	61.6	SH 15 east (Calle 47)	Western terminus of SH 15
Yucatán	Tizimín		104.2	64.7	To Fed. 176 – Mérida	
Yucatán	Tizimín		105.3	65.4	Fed. 295 north – Panabá, San Felipe	Southern terminus of Fed. 295 Spur
Yucatán	Panabá	No major junctions				
Yucatán	Río Lagartos	No major junctions				
Yucatán	Panabá	No major junctions				
Yucatán	Río Lagartos	Río Lagartos	151.5	94.1	Calle 21	Northern terminus; roadway continues north as Calle 10
1.000 mi = 1.609 km; 1.000 km = 0.621 mi
