= Tulum, Quintana Roo =

Tulum Tulu'um
- Locality
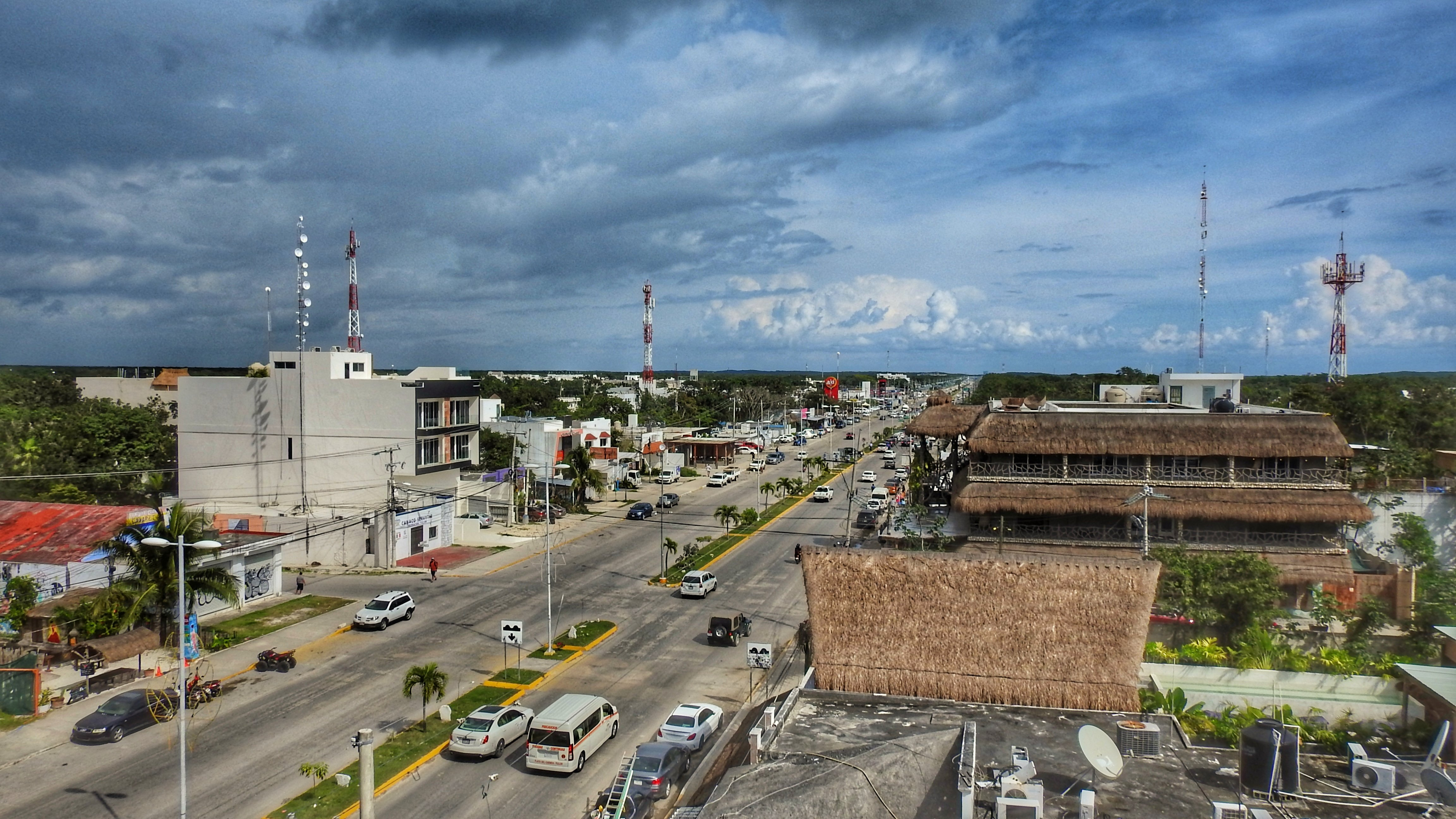
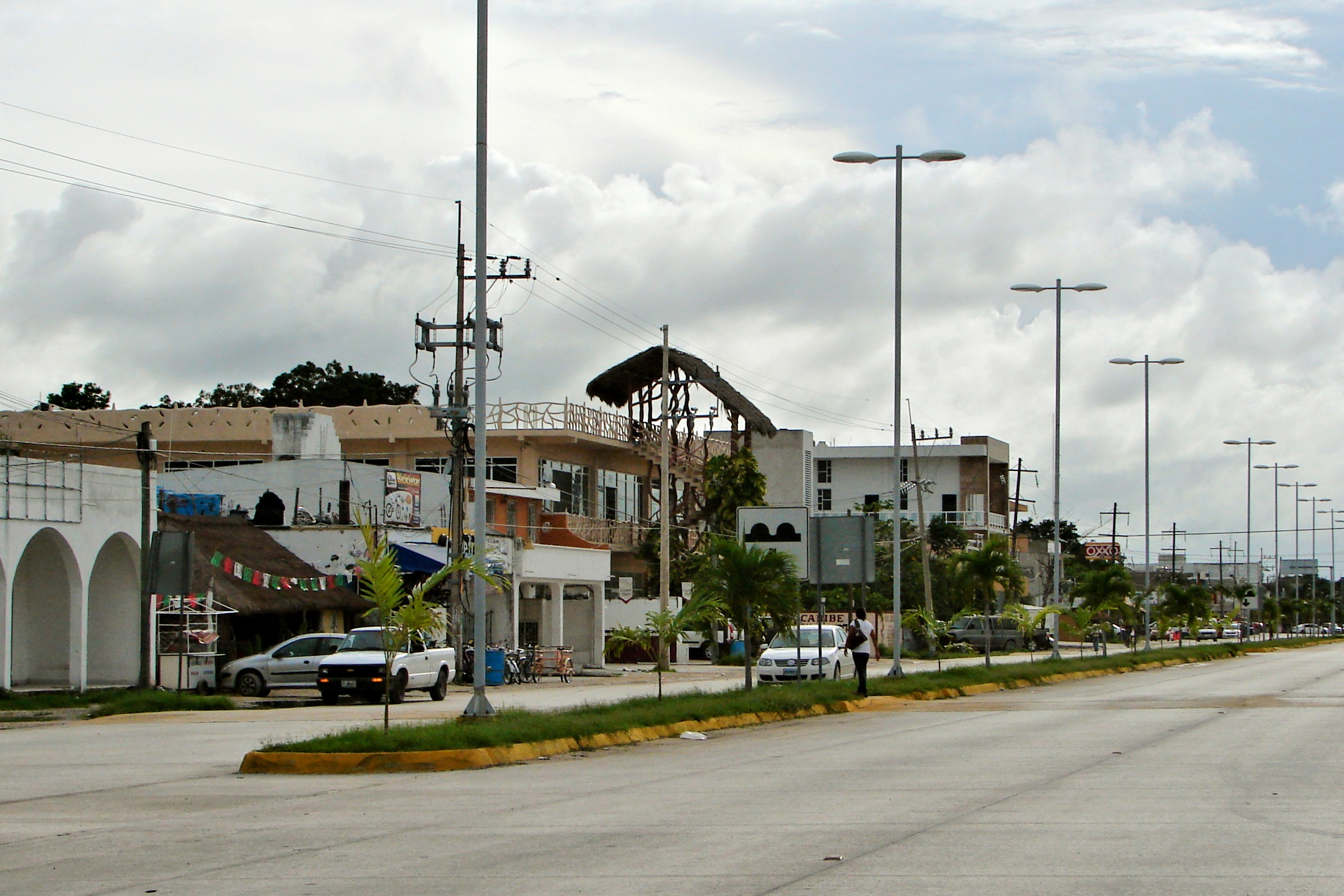
- Street in Tulum Tulum along Highway 307
- Nickname: Tulum Pueblo
- Interactive map of Tulum
- Location within Mexico
- Coordinates: 20°12′43″N 87°27′57″W
- Country: Mexico
- State: Quintana Roo
- Municipality: Tulum
- Founded: 1860–1870
- Founder: María Uicab

Government
  - Municipal President: Diego Castañón Trejo (Morena)
- Elevation: 5 m (16 ft)

Population (2020)
  - Total: 33,374
  - Municipality: 46,271
- Demonym: Tulumense
- Time zone: UTC-5 (Southeast (US Eastern))
- Postal Code: 77780
- Area code: 984
- INEGI code: 230090001
- Vehicle registration number: 23
- Website: www.tulum.gob.mx

Tulum (pronounced [tuˈlum]) is the largest community in the municipality of Tulum, Quintana Roo, Mexico. It is located on the Caribbean coast of the state, near the site of the archaeological ruins of Tulum.

== History ==
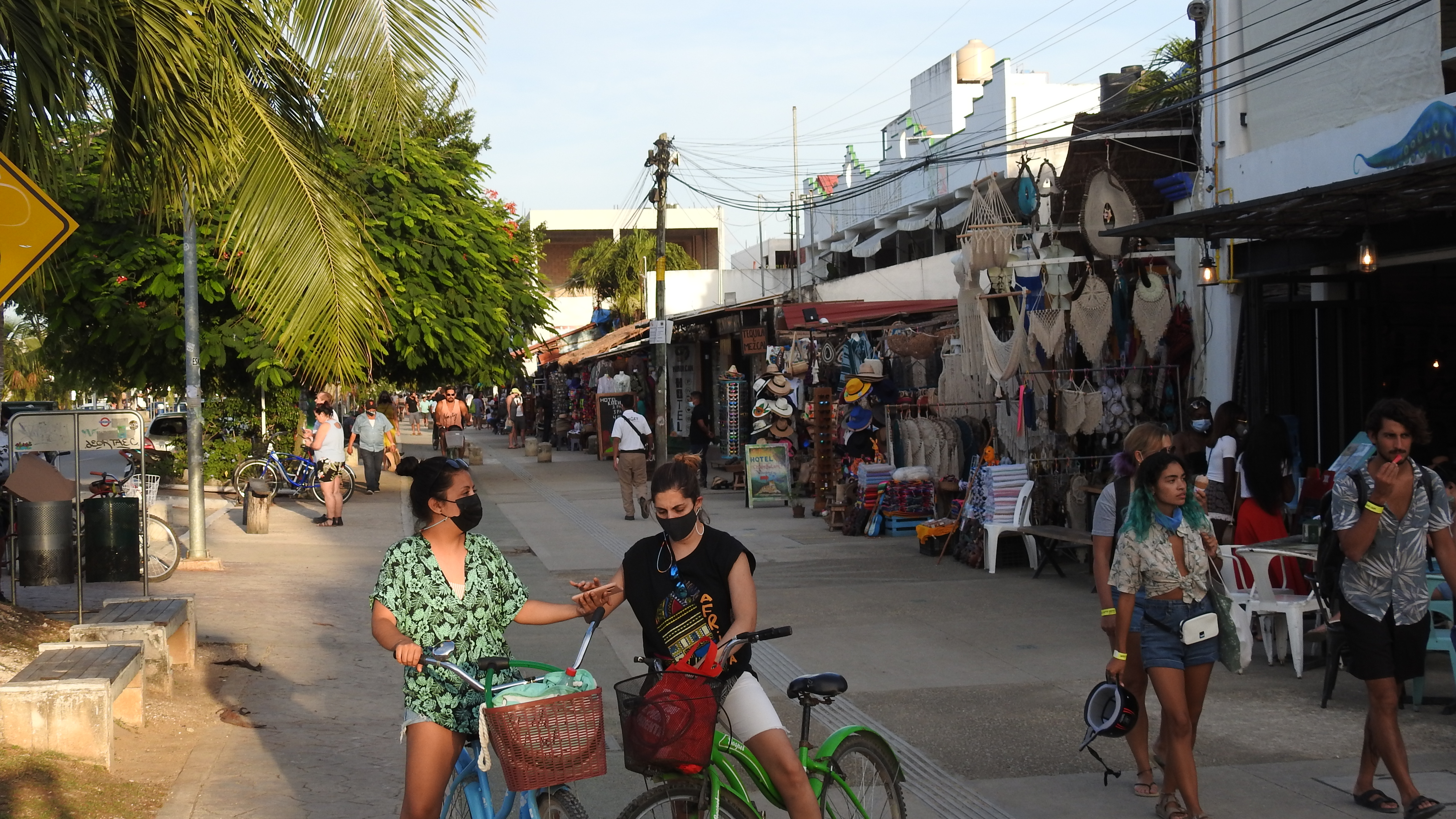
Tulum Avenue, main street in town

The town traces its origins to the Caste War of Yucatán (1847–1901), when Maya rebels established communities in the region. According to local accounts, the settlement was founded between 1860 and 1870 by María Uicab, a Maya leader. For decades, Tulum remained a small fishing village and a crossing point for chicle harvesters. The construction of Highway 307 in the 1970s began to connect the area to the outside world, but significant growth did not occur until the 1990s when tourism to the ruins increased.

As recently as the early 1990s, Tulum was a quiet village 2 km (1.5 mi) from the archaeological site, and tourism outside of the ruins was limited to a few small shops and simple cabanas on the beach. As of the 2020 census, population of Tulum municipality has grown to 46,721 permanent inhabitants with the addition of a number of residential developments in the jungle areas nearest Tulum's downtown. With the rapid increase in tourism, vacation rentals, small hotels and hostels, as well as restaurants and bars, the town is getting more and more popular. Grocery stores, boutiques, bicycle rentals, gyms, tour operators, banks, ATMs, internet cafes, and various other commercial stores are available in Tulum town. Spanish Language Schools are popular in Tulum.

Since 13 March 2008, the town is head of the newly founded municipality (município), the ninth in Quintana Roo.

On 1 December 2023, Tulum International Airport was opened by President Andrés Manuel López Obrador.

== Zona Hotelera Tulum ==
Two kilometers from the town center, the "hotel zone" of boutique hotels and restaurants on the Tulum beach has grown to over 70 hotels. Most of them are cabañas built in the traditional Maya style with thatched palm roofs though there are some more high end hotels as well. There are many new restaurants, particularly on the jungle side of the road, some of which have received significant praise in the international press. There are also a few beach clubs and public beaches. Due to the increasing popularity of the place, the inexpensive cabañas with hammocks that could be rented some years ago are not available anymore, the prices now have gone very high, especially on the "hotel zone". Most accommodations remain rustic-style, but electricity in the "hotel zone" arrived in 2020 with most of the hotels and main restaurants now making use of it.

== Tourist attractions ==
While the archaeological site of Tulum is the most famous attraction, the town of Tulum serves as a gateway to numerous natural and cultural sites. The nearby Sian Ka'an Biosphere Reserve, a UNESCO World Heritage Site, offers tours of its mangroves, lagoons, and wildlife. The region is also known for its cenotes (natural sinkholes), such as Gran Cenote, Dos Ojos, and Ik Kil, which are popular for swimming and diving. The town's proximity to the Riviera Maya makes it a convenient base for visiting destinations like Cobá, Akumal, and Xel-Ha. Within the town itself, visitors can explore local art galleries, boutique shops, and a growing culinary scene that blends traditional Mexican cuisine with international influences.

== Transportation ==
Tulum is served by the Tulum railway station on the Tren Maya.

Tulum is accessible via Mexican Federal Highway 307, which runs through the town and connects it to Cancún to the north and Chetumal to the south. The Tulum International Airport (TQO) began operations in December 2023, offering domestic and international flights. Within the town, transportation options include local buses, colectivos (shared vans), taxis, and bicycle rentals. For travel to beachside hotels and nearby destinations, many visitors rely on private shuttle services. Local transportation agencies provide transfers to major Riviera Maya points of interest.
