= Mexican Federal Highway 180D =

Toll highway in Mexico

Federal Highway 180D
- Carretera federal 180D

Route information
- Maintained by Secretariat of Communications and Transportation

Location
- Country: Mexico

Highway system
- Mexican Federal Highways; List; Autopistas

Federal Highway 180D is the toll highways paralleling Highway 180 in seven separate segments of highway. Three are in Veracruz:, the Libramiento de Cardel, the highway from Cardel to Veracruz, and the Nuevo Teapa-Cosoleacaque highway. Four segments exist beyond Veracruz: one between Agua Dulce and Cárdenas, Tabasco, facilitating a connection from the city of Coatzacoalcos in Veracruz; a bypass of Villahermosa; one connecting Champotón to Campeche City, Campeche; and another connecting the cities of Mérida, Yucatán, and Cancún, Quintana Roo. An additional segment, connecting the latter highway to Playa del Carmen, is officially part of Highway 180D, but is signed as Highway 305D.

== Libramiento de Cardel ==
Libramiento de Cardel
- Location: Fed. 180 north of Cardel, Veracruz to Fed. 180 west of Cardel, Veracruz
- Length: 2.5 km (1.6 mi)

The bypass of José Cardel is considered part of Federal Highway 180D. This 2.5-kilometre (1.6 mi) road connects two separate roads signaged as Highway 180, the Tamarindo-Cardel highway and the mainline between Poza Rica and the port of Veracruz. A significant portion of this bypass has been on hold since 2010, even though the Veracruz state government spent 154 million pesos on it between 2010 and 2015. In December 2016, the SCT announced it would attempt to resume the Libramiento de Cardel and other unfinished road projects with the goal of finishing them by December 1, 2018, the end of Enrique Peña Nieto's presidency.

== Cardel-Veracruz ==
Autopista Cardel-Veracruz
- Location: Fed. 180 in Cardel, Veracruz to Fed. 180 in Veracruz
- Length: 28.5 km (17.7 mi)

The highway between Cardel and the city of Veracruz, which opened on May 1, 1994, is operated by the Veracruz state government. The mainline toll is 55 pesos for cars; this segment does not have a free alternative.

== Nuevo Teapa-Cosoleacaque ==
Autopista Nuevo Teapa-Cosoleacaque
- Location: Fed. 145D at Cosoleacaque, Veracruz to Fed. 180 at Nuevo Teapa, Veracruz
- Length: 34 km (21 mi)

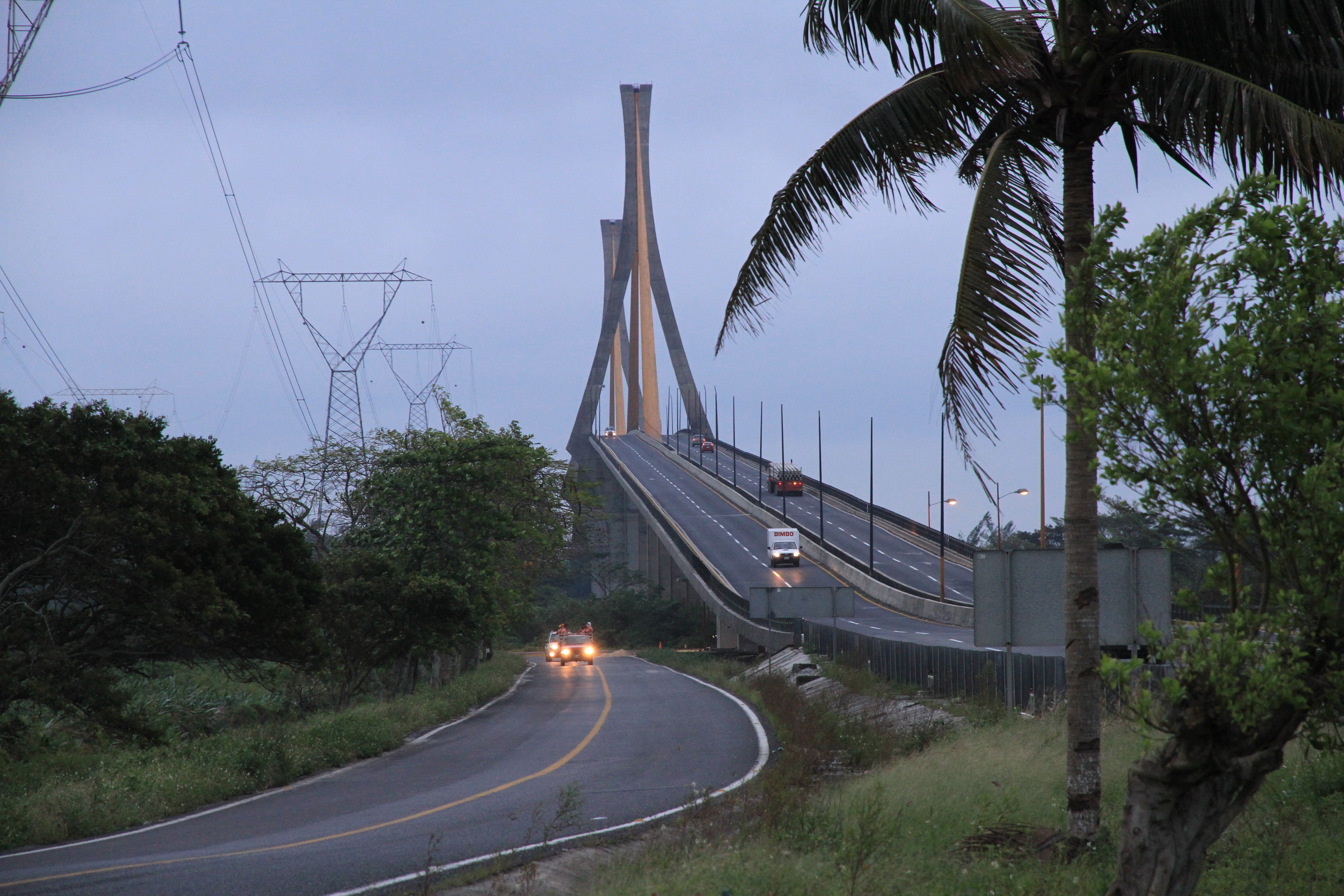
The western approach to the Puente Antonio Dovalí Jaime

The Highway 180D designation is also applied to a toll road between Nuevo Teapa and Cosoleacaque in the southern portion of Veracruz. The road picks up where the Federal Highway 145D designation leaves off at Cosoleacaque and carries passengers 34 kilometres (21 mi) to Highway 180 at Nuevo Teapa, crossing the Coatzacoalcos River on the Puente Ing. Antonio Dovalí Jaime (Coatzacoalcos II), which opened to traffic in 1984. One toll plaza booth exists on the road, to the east of the bridge; it charges cars a toll of 19 pesos.

== Coatzacoalcos-Cárdenas ==
Autopista Coatzacoalcos-Cárdenas (Agua Dulce-Cárdenas)
- Location: Fed. 180 at Agua Dulce, Tabasco, to Fed. 180 west of Cárdenas, Tabasco
- Length: 54.112 km (33.624 mi)

The only segment signaged Highway 180D in Tabasco begins almost immediately after crossing from Veracruz, at Agua Dulce. The Sánchez Magallanes toll plaza booth is located at one area where Highway 180 crosses the road, the only junction on the highway. Highway 180 transitions back into Highway 180D, ending the toll road, due west of Cárdenas. Cars are charged 65 pesos to travel the entire roadway and 32 pesos to travel either half.

The CAPUFE-operated road opened in mid-1996 and has a length of 54.112 kilometres (33.624 mi). In 2014, a spill of some 80,000 liters of oil prompted the closure of the toll road.

== Libramiento de Villahermosa ==
Libramiento de Villahermosa
- Location: Fed. 180 west of Villahermosa to Fed. 180 east of Villahermosa
- Length: 23.7 km (14.7 mi)

The Libramiento de Villahermosa, bypassing Tabasco's largest city, opened on November 25, 2016. It is operated by Operadora de Autopistas de Villahermosa, S.A. de C.V. Cars are charged 52 pesos to use the entirety of the road.

== Champotón-Campeche ==
Autopista Champotón-Campeche
- Location: Fed. 180 (Periférico Pablo García y Montilla) south of Campeche City to Fed. 180 south of Villa Madero, Campeche
- Length: 39.5 km (24.5 mi)

The Champotón-Campeche highway is operated by Caminos y Puentes Federales (CAPUFE) and has a total length of 39.5 kilometres (24.5 mi). Cars are tolled 63 pesos to travel the entire route, 26 for the Villa Madero-Seybaplaya segment and 38 for the Seybaplaya-Campeche segment.

=== Route description ===
Highway 180D begins south of Campeche City, absorbing the local road Maestros Campechanos and immediately intersecting the Campeche Beltway (Periférico Pablo García y Montilla) with a full cloverleaf. Proceeding southwest, the next interchange is at Seybaplaya and is immediately followed by a toll plaza booth, the only one on the road. The road ends south of Villa Madero, and traffic proceeds down Highway 180 to Champotón.

=== History ===
In 2015, one lane of a toll plaza booth was rendered inoperable after a trailer's brakes failed.

== Mérida-Cancún ==
Autopista Mérida-Cancún (Autovía del Mayab)
- Location: Fed. 180 at Kantunil, Yucatán, to Fed. 180 southwest of Cancún, Quintana Roo
- Length: 241 km (150 mi)
- Existed: December 23, 1991–present

Federal Highway 180D, also known in this stretch as the Autopista Mérida-Cancún or the Autovía del Mayab, is operated by Consorcio del Mayab, a unit of Empresas ICA which is also the concessionaire for Federal Highway 305D, a 44-kilometre (27 mi) spur route to Playa del Carmen. 8,000 cars a day use the toll road.

=== Route description ===
Highway 180D begins east of Mérida, at Kantunil, splitting off from its non-toll counterpart, Federal Highway 180. Almost immediately, it has an interchange at the southern end of Yucatán State Route 53, connecting to Izamal, and an option to merge back onto Highway 180 toward Holca. It proceeds east-southeast through rural Yucatán, with a toll plaza booth north of Pisté. It bypasses Valladolid, with access to the town provided by a full cloverleaf interchange with Highway 295. To the west is an oasis with a Pemex gas station and restaurants. It then edges to the east-northeast, roughly paralleling Highway 180 for the rest of its length.

Highway 180D crosses into Quintana Roo north of Nuevo X-can in Lázaro Cárdenas Municipality. East of here is its interchange with Highway 305D and its toll extension, connecting to Quintana Roo State Route 5 to the north and Playa del Carmen to the southeast. A toll plaza booth is located immediately east of the Highway 305D interchange. After the spur to Playa del Carmen, the road parallels Highway 180 until its merges with other roads. Travelers heading eastbound have the option to merge with non-toll Highway 180, which becomes Avenida López Portillo in Cancún, or to make a right turn and follow Quintana Roo State Route 180 toward Highway 307 with access to the Cancún International Airport.

=== History ===
The Autopista Mérida-Cancún was formally opened on December 23, 1991, by President Carlos Salinas de Gortari. Operation of the road was a joint venture between Fomento de Infraestructura Turística, S.A. de C.V. (Fomintur) and Consorcio del Mayab. In 2011, Fomintur was declared behind on its payments, resulting in its dissolution. Ultimately, ICA was awarded the contract to operate the road.

A provision in its concession allowed it to build a spur to Playa del Carmen, and in 2014, this spur, legally considered part of Highway 180D but signaged as Highway 305D (El Tintal-Playa del Carmen), opened, shortening travel times between the state of Yucatán and Playa del Carmen. As a result of the opening of the new road, the toll plaza was relocated 21 kilometers.

In 2013, 200 teachers took over one of the highway's toll plaza booths, refusing to charge passing vehicles.

In February 2017, Consorcio del Mayab raised tolls on the road. Vehicles are now charged a toll of 165 pesos between Mérida and Valladolid and 285 pesos between Valladolid and Cancún. Even prior to the toll increases, the highway was the second most expensive toll road in Mexico.
