= Tekom =

Tekom may refer to:

- Tekom Municipality
- Tekom Technologies
- tekom Europe e.V., the European Association for Technical Communication
