= Mexican Federal Highway 178 =

Highway in Mexico

Federal Highway 178
- Carretera federal 178

Route information
- Maintained by Secretariat of Communications and Transportation
- Length: 37 km (23 mi)

Major junctions
- East end: Dzilam de Bravo
- West end: Fed. 176 in Cansahcab

Location
- Country: Mexico
- State: Yucatán

Highway system
- Mexican Federal Highways; List; Autopistas
← Fed. 176	→ Fed. 179

Federal Highway 178 (Carretera Federal 178) is a Federal Highway of Mexico. The highway travels from Dzilam de Bravo, Yucatán in the east to Cansahcab, Yucatán in the west.
