= Mexican Federal Highway 130D =

Toll highway in Mexico

Federal Highway 130D
- Carretera federal 130D
- Autopista Tihuatlán-Tuxpan; Autopista Gutiérrez Zamora-Tihuatlán

Route information
- Maintained by Caminos y Puentes Federales
- Length: 67.789 km (42.122 mi)

Major junctions
- North end: Puente Tuxpan in Tuxpan, Veracruz
- Fed. 132D / Fed. 180 in Tihuatlán, Veracruz
- South end: Fed. 180 in Totomoxtle, Veracruz

Location
- Country: Mexico
- State: Veracruz

Highway system
- Mexican Federal Highways; List; Autopistas

Federal Highway 130D is a toll highway connecting Tuxpan, Veracruz to Gutiérrez Zamora, Veracruz. Its northern portion serves as the northern terminus of the México-Tuxpan highway corridor. The route is maintained and operated by Caminos y Puentes Federales.

== Route description ==
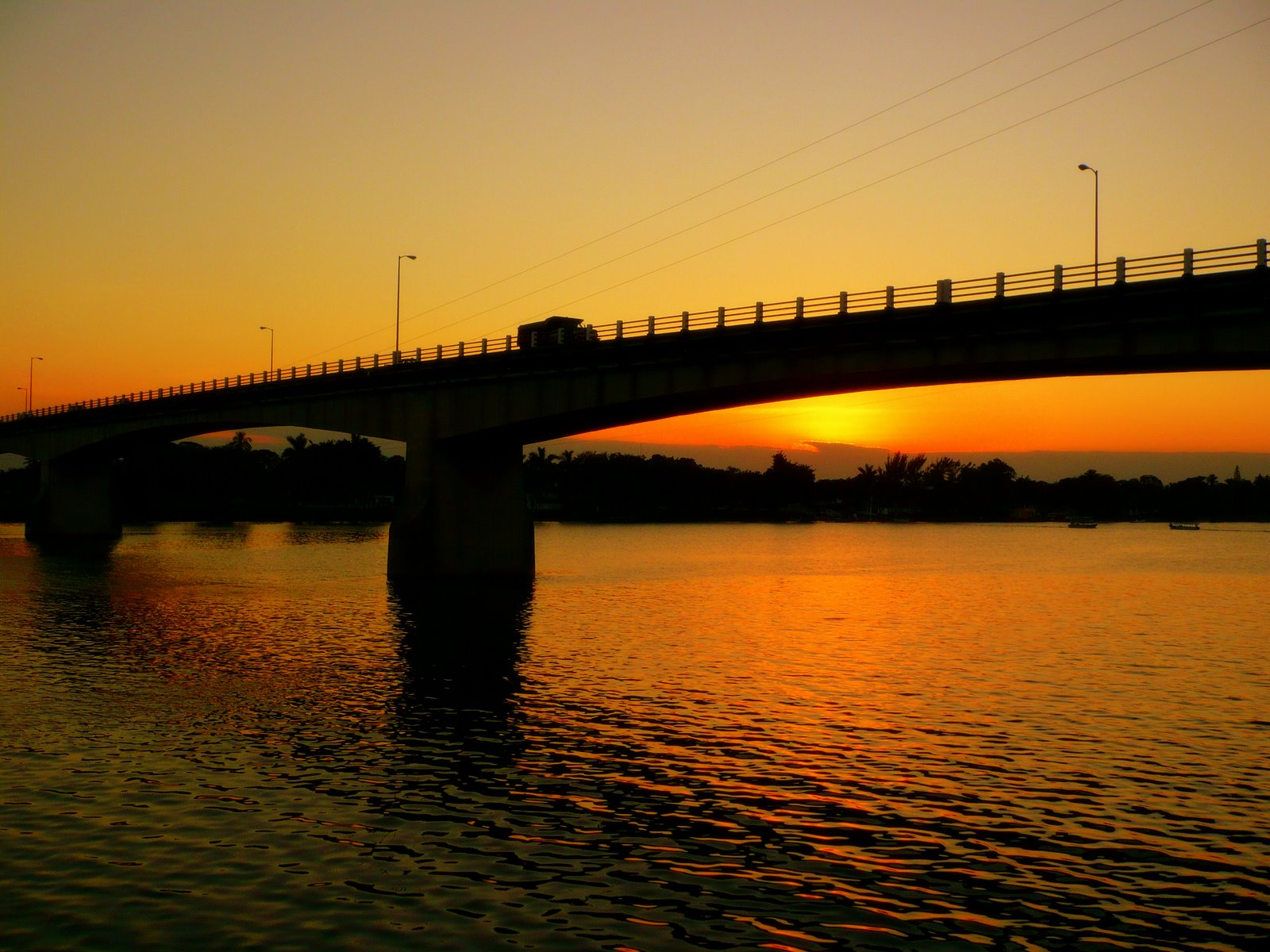
The Tuxpan Bridge

Highway 130D begins in the north with the Puente Tuxpan, crossing the Pantepec River. It is a toll bridge, combined with the 37.5-kilometre (23.3 mi) highway; users pay 37 pesos just before meeting the interchange to Gutiérrez Zamora. Travelers can continue south to the Tihuatlán interchange with Mexican Federal Highway 180, where the designation changes to Mexican Federal Highway 132D, or turn off toward Gutiérrez Zamora.

The 47.296 kilometres (29.388 mi) Tuxpan-Gutiérrez Zamora segment serves as a northeastern bypass of Poza Rica, ending at Highway 180 between Papantla de Olarte and Gutiérrez Zamora. At the southern terminus, a CAPUFE toll plaza at Totomoxtle charges users 37 pesos.
