= Mexican Federal Highway 305D =

Toll highway in Mexico

Federal Highway 305D
- Carretera federal 305D
- Autopista El Tintal-Playa del Carmen; Autopista Nuevo Xcan-Playa del Carmen

Route information
- Maintained by Consorcio del Mayab, S.A. de C.V.
- Length: 44 km (27 mi)
- Existed: 2014–present

Major junctions
- North end: Fed. 180D at El Tintal, Q. Roo
- South end: Fed. 307 at Playa del Carmen, Q. Roo

Location
- Country: Mexico
- State: Quintana Roo

Highway system
- Mexican Federal Highways; List; Autopistas

Federal Highway 305D (Carretera Federal) is a toll highway in Quintana Roo. It serves as a spur of Federal Highway 180D (Mérida-Cancún) to Playa del Carmen, creating a direct connection between Yucatán and Playa del Carmen and avoiding detours through Cancún or Tulum.

Federal Highway 305D was built and is operated by Consorcio del Mayab, a unit of Empresas ICA which is also the concessionaire for Federal Highway 180D. The toll is 75 pesos.

Federal Highway 305D is signaged as such through its entire route, although officially part of Federal Highway 180D.

== Route description ==
Federal Highway 305D begins at a junction along Federal Highway 180D at El Tintal, between Ignacio Zaragoza and Valladolid Nuevo in Lázaro Cárdenas Municipality, absorbing a toll road connecting the route to Quintana Roo State Route 5. It then proceeds southeast to Playa del Carmen, becoming the local street Avenida Luis Donaldo Colosio. This local street connects to Federal Highway 307, allowing access to other communities along the Riviera Maya.

The speed limit on Federal Highway 305D is 110 kilometers per hour.

== History ==
Consorcio del Mayab constructed Federal Highway 180D with a concessional proviso allowing it to build a spur to Playa del Carmen. Construction of a road covering this route had been proposed in 2000 but the Inter-American Development Bank denied a request for credit. A new proposal was made in 2010 though delays occurred due to environmental conditions imposed by SEMARNAT.

The project construction cost was 1.283 billion pesos and was formally inaugurated by President Enrique Peña Nieto on November 26, 2014. The project also included a tolled extension north of Federal Highway 180D, not part of the federal highway, to Cedral; this 10-kilometre (6.2 mi) portion improves the connection to Quintana Roo State Route 5, which ends at Holbox. The toll for this segment is 17 pesos.

In August 2015, a collapse of the Federal Highway 307 near Iberostar Grand Hotel Paraiso cut off transit between Cancún and Playa del Carmen. This prompted Autobuses de Oriente to reroute its intercity buses covering that route through the new Federal Highway 305D, and the Secretariat of Communications and Transportation temporarily suspended tolls on the road until Federal Highway 307 was open to traffic.
