= Cansahcab =

Town in the Mexican state of Yucatán

- Municipal Seat
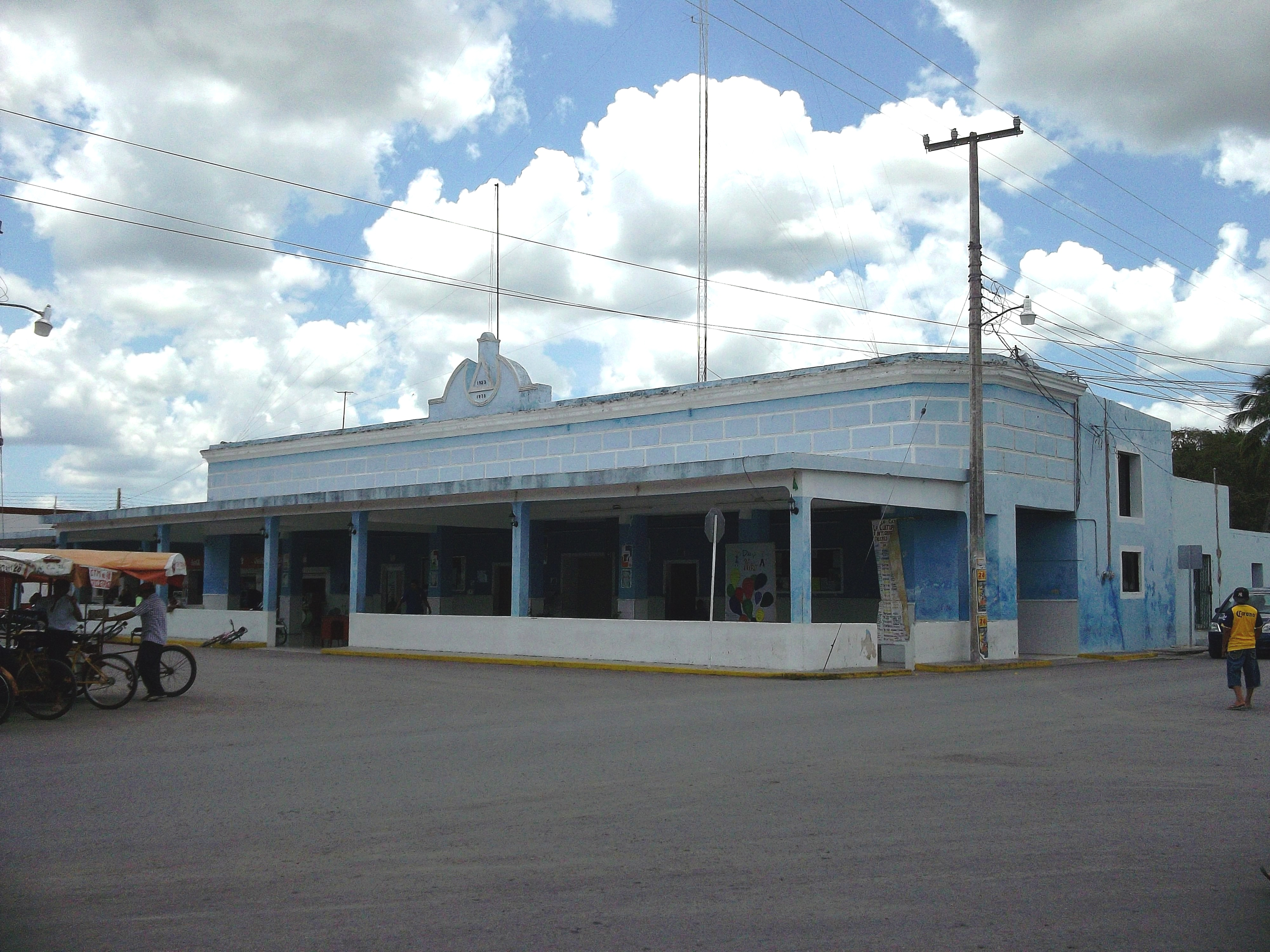

- Location within Yucatán (state)
- Coordinates: 21°9′26″N 89°6′7″W
- Country: Mexico
- State: Yucatán
- Municipality: Cansahcab

Area
  - Total: 146.9 km^{2} (56.7 sq mi)
- Elevation: 6 m (20 ft)

Population (2010)
  - Total: 4,580
- Time zone: UTC-6 (Central Standard Time)
- Postal code (of seat): 92394
- Area code: 991
- INEGI code: 310090001

Cansahcab is a town and the municipal seat of the Cansahcab Municipality, Yucatán in Mexico.
