= Mexican Federal Highway 176 =

Highway in Mexico

Federal Highway 176
- Carretera federal 176

Route information
- Maintained by Secretariat of Infrastructure, Communications and Transportation
- Length: 167.14 km (103.86 mi)

Major junctions
- East end: Fed. 295 in Tizimín
- West end: Mérida

Location
- Country: Mexico
- State: Yucatán

Highway system
- Mexican Federal Highways; List; Autopistas
← Fed. 175	→ Fed. 178

Federal Highway 176 (Carretera Federal 176) is a Federal Highway of Mexico. The highway travels from Tizimín, Yucatán in the east to Mérida, Yucatán in the west.
