= Mexican Federal Highway 175 =

Highway in Mexico

Federal Highway 175
- Carretera federal 175

Route information
- Maintained by Secretariat of Infrastructure, Communications and Transportation
- Length: 579.35 km (359.99 mi)

Major junctions
- North end: Fed. 180 in Buenavista
- South end: Puerto Ángel

Location
- Country: Mexico

Highway system
- Mexican Federal Highways; List; Autopistas
← Fed. 172	→ Fed. 176

Federal Highway 175 (Carretera Federal 175) is a Federal Highway of Mexico. The highway travels from Buenavista, Veracruz in the north to Puerto Ángel, Oaxaca in the south. The highway crosses Mexican Federal Highway 200 before reaching the Pacific Ocean at Puerto Ángel at its southern terminus.
