= Mexican Federal Highway 179 =

Highway in Mexico

Federal Highway 179
- Carretera federal 179

Route information
- Maintained by Secretariat of Communications and Transportation
- Length: 238.7 km (148.3 mi)

Major junctions
- North end: Fed. 147 in Santiago Sochiapan
- South end: Fed. 190 in San Pablo de Villa Mitla

Location
- Country: Mexico

Highway system
- Mexican Federal Highways; List; Autopistas
← Fed. 178	→ Fed. 180

Federal Highway 179 (Carretera Federal 179) is a Federal Highway of Mexico. The highway travels from north of Xochiapan, Veracruz in Santiago Sochiapan municipality in the north to San Pablo de Villa Mitla, Oaxaca in the south. Much of the median of the highway remains unpaved.
