= María Uicab =

María Uicab was a priestess and Maya leader, born in Yucatán in the 19th century. She flourished during the Caste War of Yucatán. She was also known by the nicknames Patron Saint and Queen of Tulum. It seems that her original name could have been María Petrona Uicab and that she was married three times, first in 1860.

She was influential in the Cruzoob religious movement. A charismatic woman, she had a skill for making her followers obey her. She did this by appealing to their superstitions. In a temple in the city of Tulum, she supposedly interpreted "the voices of three crosses." The crosses stood upon an altar, and Uicab claimed to be able to interpret their commands. After 1875, her name stopped appearing in written sources; it seems that by that time, she had died. Even so, the end of her life is a mystery. One possibility is that she was assassinated by her own followers in the Cruzoob movement; another is that she died of old age.

== Bibliography ==
- Rosado Rosado, Georgina; Santana Rivas, Landy (2008). "María Uicab: reina, sacerdotisa y jefa militar de los mayas rebeldes de Yucatán (1863-1875)" [María Uicab: queen, priestess, and military leader of the Maya rebels of Yucatán (1863-1875)]. Mesoamérica (in Spanish). 29 (50). ISSN 0252-9963.
- Rugeley, Terry (2001). Maya Wars: Ethnographic Accounts from Nineteenth-century Yucatán. Google Books: University of Oklahoma. ISBN 9780806133553.
- Villalobos González, Martha Herminia (2006). El bosque sitiado: asaltos armados, concesiones forestales y estrategias de resistencia durante la Guerra de Castas (in Spanish). Google Books: Centro de Investigación y Estudios Superiores en Antropología Social. ISBN 9789707017627.
