= Chichimilá Municipality =

Municipality in the Mexican state of Yucatán

Chichimilá
- Municipality
- Region 6 Oriente #021

- Location of the Municipality in Mexico
- Coordinates: 20°37′51″N 88°13′02″W
- Country: Mexico
- State: Yucatán

Government
  - Type: 2012–2015
  - Municipal President: Joel Eduardo Rosado Tuz

Area
  - Total: 358.59 km^{2} (138.45 sq mi)
- Elevation: 26 m (85 ft)

Population (2010)
  - Total: 7,952
- Time zone: UTC-6 (Central Standard Time)
- INEGI Code: 009
- Major Airport: Merida (Manuel Crescencio Rejón) International Airport
- IATA Code: MID
- ICAO Code: MMMD

Chichimilá Municipality (In the Yucatec Maya Language: “hard to see or recognize”) is a municipality in the Mexican state of Yucatán containing 358.59 km^{2} of land and located roughly 170 km southeast of the city of Mérida.

== History ==
It is unknown which chieftainship the area was under prior to the arrival of the Spanish. After the conquest the area became part of the encomienda system with the records indicating Micaela Alcocer rented her encomienda to Manuel Argaís y Noguera and Juana de Argaís y Noguera.

Yucatán declared its independence from the Spanish Crown in 1821 and in 1825, the area was assigned to the Valladolid region. During the Caste War of Yucatán Manuel Antonio Ay, a local chieftain, was one of the main promoters of the rebellion by the indigenous people against the government. It was designated as its own municipality in 1875.

== Governance ==
The municipal president is elected for a three-year term. The town council has seven councilpersons, who serve as Secretary and councilors of urban development, education, health, beautification and trash disposal, public monuments and nomenclature.

== Communities ==
The head of the municipality is Chichimilá, Yucatán. There are 40 populated places in the municipality with the most important being Celtún, Chan-Xcail, Chay, Dzitox, Monte Verde, San Jose Cruz, San Pedro, Santa Cruz, and Villahermosa. The significant populations are shown below:

Community	Population
Entire Municipality (2010)	7,952
Celtún	140 in 2005
Chan-Xcail	474 in 2005
Chichimilá	4985 in 2005
Dzitox	742 in 2005
San Pedro	328 in 2005
Villahermosa	150 in 2005

== Local festivals ==
Every year from the 1 to the 18 February the town holds a traditional village festival and in October, a celebration for its patron saint, St. Francis of Assisi.

== Tourist attractions ==
- Convent of the Assumption, built in the sixteenth century
- Cenote Aktun
- Cenote Chan mú ul
- Cenote Chan Pich
- Cenote Chay
- Cenote Chichimilá
