= Tixcacalcupul Municipality =

Municipality in the Mexican state of Yucatán

Tixcacalcupul
- Municipality
- Region 6 Oriente #092

- Location of the Municipality in Mexico
- Coordinates: 20°32′12″N 88°16′13″W
- Country: Mexico
- State: Yucatán
- Mexico Ind.: 1821
- Yucatán Est.: 1824

Government
  - Type: 2012–2015
  - Municipal President: Leonardo Chay Ek

Area
  - Total: 1,164.98 km^{2} (449.80 sq mi)
- Elevation: 27 m (89 ft)

Population (2010)
  - Total: 6,665
  - Density: 5.721/km^{2} (14.82/sq mi)
  - Demonym: Umanense
- Time zone: UTC-6 (Central Standard Time)
- INEGI Code: 092
- Major Airport: Merida (Manuel Crescencio Rejón) International Airport
- IATA Code: MID
- ICAO Code: MMMD

Tixcacalcupul Municipality (Yucatec Maya: "Two mouths of Cupul's well") is a municipality in the Mexican state of Yucatán containing 1,164.98 km^{2} of land and is located roughly 180 kilometres (110 mi) southeast of the city of Mérida.

== History ==
There is no accurate data on when the town was founded, but it was a settlement before the conquest and was located in the chieftainship of Cupules. After colonization, the area became part of the encomienda system with various encomenderos, beginning with Francisco Manrique in 1549, passing to Juan de Cárdenas in 1579, Francisco Mallén in 1607 and later to Francisco Mallén de Rueda. In 1645 the encomenderos were Gaspar de Ayala Pacheco and Francisca Dorantes y Solís and in 1686 passed to Pedro Pardo de Lagos.

Yucatán declared its independence from the Spanish Crown in 1821 and in 1825 the area was assigned to the Valladolid Municipality. During the Caste War of Yucatán, a battle occurred here in which almost all of the inhabitants were massacred by government troops. In 1918 the area became its own municipality.

== Governance ==
The municipal president is elected for a three-year term. The town council has four councilpersons, who serve as Secretary and councilors of public works, sports, education and health.

== Communities ==
The head of the municipality is Tixcacalcupul, Yucatán. The municipality has 28 populated places besides the seat including Ekpedz, Mahas, Poop, San José and X-Tohbil. The significant populations are shown below:

| Community | Population |
|---|---|
| Entire Municipality (2010) | 6,665 |
| Ekpedz | 1235 in 2005 |
| Mahas | 377 in 2005 |
| Poop | 437 in 2005 |
| San José | 466 in 2005 |
| Tixcacalcupul | 3207 in 2005 |
| X-Tohbil | 307 in 2005 |

== Local festivals ==
Every year on 15 June the town celebrates the feast of Saint Bartholomew the Apostle.

== Tourist attractions ==
- Archeological site at Xai Bei
