= Calotmul =

Town in the Mexican state of Yucatán

- Municipal Seat
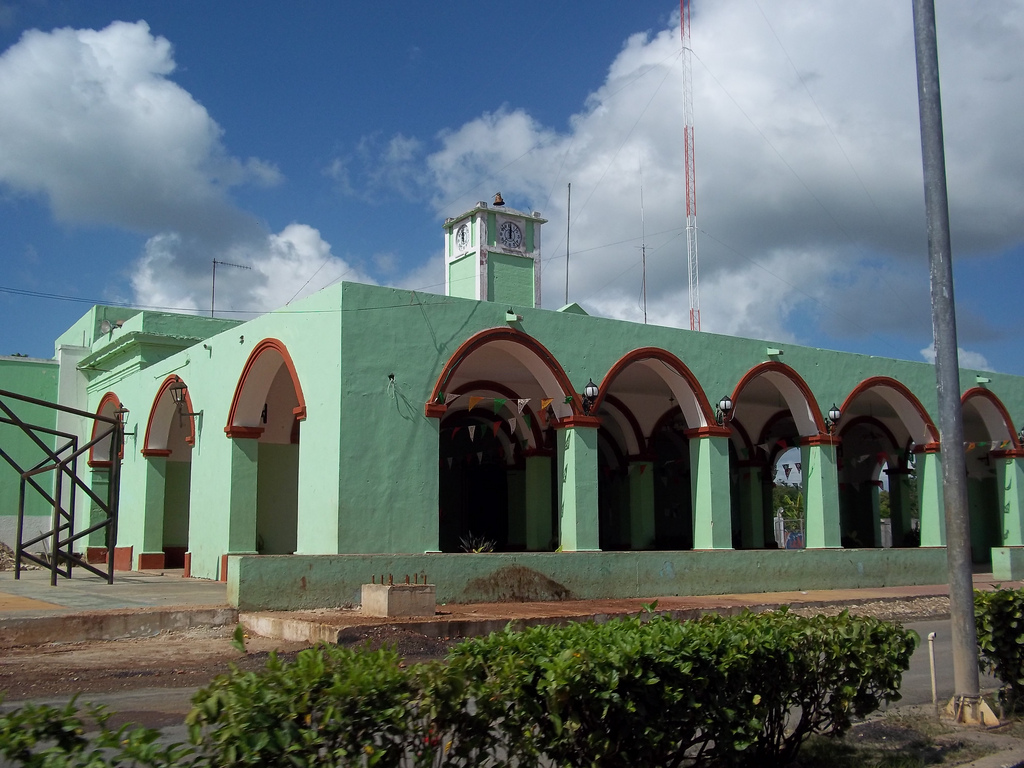
- City hall

- Location within Yucatán (state)
- Coordinates: 21°01′08″N 88°10′37″W
- Country: Mexico
- State: Yucatán
- Municipality: Calotmul
- Elevation: 25 m (82 ft)

Population (2010)
  - Total: 2,764
- Time zone: UTC-6 (Central Standard Time)
- Postal code: 97745
- Area code: 986

Calotmul is a town and the municipal seat of the Calotmul Municipality, Yucatán in Mexico. As of 2010, the town has a population of 2,764.

== Demographics ==
View chart definition.
