= Vehicle registration plates of Mexico =

United Mexican States (Mexico)
- Country: Mexico
- Country code: MEX

Current series
- Size: 12 in × 6 in 300 mm × 150 mm
- Serial format: Not standard.

Vehicle registration plates of Mexico are issued with unique visual designs by each state, but with a single national numbering system, such that serials are not duplicated in multiple states. Most states change designs approximately every three years, with each state having its own plate replacement cycle. Every year, owners of Mexican-registered vehicles pay the tenencia or revalidación de placas (car plates renewal tax). A set of Mexican plates includes one pair of plates, a windshield sticker, and in some states a plate sticker. The international code for Mexico is "MEX".

== Development ==
In 2001 the size of the plate number was reduced in order to accommodate the addition of the state number, legend indicating the position of the plate on the vehicle (delantera (front) or trasera (rear)), and additional graphics.

Mexican plates are issued in several different classifications: Private, Private Fronteriza, Public, Public Frontera, Servicio Público Federal, Inspección Fiscal y Aduanera, Armada de México, and Secretaría de Relaciones Exteriores. The Fronteriza plates were introduced in 1972 and are available in the Mexico–United States border zone. This zone is formed by the states of Baja California and Baja California Sur, as well as parts of Sonora, Chihuahua, Coahuila and Tamaulipas. While the state of Nuevo León shares a 15-kilometre (9.3 mi) border with the U.S., it does not have any cities within the border zone. The Fronteriza plates are to be used on foreign vehicles that are imported into Mexico, so that they can be registered and driven within Mexico without having to go through the corresponding legal import procedures. However, these vehicles can drive around only within the border zone.

Since the year 2004, a new phenomenon has become prevalent. Vehicles brought over into Mexico (mainly from the United States) but not through legal import procedures, are seen driving all around Mexico, even while keeping their original American license plates for many years. There have been several attempts to force owners of such vehicles to regularize their vehicles and register them properly. These vehicles are colloquially referred to as autos chocolates (chocolate cars).

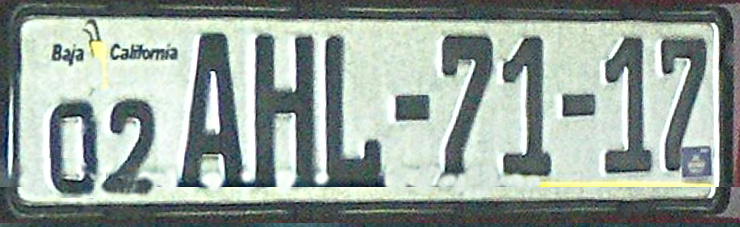
European-style license plates have become popular, as with this example of an unofficial remake of a Baja California plate. Unofficial plates, whilst technically illegal, are tolerated in practice. However, in most states the motorist can choose between Euro-style plates and the more common US-style plates.

As of 24 June 2016, the combinations issued had to be changed as no combinations may be repeated. From having used ABC-12-34, several jurisdictions began changing to ABC-123-A for private vehicles, A-123-ABC for public vehicles. Mexico City changed privately owned vehicles at the same time; they are now A12-ABC.

== Plate types ==
State	Image	Design	Slogan	State abbreviation 1969–1998	Serial format number since 1998	Assigned 1992 for Passengers	Assigned 1992 for Trucks
Aguascalientes				AGS	01	AAA–AFZ	AA–AF
Baja California				BC	02	AGA–CYZ	AG–CD
Baja California Sur				BCS	03	CZA–DEZ	CE–CL
Campeche				CAMP	04	DFA–DKZ	CM–CU
Chiapas				CHIS	07	DLA–DSZ	CV–DC
Chihuahua				CHIH	08	DTA–ETZ	DD–EG
Coahuila				COAH	05	EUA–FPZ	EH–FB
Colima				COL	06	FRA–FWZ	FC–FJ
Mexico City (Distrito Federal until 2016)				DF	09	###-@@@ see Current series for Mexico City	@-###-@@
Durango				DGO	10	FXA–GFZ	FK–FX
Guanajuato				GTO	11	GGA–GYZ	FY–GW
Guerrero				GRO	12	GZA–HFZ	GX–HG
Hidalgo				HGO	13	HGA–HRZ	HH–HT
Jalisco				JAL	14	HSA–LFZ	HU–KK
Estado de México				MEX	15	LGA–PEZ	KL–MS
Michoacán				MICH	16	PFA–PUZ	MT–NT
Morelos				MOR	17	PVA–RDZ	NU–NZ
Nayarit				NAY	18	REA–RJZ	PA–PG
Nuevo León				N.L.	19	RKA–TGZ	PH–RP
Oaxaca				OAX	20	THA–TMZ	RR–RY
Puebla				PUE	21	TNA–UJZ	RZ–SR
Querétaro				QRO	22	UKA–UPZ	SS–SY
Quintana Roo				Q.ROO and QR	23	URA–UVZ	SZ–TB
San Luis Potosí				SLP	24	UWA–VEZ	TC–TP
Sinaloa				SIN	25	VFA–VSZ	TR–UL
Sonora				SON	26	VTA–WKZ	UM–VK
Tabasco				TAB	27	WLA–WWZ	VL–VT
Tamaulipas				TAMPS	28	WXA–XSZ	VU–WX
Tlaxcala				TLAX	29	XTA–XXZ	WY–XE
Veracruz				VER	30	XYA–YVZ	XF–YM
Yucatán				YUC	31	YWA–ZCZ	YN–YU
Zacatecas				ZAC	32	ZDA–ZHZ	YV–ZJ

=== Non-border zone ===
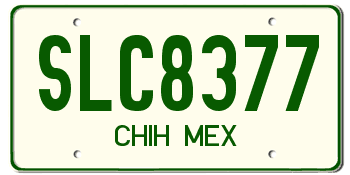
pre-graphic era

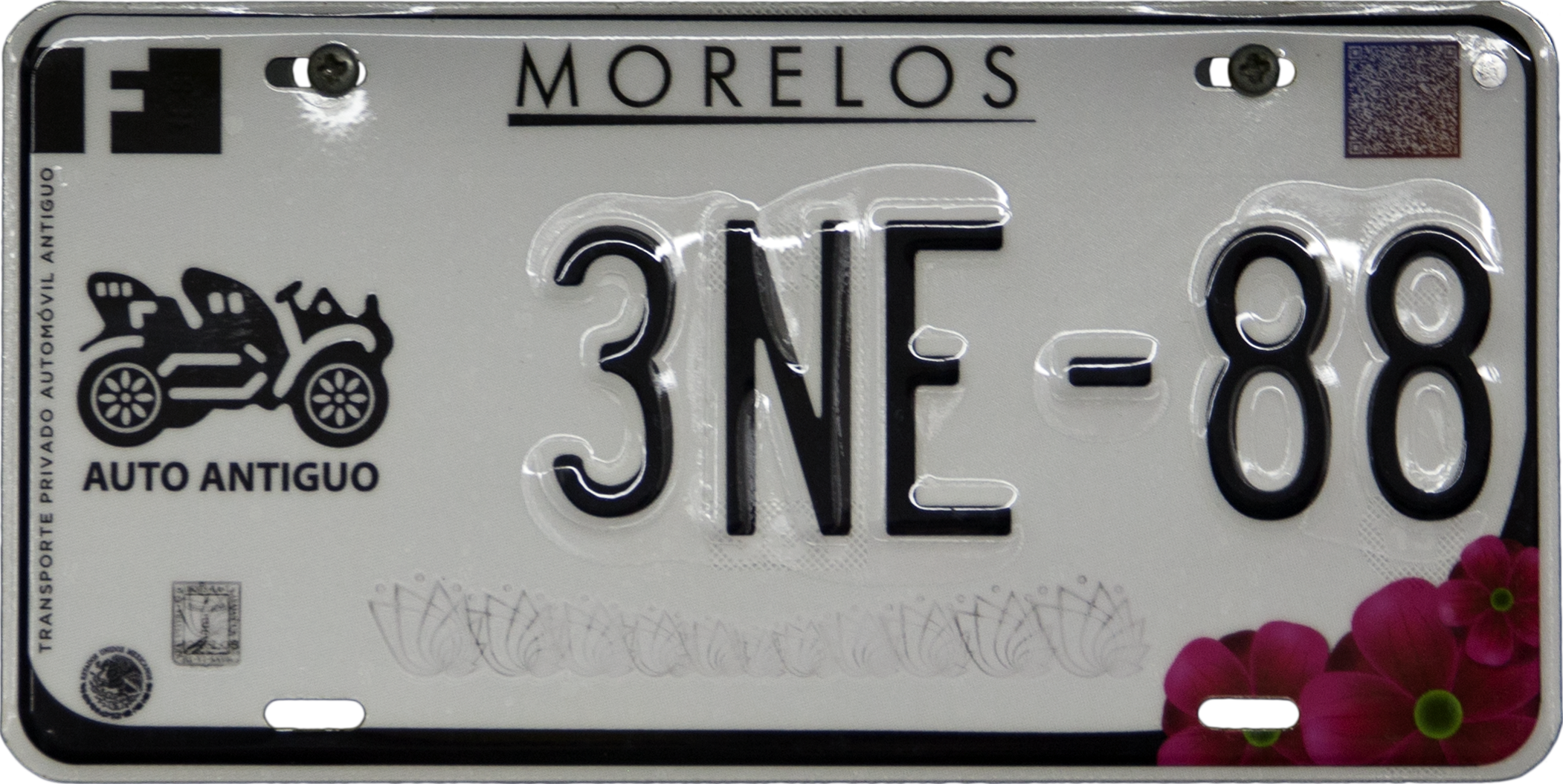
Auto Antiguo license plate from Morelos

Type	Private	Public
Antique automobile	AB-12, 1AB-12 AB-123 in Mexico City	
Bus	12-ABC-34, 1-ABC-23 12-AB-3 in Mexico City	B-12345-A, 123-456-A 000-A-123, 000-12-34, 300-001 to 399-999, and 650-001 to 850-000 in Mexico City (000 = the bus route number) 123-AB-456 in Estado de México–Ciudad de México joint Transporte Metropolitano issues, where the letters denote the municipality
Dealership demo car	1-AB-23C, 1-AB-234	
Handicapped driver	123-AB	
Motorcycle	A123B in Baja California, Baja California Sur, Chiapas, Chihuahua, Coahuila, Colima, Estado de México, Morelos, Nayarit, Nuevo León, Oaxaca, Puebla, Tlaxcala and Zacatecas; A 123 B in Guanajuato ABC12 (following exhaustion of A123B allocation) in Durango, Hidalgo, Jalisco, Michoacán, Quintana Roo and Yucatán; 1234 A in Mexico City	
Passenger	ABC-123-D, ABC-12-34 D12-ABC, 123-ABC in Mexico City	Public Passenger vehicles = Taxis D-123-ABC, 12-34-ABC [A/B]-12345 for free taxis, and M-12345 for site taxis in Mexico City
RV and Trailer	1AB-234-C, 1-AB-2345 A-0A-00, A-00-00 in Mexico City	12345-AB, A-123-456 850-001 to 999-999 in Mexico City Rarely issued
Truck	AB-1234-C, AB-12-345 C-123-AB, 12-34-AB in Mexico City	1-ABC-234, 1-ABC-23D 500-001 to 650-000 in Mexico City

=== Border zone ===
Type	Private	Public
Antique Automobile	AB-12	
Bus	ZAB-12-34	C-123-ZAB, 12-34-ZAB
Handicapped	123-AB	
Passenger	D12-ABC-3, 123-ABC-4 BAB-12-34 in Baja California in approx. 2004 - 2016 (Note that BAB-123-C are not border plates)	C-123-ZAB, 12-34-ZAB
Truck	ZAB-123-C, ZAB-12-34 BA-12-345 in Baja California in approx. 2002 - 2016	C-123-ZAB, 12-34-ZAB

=== Public Federal Service (SPF) ===
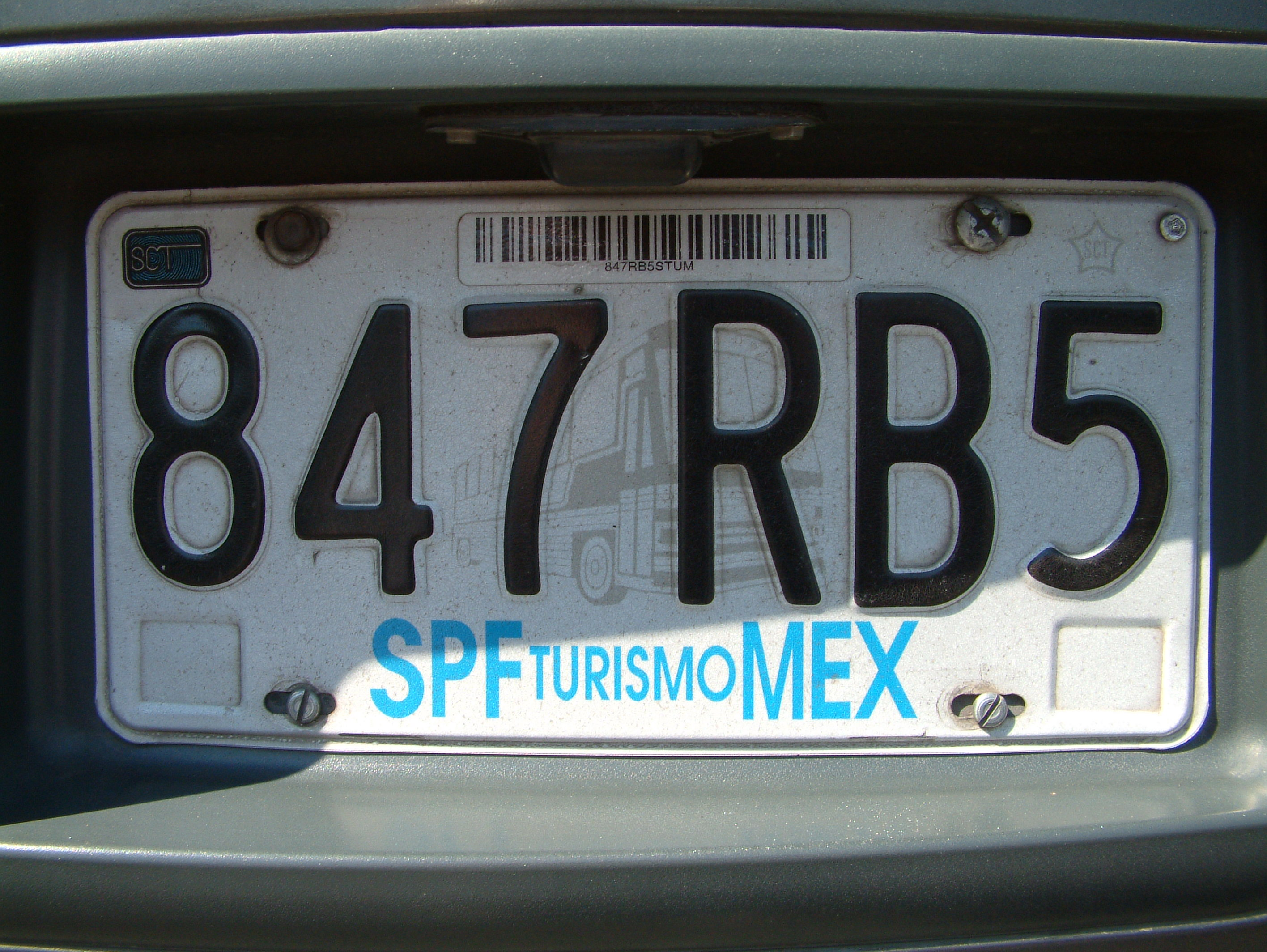
SPF Turismo license plate

Type	Serial format
Freight (purple plate)	12-[A/B/C]B-3C, 123-[A/B/C]B-4
Passengers (orange plate)	12-[H/J]B-3C, 123-[H/J]B-4
Tourism (green plate)	12-RB-3C, 123-RB-4
Border freight (tan plate)	12-E[M-Z]-3C, 123-E[M-Z]-4
Hauling (yellow/orange plate)	1234-XB
Rental (blue plate)	12-[MW-PZ]-3C, 123-MW-4
Handicapped (burgundy plate)	
Diplomatic (blue plate with Aztec symbol)	
I.F.A. (white with dark blue letters)	

=== Seguridad Pública (Local, State or Federal Police and related) ===
Type	Serial format
All vehicles	01-234 (all patrol vehicles, and official-use vehicles from the federal judiciary)

== Current series for Mexico City ==
The current 000-AAA plate series for Mexico City (until 2016 the Distrito Federal) was introduced in 1972, allowing registration for 10,950,300 private automobiles. This series was not affected by plate designs, and continued to be used until its ending in early 2015 (999-ZZZ). However, in 2001 all vehicles using combinations around 000-LWU and older received all-new combinations beginning with 000-MAA. Following the established series, vehicles after 999-ZZZ are registered as A01-AAA, in order not to use a combination used in the past, Letters I, O and Q are not used.

- 000-LAA for late 2000 and 2001 (plate redesign and full registration renewal around 000-LWU)
- 000-MAA, 000-NAA and 000-PAA were issued as replacement for older combinations and a few new registrations in 2003.
- 000-RAA for late 2001 and 2002 new registrations
- 000-SAA for late 2002 and 2004
- 000-TAA for late 2003 and 2006
- 000-UAA for 2006 and 2007
- 000-VAA for 2007 and early 2008 (plate redesign around 155-VSV and 865-VSV)
- 000-WAA for 2008 and 2009
- 000-XAA for 2010 and 2011
- 000-YAA for 2012 and 2013 (plate redesign after 999-YVT)
- 000-ZAA for 2013 and 2014
- A00-AAA for 2015 and 2018
- A00-BAA for 2019 onwards
