= Calotmul Municipality =

Municipality in the Mexican state of Yucatán

Calotmul
- Municipality
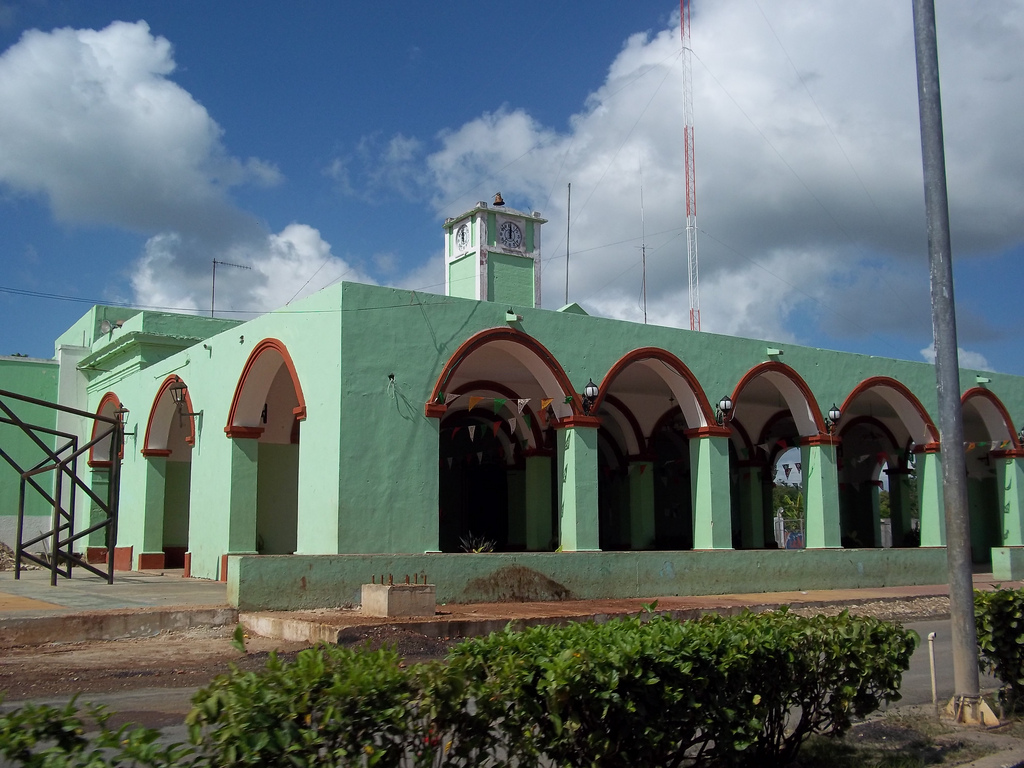
- Municipal Offices of Calotmul, Yucatán

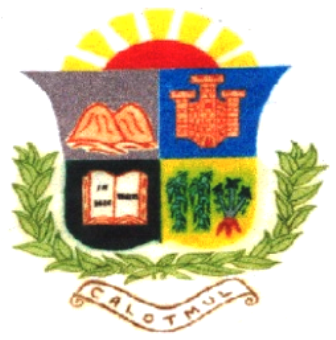
- Coat of arms

- Region 5 Noreste #008

- Location of the Municipality in Mexico
- Coordinates: 21°01′08″N 88°10′37″W
- Country: Mexico
- State: Yucatán
- Mexico Ind.: 1821
- Yucatán Est.: 1824

Government
  - Type: 2012–2015
  - Municipal President: Manuel Jesús Polanco Contreras

Area
  - Total: 361.50 km^{2} (139.58 sq mi)
- Elevation: 23 m (75 ft)

Population (2010)
  - Total: 4,095
  - Density: 11.33/km^{2} (29.34/sq mi)
  - Demonym: Umanense
- Time zone: UTC-6 (Central Standard Time)
- INEGI Code: 008
- Major Airport: Merida (Manuel Crescencio Rejón) International Airport
- IATA Code: MID
- ICAO Code: MMMD

Calotmul Municipality (Yucatec Maya: "place of two conjoined hills") is a municipality in the Mexican state of Yucatán containing 361.50 km^{2} of land and is located roughly 185 kilometres (115 mi) east of the city of Mérida.

== History ==
There is no accurate data on when the town was founded, but during the conquest, it became part of the encomienda system and the first encomendero was Rodrigo Alvarez in 1549. Subsequent encomenderos included Nicolas del Puerto (1665), who was entrusted with 400 indigenous persons; Antonio de la Felguera Castillo (1710), who had charge over 584 natives; and Marco Ayala.

Yucatán declared its independence from the Spanish Crown in 1821, and in 1825 the area was assigned to the Tizimín Municipality. In 1988 it was confirmed as head of its own municipality.

== Governance ==
The municipal president is elected for a three-year term. The town council has four councilpersons, who serve as Secretary and councilors of markets, parks and gardens, and cemeteries.

== Communities ==
The head of the municipality is Calotmul, Yucatán. There are 17 populated areas of the municipality which include Pocobóch, Táhcabo and Yokdzonot Meneses. The significant populations are shown below:

Community	Population
Entire Municipality (2010)	4,095
Calotmul	2623 in 2005
Pocobóch	774 in 2005
Táhcabo	412 in 2005

== Local festivals ==
Every year from 1 to 8 December the town celebrates a festival in honor of the Immaculate Conception.

== Tourist attractions ==
- Church of Immaculate Conception, built in the seventeenth century
- Cenote Actun-Dzonot
- Cenote Azúl
- Cenote Baal-Kax
- Cenote Bal-Che
- Cenote Chacal Has
- Cenote Chakah
