= Cansahcab Municipality =

Municipality in the Mexican state of Yucatán

Cansahcab
- Municipality
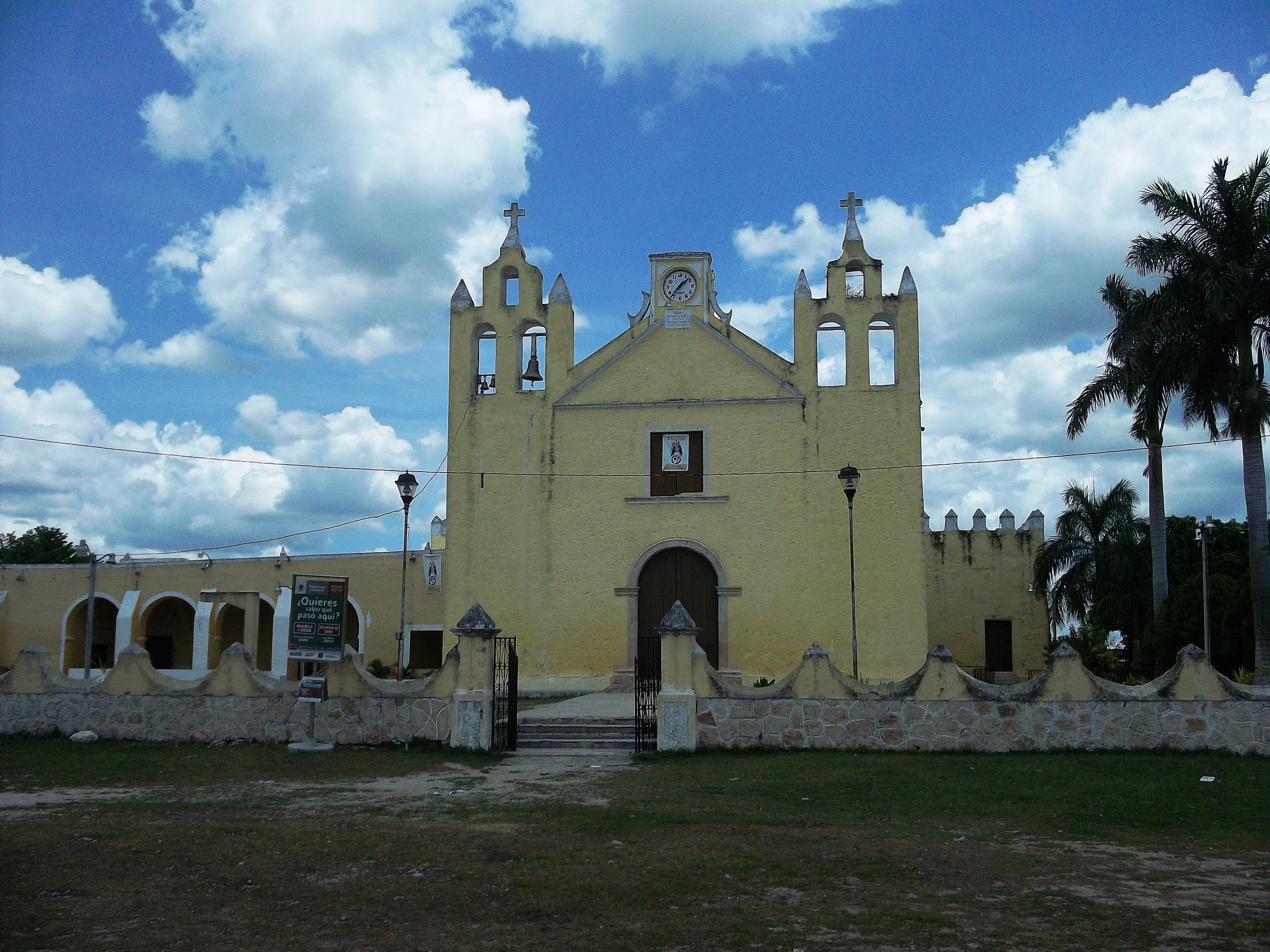
- Principal Church of Cansahcab, Yucatán

- Region 4 Litoral centro #009

- Location of the Municipality in Mexico
- Coordinates: 21°10′N 89°06′W
- Country: Mexico
- State: Yucatán

Government
  - Type: 2012–2015
  - Municipal President: Felipe Chan May

Area
  - Total: 146.9 km^{2} (56.7 sq mi)
- Elevation: 6 m (20 ft)

Population (2010)
  - Total: 4,696
- Time zone: UTC-6 (Central Standard Time)
- INEGI Code: 009
- Major Airport: Merida (Manuel Crescencio Rejón) International Airport
- IATA Code: MID
- ICAO Code: MMMD

Cansahcab Municipality (In the Yucatec Maya Language: "Place of the four white caves") is a small (146.90 km^{2}) municipality in the Mexican state of Yucatán located roughly 50 km southeast of the state capital of Mérida.

== History ==
Before the arrival of the Spanish, the area belonged to the chieftainship of Ah Kin Chel. After the conquest the area became part of the encomienda system. One of the encomenderas was Bantulia Sosa de Rivero, who in 1700 had responsibility entrusted for the care of 250 indigenous inhabitants.

Yucatán declared its independence from the Spanish Crown in 1821 and in 1825, the area was assigned to the Izamal Municipality. In 1913 it was designated as its own municipality.

== Governance ==
The municipal president is elected for a three-year term. The town council has four councilpersons, who serve as Secretary and councilors of ecology, public services and public security.

== Communities ==
The head of the municipality is Cansahcab, Yucatán. The other populated areas of the municipality include Ayala, Ekbalám, Kancabchén, San Antonio Xíat, San Isidro, San Pedro, Santa María, and Uchanchá. The significant populations are shown below:

Community	Population
Entire Municipality (2010)	4,696
Cansahcab	4325 in 2005
San Antonio Xíat	171 in 2005
Santa María	224 in 2005

== Local festivals ==
Every year from 14 – 16 September, Cansahcab holds an annual fair or "fiesta del pueblo" during which an impromptu bullfighting ring is set up to host much of the festivities which include a charrería, bullfighting and folkloric dancing. On 4 October, a feast is held in honor of St. Francis of Assisi, patron saint of the town.

== Notable people ==
Notable locals include General Teodosio Canto who was governor of the state of Yucatán from 1882-1886.

== Tourist attractions ==
- Former Convent and Church of St. Francis of Assisi, built in the seventeenth century
- Cenote Bohchen
- Cenote Hu-Can-Ha
- Cenote Popola
