= Mexican Federal Highway 307 =

Highway in Mexico

Federal Highway 307
- Carretera federal 307

Route information
- Maintained by Secretariat of Infrastructure, Communications and Transportation
- Length: 819 km (509 mi)

Quintana Roo
- Length: 361 km (224 mi)
- North end: Fed. 180 in Cancún
- South end: Fed. 186 in Reforma Agraria, Quintana Roo

Chiapas
- Length: 458 km (285 mi)
- North end: Fed. 199 near Palenque
- South end: Fed. 190 in La Trinitaria

Location
- Country: Mexico

Highway system
- Mexican Federal Highways; List; Autopistas
← Fed. 295	→ Fed. Q20

Federal Highway 307 (Spanish: Carretera Federal 307, Fed. 307) is a free part of the federal highway corridors (Spanish: los corredores carreteros federales) of Mexico. It consists of two discontinuous portions, one of which is in the state of Quintana Roo, inland from the Caribbean coast, running from Cancún in the north to near Chetumal in the south. This section connects several major destinations in the Riviera Maya tourism district, including Tulum and Playa del Carmen. The other section of Highway 307 is in the state of Chiapas, one end at Palenque, then going south east looping around the Reserva de la Biósfera Montes Azules, paralleling the Guatemalan border, then coming back west to La Trinitaria, Chiapas.
