= Tekom Municipality =

Municipality in the Mexican state of Yucatán

Tekom
- Municipality
- Location of Tekom in Mexico
- Coordinates: 20°28′0″N 88°15′0″W
- Country: Mexico
- State: Yucatán
- Mexico Ind.: 1821
- Yucatán Est.: 1824
- Municipality Est.: 1921

Government
  - Type: PRI 2007–2010
  - Municipal President: William Edilberto Can Tec

Area
  - Total: 201.83 km^{2} (77.93 sq mi)

Population (2005)
  - Total: 2,933
  - Density: 14.53/km^{2} (37.64/sq mi)
- Time zone: UTC-6 (Central Standard Time)
- INEGI Code: 081
- Major Airport: Merida (Manuel Crescencio Rejón) International Airport
- IATA Code: MID
- ICAO Code: MMMD

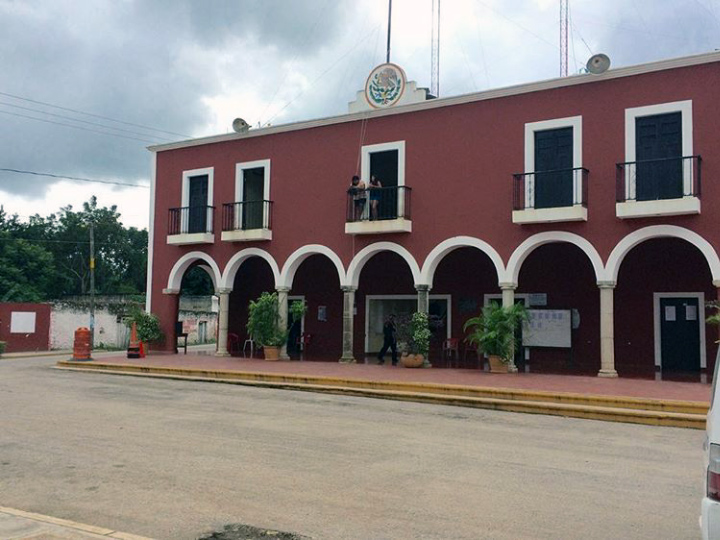
Palacio municipal de Tekom, Yucatán.

Tekom Municipality is a municipality in the Mexican state of Yucatán. Tekom is also the name of the municipality's largest settlement and seat of the municipal government (cabecera municipal). In the XII national census (Censo General de Población y Vivienda) conducted by INEGI in 2000, Tekom municipality recorded a population of 2,660 inhabitants. In the intermediate census count undertaken by INEGI in 2005 (the II Conteo de Población y Vivienda), the total municipal population was recorded as 2,933 inhabitants, 2,413 of whom spoke one of the recognised indigenous languages of Mexico (Yucatec Maya).

The municipality is located in the southeastern portion of the state in the north-central Yucatán Peninsula, and covers a total area of some 201.83 square kilometres (77.93 mi^{2}). The terrain is a virtually flat plain, with a median elevation of 27 metres (89 ft) above mean sea level. As with most of the Yucatán Peninsula there are no surface rivers or creeks, but there are subterranean water-filled sinkholes (cenotes) some of which are naturally exposed at the surface. Average annual rainfall, which is regular in the summer months, amounts to approximately 82 millimetres (3 in). The climate is classed as subhumid.

Tekom was created as a municipio libre of Yucatán state on 1 January 1920. In 1957 the southern half of Tekom's territory was partitioned off to form a new municipality, Chikindzonot.
