= Mexican Federal Highway 180 =

Highway in Mexico

Federal Highway 180
- Carretera federal 180

Route information
- Maintained by Secretariat of Infrastructure, Communications and Transportation
- Length: 2,240.92 km (1,392.44 mi)

Major junctions
- East end: Fed. 307 in Cancún, Quintana Roo
- Fed. 175 in Buenavista, Veracruz
- West end: Fed. 2 in Matamoros, Tamaulipas

Location
- Country: Mexico

Highway system
- Mexican Federal Highways; List; Autopistas
← Fed. 179	→ Fed. 182

Federal Highway 180 is a Mexican Federal Highway that follows Mexico's Gulf and Caribbean Coast from the Mexico–United States border at Brownsville, Texas, into Matamoros, Tamaulipas, to the resort city of Cancún, Quintana Roo, in the Yucatán Peninsula. Although the highway is numbered as a west–east route, it initially follows a north–south alignment through Tamaulipas and Veracruz.

The highway is briefly interrupted from El Encinal to Soto la Marina in Tamaulipas just north of Tampico. The highway goes through Tampico south, interrupted briefly from Cerro Azul to Potrero del Llano, to the city of Poza Rica. It continues south from there through Veracruz and Coatzacoalcos. From there it goes east into Villahermosa, north through Campeche into Mérida, and finally east into Cancún.

Highway 180 connects at the Mexico–U.S. border with U.S. Route 83, one of the longest north–south U.S. Highways in the United States at 3,034 km (1,885 mi). Federal Highway 180 also connects with Interstate 69E/U.S. Route 77 at the border. U.S. Route 83 (along with Interstate 69E/U.S. Route 77) starts the northern terminus of Highway 180 in Brownsville, Texas, at the Veterans International Bridge on the border. After crossing the bridge into the United States, Federal Highway 180 continues as U.S. Route 83 in Brownsville which then runs northward to the U.S. highway's northern terminus, north of Westhope, North Dakota, at the Canada–United States border. From here, the highway continues further as Manitoba Highway 83 until it ends at Swan River, Manitoba. In total, the three highways total 5,691 km (3,536 mi) in length.

== Image gallery ==
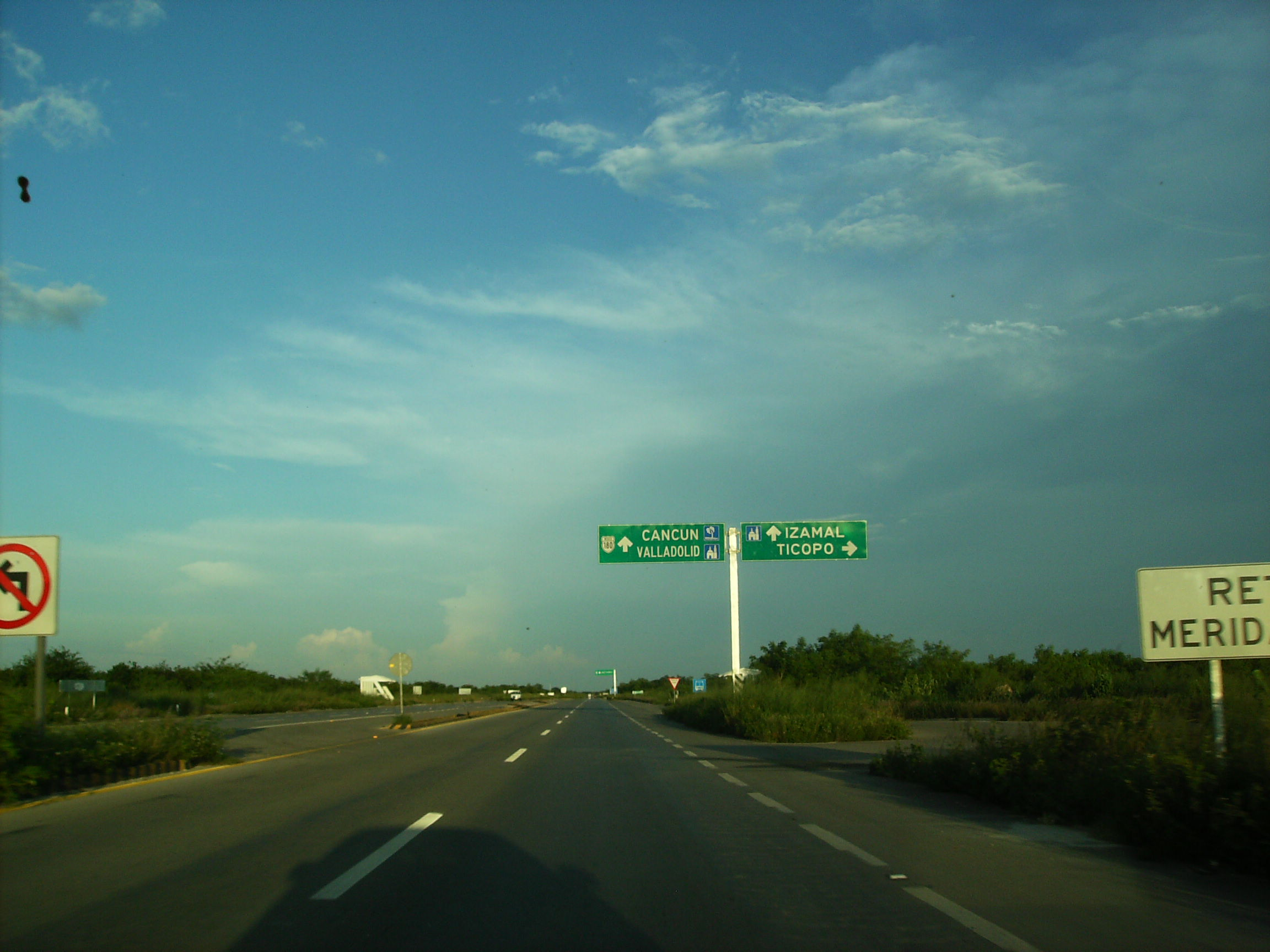
Heading towards Cancun from Mérida

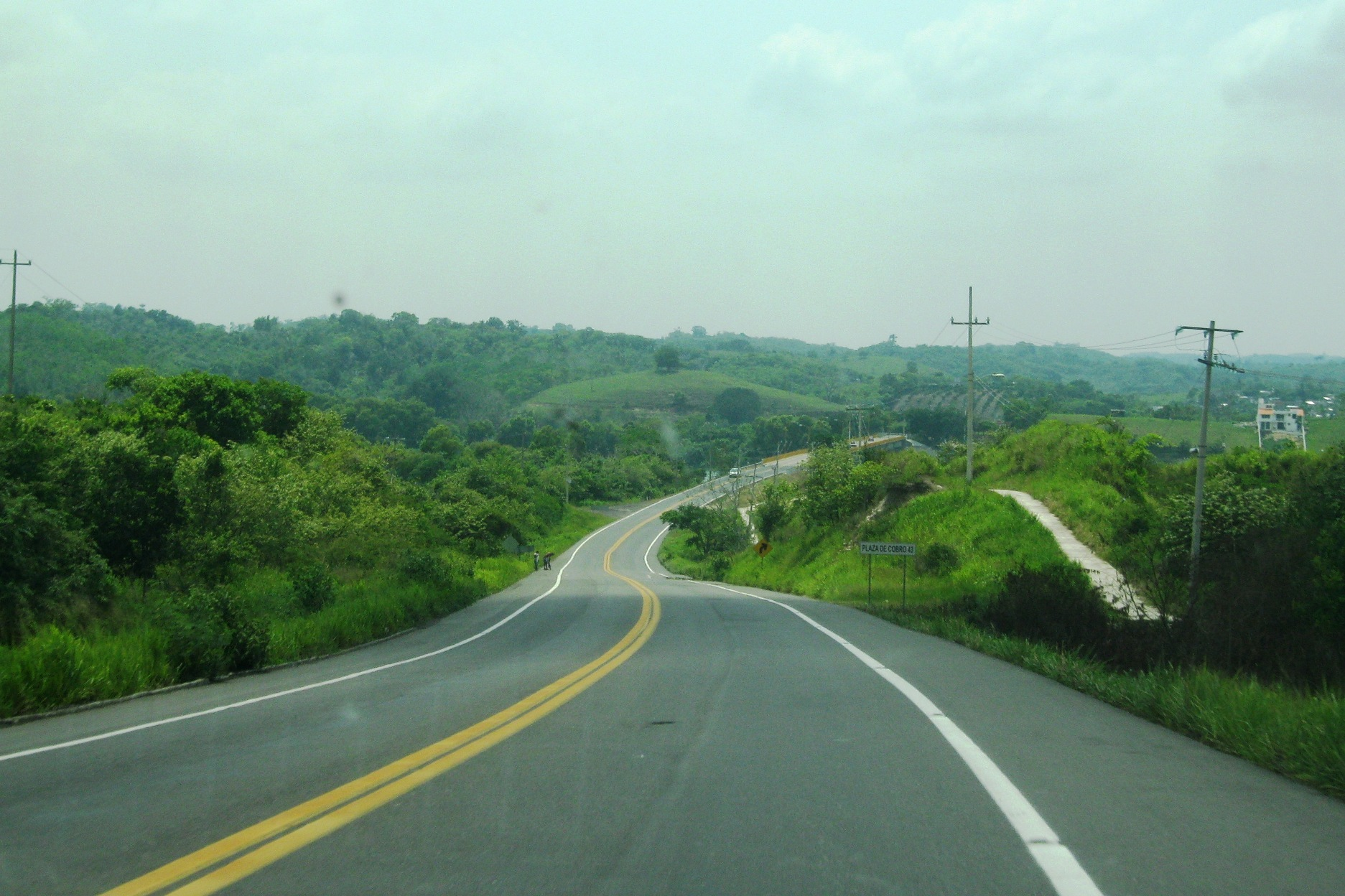
Carretera Federal 180 looking northbound near Gutiérrez Zamora.

== See also ==
- Tampico Bridge
- Zacatal Bridge
